= List of senators of Bouches-du-Rhône =

Location of Bouches–du–Rhône in France

The following is a list of senators from Bouches-du-Rhône, France.

== French Third Republic (1870–1940) ==
- Alphonse–Henri Esquiros (January 1876–May 1876).
- Eugène Pelletan (1876–1884).
- Paul Challemel–Lacour (1876–1896).
- Henry Barne (1879–1893).
- Geoffroy Velten (1885–1912).
- Frédéric Monier (1894–1903).
- Paul Peytral (1894–1919).
- Victor Leydet (1897–1908).
- Jean–Marie Bayol (1903–1905).
- Siméon Flaissières (1906–1930).
- Antide Boyer (1909–1912).
- Camille Pelletan (1912–1915).
- Frédéric Mascle (1912–1917).
- Louis Artaud (1920–1921).
- Louis Pasquet (1920–1931).
- Abraham Schrameck (1920–1945).
- Benoît Bergeon (1921–1939).
- Théophile Pujès (1930–1939).
- Léon Bon (1939–1945).
- Vincent Delpuech (1939–1945).
- Henri Tasso (1939–1945).

== French Fourth Republic (1946–1958) ==
- Charles Coste (1946–1948).
- Anne–Marie Trinquier (1946–1948).
- Roger Carcassonne (1946–1959).
- Léon David (1946–1959).
- Mireille Dumont (1946–1955).
- Joseph Lasalarié (1948–1955).
- Émilien Lieutaud (1948–1955).
- Vincent Delpuech (1955–1959).
- Robert Marignan (1955–1959).
- Irma Rapuzzi (1955–1959).

== French Fifth Republic (1958–ongoing) ==
- Roger Carcassonne (1959-1971).
- Léon David (1959-1978).
- Gaston Defferre (1959-1962).
- Vincent Delpuech (1959-1966).
- Irma Rapuzzi (1959-1989).
- Roger Delagnes (1962-1974).
- Jacques Rastoin (1966-1971).
- Félix Ciccolini (1971-1989).
- Jean Francou (1971-1989).
- Antoine Andrieux (1974-1983).
- Louis Minetti (1978-1998).
- Charles Bonifay (1980-1989)
- Pierre Matraja (1980-1989).
- Bastien Leccia (1983-1989).
- Jean-Pierre Camoin (1989-1998).
- Louis Philibert (1989-1998).
- André Vallet (1989-2008).
- Robert Vigouroux (1989 à 1998).
- Jean-Claude Gaudin (1989-1995; 1998-ongoing).
- Jean-Pierre Lafond (1995-1998).
- Henri d'Attilio (1998-2004).
- Robert Bret (1998-2008).
- Francis Giraud (1998-2008).
- Jean-François Picheral (1998-2008).
- Jean-Noël Guérini (1998-present).
- Jacques Siffre (2004-2008).
- Serge Andreoni (2008-2014).
- Samia Ghali (2008-present).
- Bruno Gilles (2008-present).
- Sophie Joissains (2008-present).
- Isabelle Pasquet (2008-2014).
- Roland Povinelli (2008-2014).
- Michel Amiel (2014-present).
- Mireille Jouve (2014-present).
- Stéphane Ravier (2014-present).

== Sources ==
- Liste des anciens sénateurs de la IIIème République par circonscription (in French), Sénat de France
- Liste des anciens sénateurs de la IVème République par circonscription (in French), Sénat de France
- Liste des anciens sénateurs de la Vème République par circonscription (in French), Sénat de France
- Liste par département – Bouches-du-Rhône (in French), Sénat de France
