= Departmental Council of Bouches-du-Rhône =

Deliberative assembly in France

- Logo of the Council

Leadership
- President: Martine Vassal, LR since 2 April 2015

Meeting place
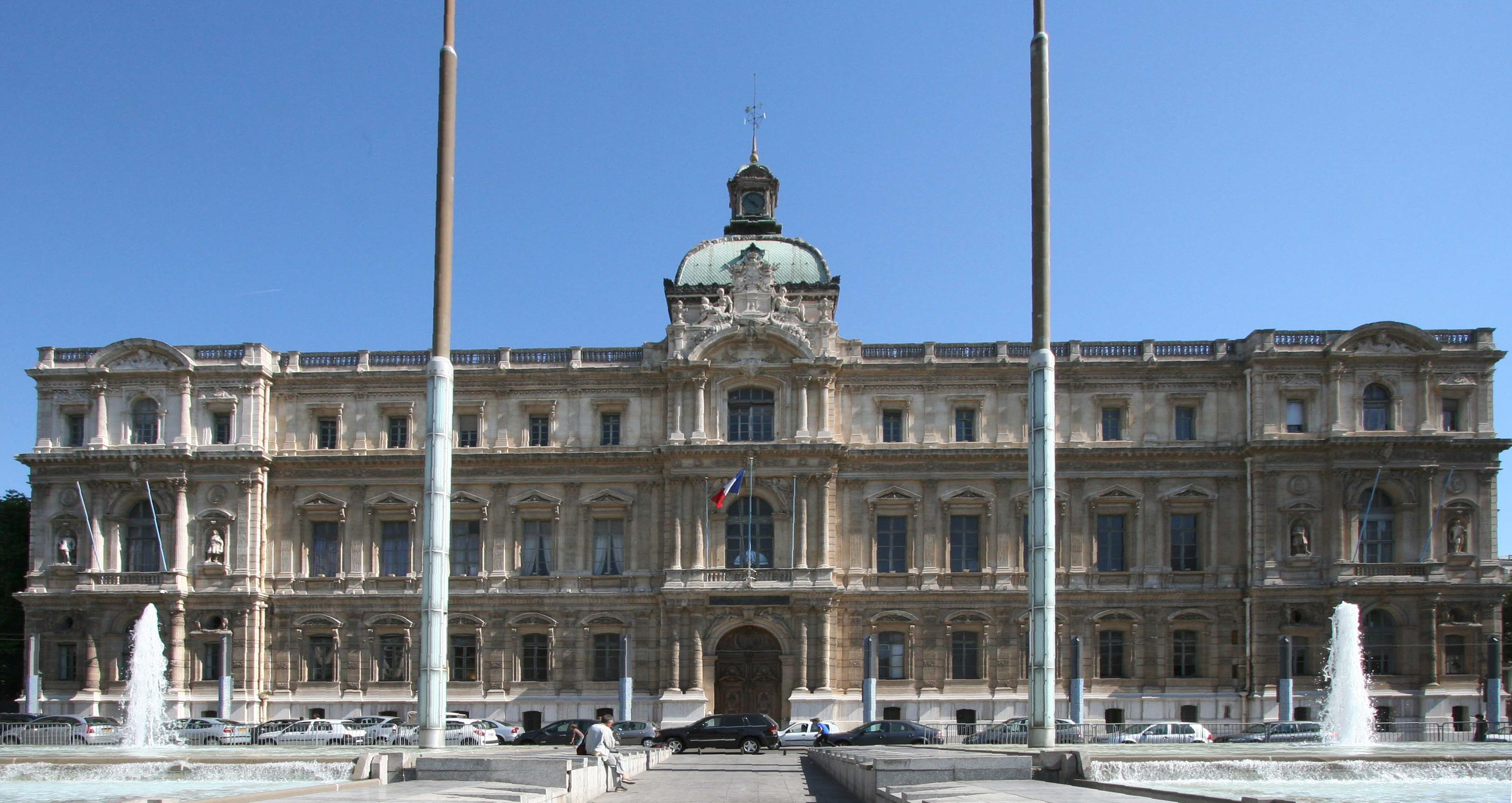
- Hôtel du département des Bouches-du-Rhône, Marseille

Website
- www.departement13.fr

The Departmental Council of Bouches-du-Rhône (French: Conseil départemental des Bouches-du-Rhône; Occitan: Conselh Departamental dei Bocas de Ròse), sometimes abbreviated "CD 13" (in reference to Bouches-du-Rhône's INSEE and postal number), is the deliberative assembly of the French department of Bouches-du-Rhône. It consists of 58 members, known as departmental councilors, from 29 cantons. Its headquarters are in Marseille, the department's prefecture.

Fully renewed on 20 and 27 June 2021, the departmental council has been chaired since 2 April 2015 by Martine Vassal of The Republicans.

== Composition ==
Electoral map of the cantons of Bouches-du-Rhône, after the 2021 departmental elections

Distribution of seats (as of 2021)
Party	Acronym	Seats	Group
Majority (44 seats)
The Republicans	LR	24	Provence united
Miscellaneous right	DVD	3	Provence united
Democratic Movement	MoDem	1	Provence united
Union of Democrats and Independents	UDI	1	Provence united
Agir	Agir	1	Provence united
Ecology Generation	GE	1	Provence united
Radical Party of the Left	PRG	1	Provence united
Miscellaneous left	DVG	4	Miscellaneous left
Miscellaneous centre	DVC	4	Miscellaneous centre
La République En Marche!	LREM	4	La République En Marche
Opposition (14 seats)
Socialist Party	PS	8	Left-wing union, environmentalist and citizen
Republican and Socialist Left	GRS	1	Left-wing union, environmentalist and citizen
Europe Ecology – The Greens	EELV	1	Left-wing union, environmentalist and citizen
French Communist Party	PCF	2	Communist Party
National Rally	RN	2	National Rally

== Executive ==
=== Presidents ===
Period		Identity	Party
1913	1914	Louis Pasquet	GD
1914	1917	Joseph Cabassol	PRRRS
1917	1918	Dominique Duverger	SFIO
1918	1930	Louis Pasquet	GD
1931	1940	Léon Bon	SFIO
1945	1953	Félix Gouin	SFIO
1953	1955	Max Juvenal	SFIO
1955	1957	Vincent Delpuech	PR
1957	1961	Jean Masse	PS
1961	1964	Jean Graille	PS
1964	1967	Victor Savine	PS
1967	1989	Louis Philibert	PS
1989	1998	Lucien Weygand	PS
1998	1998	Francois Bernardini	PS
1998	2014	Jean-Noel Guérini	PS
2014	2015	Jean-Noel Guérini	LFD13
2015	2021	Martine Vassal	LR
2021	Incumbent	Martine Vassal	LR

=== Vice presidents ===
The President of the Departmental Council is assisted by 15 vice presidents chosen from among the departmental councillors. (Note: This number of vice-presidents varies in each council from four to fifteen, but may not exceed 30% of the membership of the board.) Each of them has a delegation of authority.

Order	Name	Party	Canton	Delegation (in charge of)
1st	Danièle Milon	UCD	La Ciotat	Tourism
2nd	Gérard Gazay	UCD	Aubagne	Economic development, employment and professional integration
3rd	Valérie Guarino	UCD	Marignane	People with disabilities and at the Departmental House of Handicapped People
4th	Lucien Limousin	UCD	Châteaurenard	Agriculture and territories outside Metropolitan France
5th	Marie-Pierre Callet	UCD	Salon-de-Provence-1	Roads
6th	Éric Le Dissès	UCD	Marignane	Ports, airports and Étang de Berre
7th	Sabine Bernasconi	UCD	Marseille-12	Elderly people
8th	Lionel Royer-Perreaut	UCD	Marseille-10	International relations and outreach of Marseille
9th	Véronique Miquelly	UCD	Allauch	Human resources and general administration
10th	Didier Réault	UCD	Marseille-9	Agenda 21, solutions based on nature and major risks
11th	Laure-Agnès Caradec	UCD	Marseille-9	Regional planning, structuring facilities and transport financing
12th	Yves Moraine	UCD	Marseille-12	Finance and veterans
13th	Nicole Joulia	DVG	Istres	Culture
14th	Thierry Santelli	UCD	Marseille-8	Sports, Handisport, Health Sport and the Promotion of Women's Sport
15th	Nora Preziosi	UCD	Marseille-5	City Policy and the New Urban Renewal Program

== Councillors' scarf ==
Scarf of the departmental councillors of Bouches-du-Rhône

The departmental councilors of Bouches-du-Rhône wear a tricolor: yellow, white and blue scarf. Unlike the scarf of parliamentarians and elected municipal officials, the wearing of the departmental scarf is not sanctioned by an official text.

== See also ==
- Bouches-du-Rhône
- Departmental council (France)
