= Martine Vassal =

French politician (born 1962)

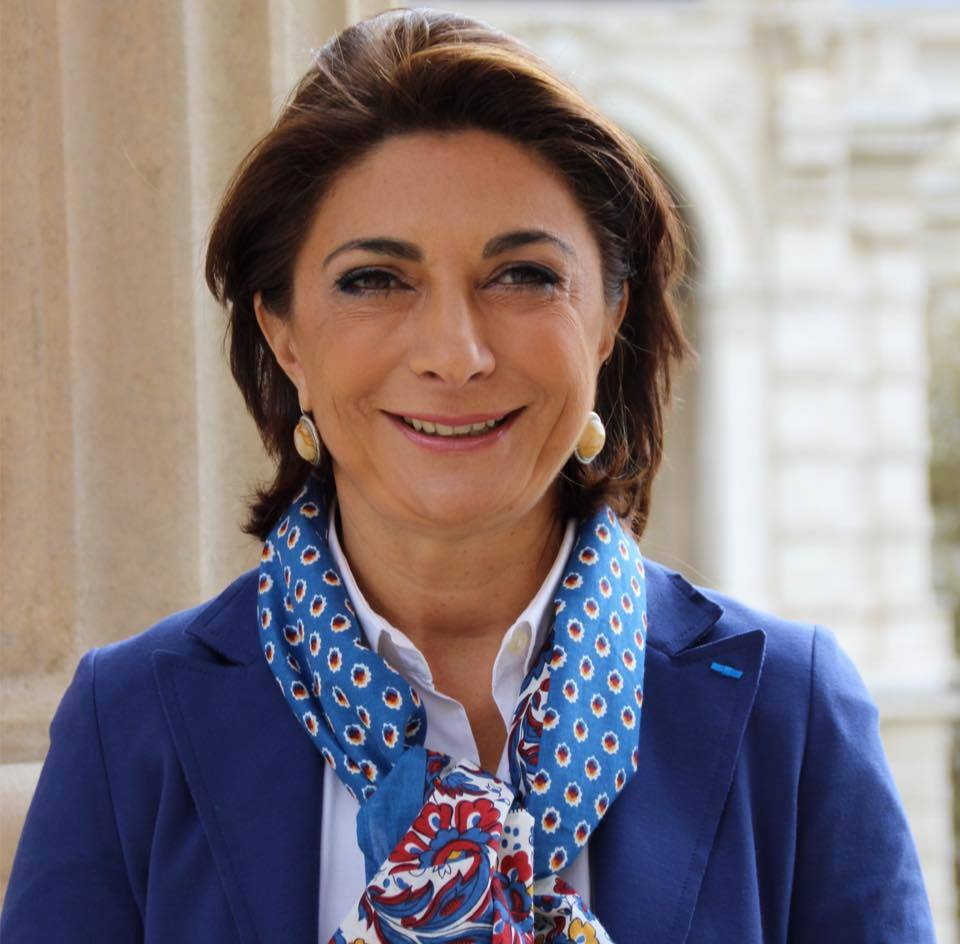

President of the Departmental Council of Bouches-du-Rhône
- Incumbent
- Assumed office 2 April 2015
- Preceded by: Jean-Noël Guérini

Member of the Departmental Council of Bouches-du-Rhône
- Incumbent
- Assumed office 6 October 2002
- Constituency: Canton of Marseille-10

Municipal Councillor of Marseille
- Incumbent
- Assumed office 18 March 2001
- Constituency: 4th sector

President of the Aix-Marseille-Provence Metropolis
- In office 6 September 2018 (Note: Ad interim, 6 – 20 September 2018.) – 7 April 2026
- Preceded by: Jean-Claude Gaudin
- Succeeded by: Nicolas Isnard

First Vice-President of the Aix-Marseille-Provence Metropolis
- In office 17 March 2016 – 20 September 2018
- President: Jean-Claude Gaudin
- Preceded by: Position established
- Succeeded by: Roland Blum

Deputy Mayor of Marseille
- In office 25 March 2001 – 2 May 2015
- Mayor: Jean-Claude Gaudin

Personal details
- Born: 29 March 1962 (age 64) Marseille, France
- Party: The Republicans (2015–present)
- Other political affiliations: Liberal Democracy (2001–2002); Union for a Popular Movement (2002–2015)

Martine Vassal (French pronunciation: [maʁtin vasal]; née Gilles, 29 March 1962) is a French politician who has presided over the Aix-Marseille-Provence Metropolis since 2018. A member of The Republicans (LR), she succeeded Jean-Claude Gaudin in office, who resigned to focus on his term as Mayor of Marseille.

Vassal previously served as Deputy Mayor of Marseille under Gaudin from 2001 to 2015, when she was elected to the presidency of the Departmental Council of Bouches-du-Rhône, a position she still holds. She has represented the canton of Marseille-10 in the departmental council since redistricting in 2015, previously holding the canton of Marseille – Saint-Giniez seat from 2002, when she won the by-election to replace Dominique Tian, who had resigned following his election to the National Assembly.

On 19 February 2026, she triggered a firestorm when she used the pétainist slogan "travail, famille, patrie"

== Biography ==
=== Personal life ===
Martine Vassal is the daughter of Élie Gilles, an industrialist. She studied at the Lycée Montgrand, then was admitted to the École supérieure de commerce in Marseille.

In 1987, after two years of international training, she took over the head of the family textile company. At the same time, it was a part of several associations of executives and management.

=== Political career ===
In 2001, Vassal was elected to the municipal council of Marseille on the list led by incumbent Mayor Jean-Claude Gaudin, of which she became the deputy at city hall. She was delegated to public sites, food and fairground markets and fairs, then, from 2008, to the quality of the city, public space, cleanliness, sites and markets, urban management and advertising. In 2014, she was entrusted with the delegation of international and European relations. She left her position as a deputy in 2015.

She was also a community advisor at the Marseille Provence Métropole urban community, where she was, from 2008 to 2014, president of the "eco-responsible agglomeration" commission, in charge of waste, water and waste recycling issues.

In 2002, she was elected the departmental councillor of Bouches-du-Rhône for the canton of Marseille-10. Re-elected in 2008, she was appointed president of the group "L'avenir du 13" (UMP-UDI), then in the opposition.

Within the UMP, Martine Vassal was appointed deputy departmental secretary of the UMP of Bouches-du-Rhône in 2006 and national secretary of the UMP in 2013.

As the leader of the UMP for the 2015 departmental elections, she was elected in the canton of Marseille-10 while the right obtained an absolute majority in the departmental council. On 2 April 2015, she was elected president of the departmental council. The first woman to be elected to this function, she defeated incumbent Jean-Noël Guérini; it was also the first time in a century that the right-wing had led the department.

She supported Nicolas Sarkozy for the 2016 Republican presidential primary. As a part of her campaign, she was appointed national speaker in charge of integration. In view of the 2017 presidential election, she supported the candidacy of François Fillon until the first round.

In January 2015, following a report from the regional chamber of accounts, the National Financial Prosecutor's Office (PNF) opened an investigation into suspicions of favoritism and illegal taking of interests concerning Martine Vassal and Loïc Fauchon, Chairman of the Société des Eaux de Marseille (SEM, a wholly owned subsidiary of Veolia). Her home and office were being searched in November 2015. Two years later, in 2017, she was summoned by the police to be heard on this case on which she had declared in 2014: "It was the Marseille Provence Métropole services which carried out the analysis and we followed their recommendations". In 2020, no judicial information was open.

In March 2016, Martine Vassal was elected first vice-president of the Aix-Marseille-Provence metropolis, with economic strategy and attractiveness as a delegation. From 6 September 2018, after the resignation of Jean-Claude Gaudin, she assumed the interim presidency of the metropolis. She was elected head of the metropolis on September 20. She led the merger project between the metropolis and the Bouches-du-Rhône department proposed by Édouard Philippe's government, a project postponed since.

Martine Vassal announced her candidacy for the 2020 municipal elections in Marseille on 13 September 2019. On November 27, she received the support of the Republicans, by 27 votes against 11 for Senator Bruno Gilles. In the first round, on 15 March 2020, LR's list came in the second position with 22.3% of the votes, behind Michèle Rubirola. Martine Vassal was defeated by the latter in the second round, on 28 June 2020, its lists obtaining 30.8% of the votes cast. On July 2, she withdrawed her candidacy for the election of the mayor of Marseille in favor of deputy Guy Teissier. Shortly after, she was re-elected as the head of the metropolis of Aix-Marseille-Provence.

== Controversies ==
=== Relation with La Provence ===
In November 2019, Mediapart published an investigation into the financing of the regional daily La Provence by the Departmental Council of Bouches-du-Rhône after Vassal took the office at the head of the community. The newspaper would have received more than 1.2 million euros in 2018 from the departmental council and the metropolis of Aix-Marseille-Provence. Provence replied that "these so-called subsidies are in fact only the purchase of advertising inserts, a common fact for regional daily press titles". Other fundings were also raised such as that of BPI France or of the Française des jeux.

=== Fraud charge proxy ===
Before the second round of municipal elections in 2020, two running mates of Martine Vassal were filmed by a France 2 journalist, proposing illegal proxies in the 4th and 6th arrondissements of the city, avoiding going to the commissariat. (Note: Usually, to have a proxy drawn up, the officials go to the commissariat, in front of a judicial police officer who verifies their identity. But in this case, the candidates proposed by telephone to establish proxies without going to the commissariat, in defiance of the electoral code.) An elected official explained that the signature of the principal is not even requested since "the commissariat punches all the proxies that are brought to them". Martine Vassal noted that "if the facts are true, they are unacceptable and evoke a "cabal of Parisian journalists". Her campaign premises were raided as part of a preliminary investigation. LR sector mayor Yves Moraine did not deny having proposed such powers of attorney, declaring: "We thought that the conditions for verifying identity would be relaxed given the health situation. And that a simple signature would suffice".

== Distinctions ==
In 2012, she was elevated to the rank of Knight of the National Order of Merit.
