= Salin-de-Giraud =

- Seaside resort
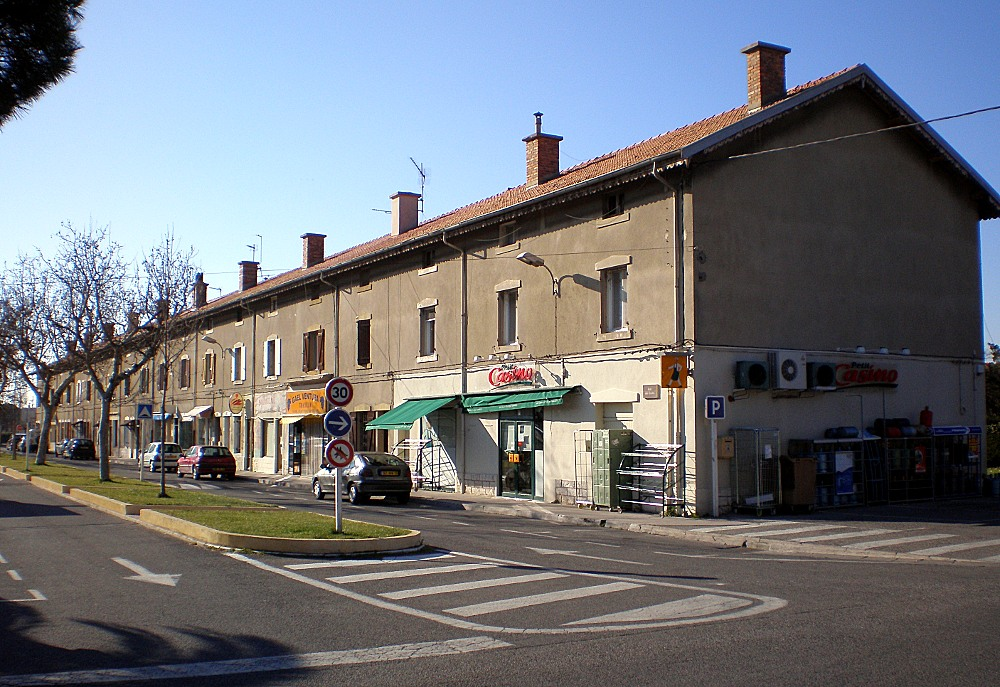
- A street in Salin-de-Giraud, France, 2007

- Location within Provence-Alpes-Côte d'Azur
- Coordinates: 43°24′50.4″N 4°43′48″E
- Country: France
- Region: Provence-Alpes-Côte d'Azur
- Department: Bouches-du-Rhône
- Arrondissement: Arles
- Canton: Arles-Ouest
- Municipality: Arles

Population
  - Total: 2,087
- Time zone: UTC+1 (CET)
- Postal code: 13129

Salin-de-Giraud (French pronunciation: [salɛ̃ də ʒiʁo]; Occitan: Sali de Giraud) is a village located in the commune of Arles in Bouches-du-Rhône (canton Arles-Ouest), approximately 40 kilometers from the city center of Arles.

== History ==
Salin-de-Giraud lies southeast of the Camargue delta, on the right bank of the Rhône. The village was established in 1856. The salt marshes located in the southeastern corner of the Camargue have made Salin-de-Giraud a major center of salt production.

== See also ==
- Camargue
