= René Olmeta =

French politician (1934–2023)

Vice-President of the General Council of Bouches-du-Rhône
- In office 22 July 2002 – 2 April 2015
- President: Jean-Noël Guérini
- Succeeded by: Jean-Pierre Bouvet
- Constituency: 5th sector

Member of the General Council of Bouches-du-Rhône
- In office 31 March 1992 – 2 April 2015
- Preceded by: Georges Grolleau
- Succeeded by: position abolished
- Constituency: Canton of Marseille-La Pomme

Deputy of the French National Assembly for Bouches-du-Rhône's 5th constituency
- In office 21 June 1981 – 1 April 1986
- Preceded by: Georges Lazzarino
- Succeeded by: proportional representation

Member of the Municipal Council of Marseille
- In office 25 March 1977 – 4 April 2014

Personal details
- Born: 10 June 1934 Marseille, France
- Died: 10 March 2023 (aged 88) Marseille, France
- Party: PS

René Olmeta (10 June 1934 – 10 March 2023) was a French politician of the Socialist Party (PS).

== Biography ==
Born in Marseille on 10 June 1934, Olmeta was a part of the Grand Orient de France. He held various mandates at the local, departmental, and national level. Most notably, he served as a deputy of the National Assembly from Bouches-du-Rhône's 5th constituency, serving from 1981 to 1986.

Olmeta died in Marseille on 10 March 2023, at the age of 88.
