= La Force du 13 =

Political party in France

- President: Jean-Noël Guérini
- Founder: Jean-Noël Guérini
- Founded: November 14, 2014
- Split from: Socialist Party
- Headquarters: Marseille, France
- Ideology: Social democracy Liberalism; Pro-Europeanism

Website
- laforcedu13.org

La Force du 13 (transl. The Force of 13, abbreviated as LFD13) is a French political party active in the French department of Bouches-du-Rhône, founded on November 13, 2014 by Jean-Noël Guérini.

== History ==
Indicted in September 2011 for in particular "criminal association" and accused of patronage, Jean-Noël Guérini, senator and former president of the departmental council of Bouches-du-Rhône, was the subject of a procedure of exclusion from the Socialist Party in January 2014 because of his support for Lisette Narducci, candidate of the PRG during the municipal elections of Marseille.

Jean-Noël Guérini, however, chose to leave the Socialist Party before the exclusion procedure was examined and was the head of the list Faire gagner les Bouches-du-Rhône during the senatorial elections of September 2014 which came second with 30% of the votes.

On November 4, 2014, in anticipation of the next departmental elections, 22 socialist general councilors announced that they want to run as part of an alliance " PS - Left Front - Force du 13 - PRG" despite the appeal of the first secretary of the Socialist Party Jean-Christophe Cambadélis not to join forces with the “Force du 13”.

On November 13, 2014, Jean-Noël Guérini transformed "Force du 13" movement into a political party during a meeting.

== Criticism ==
During the launch meeting of the party, Jean-Noël Guérini declared “Force du 13” as “A party of citizens for citizens, neither on the Left, nor on the Right nor in the Center”. He criticized the policies of the Socialist Party at the national level, saying that President of the Republic François Hollande navigated “on sight between denials and aborted reforms”, but also locally by criticizing the policy of the Regional Council chaired by Michel Vauzelle towards municipalities that did not build enough social housing.

The criticism of the future metropolis of Aix-Marseille-Provence was one of the main arguments of the new party, about which Jean-Noël Guérini said to have had “less democracy, less proximity and more taxes”.

Socialist deputy Patrick Mennucci criticized Force du 13, saying "it is in localism, egoism and confusion of minds”.
