= Water privatization in France =

Water privatization in France, in the form of public–private partnerships, goes back to the mid-19th century when cities signed concessions with private water companies for the supply of drinking water. As of 2010, according to the Ministry of Environment 75% of water and 50% of sanitation services in France are provided by the private sector, primarily by two firms, Veolia Water and Suez Environnement. In 1993 the Loi Sapin strengthened competition in the sector by limiting the duration of contracts to 20 years, among others. In 2010 the lease contracts for Paris with Suez Environnement and Veolia Water expired and the water system returned to public management.

== Forms of privatization ==
The typical form of delegated management (Gestion Déléguée) from the public to the private sector is through a lease contract (Affermage) or a concession contract. A lease contract is of shorter duration (10–15 years) and the responsibility to finance most of the infrastructure remains with the municipality. A concession contract is of longer duration (20–30 years) and the Concessionnaire is in charge of mobilizing financial resources. In both cases, the municipality or the Intermunicipal utility fixes the water and sanitation tariff and remains the owner of the infrastructure. Other forms of delegated management include the Régie intéressée and the Gérance, less common forms of private sector participation under which the private sector takes fewer risks.

== Water companies ==
There are three large private French water companies:

- Veolia Environnement (known as Compagnie Générale des Eaux in France) provided drinking water to 24.6 million people and wastewater services to 16.7 million people in 2010, in partnership with more than 8,000 municipalities, including Lyon
- SUEZ (known as Compagnie Lyonnaise des Eaux in France) provided 12 million people with water services in 5,000 municipalities and 9 million with wastewater services in 2,600 municipalities
- SAUR provides water and sanitation services to 5.5 million people in more than 6,700 municipalities and municipal associations, mainly in rural and peri-urban areas.

The private Société des Eaux de Marseille (SEM), half owned by Veolia Environnement and half owned by SUEZ, provides Marseille with water and wastewater services.

== Assessment of private sector participation ==
Private sector participation in water supply and sanitation has a long tradition in France and has provided many benefits to municipalities, such as lower levels of public debt. However, it is not without its critics. A comparative assessment of public and private service provision is complicated by the absence of a mandatory national performance benchmarking system. Therefore, supporters and opponents of private sector participation often find it hard to provide objective figures to back up their respective positions.

=== Comparison of tariff levels ===
According to the Ministry of Environment, in 1992 tariffs by private providers were 22% higher than for public providers. After competition in the sector has been strengthened through the Loi Sapin in 1993, the difference declined to 13% in 1998, according to the Ministry of Environment. No matter how high the difference is, these assessments do not compare apples with apples. For example, public companies do not have to pay for the acquisition of public land. Also, they are not subject to corporate income tax (taxe professionnelle) or property tax (redevance pour occupation du domaine public). Both factors reduce the costs of public companies compared to private companies without providing an economic benefit, since the higher costs of private companies are channeled back to the public treasury. In addition, a study by the research institute INRA showed that the municipalities with the most difficult conditions tend to delegate service provision to the private sector, thus biasing the comparison of tariff levels. Among the conditions driving municipalities to seek private sector participation are the classification in an ecologically sensitive zone implying stricter wastewater treatment standards and a lower population density implying a longer network per customer.

=== Competition ===
A 2003 report by the French Supreme Audit Agency (Cour des Comptes) on water and sanitation in France covering the period 1995-2002 confirms that in 1999, six years after the Loi Sapin strengthened competition, 85% of contracts were still renewed with the incumbent. The Cour des Comptes noted that many municipalities, including some large ones, do not have the capacity to control the private sector contracts, in particular unjustified increases of certain fees. The municipalities do not use the numerous legal instruments at their disposal to better control the lease contracts they sign. According to critics, the three large private water companies are in a stronger negotiation position than the municipalities, thus leading to a lack of meaningful competition and regulatory capture.

=== Transparency ===
The annual financial reports submitted by the private enterprises to the municipalities are often not very transparent. For example, the Cour des Comptes noted that these reports cannot be compared to the financial projections submitted during contract negotiation, because they are established on different bases.

In some cases, private water companies also use accounting tricks to increase their profit margin. The Cour des Comptes noted that revenues from ancillary activities, such as the sale of bulk water to neighboring municipalities or electricity sales from hydropower production, are sometimes omitted from the financial reports to the municipalities. Furthermore, some operators cover fees for a “renewal guarantee” without fully reinvesting the proceeds. These revenues thus constitute a net gain for the operator at the end of the contract. Also, water companies are allowed to carry out works through their own subsidiaries without selecting them according to the local government regulations for competitive bidding. Finally, large utilities can manipulate transfer prices, thus making their finances even more intransparent to municipal regulators.

=== Campaign financing and corruption ===
Private water utilities have been used as a vehicle for financing election campaigns and other political activities, leading to corrupt practices despite several laws passed to prevent corruption in the 1990s, such as the Loi Sapin. Some municipal associations, such as in Grenoble, have sued private operators leading to the cancellation of contracts and to a prison sentence against the mayor of Grenoble in 1996.
