= Olmeta (surname) =

Olmeta is a surname. Notable people with the surname include:

- Pascal Olmeta (born 1961), French footballer
- René Olmeta (1934–2023), French politician
