= Delpuech =

Delpuech is a surname. Notable people with the surname include:

- Michel Delpuech (born 1953), French civil servant
- Vincent Delpuech (1888-1966), French journalist and politician

== See also ==
- Delpech
