= Delpech =

Delpech (French pronunciation: [dɛlpɛʃ]) is a French surname. Notable people with the surname include:

- Anthony Delpech (born 1969), French-South African jockey
- Bertrand Poirot-Delpech (1929–2006), French journalist, essayist and novelist
- François-Séraphin Delpech (1778–1825), French lithographer and printer
- Inés Delpech (born 1994), Argentine field hockey player
- Jacques Mathieu Delpech (1777–1832), French surgeon
- Jeanine Delpech (1905–1992), French journalist, translator, novelist
- Jean-Luc Delpech (born 1979), French cyclist
- Julie Delpech (born 1989), French politician
- Michel Delpech (1946–2016), French musician and actor

== See also ==
- Delpuech
