= Francis Giraud =

French physician

Francis Giraud (1932 – 2010) was a French physician.

== Biography ==
Francis Giraud is the son of Paul Giraud, a professor of medicine, and Marie-Louise Jauffret.

A student at the Sacré-Cœur boarding school, he pursued his studies at the Faculty of Medicine in Marseille.

== Political career ==
Francis Giraud became mayor of Roquefort-la-Bédoule in 1983, and was re-elected four times under the RPR and UMP labels, with the list he led winning in the first round of the 2008 municipal elections.

Elected senator for Bouches-du-Rhône on September 27, 1998, through proportional representation, he was a member of the Parliamentary Office for the Evaluation of Scientific and Technological Choices from 2002 to 2004 and did not run again in 2008.

In 2007, he introduced a bill concerning the teaching staff of general medicine, co-signed among others by Senator Yves Fréville, submitted on November 6, 2007, adopted on December 12, 2007, and promulgated on February 9, 2008.

Vice-president of the Urban Community of Marseille Provence Métropole, to whose creation he had contributed, he resigned from his position as mayor in September 2009, remaining a municipal councillor. Francis Giraud died on October 23, 2010, from pancreatic cancer.

== Distinction ==
- Ordre national de la Légion d'honneur april 12, 2009; Knight on March 23, 1991.
- Ordre des Palmes académiques (1994)
