= Irma Rapuzzi =

French politician (1910–2018)

- Born: 12 April 1910; Cadolive, France
- Died: 3 April 2018 (aged 107); Marseille, France
- Known for: Senator of Bouches-du-Rhône (1955-1989), Finance Committee member (1957-1971, 1974, 1976-1977, 1980-1989), member of the Law Commission (1977-1980).

Irma Rapuzzi (12 April 1910 – 3 April 2018) was a French politician.

== Biography ==
She was born on 12 April 1910 in Cadolive, as the daughter of a miner. She began her career in politics in 1947 when she became a municipal councilor in Marseille. After this she was elected senator of Bouches-du-Rhône and went on to hold many other political positions in her life. She was the godmother of French politician Sylvie Andrieux. She turned 100 in April 2010.

Rapuzzi died in April 2018 in her home, nine days shy of her 108th birthday.

== See also ==
- List of centenarians (politicians and civil servants)
