= Cantons of Marseille =

Cantons in Provence-Alpes-Côte d'Azur, France

Coordinates: 43.30°N 5.37°E

The cantons of Marseille (French: Cantons de Marseille) are administrative divisions of the southeastern French Bouches-du-Rhône department. Since the canton reorganisation that came into effect in March 2015, the city of Marseille is subdivided into 12 cantons, each returning two councillors to the Departmental Council of Bouches-du-Rhône. Their seat is Marseille.

== Cantons ==
Name	Population (2019)	Cantonal Code
Canton of Marseille-1	76,160	1312
Canton of Marseille-2	71,225	1313
Canton of Marseille-3	62,923	1314
Canton of Marseille-4	60,389	1315
Canton of Marseille-5	67,642	1316
Canton of Marseille-6	72,240	1317
Canton of Marseille-7	81,447	1318
Canton of Marseille-8	70,713	1319
Canton of Marseille-9	74,721	1320
Canton of Marseille-10	78,075	1321
Canton of Marseille-11	77,169	1322
Canton of Marseille-12	78,027	1323
