= Arrondissements of the Bouches-du-Rhône department =

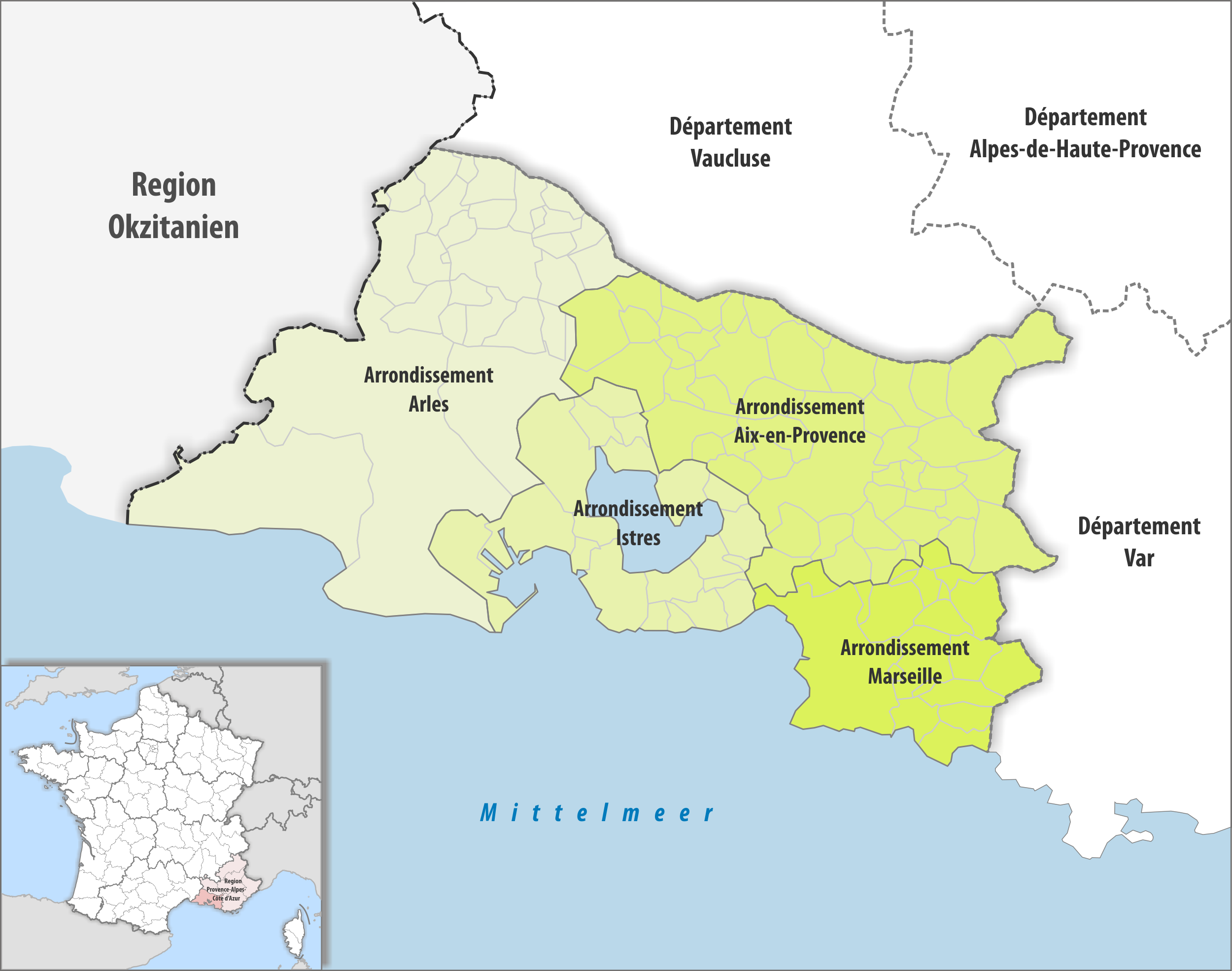
Map of arrondissements of the Bouches-du-Rhône department.

The four arrondissements of the Bouches-du-Rhône department are:

- Arrondissement of Aix-en-Provence, (subprefecture: Aix-en-Provence) with 48 communes. The population of the arrondissement was 460,747 in 2021.
- Arrondissement of Arles, (subprefecture: Arles) with 29 communes. The population of the arrondissement was 171,575 in 2021.
- Arrondissement of Istres, (subprefecture: Istres) with 21 communes. The population of the arrondissement was 334,400 in 2021.
- Arrondissement of Marseille, (prefecture of the Bouches-du-Rhône department: Marseille) with 21 communes. The population of the arrondissement was 1,090,221 in 2021.

== History ==
In 1800 the arrondissements of Marseille, Aix and Tarascon were established. In 1817 Arles replaced Tarascon as subprefecture. The arrondissement of Istres was created in 1981.

The borders of the arrondissements of Bouches-du-Rhône were modified in March 2017:

- two communes from the arrondissement of Aix-en-Provence to the arrondissement of Istres
- one commune from the arrondissement of Aix-en-Provence to the arrondissement of Marseille
- six communes from the arrondissement of Arles to the arrondissement of Aix-en-Provence
- two communes from the arrondissement of Arles to the arrondissement of Istres
- one commune from the arrondissement of Marseille to the arrondissement of Aix-en-Provence
