= Louis Pasquet =

French politician (1867–1931)

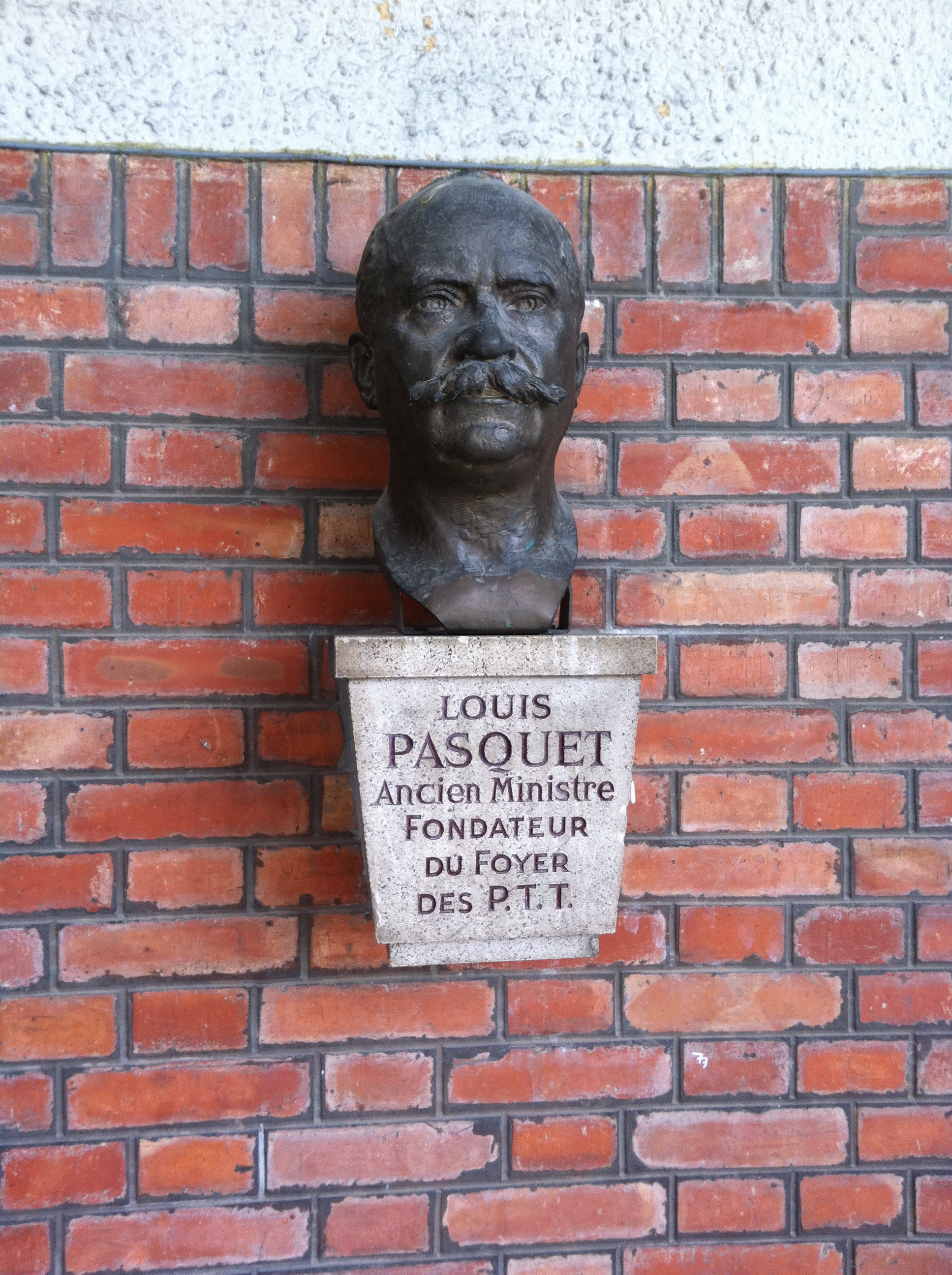
Bust of Louis Pasquet in Cachan.

Louis Pasquet (October 17, 1867 – April 29, 1931) was a French politician.

Louis Pasquet was born in Tarascon.

He was elected three times senator for the Bouches-du-Rhône department: on January 11, 1920, January 9, 1921, and January 14, 1930.

He was Minister of Labour and Social Security provisions (French: ministre du Travail, de l’Hygiène, de l’Assistance et de la Prévoyance sociales) from 19 July 1926 to 23 July 1926, as part of Édouard Herriot's Second Ministry (19–23 July 1926).

He died in Paris on April 29, 1931.
