= Société des Eaux de Marseille =

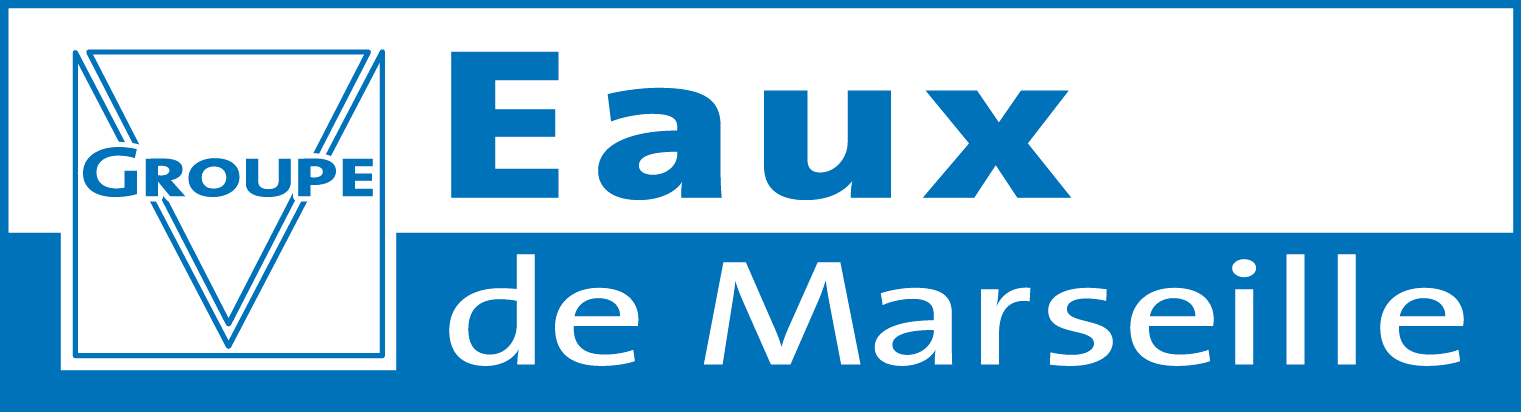
- Company type: Subsidiary
- Industry: Water supply, water treatment
- Founded: 1941
- Headquarters: 25 rue Edouard Delanglade; Marseille, France
- Key people: Loic Fauchon (Chairman), Sandrine Motte (Executive Director)
- Owner: Veolia Environnement
- Website: eauxdemarseille.fr

Société des Eaux de Marseille (SEM) is a French water distribution company in Marseille and sixty districts throughout Provence. It is a subsidiary of Veolia.

== History ==
On October 28, 1938, a department store on the Canebière caught fire. When firefighters did not have access to sufficient amounts of water to stop the fire and two hundred casualties died, and the mayor, Henri Tasso, was dismissed and plans to buy new water pipes were made. The Société d'Etudes des Eaux de Marseille was then established.

Three years later, in 1941, the Société des Eaux de Marseille was established, and the City of Marseille signed a contract giving it water rights two years later, on March 1, 1943. In 1960, the contract was extended, making it more encompassing. It later became a subsidiary of Veolia. It has served Marseille and 60 districts in Provence for sixty years. It is a member of the World Water Council.

== Operations ==
Société des Eaux de Marseille has 9 sites across France.

The company offers its services to local authorities, businesses, and private individuals, both in France and abroad—notably in Morocco through its subsidiary Eaux de Marseille Maroc, which was acquired by the Lebanese group Butec in 2023.

== Governance ==
It is headquartered at 25 rue Edouard Delanglade in Marseille. Its president is Loic Fauchon.
