= Vincent Delpuech =

French journalist and politician

- Born: 5 April 1888; Port-de-Bouc, France
- Died: 9 March 1966 (aged 77); Marseille, France
- Occupations: Journalist, politician

Vincent Delpuech (5 April 1888 – 9 March 1966) was a French journalist and politician.

== Early life ==
Vincent Delpuech was born on 5 April 1888 in Port-de-Bouc, a village in Provence, Southern France. He was educated in Marseille.

During World War I, he served in the Troupes coloniales.

== Career ==
Delpuech started his career as a parliamentary assistant for Frédéric Chevillon. After the latter was killed in the war, Delpuech worked as a parliamentary assistant to Benoît Bergeon.

He served as a member of the French Senate from 1938 to 1945. He was re-elected in 1955, up until 1966.

== Death ==
He died on 9 March 1966 in Marseille.

== Legacy ==
The Boulevard Vincent Delpuech in Marseille was named after him.
