= Jean-Noël Guérini =

French politician (born 1951)

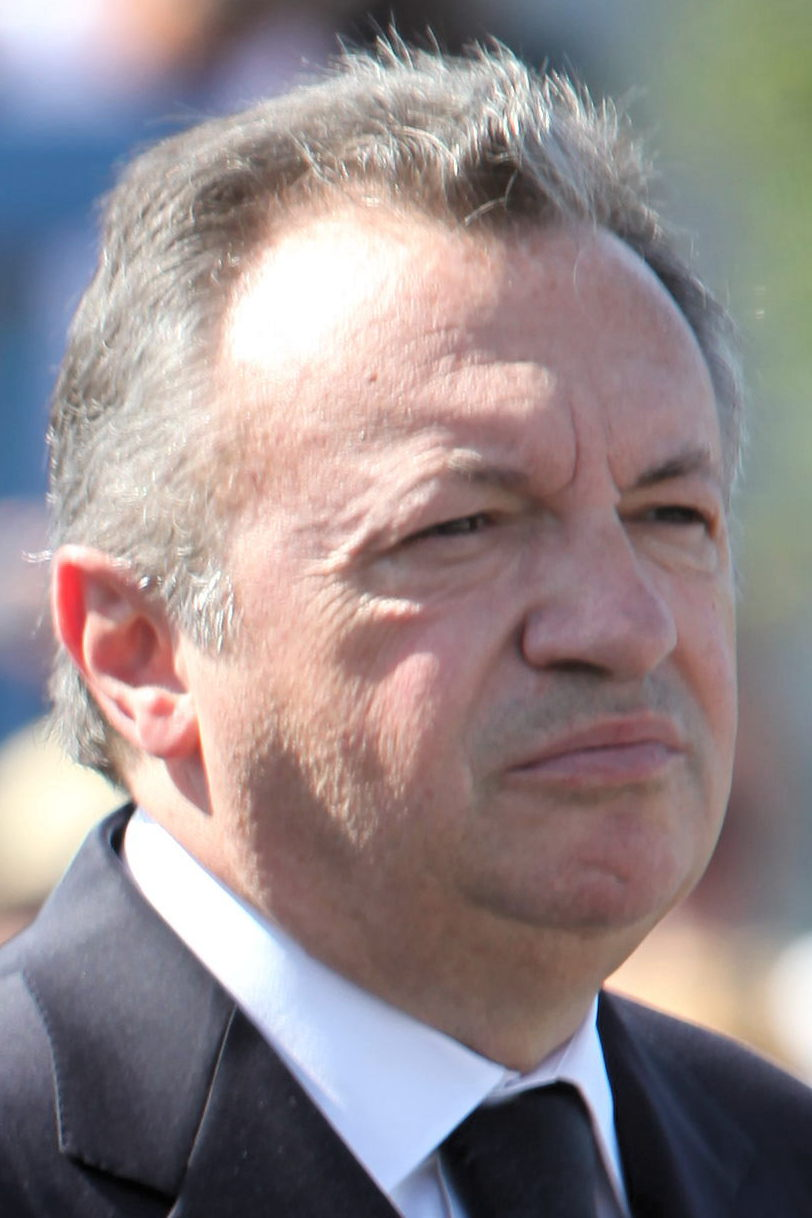
- Jean-Noël Guérini in 2012

Member of the French Senate for Bouches-du-Rhône
- Incumbent
- Assumed office 27 September 1998

President of the Departmental council of Bouches-du-Rhône
- In office 1998–2015
- Preceded by: Lucien Weygand
- Succeeded by: Martine Vassal

Personal details
- Born: 1 January 1951 (age 75) Calenzana, Corsica
- Party: Socialist Party

Jean-Noël Guérini (born 1 January 1951 in Calenzana, Corsica) is a French politician who has been serving as a member of the Senate of France since 1998, representing the Bouches-du-Rhône department. He was the president of the General council (conseil général) of Bouches-du-Rhône from 1998 to 2015 and member of the municipal council of Marseille since 1977. He was a member of the Socialist Party.

In the Socialist Party's 2011 primaries, Guérini endorsed Martine Aubry as the party's candidate for the 2012 presidential election.
