= Bouches-du-Rhône =

Department in Provence-Alpes-Côte d'Azur, France

Bouches-du-Rhône Bocas de Ròse (Occitan)
- Department of France
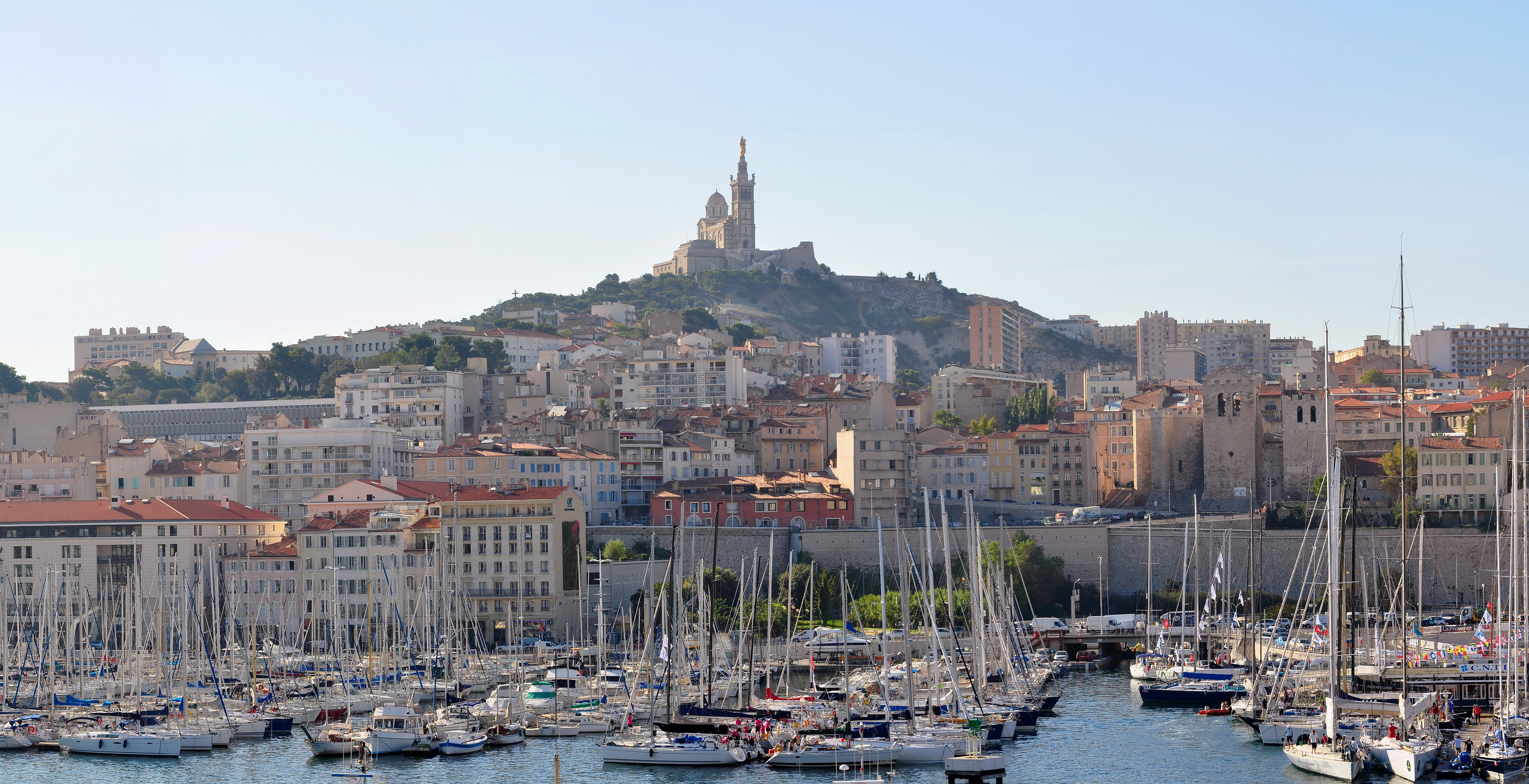
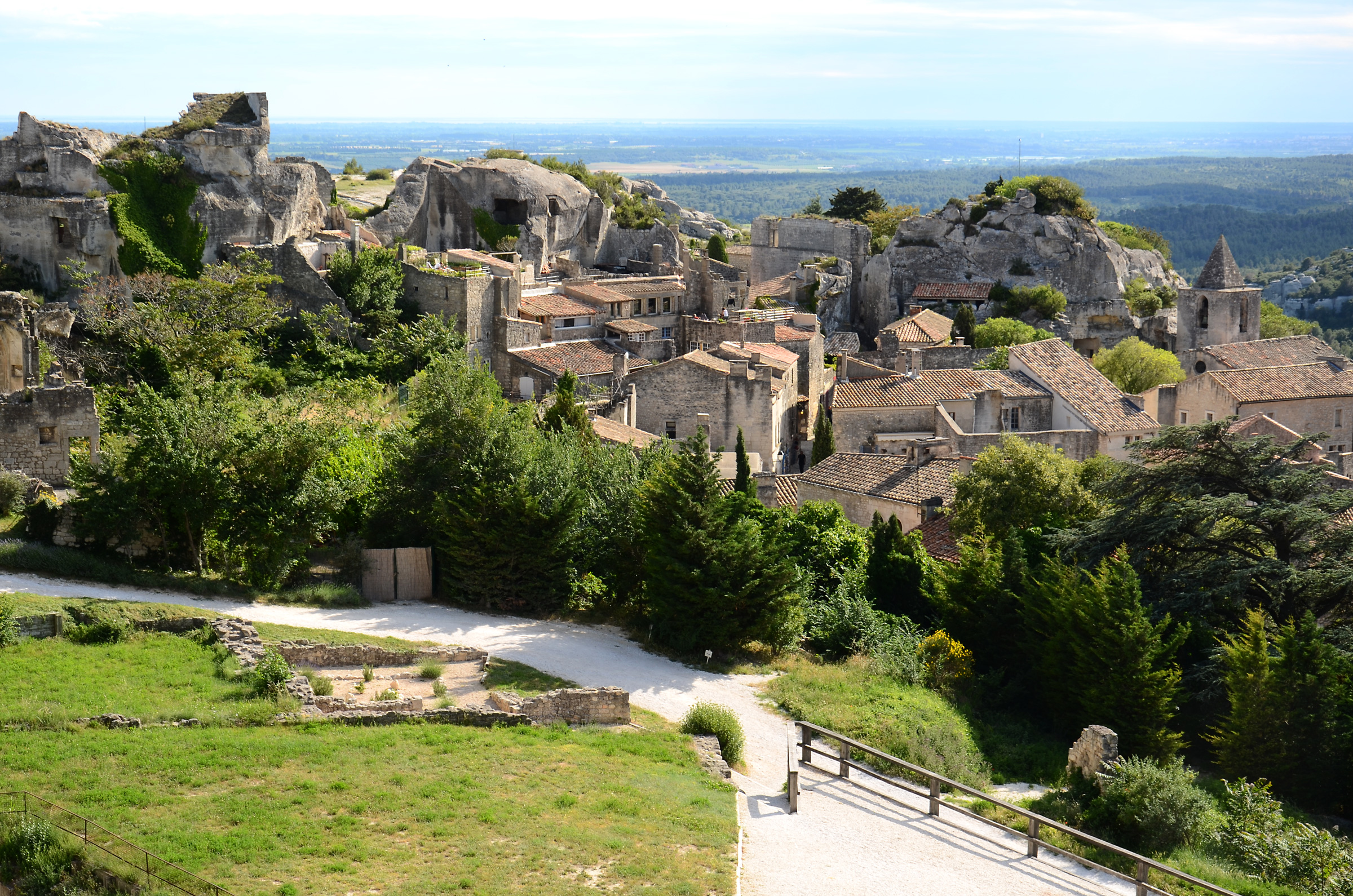
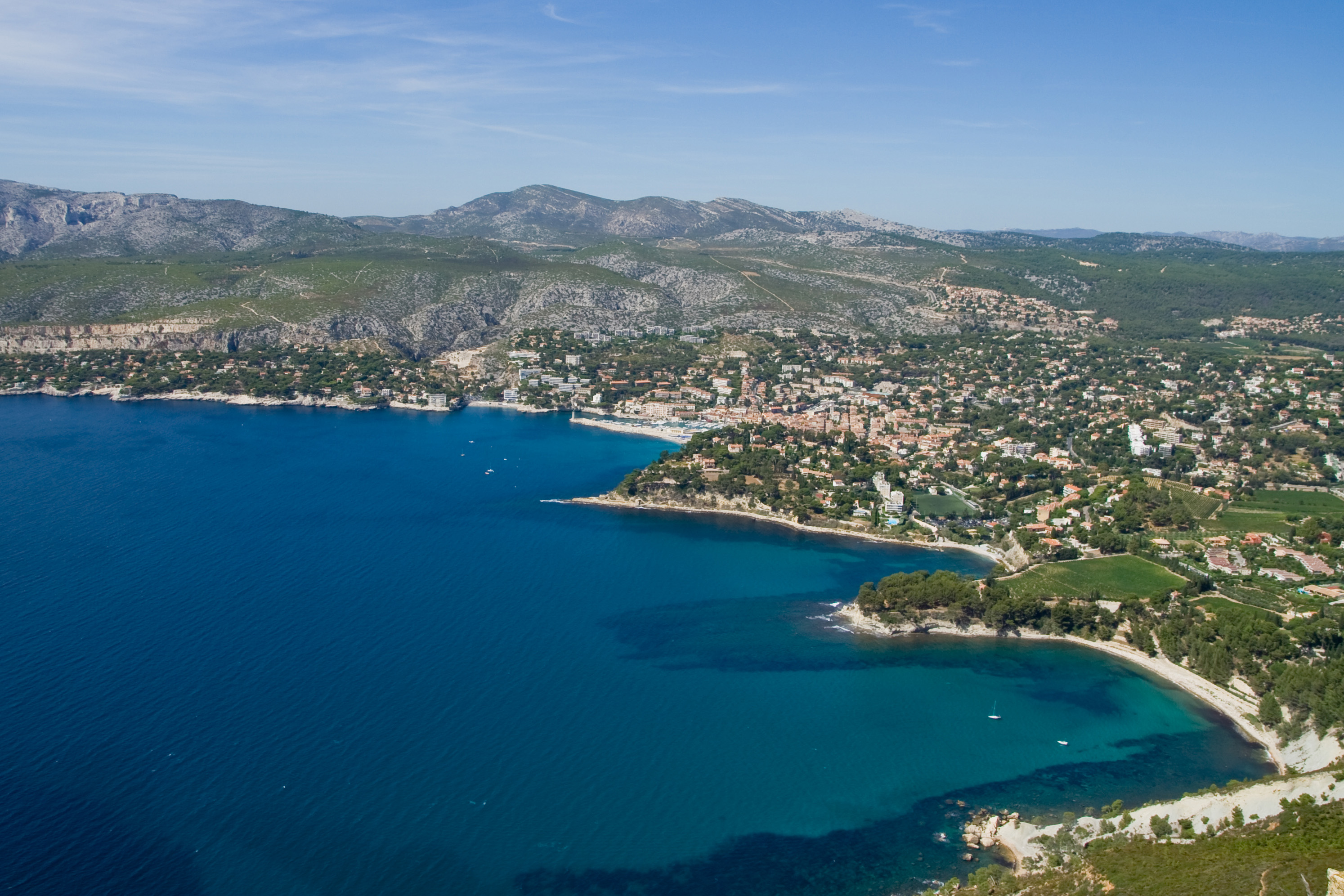
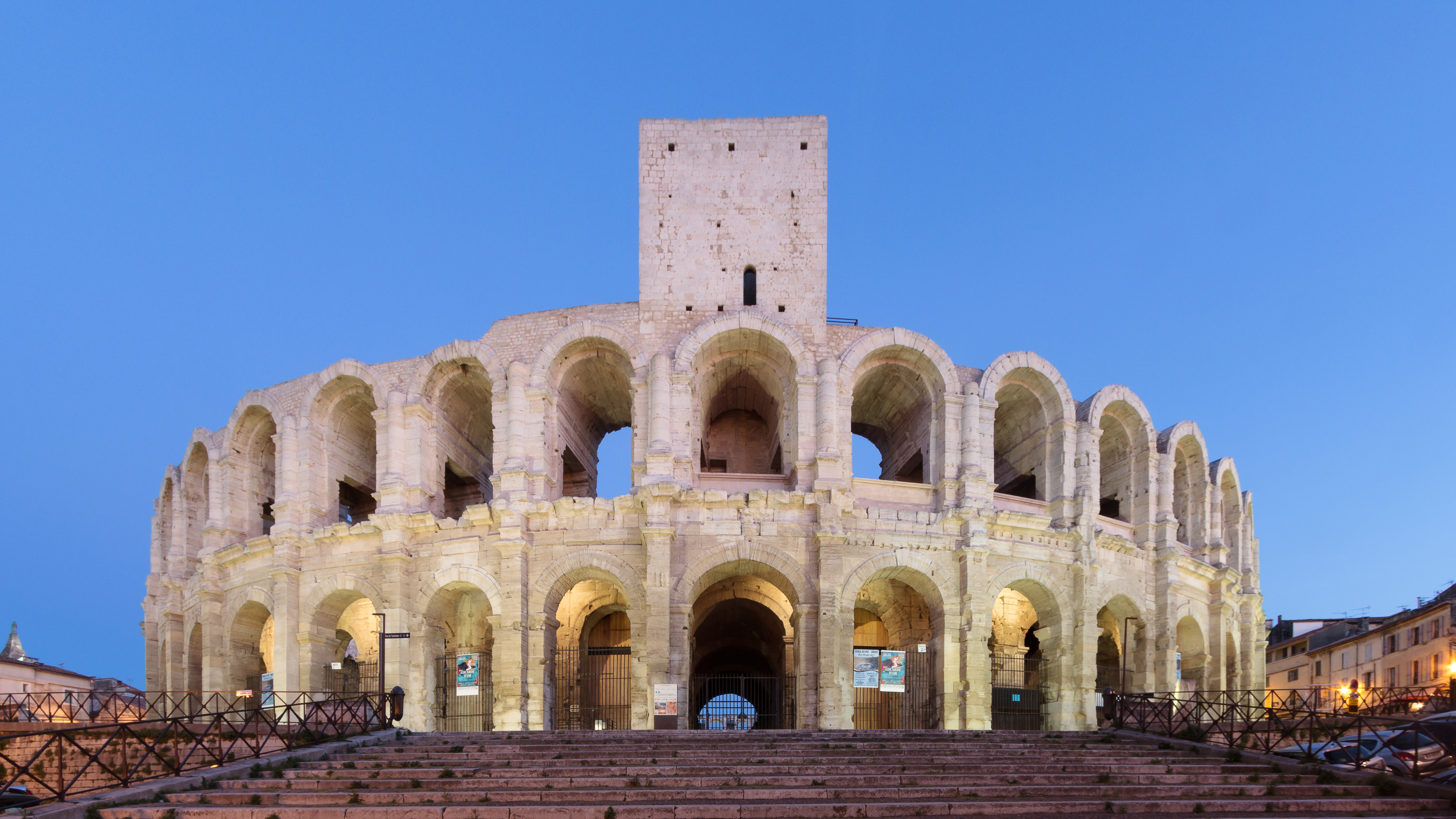
- From top down, left to right: Marseille, the department's prefecture, Les Baux-de-Provence, Cassis on the Mediterranean coast and the Arles Amphitheatre

- Flag Coat of arms

- Location of Bouches-du-Rhône in France
- Coordinates: 43°30′N 5°5′E
- Country: France
- Region: Provence-Alpes-Côte d'Azur
- Prefecture: Marseille
- Subprefectures: Aix-en-Provence; Arles; Istres

Government
  - President of the Departmental Council: Martine Vassal (LR)

Area^{1}
  - Total: 5,087 km^{2} (1,964 sq mi)

Population (2023)
  - Total: 2,087,658
  - Rank: 3rd
  - Density: 410.4/km^{2} (1,063/sq mi)
- Time zone: UTC+1 (CET)
  - Summer (DST): UTC+2 (CEST)
- ISO 3166 code: FR-13
- Vehicle registration: 13
- Department number: 13
- Arrondissements: 4
- Cantons: 29
- Communes: 119
- ^1 French Land Register data, which exclude estuaries, and lakes, ponds, and glaciers larger than 1 km^{2}.

Bouches-du-Rhône (/ˌbuːʃ djuː ˈroʊn/ BOOSH dew ROHN; French: les Bouches-du-Rhône [le buʃ dy ʁon], locally [le ˈbuʃə dy ˈʁɔnə]; Occitan: lei Bocas de Ròse [lej ˈbukɔz de ˈʀɔze]; "the Mouths of the Rhône") is a department in southern France. It borders Vaucluse to the north, Gard to the west and Var to the east. The Mediterranean Sea lies to the south. Its prefecture and largest city is Marseille; other important cities include Aix-en-Provence, Arles, Martigues and Aubagne.

Marseille, France's second-largest city, has one of the largest container ports in the country. It prides itself on being France's oldest city, founded by Greek settlers from Phocaea around 600 BC. Bouches-du-Rhône is the most populous department of the Provence-Alpes-Côte d'Azur region and the third most populous of France, with 2,087,658 inhabitants as of 2023. It has an area of 5,087 km^{2} (1,964 sq mi). Its INSEE and postal code is 13.

== History ==
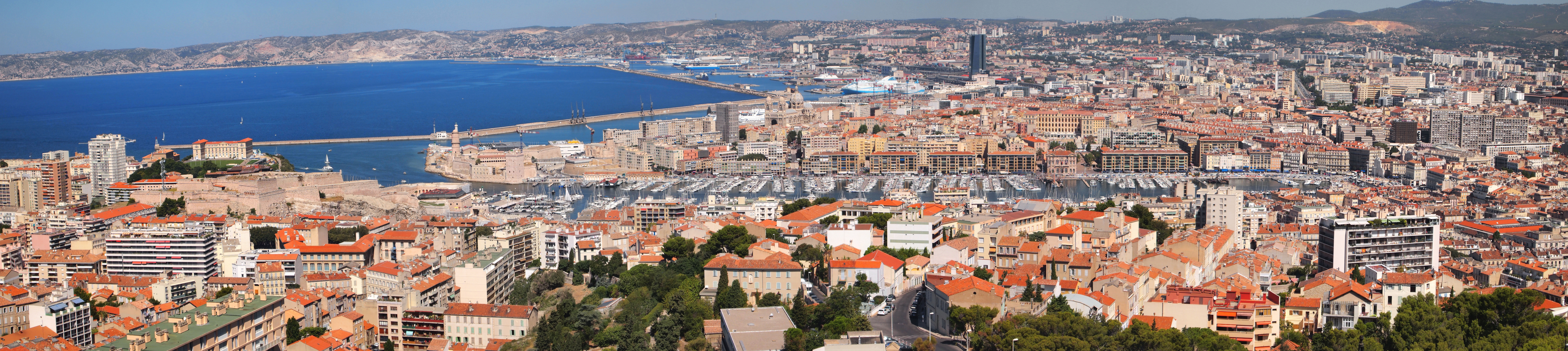
A view of Marseille, prefecture of Bouches-du-Rhône

The history of the area is closely linked to that of Provence. Marseille has been an important harbour since before Julius Caesar's conquest of Gaul. The Roman presence left numerous monuments across the department. Notable people born in the area include Romantic painter Camille Roqueplan and his brother, journalist and theatre director Nestor Roqueplan.

Bouches-du-Rhône is one of the original 83 departments created during the French Revolution on 4 March 1790. It was created from the western part of the former province of Provence and the principalities of Orange, Martigues and Lambesc. It lost part of its territory in 1793, including Orange and Apt, when the department of Vaucluse was created.

Following its creation, the department strongly supported the French Revolution, containing 90 Jacobin Clubs by 1794. It was also noteworthy that more than half of the priests in the department accepted the Civil Constitution of the Clergy, which in effect subordinated the church to the government.

== Geography ==
=== Natural regions ===
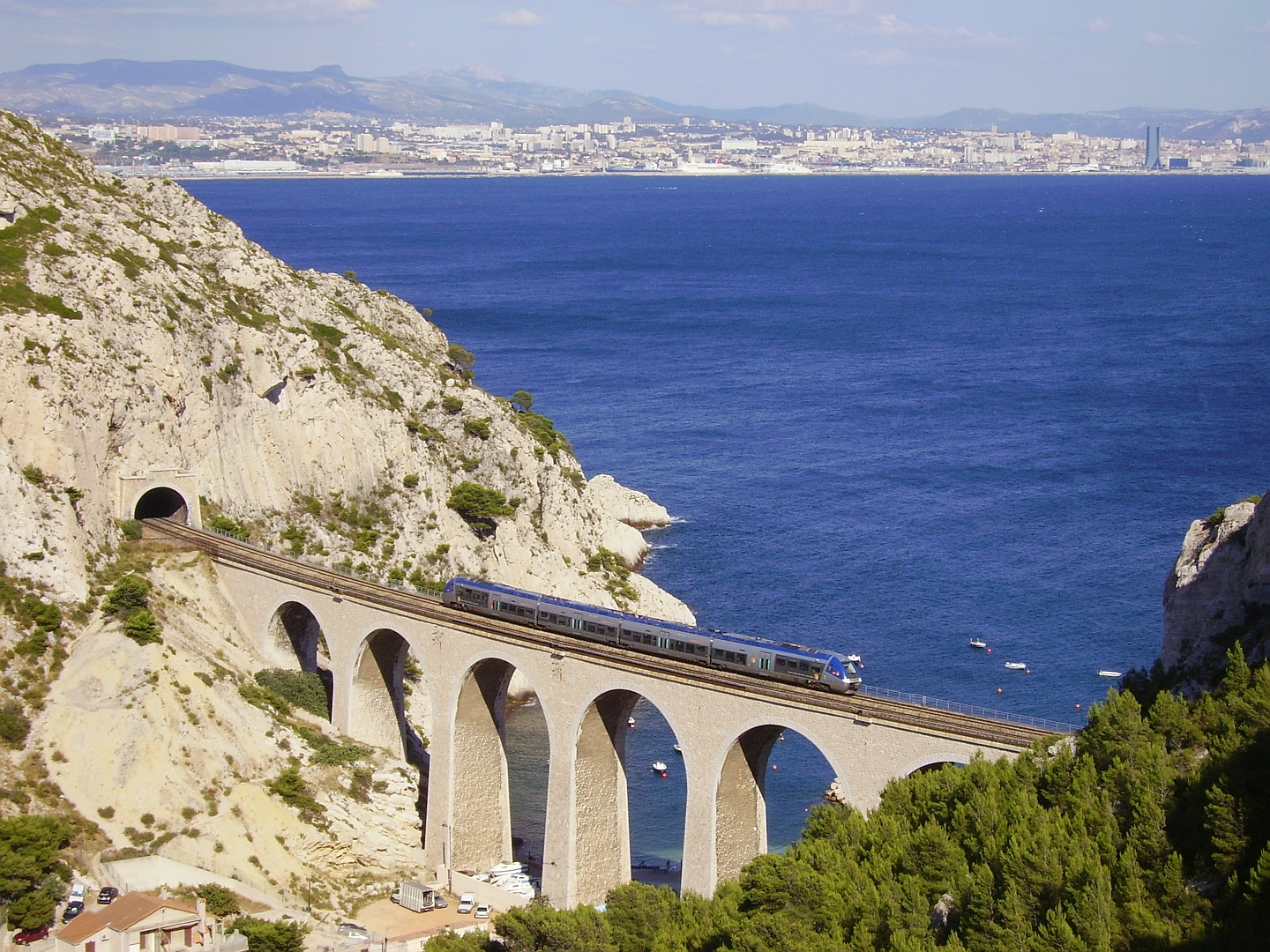
TER PACA service in Le Rove, on the Côte Bleue

The department is part of the current region of Provence-Alpes-Côte d'Azur. It is surrounded by the departments of Gard on the west, Vaucluse on the north and Var on the east, as well as by the Mediterranean Sea on the south. The Rhône river delta forms a vast swampy wetlands area called the Camargue in the southwestern part of the department. The Rove Tunnel, the world's longest canal tunnel from Marseille to the Étang de Berre, as well as smaller canals further west, allowed for waterway transport from Marseille to the Rhône until 1963, when the Rove Tunnel closed to traffic.

Bouches-du-Rhône is bordered by the rivers Rhône to the west and Durance to the north. The Rhône divides into the Grand Rhône and Petit Rhône south of Arles; the area between forms the Camargue. The principal mountains of the department are the Sainte-Baume massif (1,042 metres – 3,418 feet), Montagne Sainte-Victoire (1,011 metres – 3,316 feet), the Garlaban and Alpilles massifs.

=== Seismic activity ===
The department of Bouches-du-Rhône is also known for its seismic activity: the zone II ("average seismic activity") townships of Lambesc Peyrolles-en-Provence and Salon-de-Provence are the most exposed.

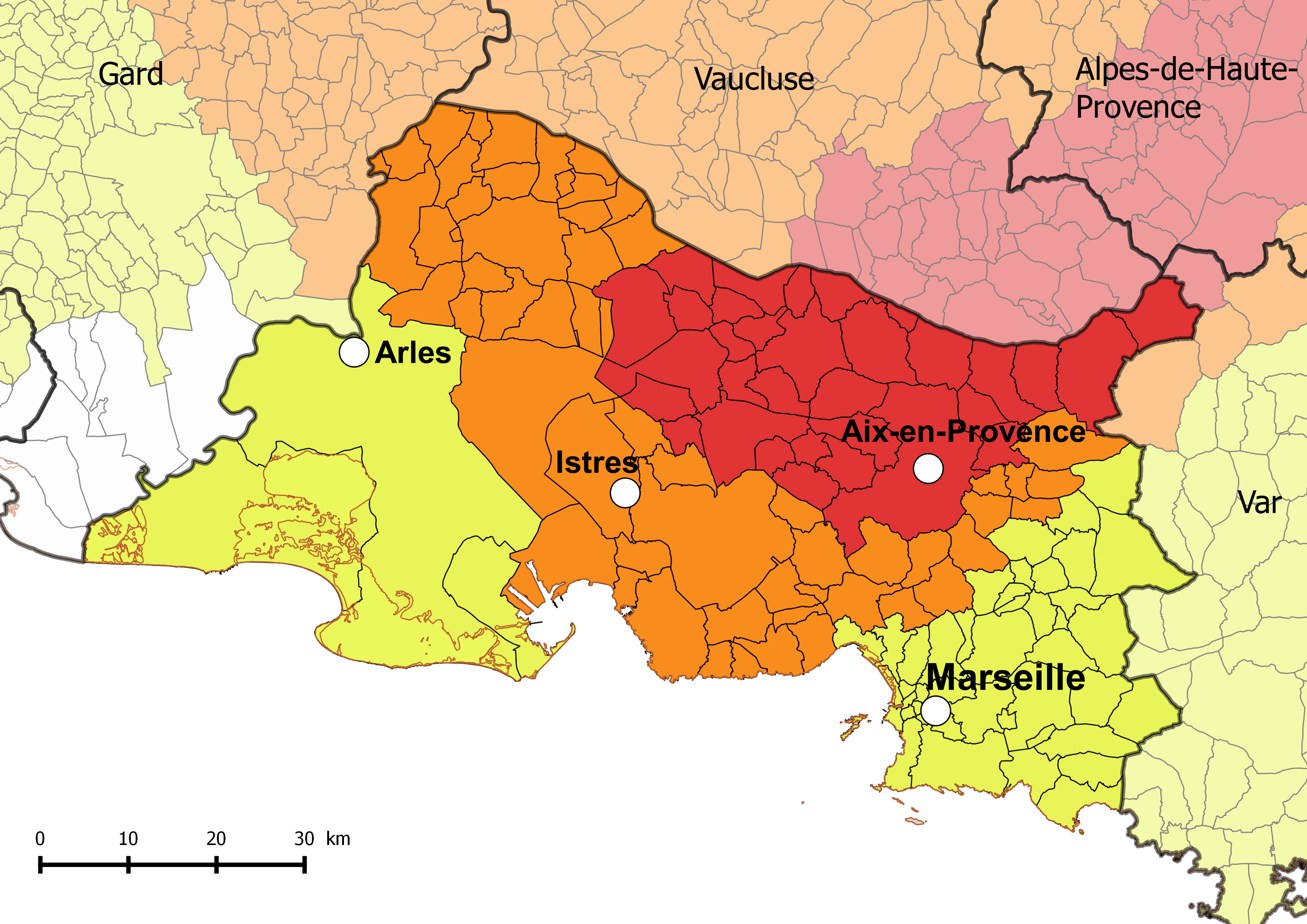
Seismic risk in the department

Areas Ib ("low seismic activity") including the cantons of Aix-en-Provence, Trets Eyguières, Orgon, Berre-Pond, Istres, Istres-North and South, and Ia areas ("very low seismic activity") including the other cantons in the district of Aix-en-Provence, Arles-East, Châteaurenard, Saint-Rémy-de-Provence, Marignane, Martigues-East and Roquevaire-West, are least exposed. Zone 0 ("negligible seismic activity") includes the rest of the department.

== Climate ==
The department has a Mediterranean climate, with contrasting temperatures within a range of 15 degrees. Precipitation is irregular, with only 65 days per year where rain falls in excess of 1 mm. However it falls in sudden downpours, with an average of 500–700 millimetres (20–28 inches) annually. This mainly happens in the spring and autumn; summer is very hot, winter mild. Violent winds are common, especially the mistral, which blows 100 days per year with a maximum of 100 km/h (62 mph). The coast is drier, especially along the Côte Bleue, the Calanques and the bay of La Ciotat, which include some of the driest areas in France, with only 450 mm (18 in) of rain per year. Higher areas receive more precipitation and lower temperatures. The Arc region in the interior is much colder than other areas, with heavy frosts in winter.

== Demographics ==
Historical population

Year	Pop.	±% p.a.
1801	285,012	—
1806	292,903	+0.55%
1821	313,614	+0.46%
1831	359,473	+1.37%
1841	375,003	+0.42%
1851	428,989	+1.35%
1861	507,112	+1.69%
1872	554,911	+0.82%
1881	589,028	+0.67%
1891	630,622	+0.68%
1901	734,347	+1.53%
1911	805,755	+0.93%
1921	841,996	+0.44%
1931	1,101,672	+2.72%

Year	Pop.	±% p.a.
1936	1,224,802	+2.14%
1946	971,935	−2.29%
1954	1,048,762	+0.96%
1962	1,248,555	+2.20%
1968	1,470,271	+2.76%
1975	1,632,974	+1.51%
1982	1,724,199	+0.78%
1990	1,759,371	+0.25%
1999	1,835,719	+0.47%
2007	1,958,926	+0.82%
2012	1,984,784	+0.26%
2017	2,024,162	+0.39%
2023	2,087,658	+0.52%

=== Principal towns ===
The most populous commune is Marseille, the prefecture. As of 2023, there are 11 communes with more than 25,000 inhabitants:

Commune	Population (2023)
Marseille	886,040
Aix-en-Provence	149,695
Arles	51,811
Martigues	48,298
Aubagne	47,529
Istres	44,292
Salon-de-Provence	44,194
La Ciotat	38,477
Vitrolles	36,758
Marignane	33,692
Miramas	26,203

There are 9 more communes with over 15,000 inhabitants: Les Pennes-Mirabeau, Gardanne, Allauch, Châteauneuf-les-Martigues, Châteaurenard, Fos-sur-Mer, Port-de-Bouc, Tarascon and Bouc-Bel-Air.

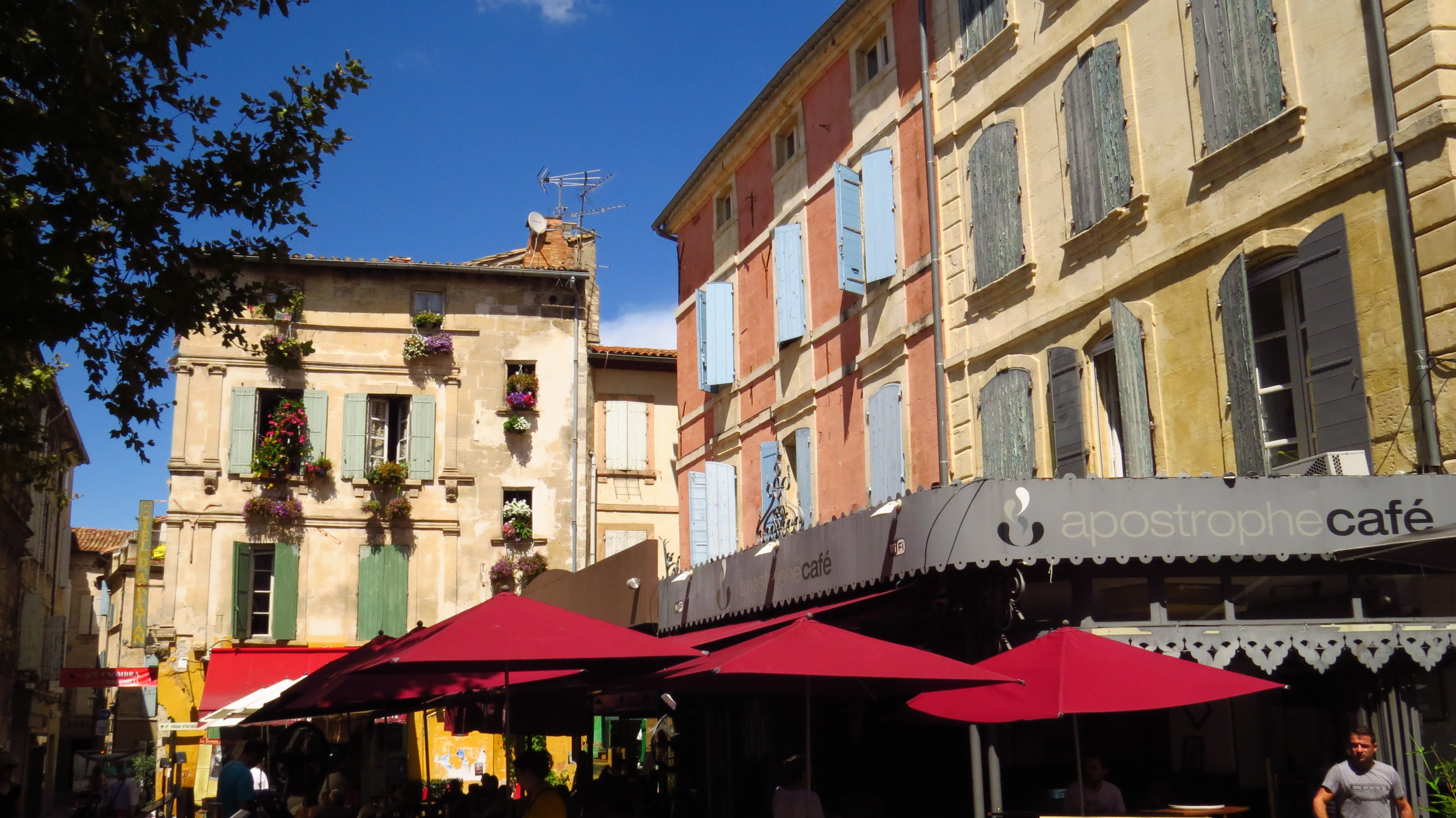
Arles

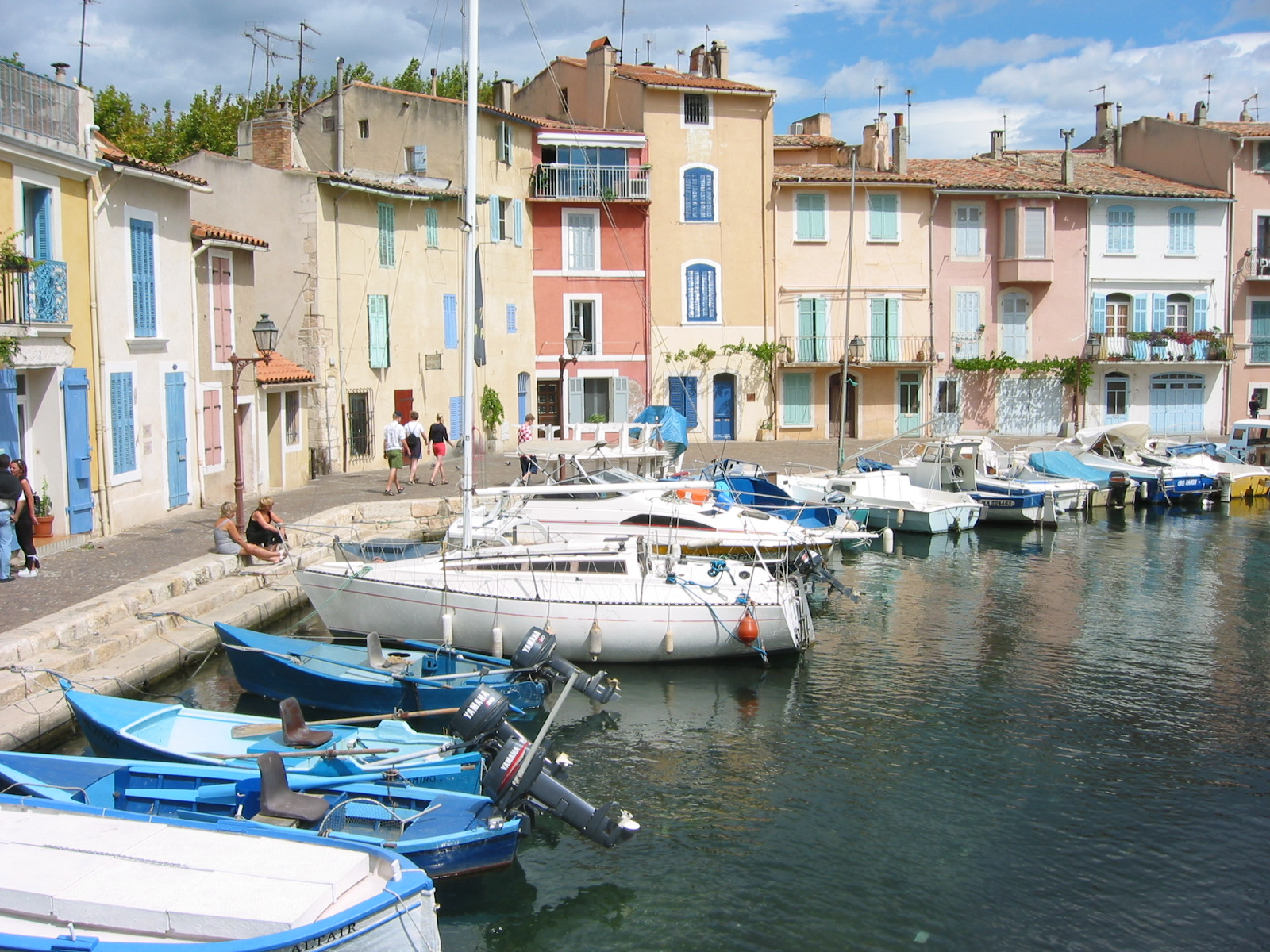
Martigues

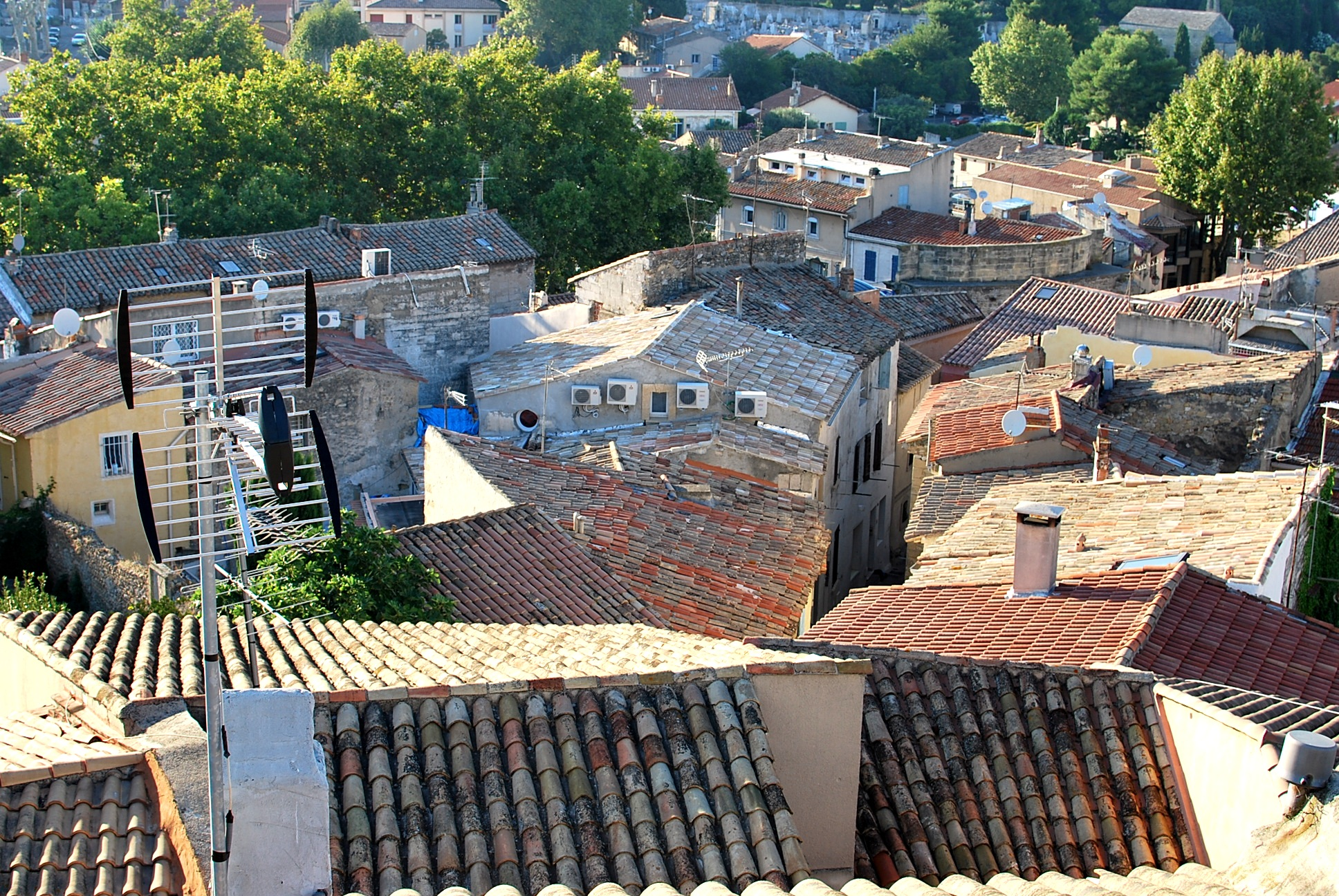
Istres

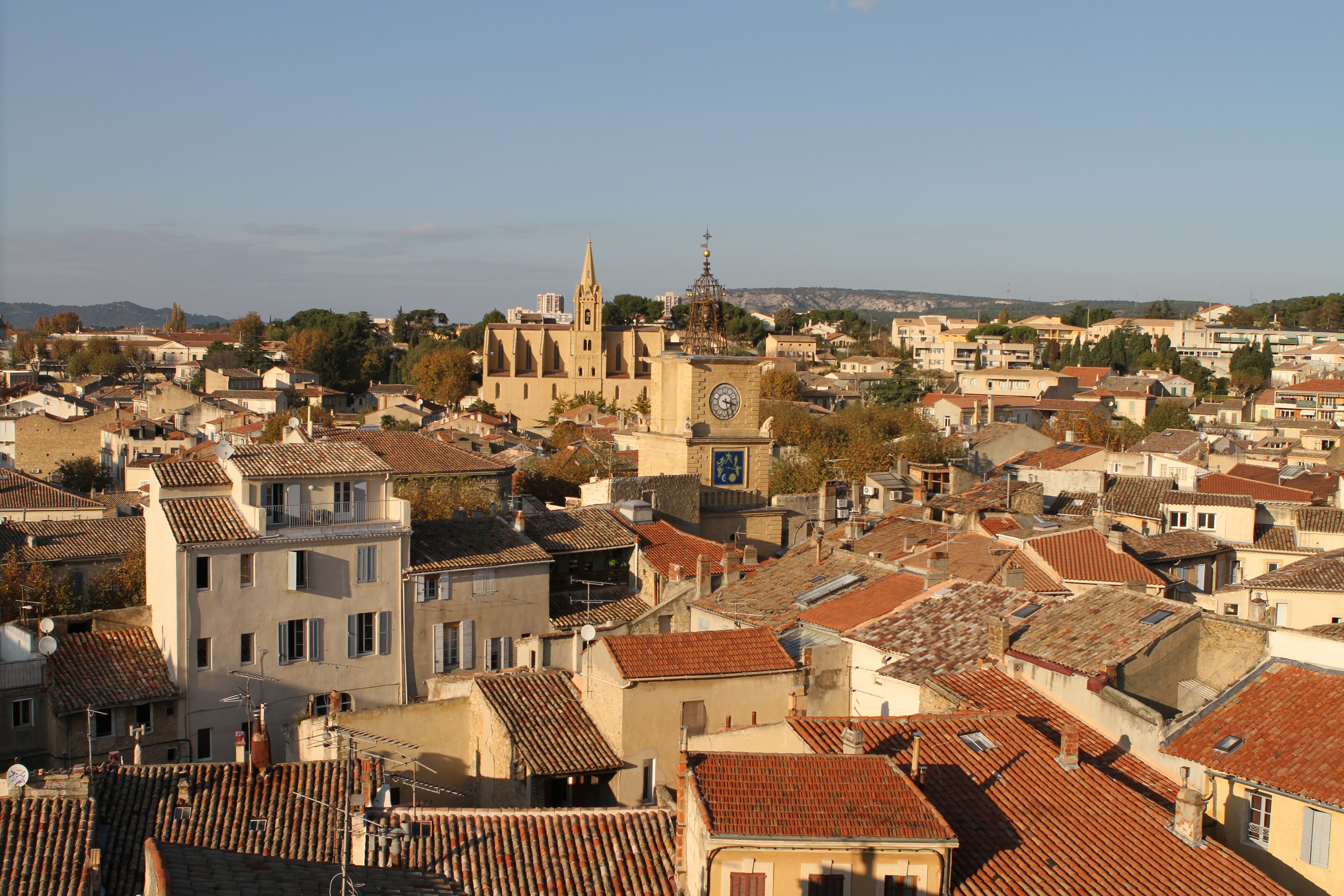
Salon-de-Provence

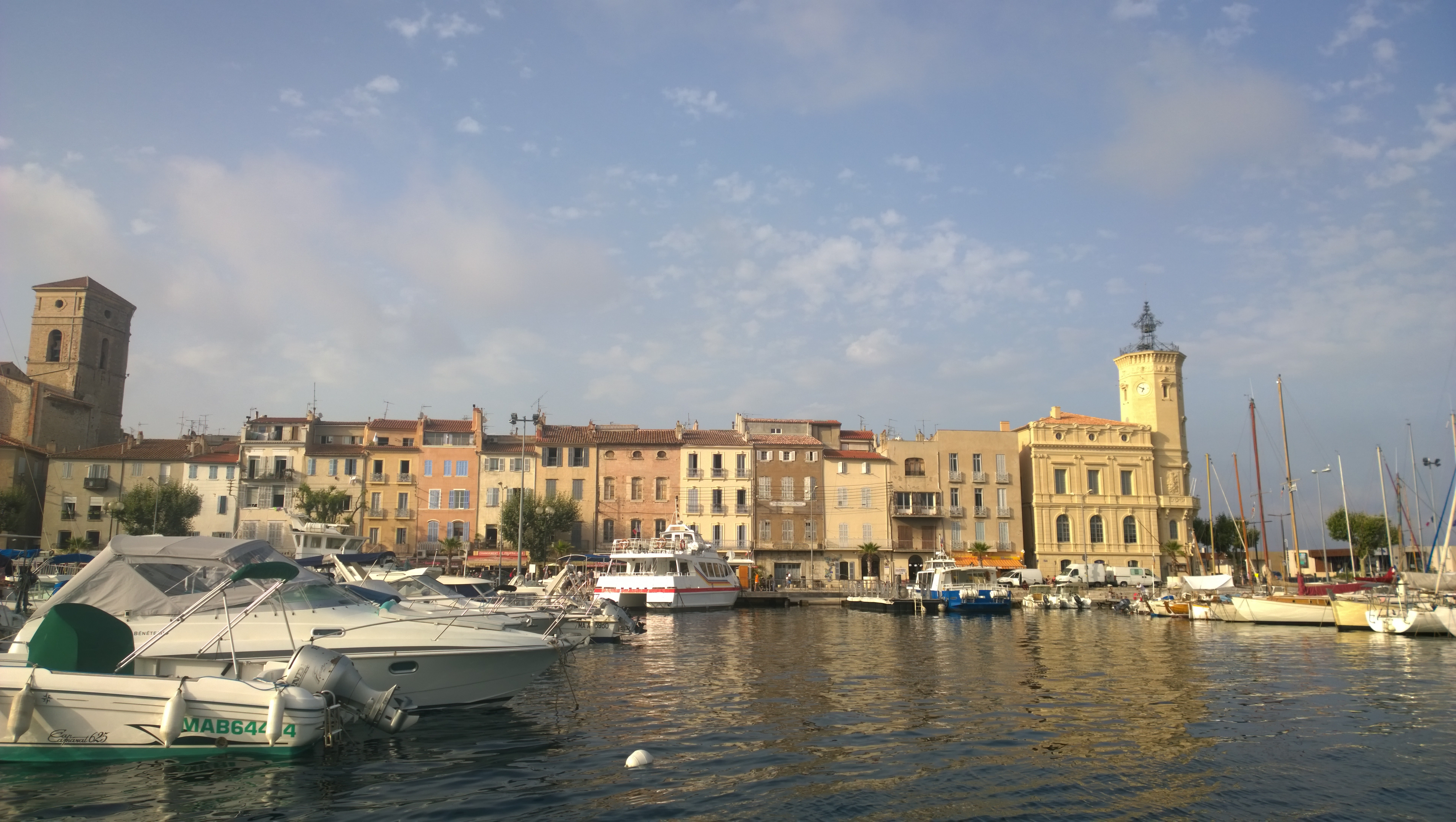
La Ciotat

== Politics ==
=== History ===
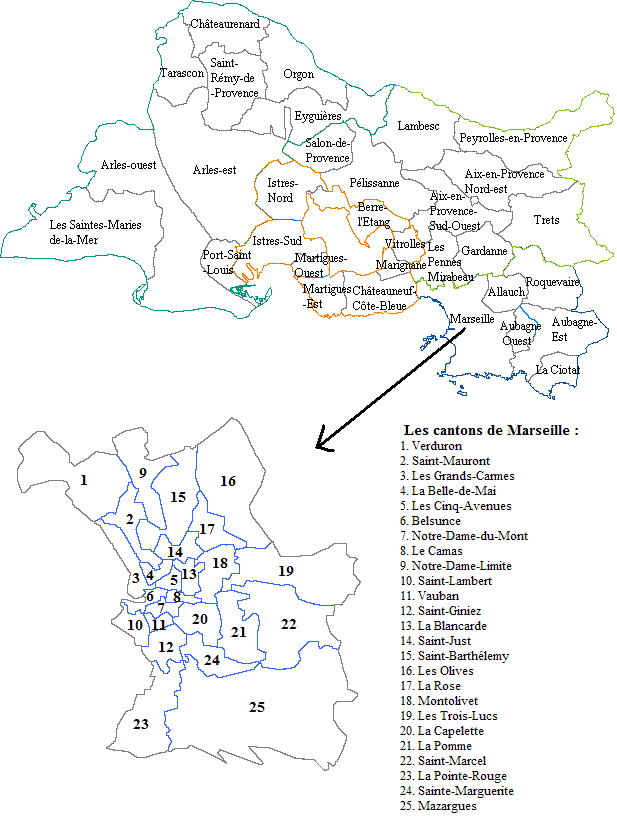
The cantons of Bouches-du-Rhône

Since Bouches-du-Rhône is one of the most populous and diverse departments of France, it has long been the scene of particularly fierce political battles. The development of the Marseille-Fos Port, the relationship maintained between France and its colonial empire, the industry around coal mining in Provence, as well as significant immigration, especially coming from Italy, from the end the 19th century and during the period between the two world wars are all factors that led to the emergence of a large and militant working class. From the late 19th century, the socialist movement gained influence, such as in 1881 by the election of the country's first socialist member of parliament, Clovis Hugues. Rural areas, particularly in the region of Aix-en-Provence, have tended to favour the influence of right-wing parties, including monarchists and Catholics at the beginning of the French Third Republic. The interwar period and the time of the Popular Front marked the beginning of the dominance of the left in the department, first with the election of the French Section of the Workers' International (SFIO).

Map of the communes of Bouches-du-Rhône and the political majority of their municipal council after the 2014 municipal elections. Grey signifies no political majority. PCF PS Left-wing independents UDI LR Right-wing independents

After the Second World War, the Marseillais right, linked to the underworld and who collaborated with the German occupation, was widely discredited. The left largely dominated the Liberation and Marseille even saw the election in 1946 of Communist Mayor Jean Cristofol. In 1947 the SFIO led an alliance with right and centre parties against the Communists, resulting six years later in the election of Gaston Defferre as Mayor of Marseille, a position he held until his death in 1986. The dominance of socialism was, however, challenged by deindustrialisation. The conservative success in 1995 by Jean-Claude Gaudin in Marseille is a symbol of widespread political shifts while even the former communists bastions of La Ciotat and Port-Saint-Louis-du-Rhône voted for the right. The 1990s saw the rise of the National Front, including its victories in municipal elections of Marignane and Vitrolles.

The President of the Departmental Council has been Martine Vassal of the right-wing The Republicans party since 2015, after former Socialist President Jean-Noël Guérini was voted out of office and has faced corruption charges.

In the 2022 French presidential election, just like five years prior, Marine Le Pen of the National Rally (formerly National Front) won a majority in Bouches-du-Rhône in the first round, before incumbent Emmanuel Macron of La République En Marche! won a majority in the second round.

=== Members of the National Assembly ===
Constituency	Member	Party
Bouches-du-Rhône's 1st constituency	Monique Griseti	National Rally
Bouches-du-Rhône's 2nd constituency	Laurent Lhardit	Socialist Party
Bouches-du-Rhône's 3rd constituency	Gisèle Lelouis	National Rally
Bouches-du-Rhône's 4th constituency	Manuel Bompard	La France insoumise
Bouches-du-Rhône's 5th constituency	Hendrik Davi	L'Après
Bouches-du-Rhône's 6th constituency	Olivier Fayssat	Union of the Right for the Republic
Bouches-du-Rhône's 7th constituency	Sébastien Delogu	La France Insoumise
Bouches-du-Rhône's 8th constituency	Romain Tonussi	National Rally
Bouches-du-Rhône's 9th constituency	Joëlle Mélin	National Rally
Bouches-du-Rhône's 10th constituency	José Gonzalez	National Rally
Bouches-du-Rhône's 11th constituency	Marc Pena	Socialist Party
Bouches-du-Rhône's 12th constituency	Franck Allisio	National Rally
Bouches-du-Rhône's 13th constituency	Emmanuel Fouquart	National Rally
Bouches-du-Rhône's 14th constituency	Gérault Verny	Union of the Right for the Republic
Bouches-du-Rhône's 15th constituency	Romain Baubry	National Rally
Bouches-du-Rhône's 16th constituency	Emmanuel Taché	National Rally

=== Departmental Council of Bouches-du-Rhône ===
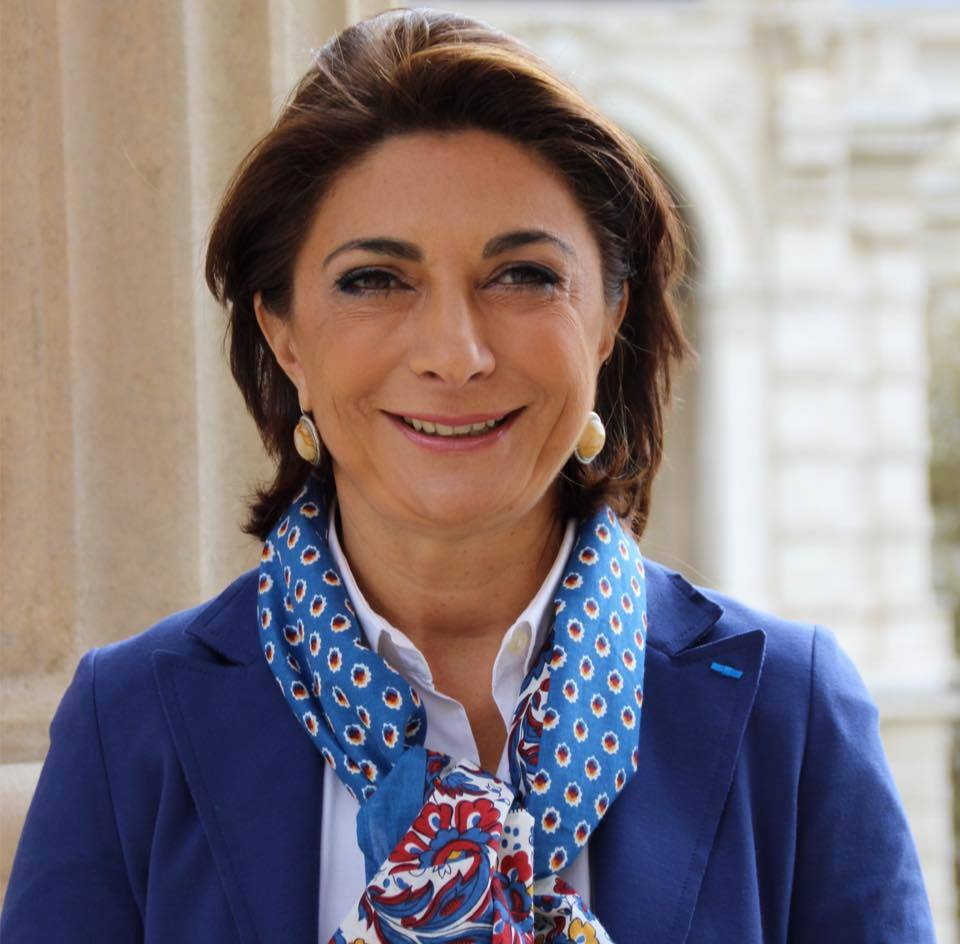
Martine Vassal, current President of the Departmental Council

Below is a list of seats won by the department's different parties after the 2015 departmental elections.

Party		Seats in the Departmental Council
•	The Republicans (LR)	25
	Socialist Party (PS)	15
•	Union of Democrats and Independents (UDI)	7
	French Communist Party (PCF)	5
	Europe Ecology – The Greens (EELV)	2
	La Force du 13	2
	National Front (FN) and France Arise (DLF)	2

== Culture ==
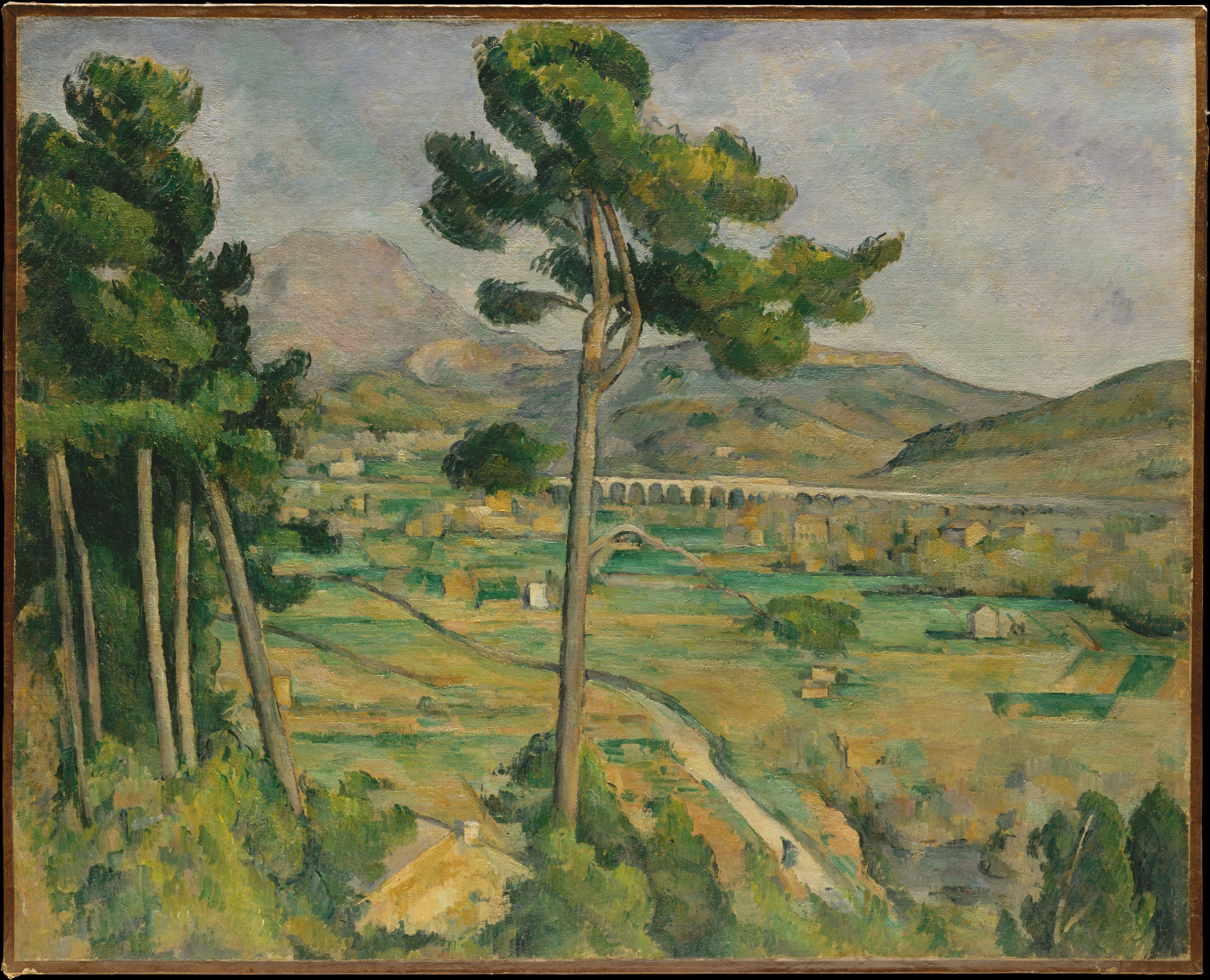
Paul Cézanne's Mont Sainte-Victoire and the Viaduct of the Arc River Valley

The department is well represented in French art. Paul Cézanne painted numerous representations of the Mont Sainte-Victoire. Vincent van Gogh spent two years in Arles, painting many scenes in the area. The department's main museums include the Museum of European and Mediterranean Civilisations, the Musée de la Faïence de Marseille and the Marseille History Museum.

== Transport ==
The department is served by Marseille Provence Airport which provides direct routes to other parts of France, Europe, northern Africa, Asia and northern America. Nice Côte d'Azur Airport is also fairly used by air travellers from the department.

== Tourism ==
=== Main sights ===
Major sites of tourism include:

- The cities of Marseille and Aix-en-Provence
- Roman and Romanesque monuments of Arles
- The Camargue and the town of Saintes-Maries-de-la-Mer
- Alphonse Daudet's windmill in Fontvieille
- Les Baux-de-Provence, medieval village
- Saint-Rémy-de-Provence and the ruins of the Roman city of Glanum
- Tarascon, medieval castle and church
- Salon-de-Provence, city of Nostradamus and one of the biggest citadels in Provence: Château de l'Empéri
- The Calanque de Sormiou, Marseille
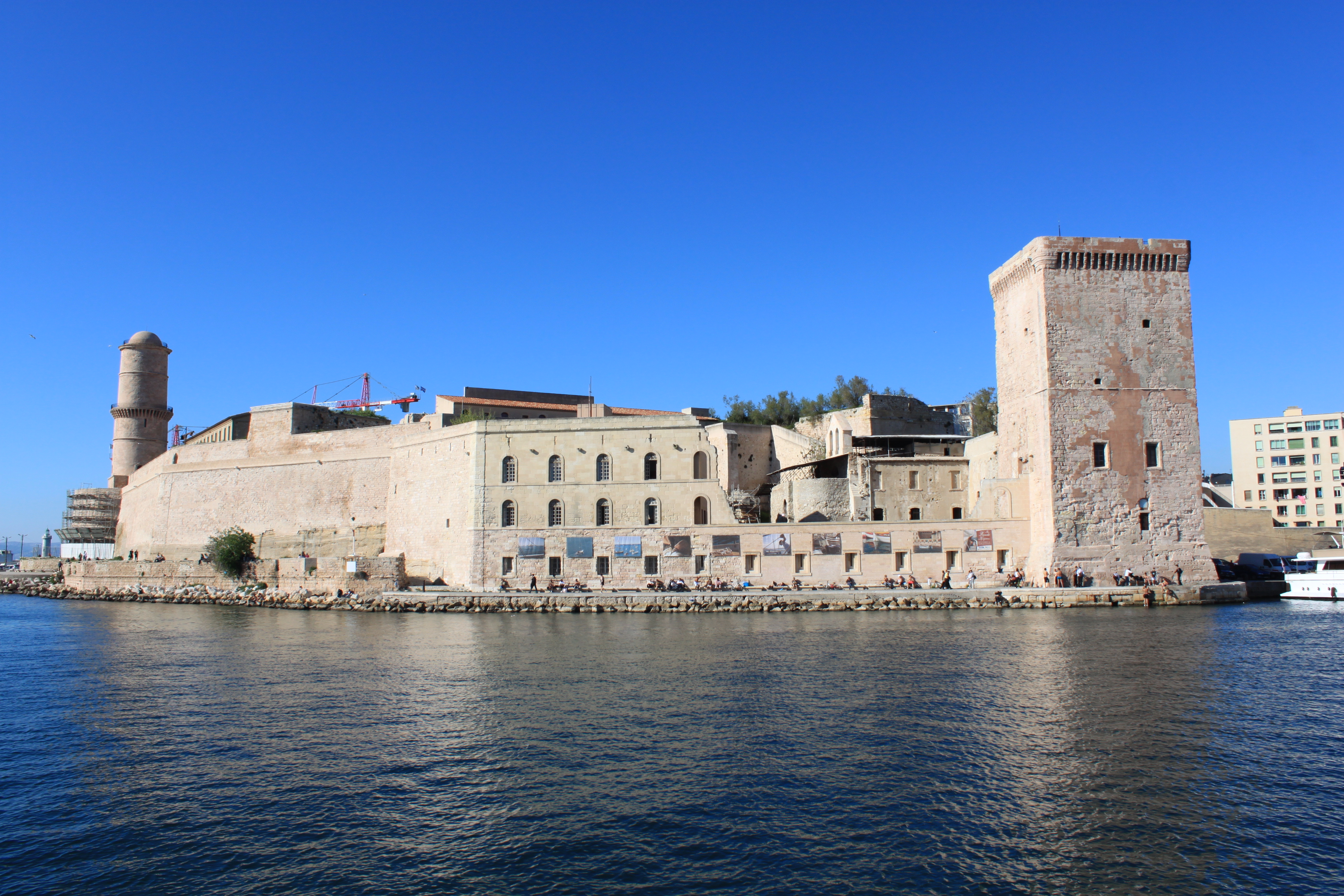
Fort Saint-Jean in Marseille

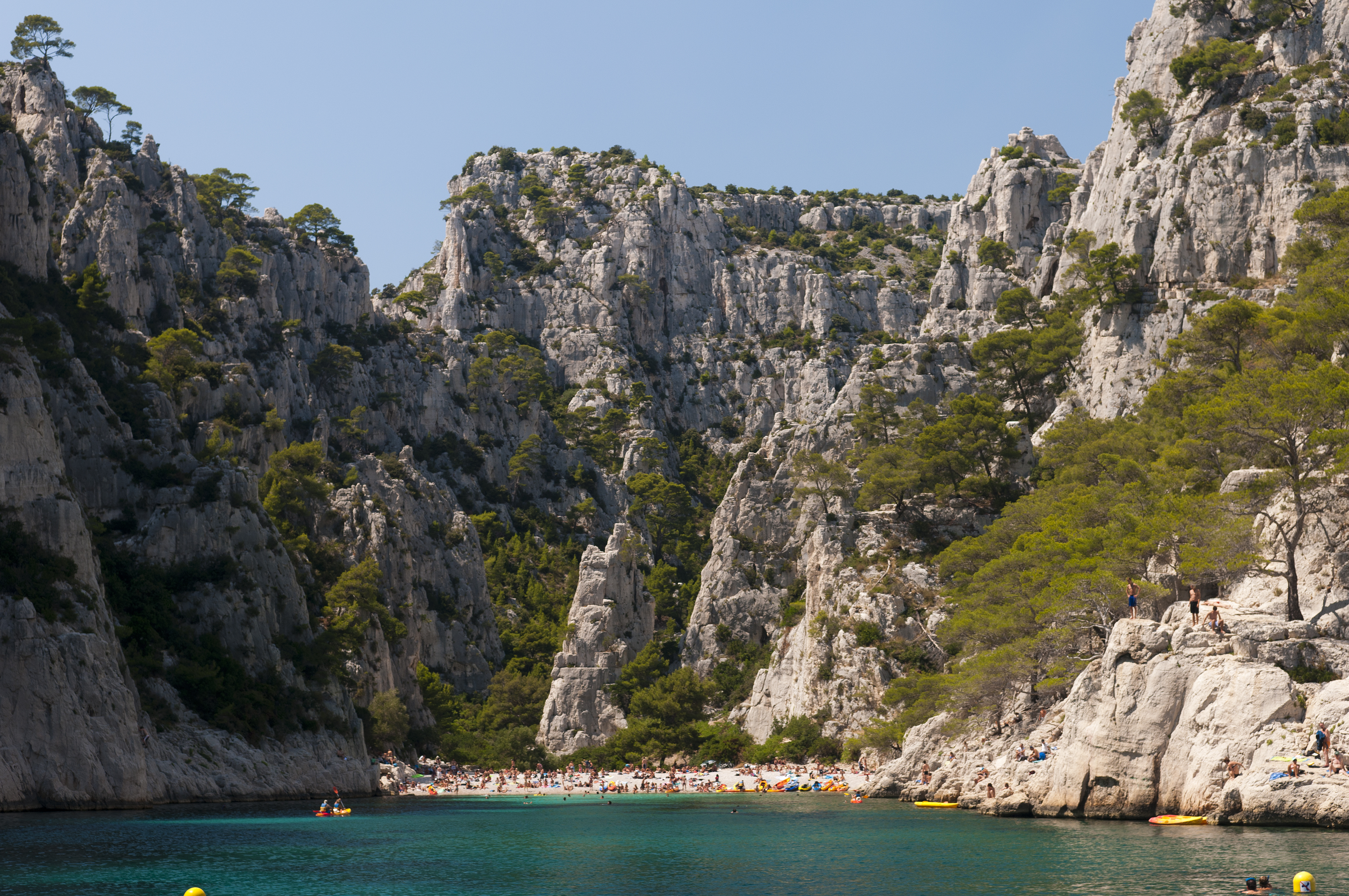
Landscape near Cassis

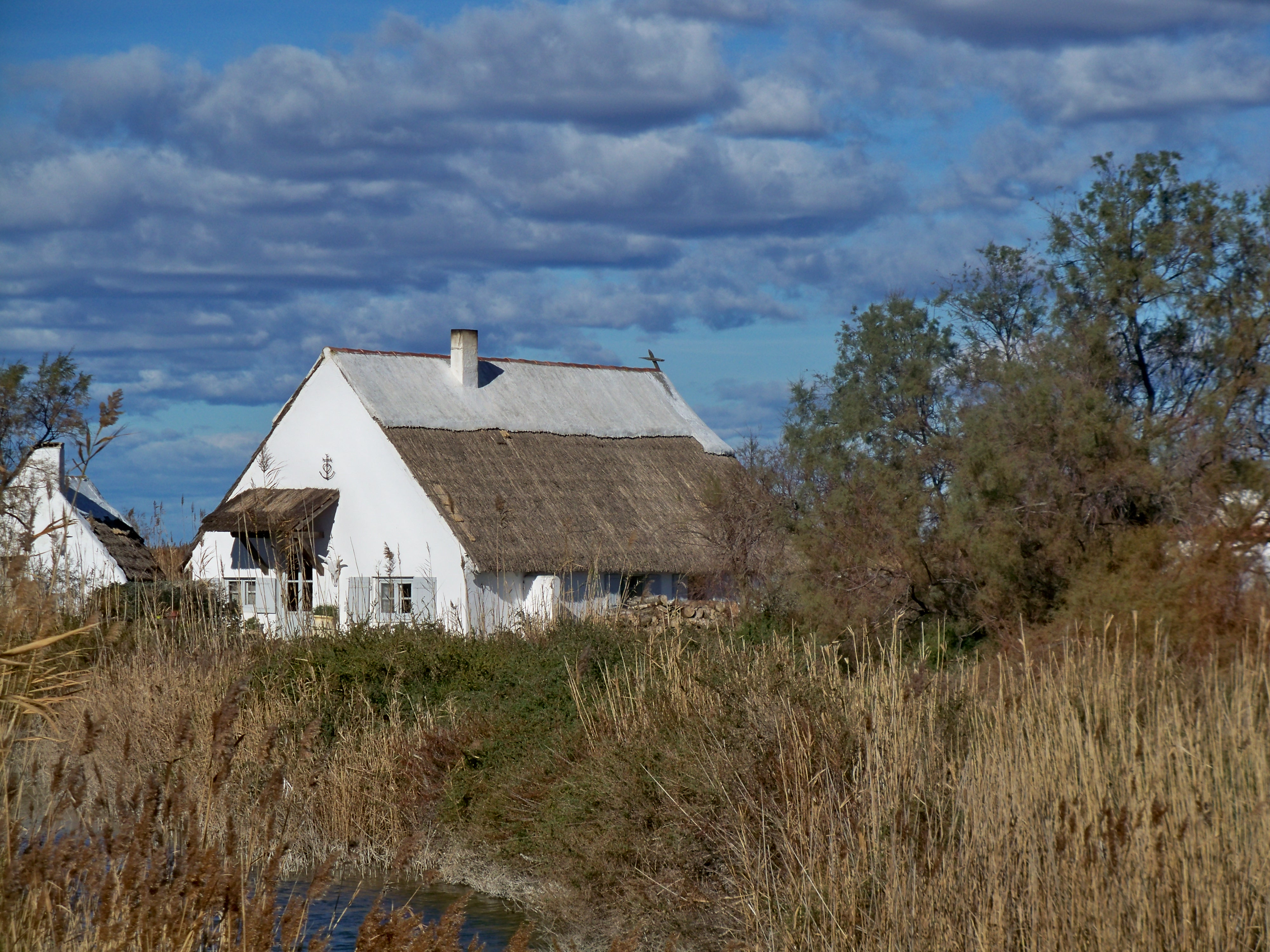
Gardian house in the Camargue

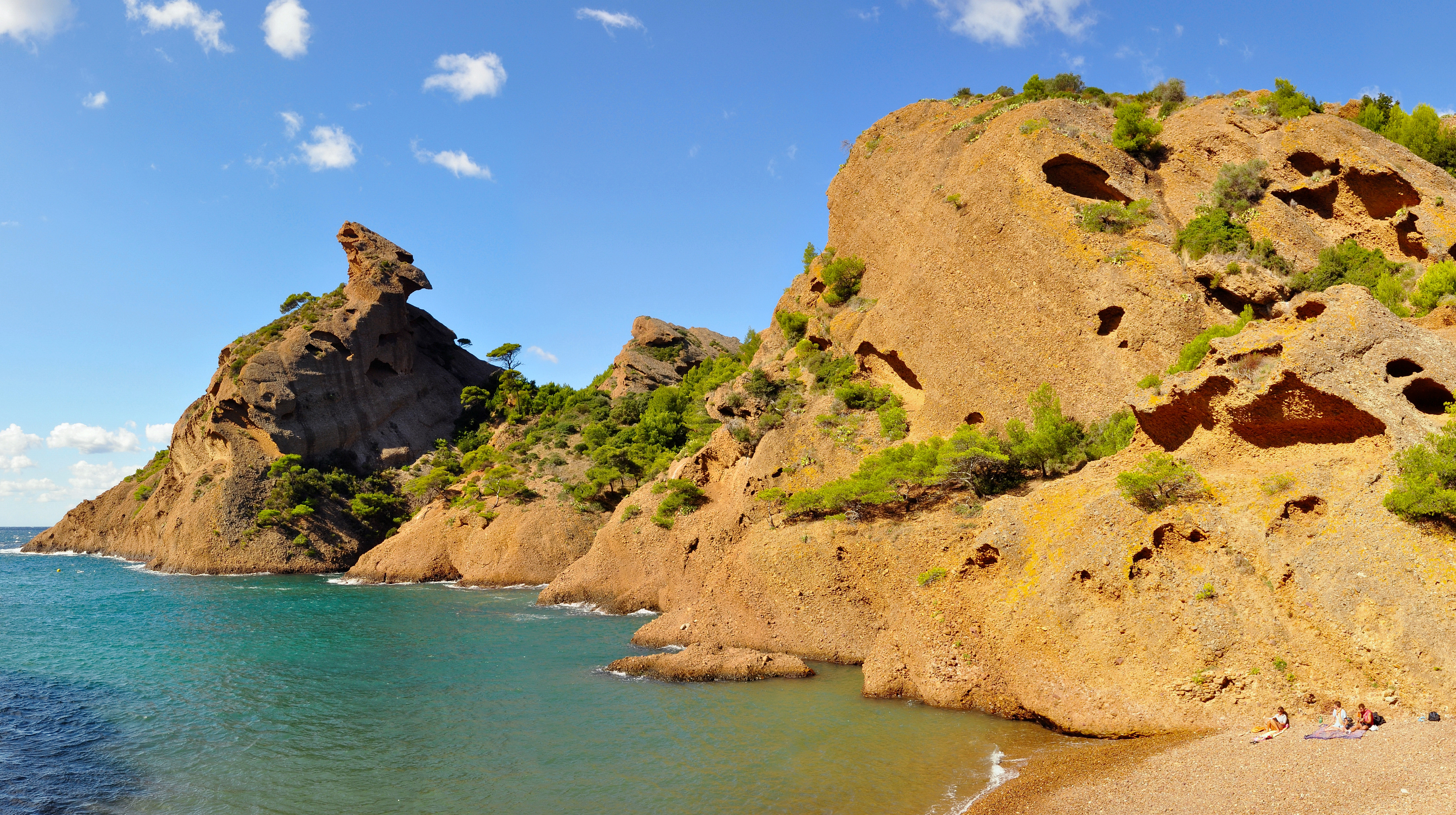
Mediterranean coast near La Ciotat

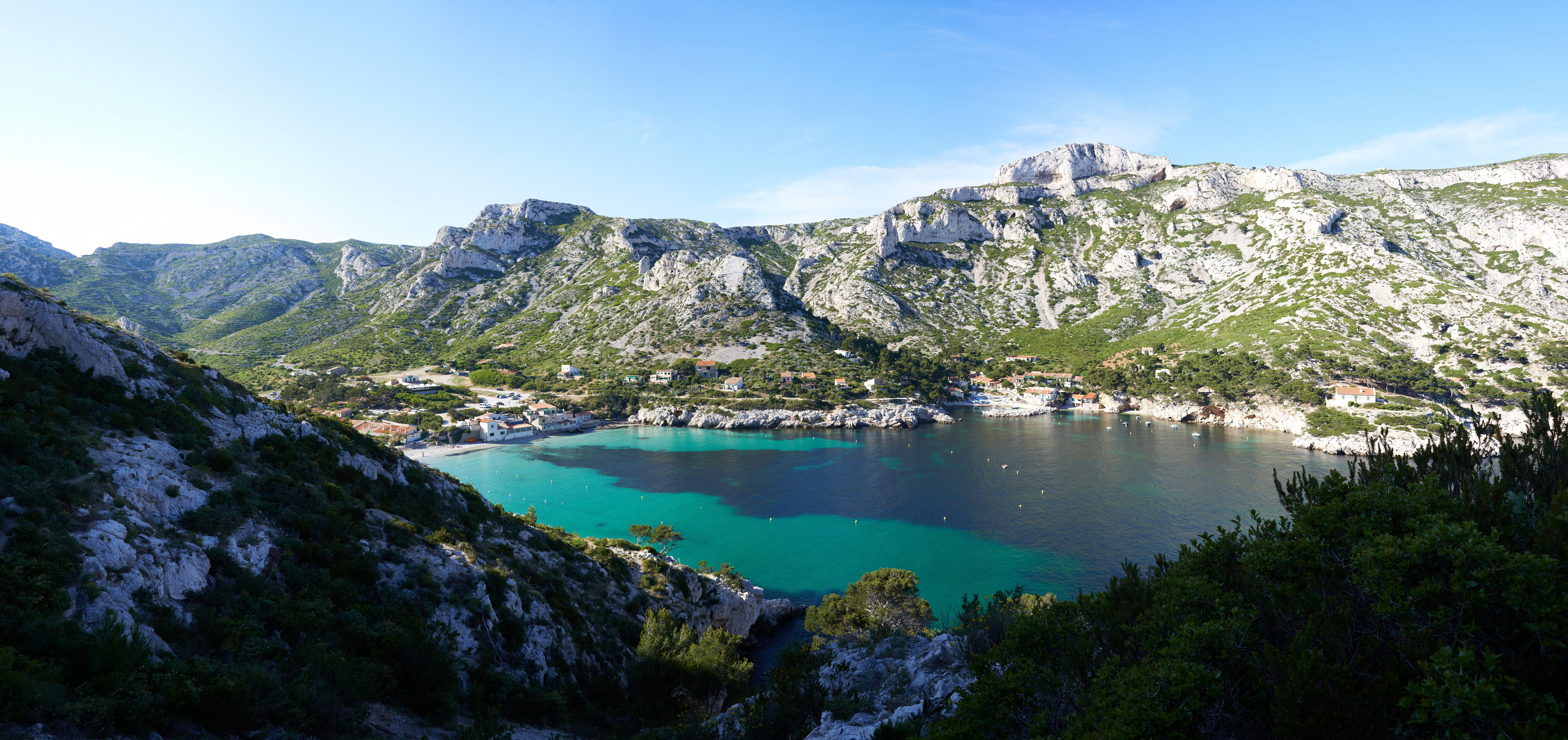
Calanque de Sormiou

=== Natural landmarks ===
Rivers include:

- The Rhône, which forms the border with the department of Gard
- The Durance, which forms the border with the department of Vaucluse
- The Arc
- The Huveaune

Lakes include:

- Étang de Berre
- Étang de Vaccarès, in the Camargue

Mountains include:

- Alpilles mountain range
- Calanques between Marseille and La Ciotat
- Corniche des Crêtes
- Garlaban
- Mont Puget
- Montagne Sainte-Victoire
- Sainte-Baume massif
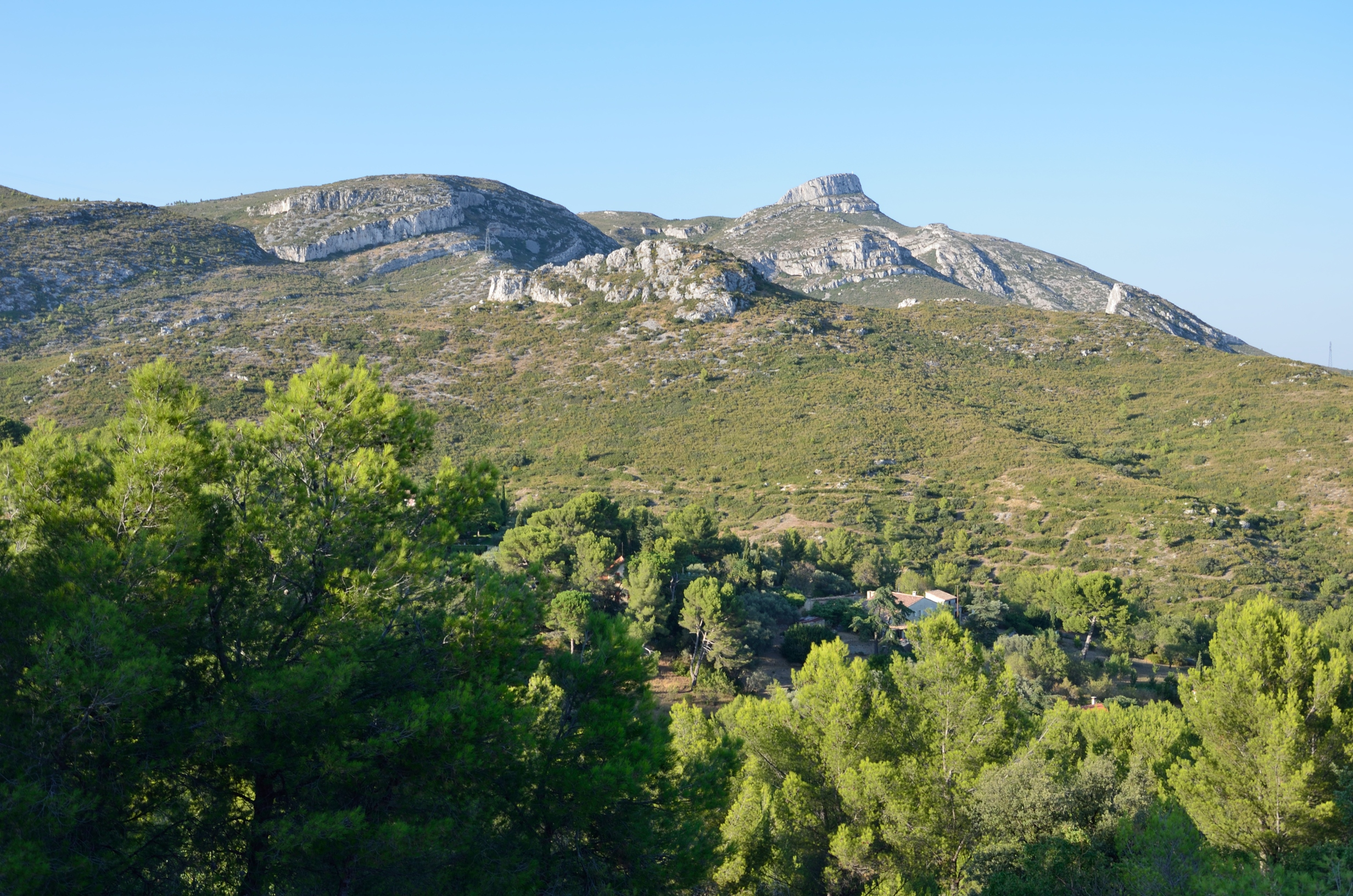
Garlaban

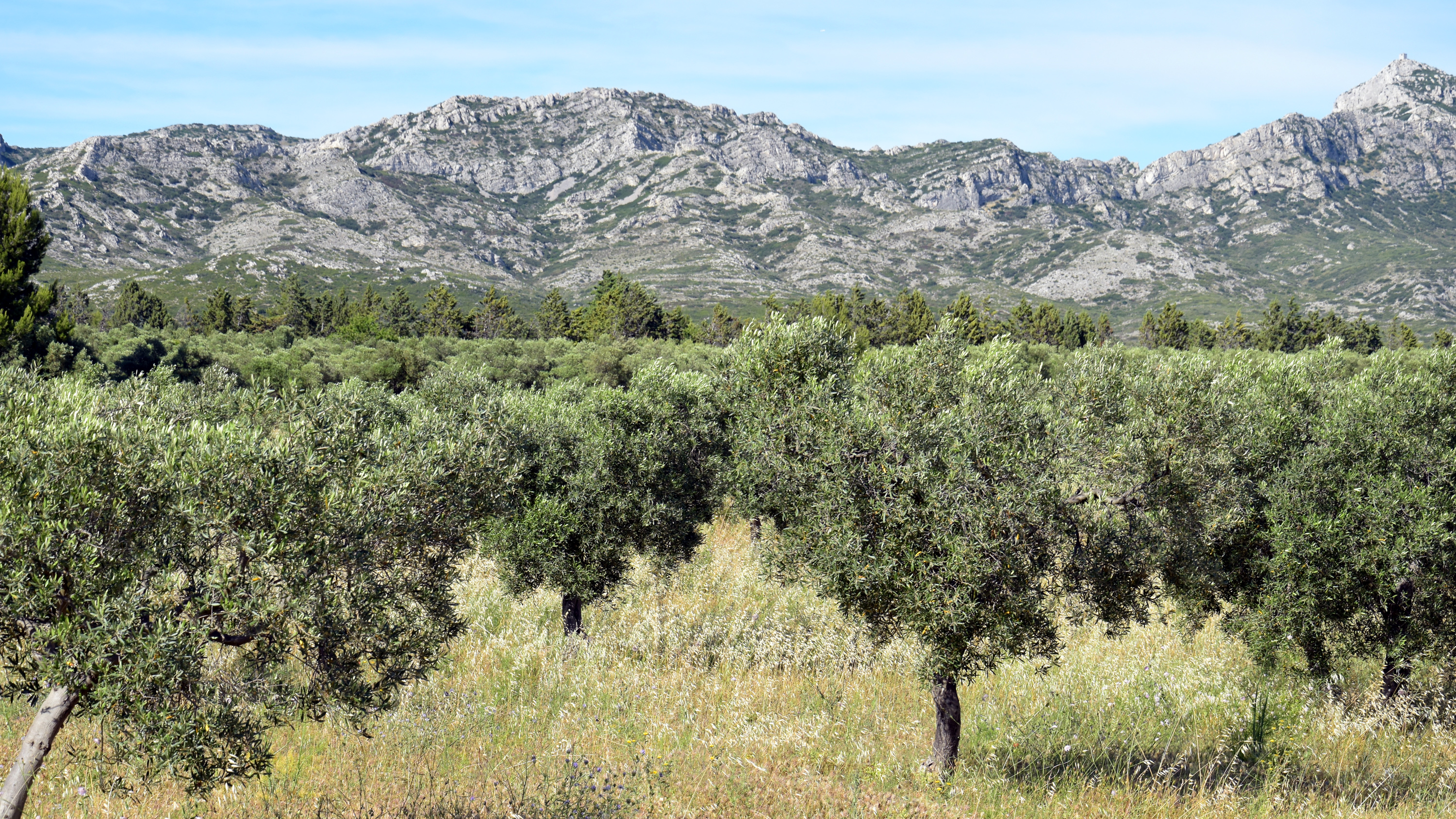
Alpilles

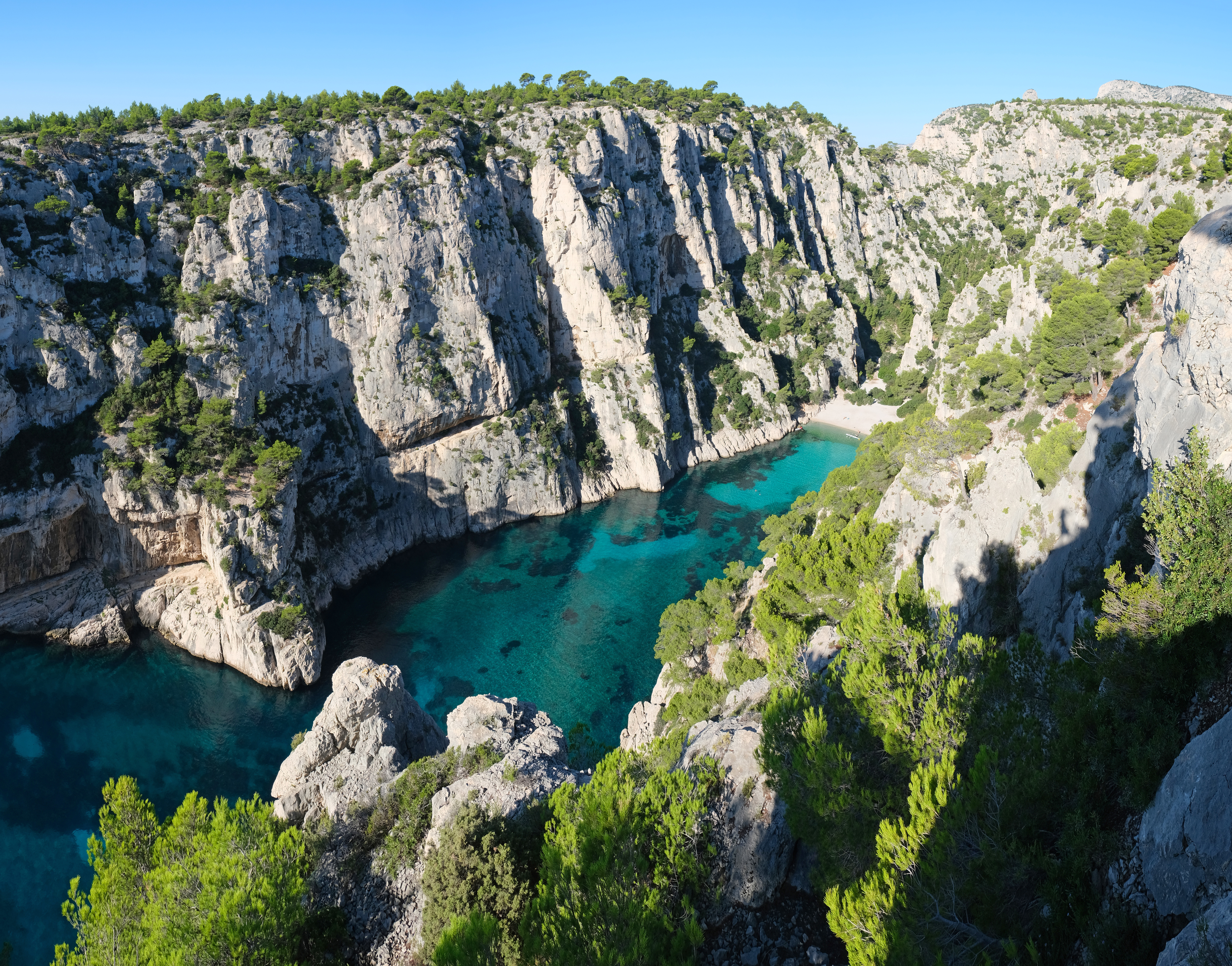
Calanques

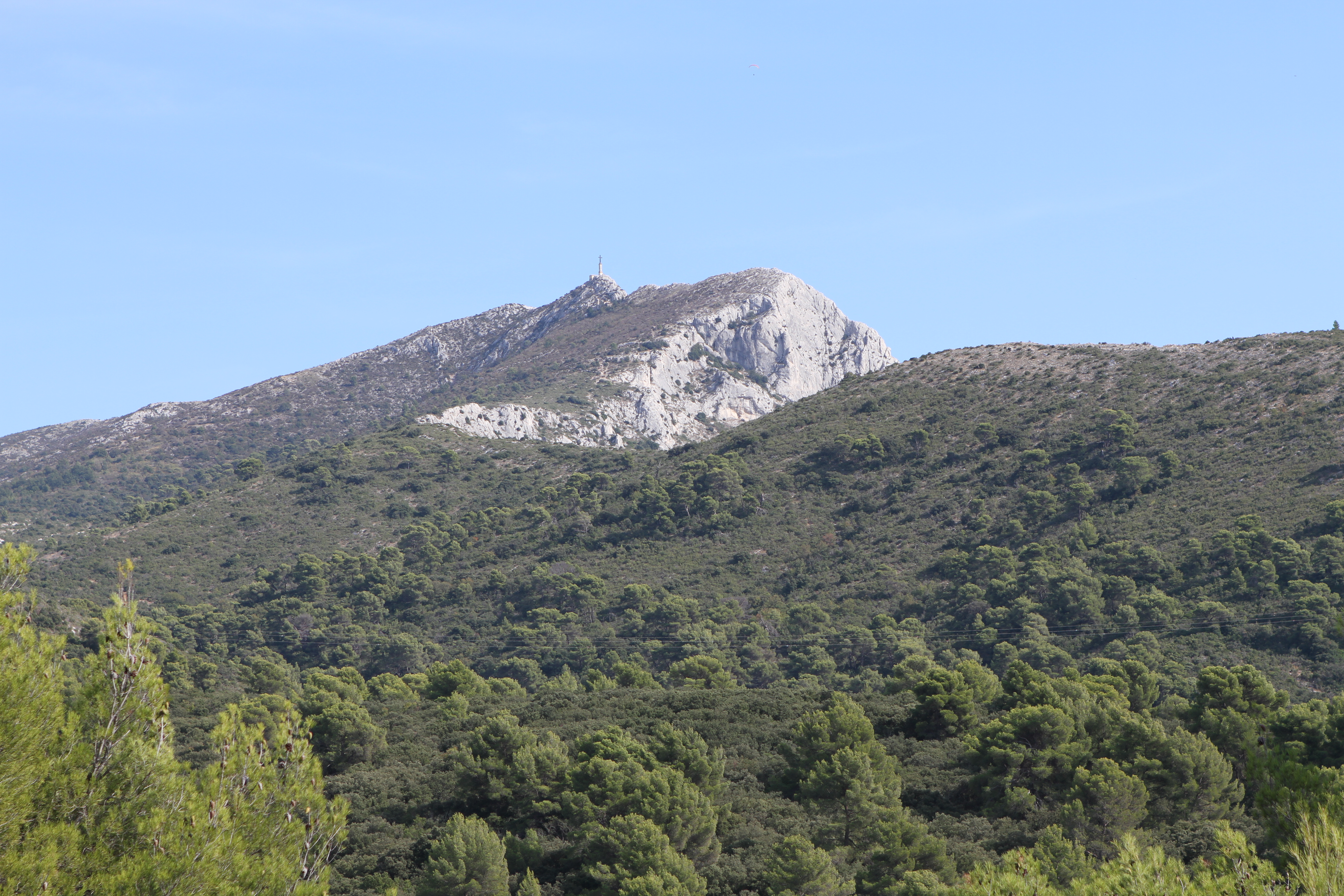
Montagne Sainte-Victoire

== See also ==
- Cantons of the Bouches-du-Rhône department
- Communes of the Bouches-du-Rhône department
- Arrondissements of the Bouches-du-Rhône department
- List of senators of Bouches-du-Rhône
- Bouches-du-Rhône Police Prefecture
