= A55 autoroute =

Road in France

A55 autoroute

Route information
- Maintained by Bouches-du-Rhône
- Length: 39 km (24 mi)
- Existed: 1972–present

Major junctions
- East end: Marseille
- A 557 in Marseille; E714 / A 7 in Les Pennes-Mirabeau

- West end: N 568 in Martigues

Location
- Country: France

Highway system
- Roads in France; Autoroutes; Routes nationales

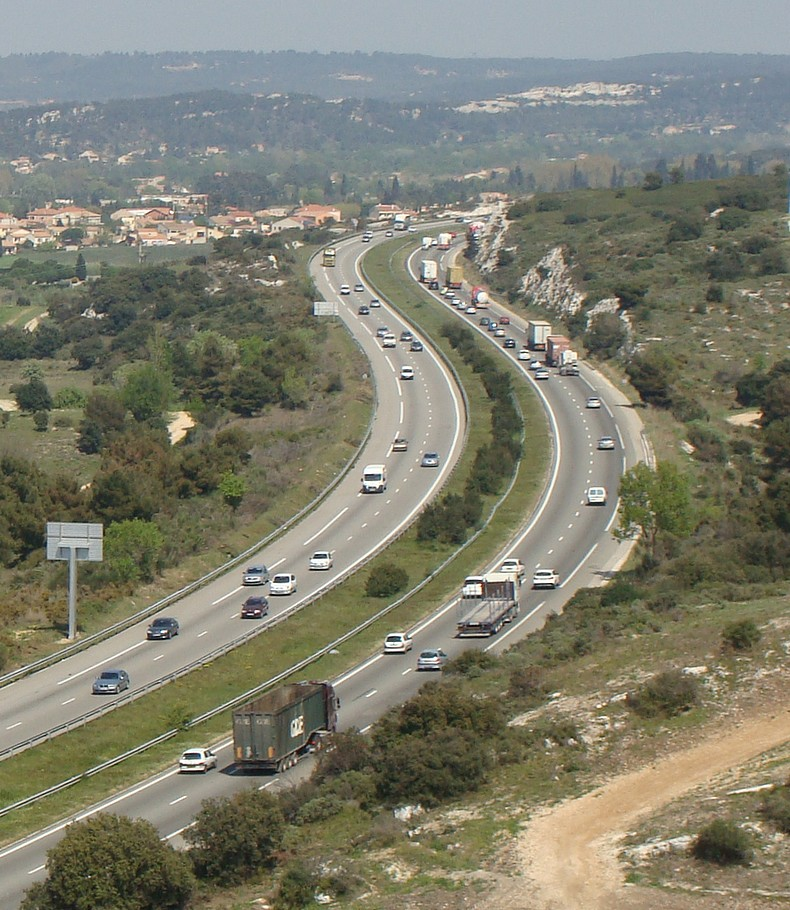
A55 autoroute

The A55 autoroute is a free motorway in southern France. It is 36.7 kilometres (22.8 mi) long.

The road starts at Marseille at La Joliette and ends to the west of Martigues where it becomes the N568 towards Arles and Nîmes.

== History ==
The first section was opened in 1972. The last section was completed connecting this junction to the Vieux-Port of Marseille in 1989.

== List of exits and junctions ==
Region	Department	Junction	Destinations	Notes
Provence-Alpes-Côte-d'Azur	Bouches-du-Rhône	1 : Le Panier	Marseille - Le Vieux Port	
Provence-Alpes-Côte-d'Azur	Bouches-du-Rhône	2 : La Joliette	Marseille - Port de Marseille, centre-ville	
Provence-Alpes-Côte-d'Azur	Bouches-du-Rhône	A557 - A55		Entry from A7
Provence-Alpes-Côte-d'Azur	Bouches-du-Rhône	3 : La Cabucelle	Marseille - Les Arnavaux, (A7/A507)	
Provence-Alpes-Côte-d'Azur	Bouches-du-Rhône	4 : La Madrague	Marseille - Saint-Louis, Les Arnavaux, Arenc, Ports - Portes 1 et 2	
Provence-Alpes-Côte-d'Azur	Bouches-du-Rhône	5 : Mourepiane	Marseille - L'Estaque, La Calade, Ports - Porte 4	
Provence-Alpes-Côte-d'Azur	Bouches-du-Rhône	6/6a/6b : Saint-Henri	Marseille - L'Estaque, Saint-Antoine, Saint-André	
Provence-Alpes-Côte-d'Azur	Bouches-du-Rhône	A551 & A552 (A7) - A55	Lyon, Vitrolles, Barcelona (A54), Marseille-Provence (Marignane)	
Provence-Alpes-Côte-d'Azur	Bouches-du-Rhône	A551 & A552 (A7) - A55	Nice (A8),Toulon (A50), Aix-en-Provence (A51), Marseille - centre	
Provence-Alpes-Côte-d'Azur	Bouches-du-Rhône	Aire de Rebuty (Eastbound); Aire de La Nerthe (Westbound)		
Provence-Alpes-Côte-d'Azur	Bouches-du-Rhône	7 : Le Rove	Marignane - Ville, Gignac-la-Nerthe, Le Rove, Marseille - L'Estaque	
Provence-Alpes-Côte-d'Azur	Bouches-du-Rhône	8 : Châteauneuf-les-Martigues	Sausset-les-Pins, Carry-le-Rouet, Châteauneuf-les-Martigues, Ensuès-la-Redonne, Gignac-la-Nerthe, Marignane - Ville	
Provence-Alpes-Côte-d'Azur	Bouches-du-Rhône	9 : La Mède - est	Châteauneuf-les-Martigues, La Mède	
Provence-Alpes-Côte-d'Azur	Bouches-du-Rhône	10 : La Mède - ouest	Châteauneuf-les-Martigues, La Mède - Raffineries	
Provence-Alpes-Côte-d'Azur	Bouches-du-Rhône	11 : Martigues - Jonquières	Martigues - centre	
Provence-Alpes-Côte-d'Azur	Bouches-du-Rhône	12 : Martigues - Lavéra	Martigues - Jonquières, Quartiers Sud, Z. I. Martigues-Sud, Sausset-les-Pins	
Provence-Alpes-Côte-d'Azur	Bouches-du-Rhône	13 : Martigues - Ferrières	Martigues - Croix-Santé, Cento-Perdrix, centre	
Provence-Alpes-Côte-d'Azur	Bouches-du-Rhône	A 55 becomes N 568		
1.000 mi = 1.609 km; 1.000 km = 0.621 mi

== Future ==
This motorway will be extended towards Arles by upgrading the N568 over the Plaine de la Crau. No date has been scheduled as yet, only a by-pass for Port-de-Bouc which is currently being evaluated.
