= Urban Community of Marseille Provence Métropole =

Coordinates: 43.283°N 5.402°E

Marseille Provence Métropole
- Former communauté urbaine
- Country: France
- Region: Provence-Alpes-Côte d'Azur
- Department: Bouches-du-Rhône
- No. of communes: {{{nbcomm}}}
- Established: 2000
- Disbanded: 2016
- Area: 604.75 km^{2} (233.50 sq mi)
- Population (1999): 981,769
  - Density: 1,623.4/km^{2} (4,204.7/sq mi)

The Urban Community of Marseille Provence Métropole (French: Communauté Urbaine Marseille Provence Métropole) is a former intercommunal structure gathering the city of Marseille (in Provence, southern France) and some of its suburbs. It was established on 7 July 2000. On 1 January 2016 it merged into the Metropolis of Aix-Marseille-Provence.

The Urban Community of Marseille Provence Métropole only partly encompassed the metropolitan area of Marseille because the other independent communes of the metropolitan area (such as Aix-en-Provence) refused to join in with the city of Marseille, which was perceived as poor and unruly by the wealthier suburbs. Some other suburban communes (such as Aubagne, Gardanne, and Martigues) which were ruled by the French Communist Party also refused to join in with Marseille which was ruled by the center-right UMP.

Consequently, the other parts of the metropolitan area have formed different intercommunal structures, such as:

- Community of Agglomeration of the Aix-en-Provence Country (Communauté d'agglomération du Pays d'Aix-en-Provence): 332,653 inhabitants
- Agglomeration community of Pays d'Aubagne et de l'Etoile (Communauté d'agglomération Pays d'Aubagne et de l'Etoile)
- Community of Agglomeration of the West of the Étang de Berre (Communauté d'agglomération de l'Ouest de l'Étang de Berre): 65,637 inhabitants, with Martigues in it

== Member communes ==
The Communauté urbaine comprised the following communes:

- Allauch
- Carnoux-en-Provence
- Carry-le-Rouet
- Cassis
- Ceyreste
- Châteauneuf-les-Martigues
- La Ciotat
- Ensuès-la-Redonne
- Gémenos
- Gignac-la-Nerthe
- Marignane
- Marseille
- Plan-de-Cuques
- Roquefort-la-Bédoule
- Le Rove
- Saint-Victoret
- Sausset-les-Pins
- Septèmes-les-Vallons
