= Bernard Morel =

Bernard Morel may refer to:

- Bernard Morel (fencer) (1925–2023)
- Bernard Morel (economist) (1946–2021)
