= Arrondissement of Istres =

Coordinates: 43.52°N 4.98°E

Istres
- Arrondissement
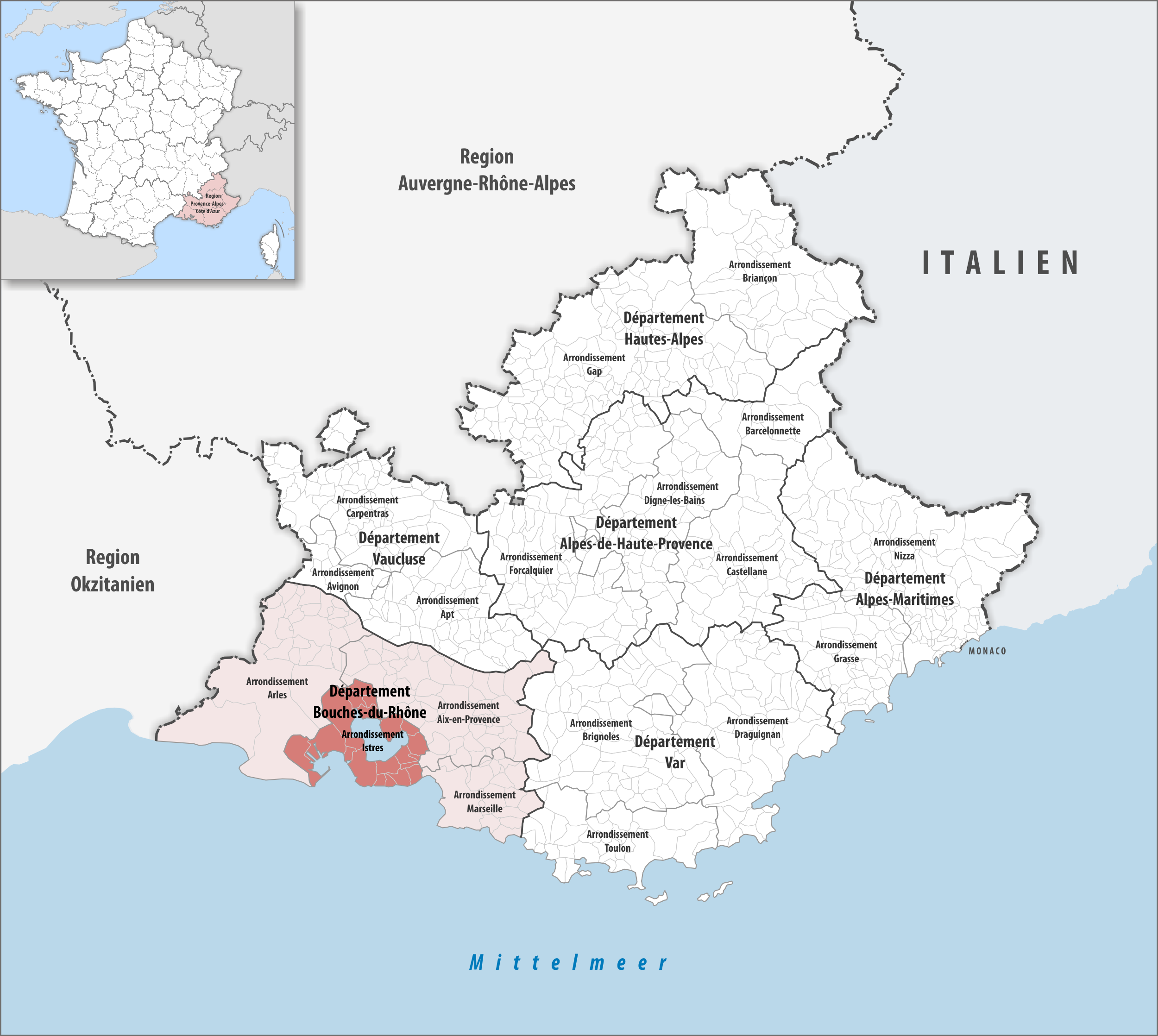
- Location within the region Provence-Alpes-Côte d'Azur
- Country: France
- Region: Provence-Alpes-Côte d'Azur
- Department: Bouches-du-Rhône
- No. of communes: {{{nbcomm}}}
- Area: 715.2 km^{2} (276.1 sq mi)
- Population (2023): 337,702
  - Density: 472.2/km^{2} (1,223/sq mi)
- INSEE code: 134

The arrondissement of Istres is an arrondissement of France in the Bouches-du-Rhône department in the Provence-Alpes-Côte d'Azur region. It has 21 communes. Its population is 334,400 (2021), and its area is 715.2 km^{2} (276.1 sq mi).

== Composition ==
The communes of the arrondissement of Istres, and their INSEE codes, are:

1. Berre-l'Étang (13014)
2. Carry-le-Rouet (13021)
3. Châteauneuf-les-Martigues (13026)
4. Cornillon-Confoux (13029)
5. Ensuès-la-Redonne (13033)
6. Fos-sur-Mer (13039)
7. Gignac-la-Nerthe (13043)
8. Grans (13044)
9. Istres (13047)
10. Marignane (13054)
11. Martigues (13056)
12. Miramas (13063)
13. Port-de-Bouc (13077)
14. Port-Saint-Louis-du-Rhône (13078)
15. Rognac (13081)
16. Le Rove (13088)
17. Saint-Chamas (13092)
18. Saint-Mitre-les-Remparts (13098)
19. Saint-Victoret (13102)
20. Sausset-les-Pins (13104)
21. Vitrolles (13117)

== History ==
The arrondissement of Istres was created in 1981. At the March 2017 reorganization of the arrondissements of Bouches-du-Rhône, it gained one commune from the arrondissement of Arles and two communes from the arrondissement of Aix-en-Provence.

As a result of the reorganisation of the cantons of France which came into effect in 2015, the borders of the cantons are no longer related to the borders of the arrondissements. The cantons of the arrondissement of Istres were, as of January 2015:

1. Berre-l'Étang
2. Châteauneuf-Côte-Bleue
3. Istres-Nord
4. Istres-Sud
5. Marignane
6. Martigues-Est
7. Martigues-Ouest
8. Vitrolles
