= La Couronne, Bouches-du-Rhône =

Village in France

Coordinates: 43°20′11″N 5°3′8″E

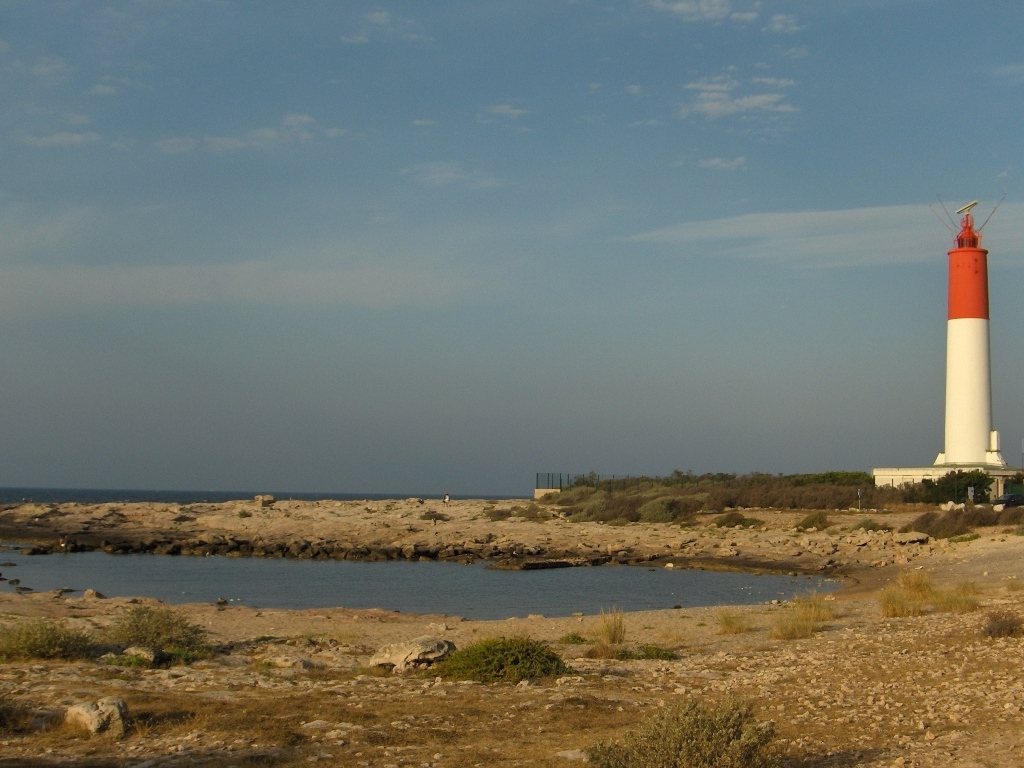
The lighthouse at Cap Couronne

La Couronne (French pronunciation: [la kuʁɔn]) is a village in the south of France on the Côte Bleue on the Mediterranean coast, notable for its ancient quarries and lighthouses.

== Description ==
La Couronne, formerly known as Queyroun, is a village in the commune of Martigues in the Bouches-du-Rhône département in the south of France. It is situated on the Côte Bleue on the Mediterranean coast. Primarily a bathing resort, on the small coastal railway line connecting Martigues and Marseille, it is also known for the ancient quarries and lighthouses on nearby Cap Couronne.

Cap Couronne was well known to seafarers in antiquity as the most extreme promontory between the Bay of Marseille and the Bay of Fos-sur-Mer. The first staffed square lighthouse, 11.6 m high, was constructed in 1867 and dismantled in 1963, following the construction of an automated circular lighthouse, 33 m high, in 1959.

The stone quarries were already mentioned by the Greek historian Strabo; their remains can now be seen on the shoreline, due to rises in the sea level. Archaeological excavations of an Iron Age village suggest that quarrying began in the sixth century BC. The molasse stone was used in Hellenistic Massalia for both the quays and the ramparts.

== Gallery ==
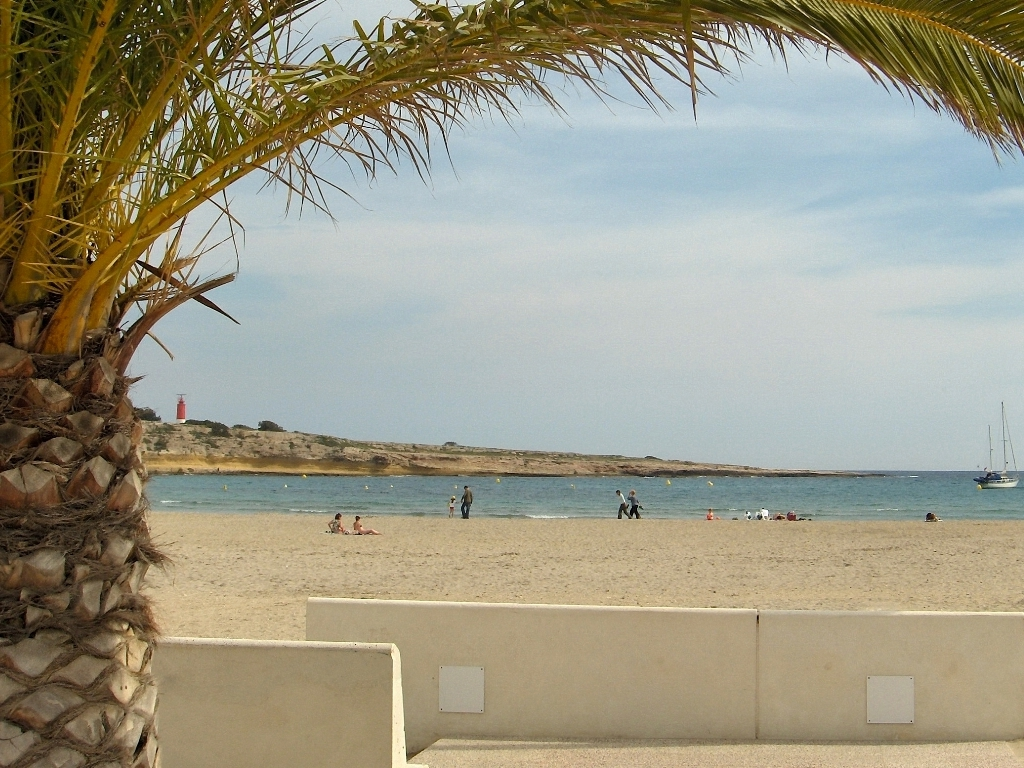
The beach of Le Verdon

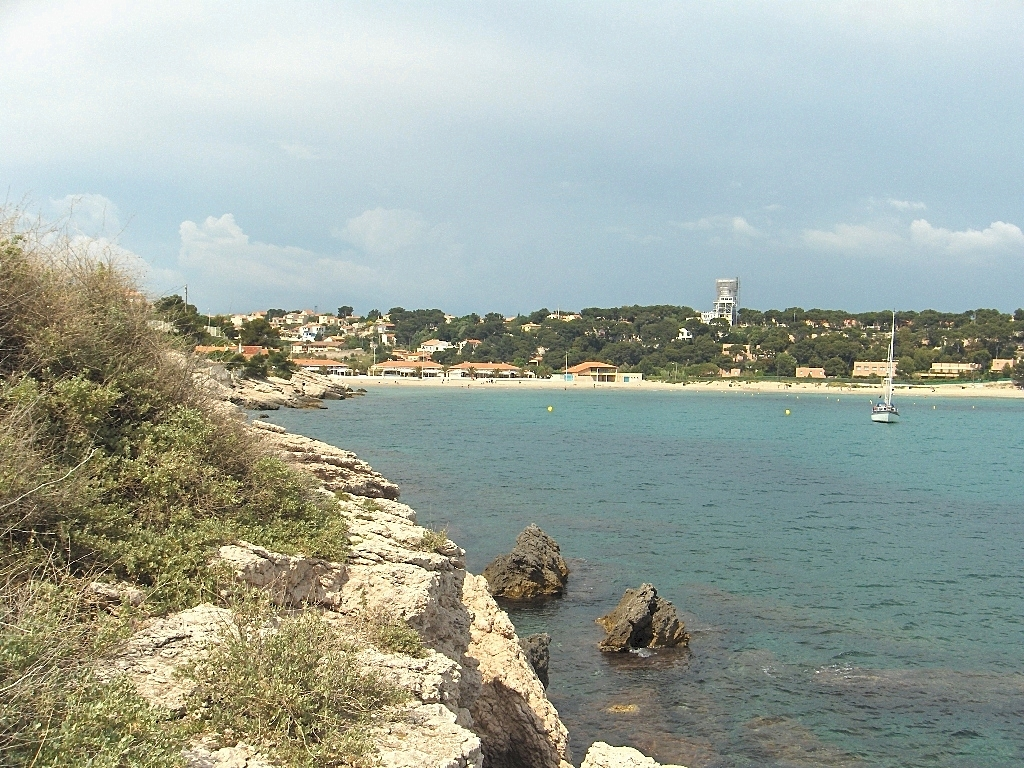
Overview of the beach of Le Verdon

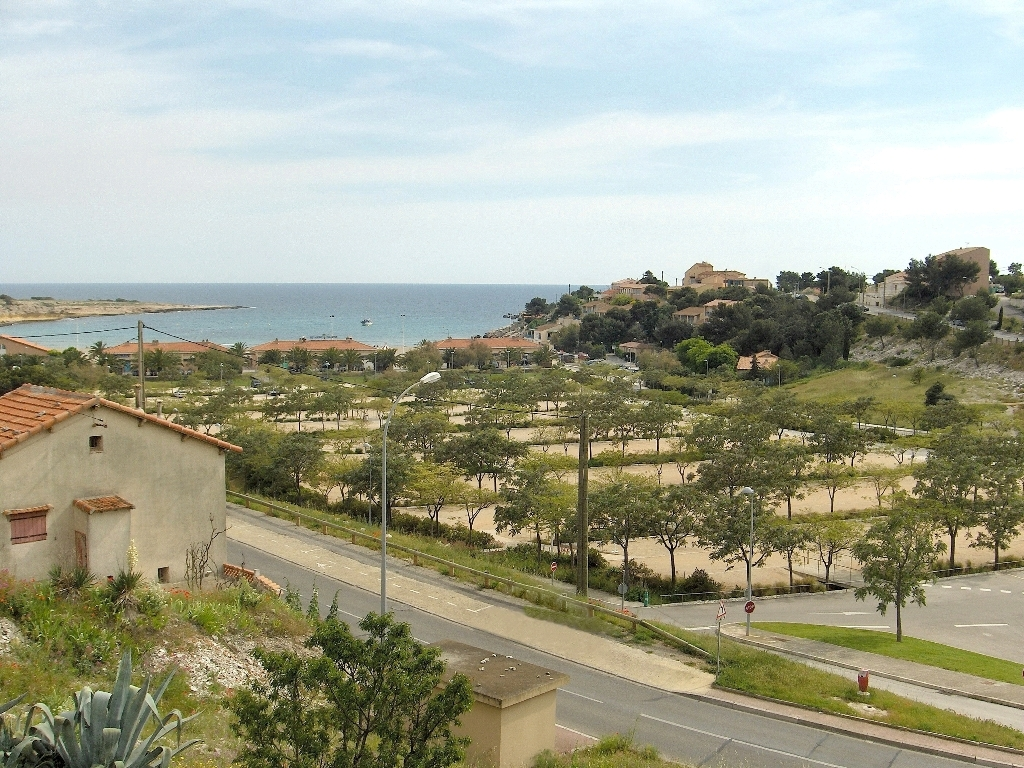
Overview of the beach of Le Verdon from the village

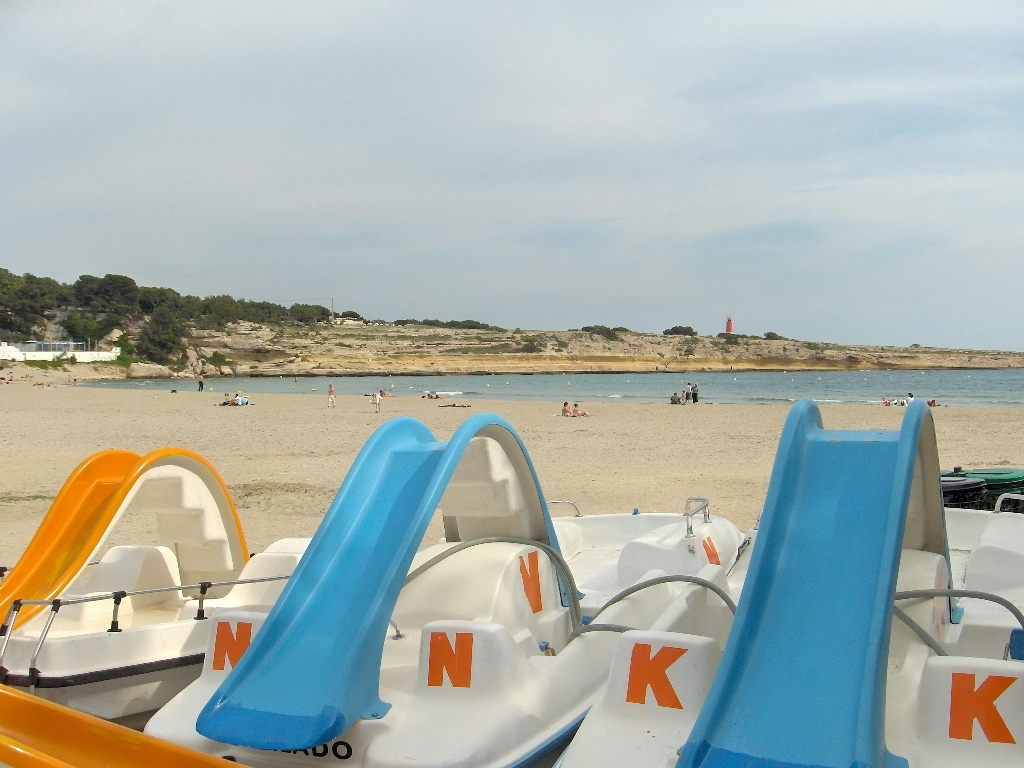
Beach of Verdon on the west

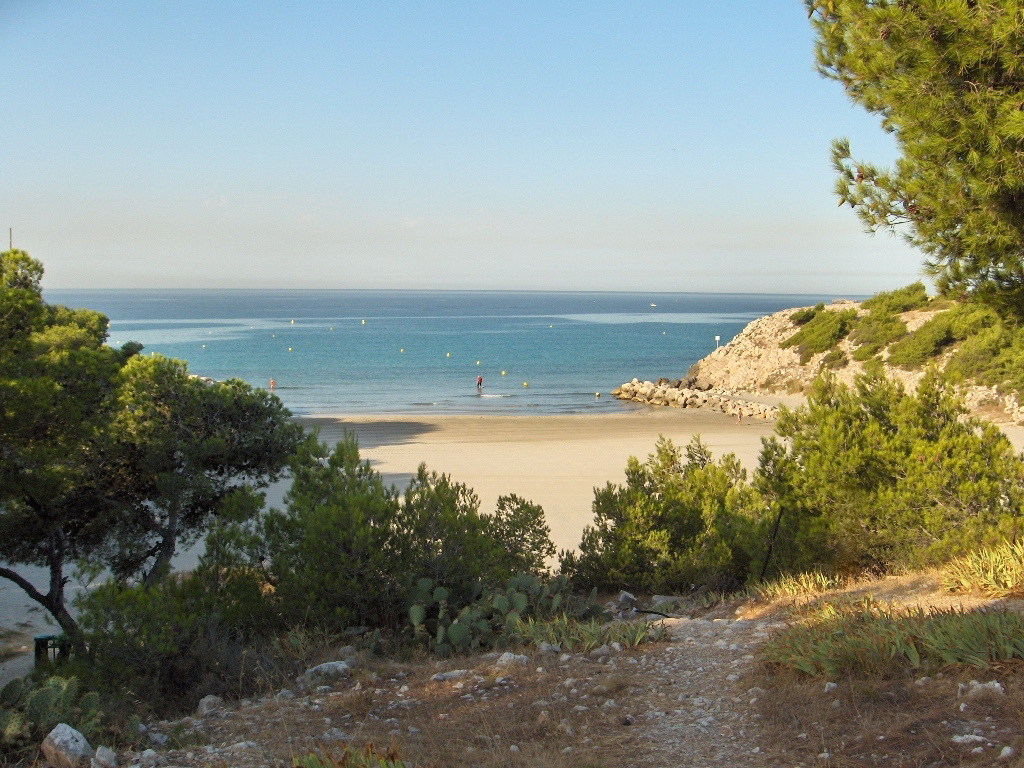
Beach of La Saulce

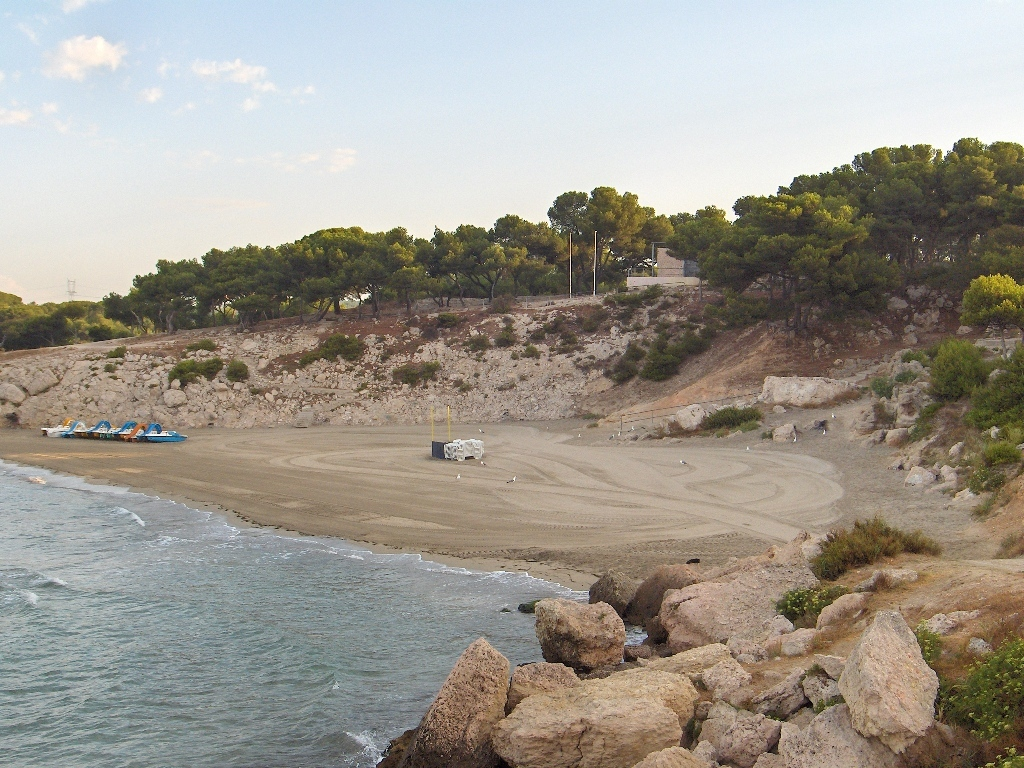
Beach of Sainte-Croix

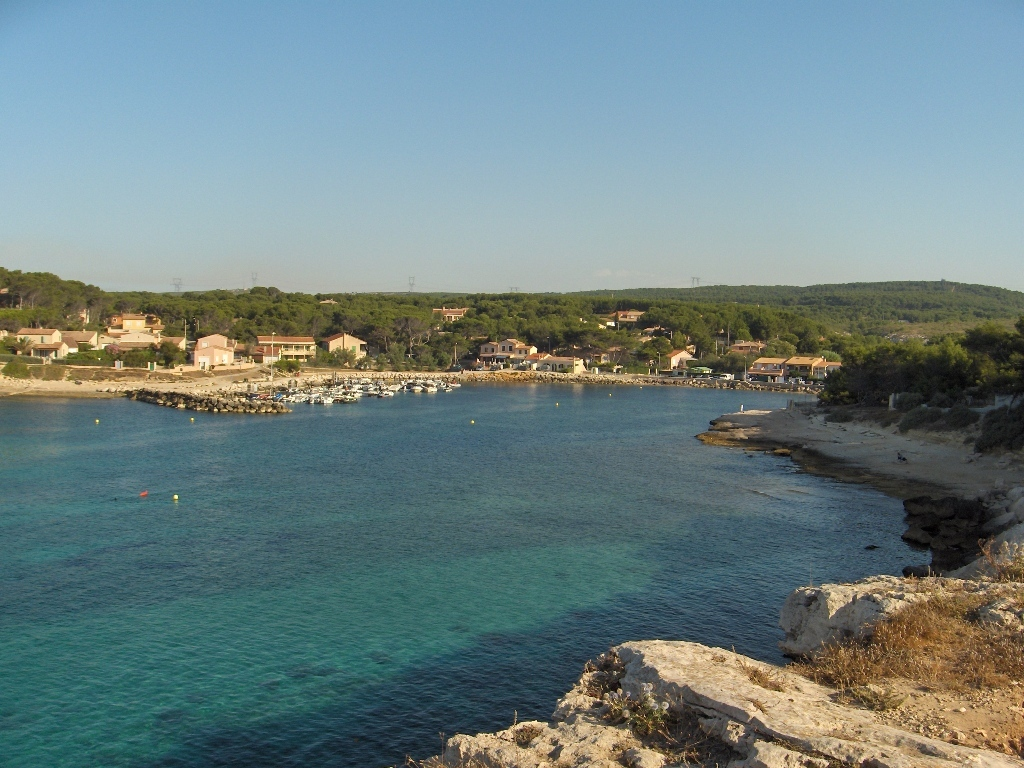
Tamaris harbour
