= Notre-Dame de la Galline =

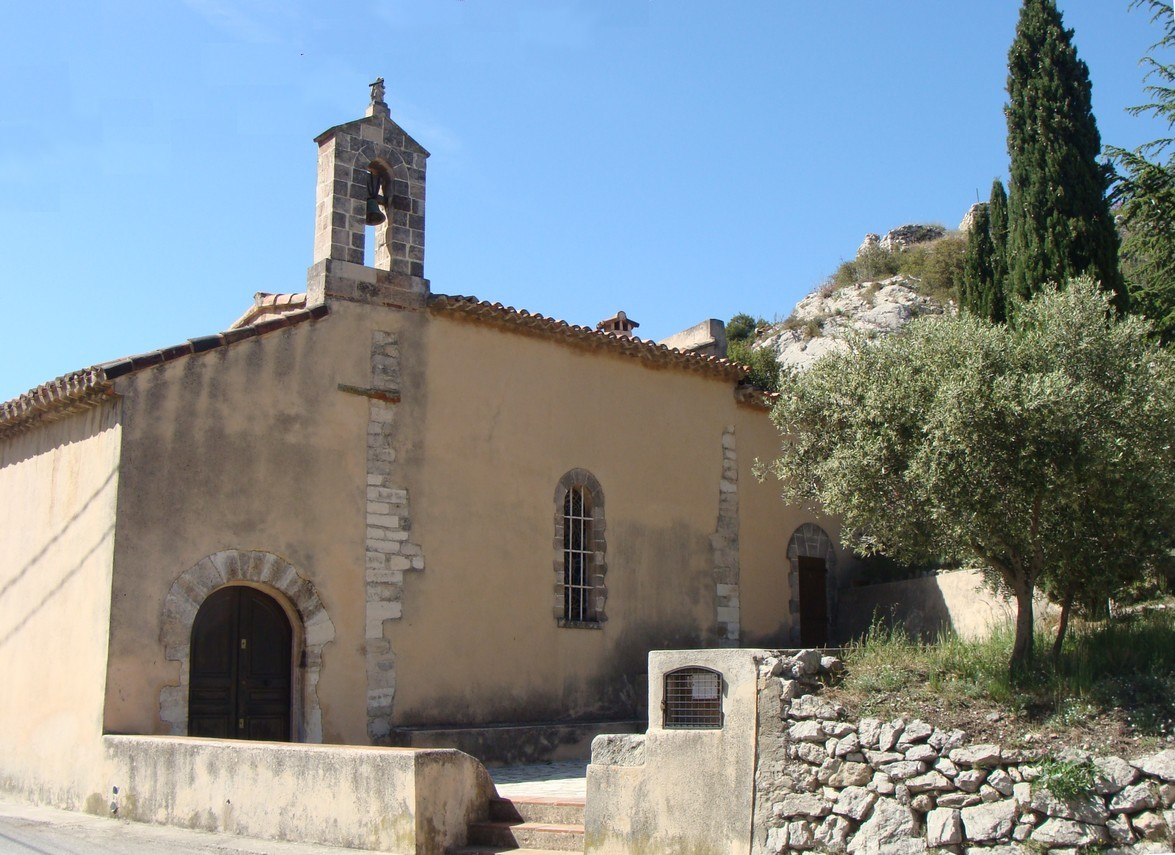
- Notre-Dame de la Galline
- 43°22′42″N 5°17′45″E
- Location: Chemin vicinal de l'Estaque au Rove; Marseille 13001; Bouches-du-Rhône, Provence-Alpes-Côte d'Azur
- Country: France
- Denomination: Roman Catholic

Administration
- Diocese: Roman Catholic Archdiocese of Marseille

Notre-Dame de la Galline is a historic Roman Catholic chapel in the 16th arrondissement of Marseille, France. An ancient church was built in the 4th century, and subsequently rededicated in 1042. By the 18th century, the entrance of the current building was erected, and the church building was rebuilt in 1845–1850, when a Mass was conducted. Church-goers visited the church to pray for the rain to come down, or for the end of the plague. Meanwhile, the bell turret was built in the 1870s. The whole building was restored in the 1980s.

== See also ==
- Catholic Church in France
