= Bernard Morel (economist) =

French economist and politician (1946–2021)

Vice-President of the Regional Council of Provence-Alpes-Côte d'Azur
- In office 13 July 2012 – 11 November 2021

Member of the Regional Council of Provence-Alpes-Côte d'Azur
- In office 21 March 2010 – 11 November 2021

Vice-President of the Urban Community of Marseille Provence Métropole
- In office 2008–2014

Personal details
- Born: 27 March 1946 Bihorel, France
- Died: 11 November 2021 (aged 75)
- Party: PSU; PS
- Occupation: Economist

Bernard Morel (27 March 1946 – 11 November 2021) was a French economist and politician. He was a professor emeritus of economics at the University of Provence and wrote numerous publications on the subject. A member of the Socialist Party, he served as Vice-President of the Regional Council of Provence-Alpes-Côte d'Azur from 2012 until his death in 2021.

== Biography ==
Economist, Bernard Morel holds a doctorate in economic sciences. His work initially focused on economic and social forecasting, and more specifically on the relationship between long-term forecasts and short-term forecasts. This was the subject of his thesis, defended in 1977 and supervised by Professor Christian Goux, whose collaborator he would become, first at the Laboratoire de conjoncture et prospective in Chaville (Yvelines) and Bandol (Var). Subsequently, his work focused on geographical economics – and more specifically on regional economics – and on regional planning and urban development.

== Awards ==
- Knight of the Ordre des Palmes académiques

== Publications ==
- Évaluation de la qualité de la vie, : prospective de l'agglomération de Rouen (1978)
- L'évolution des attitudes envers le travail (1982)
- Marseille, l'endroit du décor (1985)
- Pour une économie plus humaine (1986)
- Marseille, l'état du futur (1988)
- Le marché des drogues (1994)
- Marseille : naissance d'une métropole (1998)
- L'économie : dynamique de la région Provence-Alpes-Côte d’Azur (2002)
- Les hommes : dynamique de la région Provence-Alpes-Côte d’Azur (2002)
- Du savon à la puce : l'industrie marseillaise du xviie siècle à nos jours (2003)
- Le socialisme : l’idée s’est-elle arrêtée en chemin (2008)
