= Gignac-la-Nerthe =

Commune in Provence-Alpes-Côte d'Azur, France

Gignac-La Nerthe
- Commune
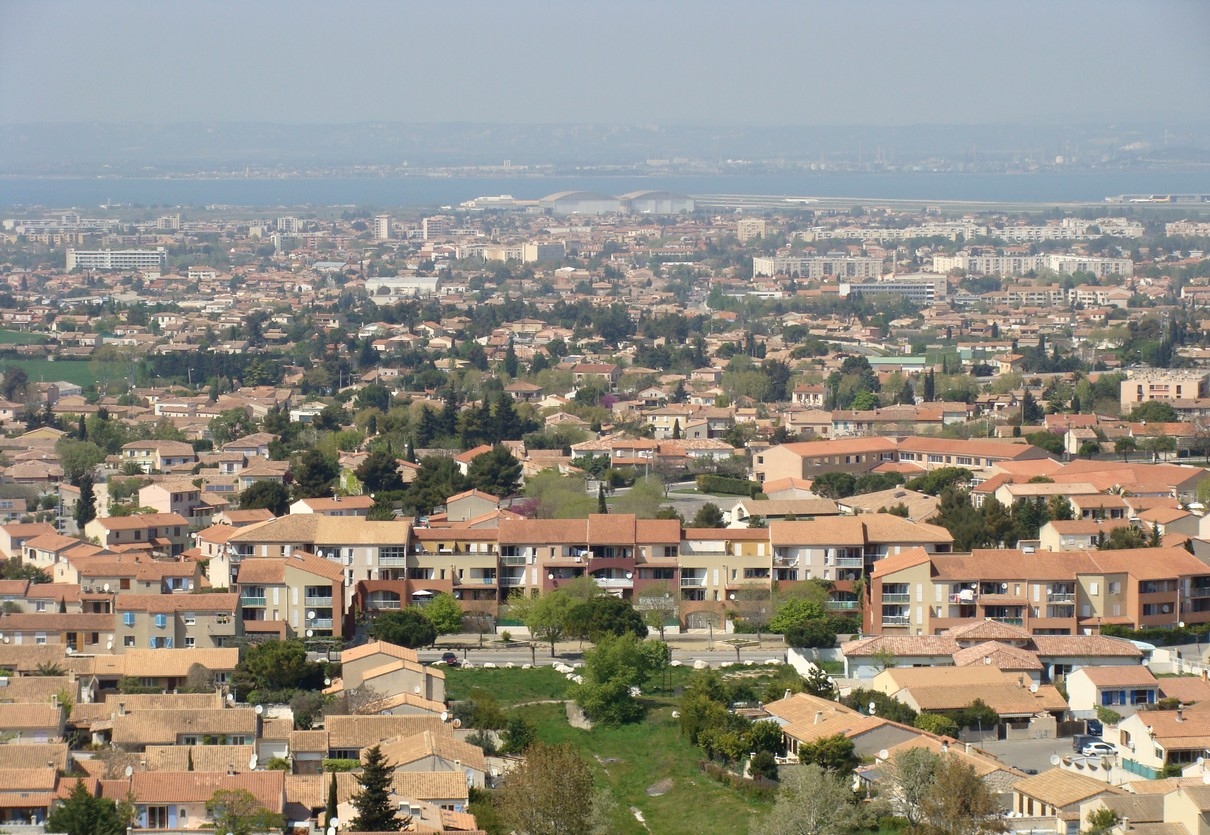
- The Laure District of Gignac-la-Nerthe, with Marignane and the Étang de Berre, seen from the hill of Saint-Michel

- Coat of arms
- Location of Gignac-La Nerthe
- Location within France Location within Provence-Alpes-Côte d'Azur
- Coordinates: 43°23′35″N 5°14′08″E
- Country: France
- Region: Provence-Alpes-Côte d'Azur
- Department: Bouches-du-Rhône
- Arrondissement: Istres
- Canton: Marignane
- Intercommunality: Aix-Marseille-Provence Metropolis

Government
  - Mayor (2026–32): Jerome Gouiran
- Area^{1}: 8.64 km^{2} (3.34 sq mi)
- Highest elevation: 128 m (420 ft)
- Lowest elevation: 11 m (36 ft)
- Population (2023): 10,343
  - Density: 1,200/km^{2} (3,100/sq mi)
- Time zone: UTC+01:00 (CET)
  - Summer (DST): UTC+02:00 (CEST)
- INSEE/Postal code: 13043 /13180
- ^{1} French Land Register data, which excludes lakes, ponds, glaciers > 1 km^{2} (0.386 sq mi or 247 acres) and river estuaries.

Gignac-la-Nerthe (French pronunciation: [ʒiɲak la nɛʁt]; Occitan: Ginhac) is a commune in the Bouches-du-Rhône department in southern France. It is located about 10 km north-north-west of Marseille and is primarily a residential community.

== History ==
During Antiquity, what is now Gignac hosted a Roman villa.

In the 13th century, the Knights Templar built the Saint-Michel de Gignac castle. After the Middle Age, agriculture developed (wheat, olive, vineries,...). The church of Gignac was built in 1780. At that time, Gignac was part of the Marignane seigneurie.

The commune was created during the French Revolution. At first, it included Le Rove, which separated in 1835. In 1919, the commune changed its name from Gignac to Gignac-la-Nerthe to differentiate from other towns with the same name.

In the 19th century, many migrants from Spain and Italy came to live in the area, but the town only started to grow in the 1960s with the arrival of Pieds-Noirs from Algeria.

== Geography and population ==
Gignac-la-Nerthe is situated just north of the Estaque hills and south of the Étang de Berre.

Historical population

Year	Pop.	±% p.a.
1793	553	—
1800	578	+0.63%
1806	1,037	+10.23%
1821	1,378	+1.91%
1831	1,509	+0.91%
1836	706	−14.09%
1841	731	+0.70%
1846	810	+2.07%
1851	876	+1.58%
1856	909	+0.74%
1861	956	+1.01%
1866	908	−1.02%
1872	928	+0.36%
1876	887	−1.12%
1881	863	−0.55%
1886	915	+1.18%
1891	940	+0.54%
1896	938	−0.04%
1901	946	+0.17%

Year	Pop.	±% p.a.
1906	991	+0.93%
1911	987	−0.08%
1921	1,314	+2.90%
1926	1,270	−0.68%
1931	1,240	−0.48%
1936	1,364	+1.92%
1946	1,527	+1.14%
1954	1,687	+1.25%
1962	1,963	+1.91%
1968	2,666	+5.23%
1975	3,568	+4.25%
1982	4,361	+2.91%
1990	8,772	+9.13%
1999	9,189	+0.52%
2007	9,245	+0.08%
2012	9,070	−0.38%
2017	9,326	+0.56%
2023	10,343	+1.74%

Source: EHESS and INSEE (1968-2023)

== See also ==
- Communes of the Bouches-du-Rhône department
