= Ensuès-la-Redonne =

Commune in Provence-Alpes-Côte d'Azur, France

Ensuès-La Redonne En Suá la Redona (Occitan)
- Commune
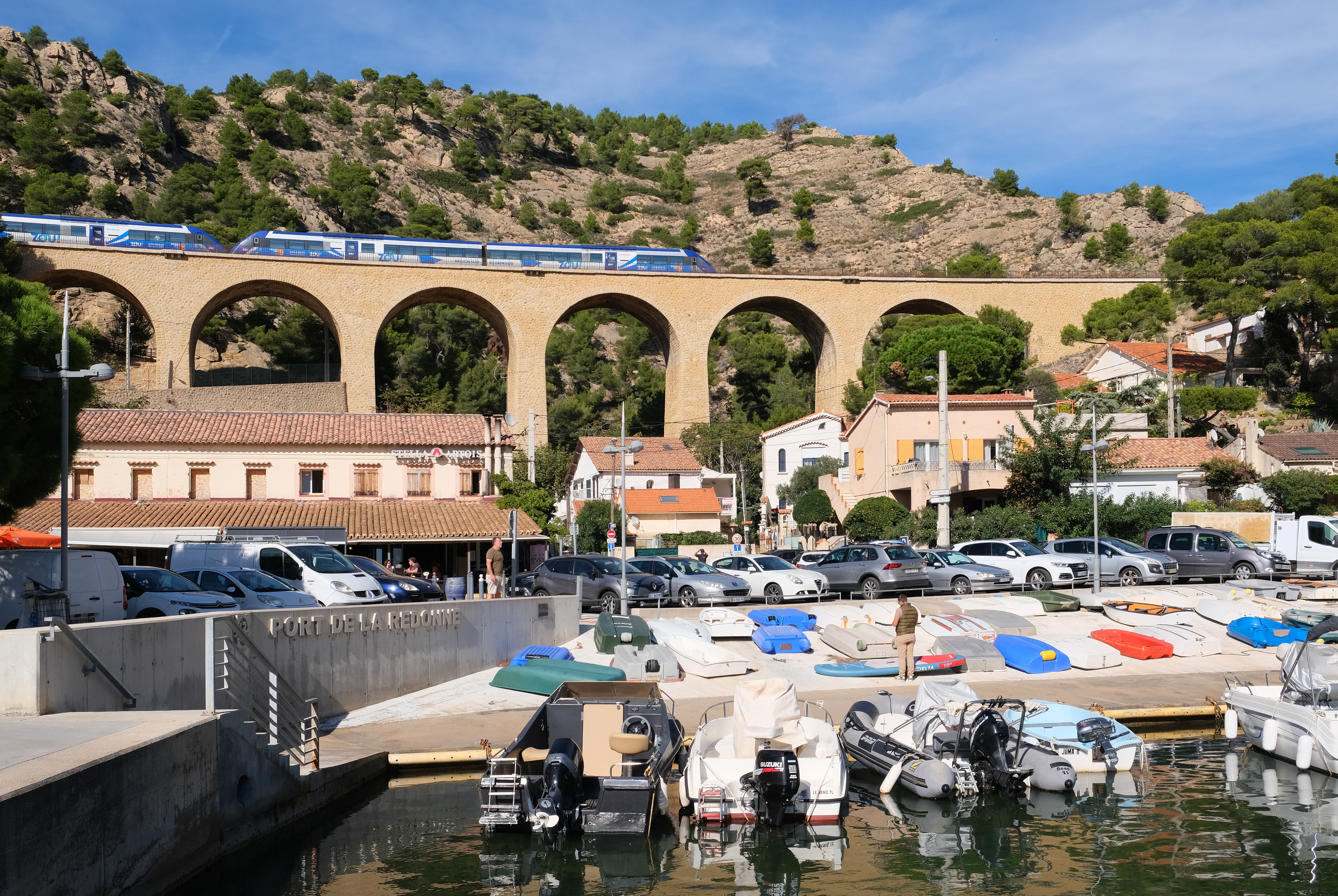
- A view of La Redonne with the Viaduc d'Ensuès-la-Redonne on the Miramas–L'Estaque railway

- Coat of arms
- Location of Ensuès-La Redonne
- Location within France Location within Provence-Alpes-Côte d'Azur
- Coordinates: 43°21′21″N 5°12′15″E
- Country: France
- Region: Provence-Alpes-Côte d'Azur
- Department: Bouches-du-Rhône
- Arrondissement: Istres
- Canton: Marignane
- Intercommunality: Aix-Marseille-Provence

Government
  - Mayor (2026–32): Michel Illac
- Area^{1}: 25.83 km^{2} (9.97 sq mi)
- Highest elevation: 238 m (781 ft)
- Lowest elevation: 0 m (0 ft)
- Population (2023): 5,757
  - Density: 222.9/km^{2} (577.3/sq mi)
- Time zone: UTC+01:00 (CET)
  - Summer (DST): UTC+02:00 (CEST)
- INSEE/Postal code: 13033 /13820
- ^{1} French Land Register data, which excludes lakes, ponds, glaciers > 1 km^{2} (0.386 sq mi or 247 acres) and river estuaries.

Ensuès-la-Redonne (French pronunciation: [ɑ̃sɥɛs la ʁədɔn]; Occitan: En Suá la Redona) is a seaside commune in the Bouches-du-Rhône department in the Provence-Alpes-Côte-d'Azur region in Southern France. It is located on the Côte Bleue, 15 km (9.3 mi) west of Marseille, within the larger Aix-Marseille-Provence Metropolis.

The commune was created in 1933 from parts of Châteauneuf-les-Martigues and Le Rove.

== Transport ==
Ensuès-la-Redonne is served by the La Redonne-Ensuès TER PACA railway station (opened in 1915) on the Miramas–L'Estaque railway.

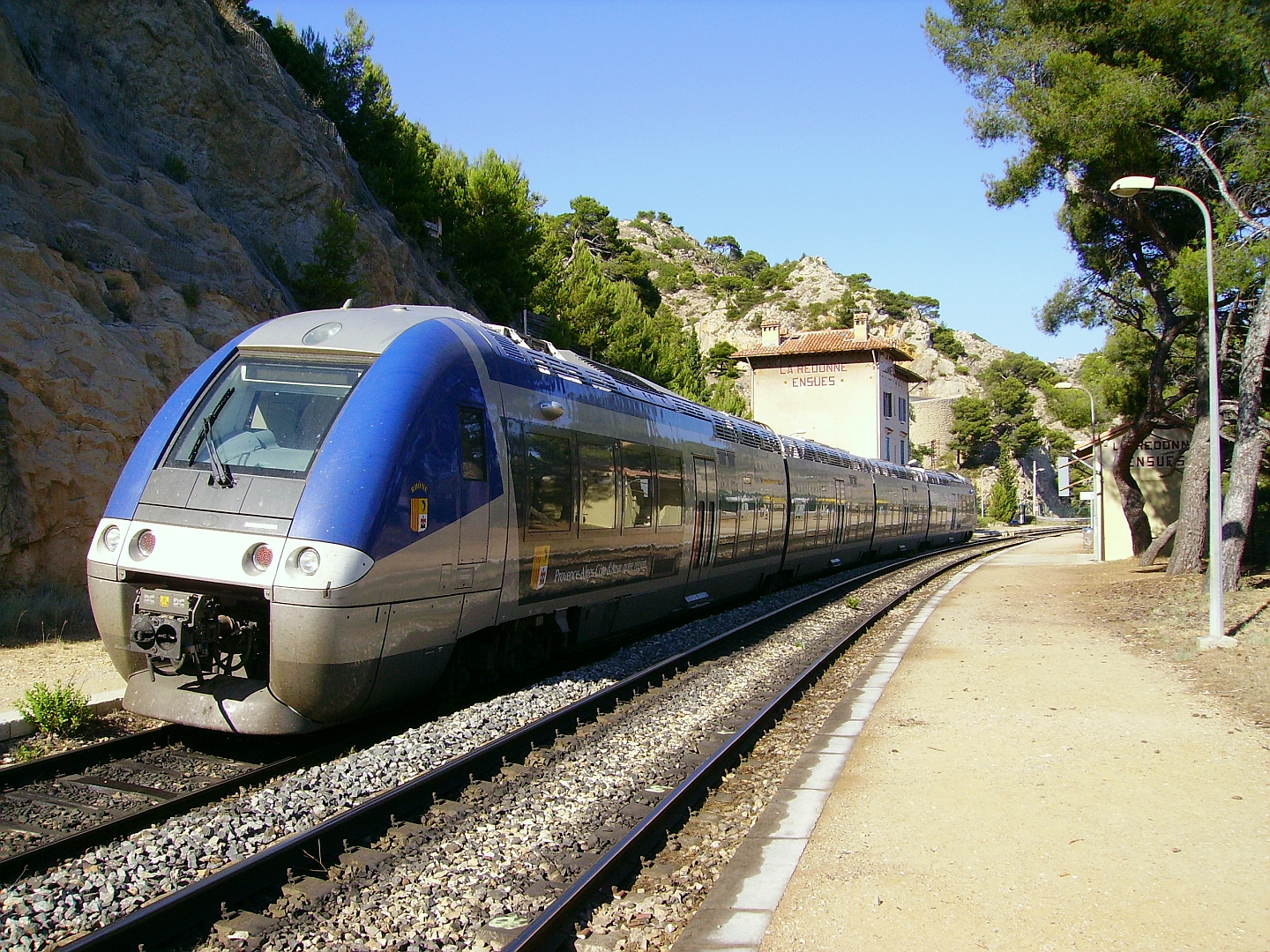
TER PACA service at La Redonne-Ensuès station in 2010

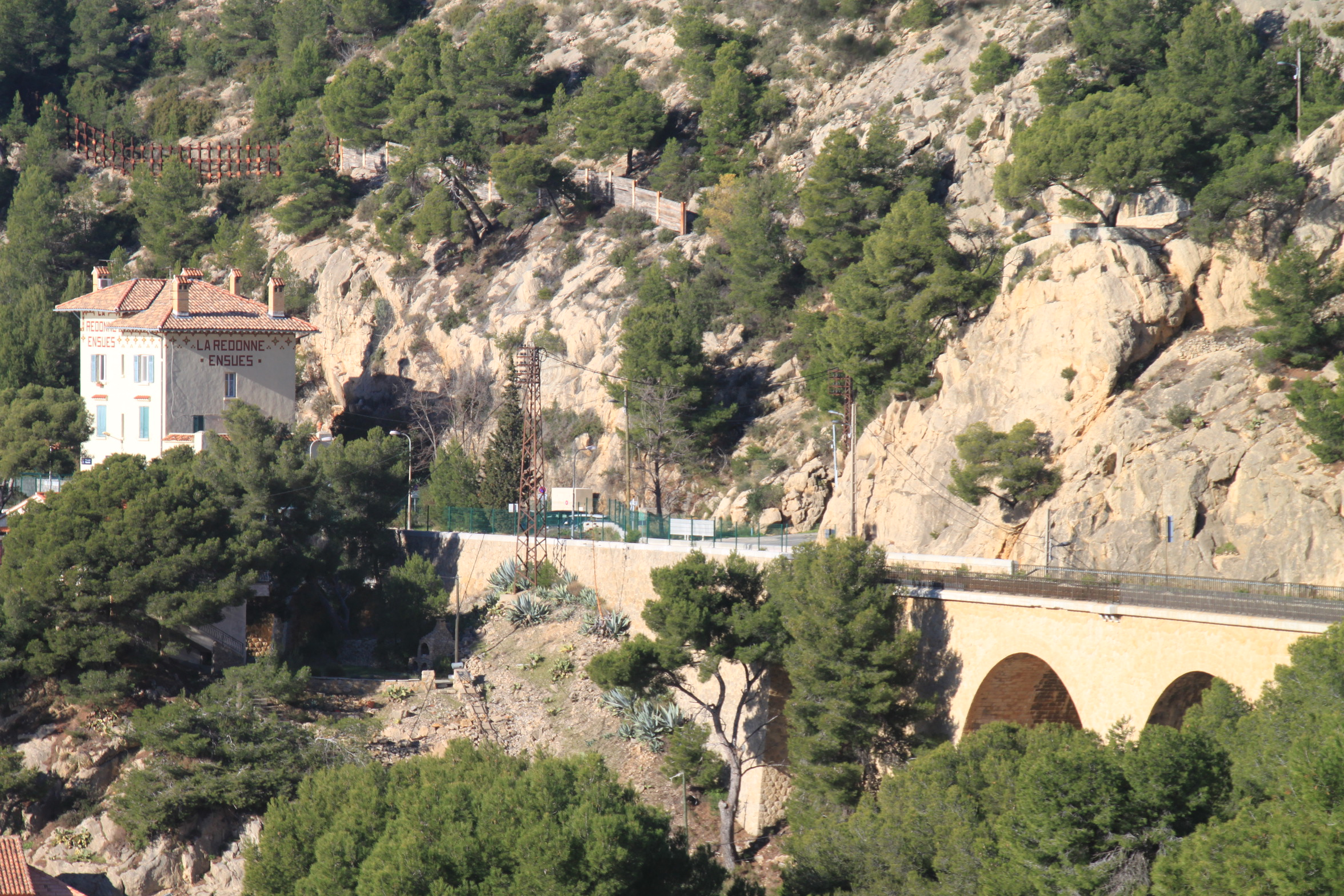
Station building

== Demographics ==
Historical population

Year	Pop.	±% p.a.
1936	503	—
1946	436	−1.42%
1954	704	+6.17%
1962	1,041	+5.01%
1968	1,192	+2.28%
1975	1,699	+5.19%
1982	2,204	+3.79%

Year	Pop.	±% p.a.
1990	3,029	+4.05%
1999	4,547	+4.62%
2007	5,166	+1.61%
2012	5,311	+0.56%
2017	5,484	+0.64%
2023	5,757	+0.81%

Source: EHESS and INSEE (1968–2023)

== See also ==
- Communes of the Bouches-du-Rhône department
