= Côte Bleue =

Mediterranean coast west of Marseille in Southern France

Coordinates: 43.333°N 5.189°E

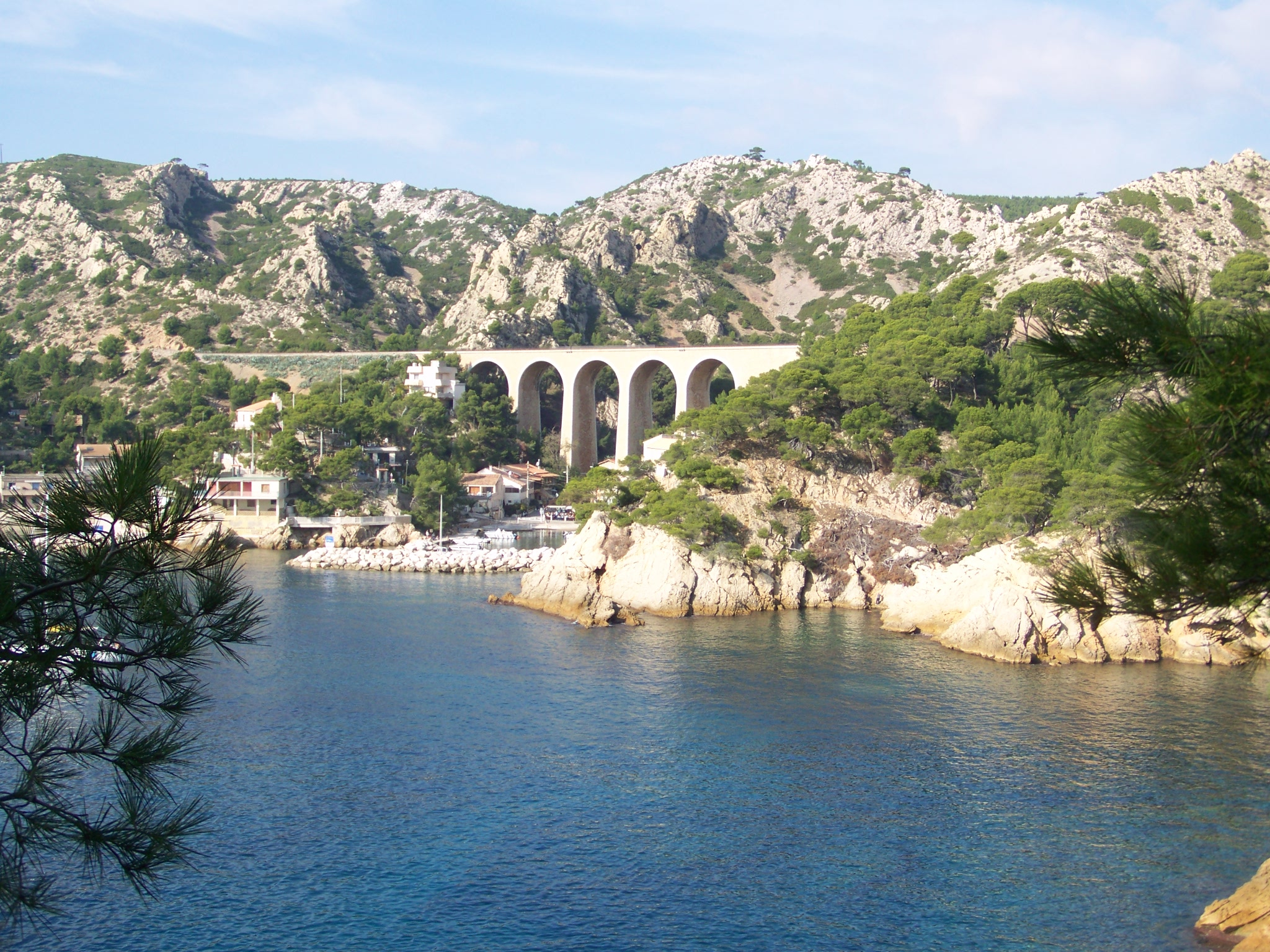
A view of the Viaduc de Méjean on the Miramas–L'Estaque railway in the commune of Ensuès-la-Redonne

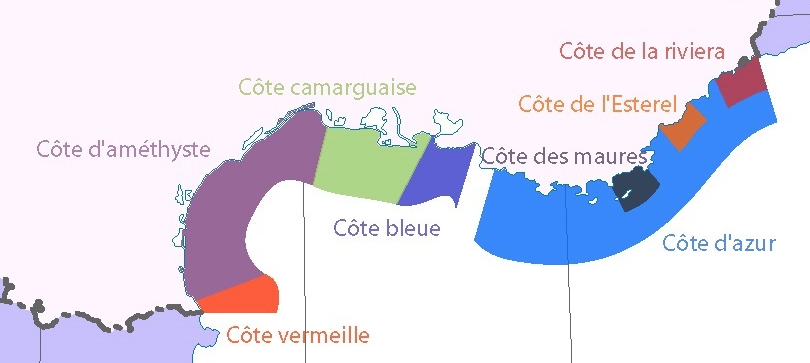
Location of the Côte Bleue (navy blue) in the South of France

The Côte Bleue (French pronunciation: [kot blø]; lit. 'Blue Coast'; Provençal Occitan: Còsta Blava) is part of Provence's southwestern coast on the Mediterranean Sea, reaching from northern Marseille in the east to the early Rhône river delta in the west, which constitutes the eastern part of the Camargue natural region, west of the Étang de Berre. It is wholly within the Bouches-du-Rhône department in Southern France.

== Transport ==
The Côte Bleue is served by the SNCF railway running from Miramas to the L'Estaque neighbourhood in northern Marseille, through the seaside communes of Sausset-les-Pins, Carry-le-Rouet, Ensuès-la-Redonne and Le Rove. Opened in phases between 1879 and 1915, it has been named one of the most scenic railway lines in the world. It is colloquially known in French as Le train de la côte Bleue ("The train of the Blue Coast").
