= 16th arrondissement of Marseille =

- Municipal arrondissement
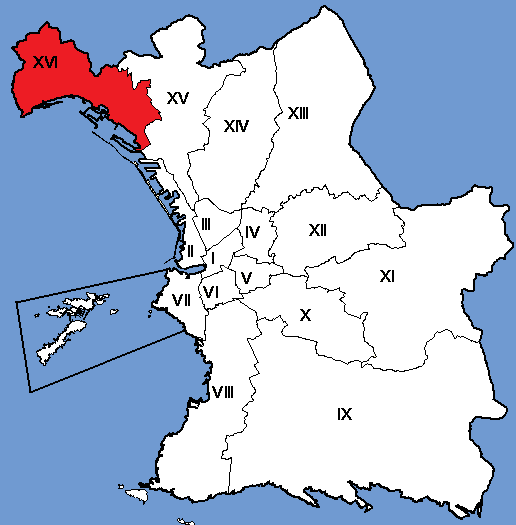
- Location within Marseille
- Interactive map of 16th arrondissement of Marseille
- Coordinates: 43.3753°N 5.3050°E
- Country: France
- Region: Provence-Alpes-Côte d'Azur
- Department: Bouches-du-Rhône
- Commune: Marseille

Government
  - Mayor (2020–2026): Nadia Boulainseur (DVG)
- Area: 16.30 km^{2} (6.29 sq mi)
- Population (2023): 15,854
  - Density: 972.6/km^{2} (2,519/sq mi)
- INSEE code: 13216

The 16th arrondissement of Marseille is one of the 16 arrondissements of Marseille. It covers the nothwestern part of the city. It is governed locally together with the 15th arrondissement, with which it forms the 8th sector of Marseille.

== Population ==
Historical population
Year	Pop.	±% p.a.
1968	24,281	—
1975	20,619	−2.31%
1982	18,791	−1.32%
1990	17,243	−1.07%
1999	16,574	−0.44%
2007	17,630	+0.78%
2012	17,101	−0.61%
2017	16,208	−1.07%
2023	15,854	−0.37%
Source: INSEE

Neighbourhood	Population (2022)
L'Estaque	5,807
Les Riaux	722
Saint-André	3,739
Saint-Henri	5,145

== Notable locations ==
- Notre-Dame de la Galline, 4th century historic Roman Catholic chapel
- Villa La Palestine, historic mansion
