= Château de Marignane =

Town hall in Marignane, France

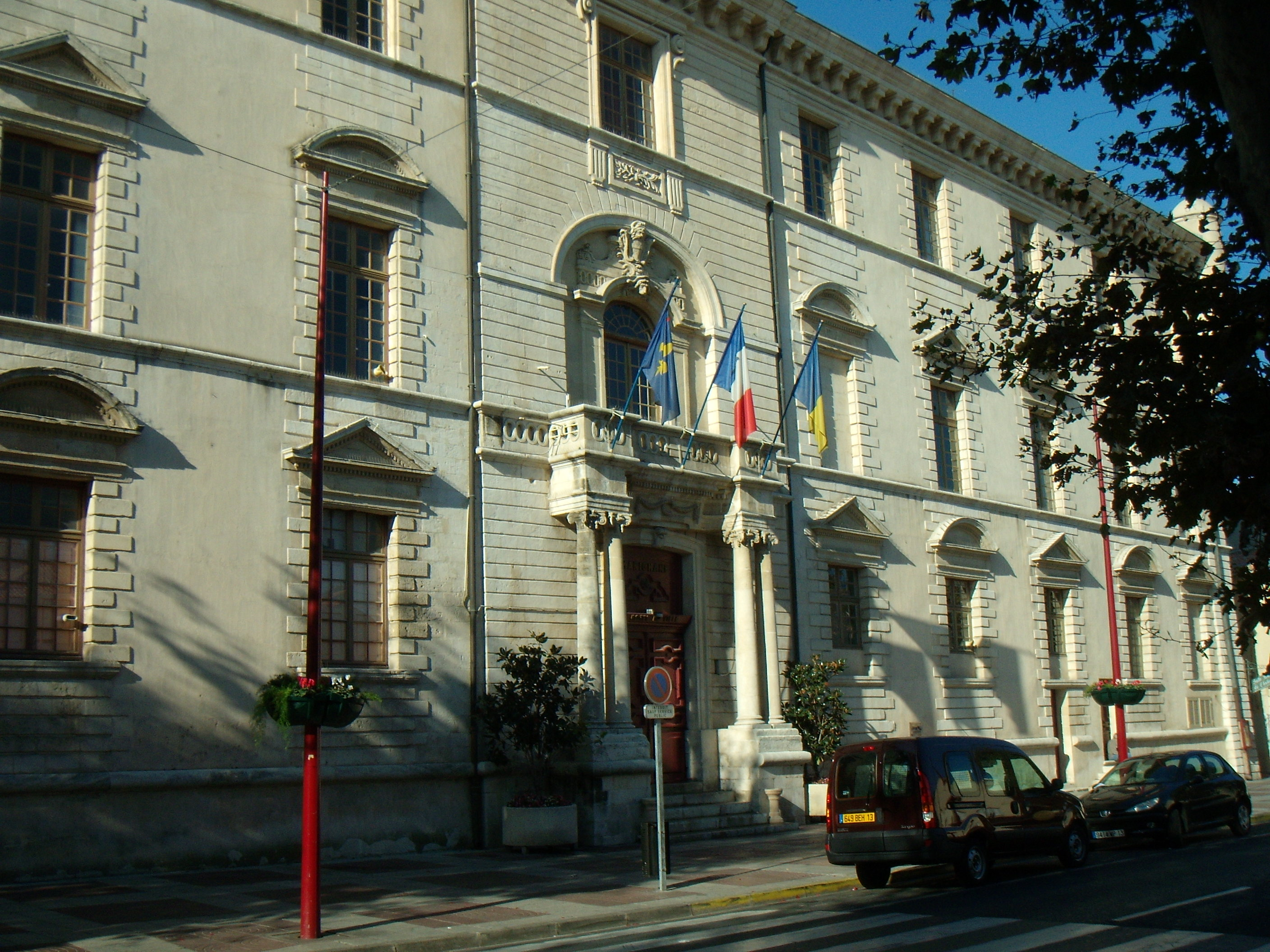
- The main frontage of the Château de Marignane in November 2007

General information
- Type: City hall
- Architectural style: Neoclassical style
- Location: Marignane, France
- Coordinates: 43.4172°N 5.2157°E
- Completed: 1664

Monument historique
- Official name: Ancien château des Covet de Marignane, actuel hôtel de ville
- Type: Inscrit
- Designated: 1996
- Reference no.: PA00081322

The Château de Marignane is a municipal building in Marignane, Bouches-du-Rhône, in southern France, standing on Cours Mirabeau. It was designated a monument historique by the French government in 1996.

== History ==
The first château was commissioned by the Lords de Baux in the mid-14th century. François des Baux sold the château in 1422 and, after changing hands a few times, it was acquired by the governor of Provence, Claude de Savoie in 1540. His wife, Françoise de Foix-Candale, carried out extensive improvements to the building, so much so that King Charles IX visited the castle in 1564 as he sought to reduce tensions during the French Wars of Religion.

Following the death of Françoise de Foix-Candale, the château was acquired by a family of merchants, the Covet family, in 1603. The covet family decided to rebuild the château around a courtyard. Further work to expand the complex with a new main frontage on the east side was completed by the master mason, Laurent Vallon, in 1664. The design involved an asymmetrical main frontage of eight bays facing onto the square. The third bay on the left featured a porch formed by two pairs of Ionic order columns supporting an entablature. There was a recessed round headed French door with voussoirs and a balcony on the first floor, and a casement window with a cornice on the second floor. The other bays were fenestrated with casement windows with alternating triangular and segmental pediments on the first two floors, and by plain casement windows on the second floor. Internally, the principal rooms were decorated with fine paintings by the Flemish artist, Jean Daret.

The writer, Marie de Rabutin-Chantal, marquise de Sévigné, visited the château and then wrote a letter to her daughter, Françoise-Marguerite de Sévigné, describing its rich decoration in June 1689. After Émilie de Covet married the statesman, Honoré Gabriel Riqueti, comte de Mirabeau, in 1772, the couple regularly stayed at the château, and their son, Victor, died in infancy there in 1778.

Following the French Revolution, the château was confiscated by the state as biens nationaux (for the good of the state). In 1892, the town council, which had been accommodated in the Beffroi (belfry) in Place Camille Desmoulins since the 16th century, was seeking larger premises and decided to acquire the château. An extensive programme of refurbishment works, involving the conversion of the main bedroom on the first floor into the Salle des Mariages (wedding room), was completed in 1896.
