= Canton of Marignane =

Coordinates: 43.42°N 5.21°E

- Canton
- Situation of the canton of Marignane in the department of Bouches-du-Rhône
- Country: France
- Region: Provence-Alpes-Côte d'Azur
- Department: Bouches-du-Rhône
- No. of communes: {{{nbcomm}}}
- Population (2023): 86,769
- INSEE code: 1311

The canton of Marignane is an administrative division of the Bouches-du-Rhône department, in southeastern France. At the French canton reorganisation which came into effect in March 2015, it was expanded from 2 to 7 communes. Its seat is in Marignane.

It consists of the following communes:

1. Carry-le-Rouet
2. Châteauneuf-les-Martigues
3. Ensuès-la-Redonne
4. Gignac-la-Nerthe
5. Marignane
6. Le Rove
7. Sausset-les-Pins
