= Villa La Palestine =

Historic mansion in Marseille, Bouches-du-Rhône, France

Coordinates: 43.3611°N 5.3126°E

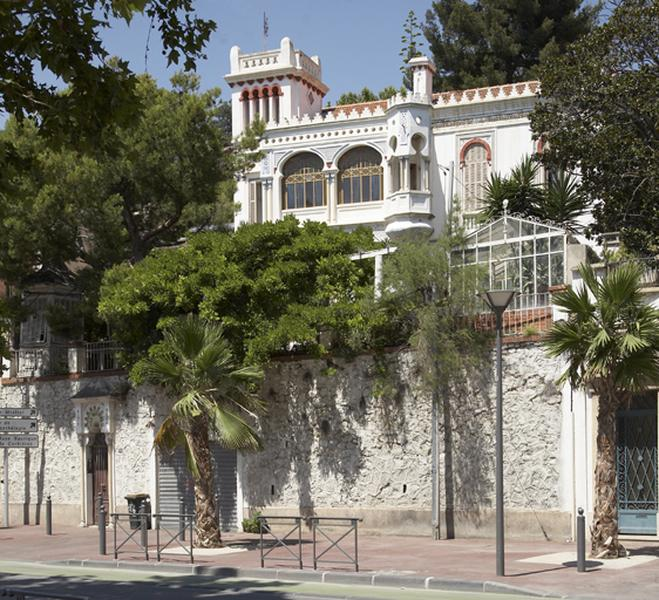
- Interactive map of the Villa La Palestine area

General information
- Type: House
- Location: 126 plage de l'Estaque, Marseille, France
- Construction started: 1902
- Completed: 1905

Villa La Palestine is a historic mansion in Marseille, Bouches-du-Rhône, France. It was built from 1902 to 1905 for Pierre Leclerc. It has been listed as an official historical monument since November 16, 1993.
