= Sausset-les-Pins =

Commune in Provence-Alpes-Côte d'Azur, France

Sausset-les-Pins Sausset dei Pins (Occitan)
- Commune
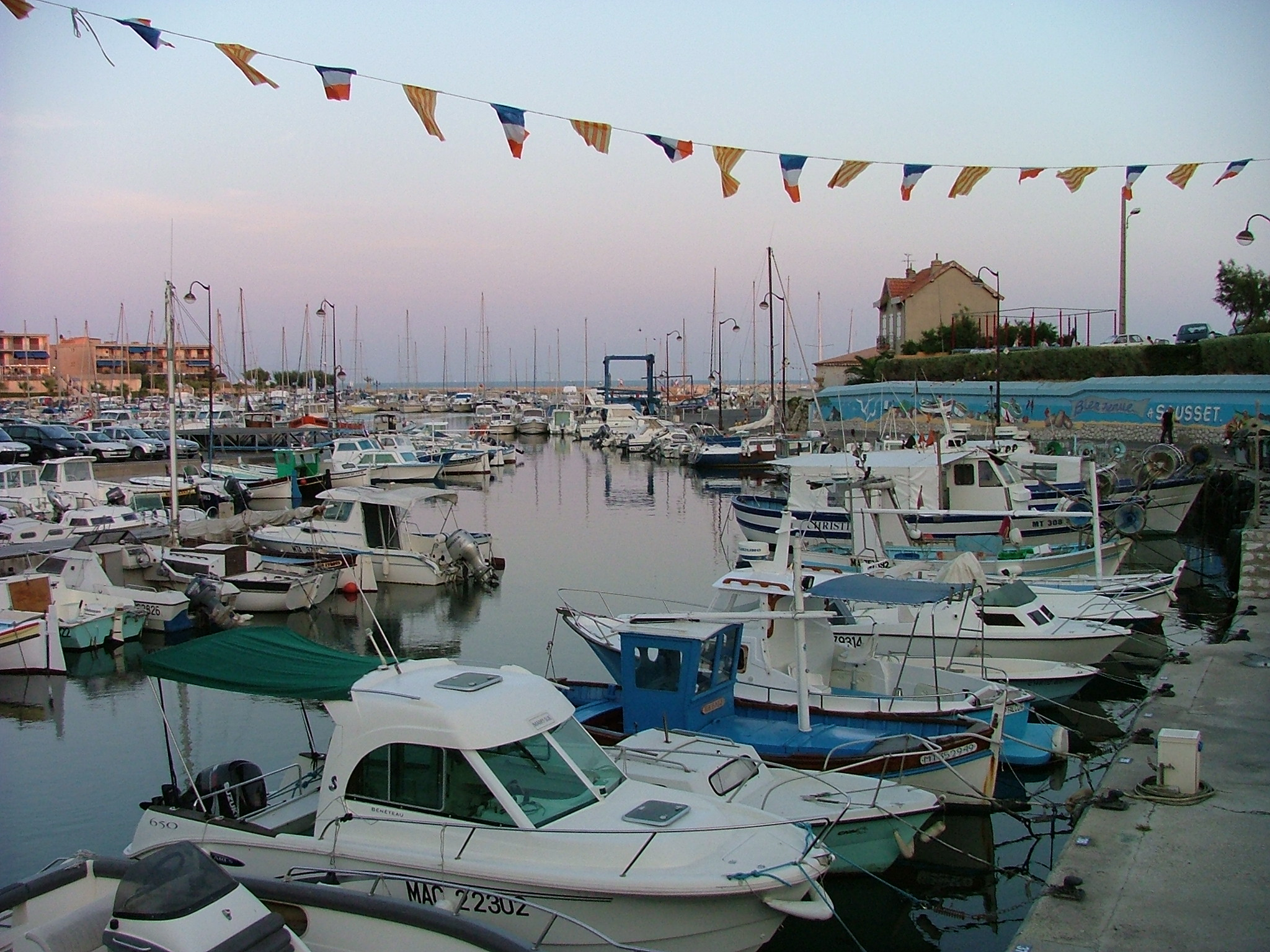
- Sausset-les-Pins marina

- Coat of arms
- Location of Sausset-les-Pins
- Location within France Location within Provence-Alpes-Côte d'Azur
- Coordinates: 43°19′48″N 5°06′53″E
- Country: France
- Region: Provence-Alpes-Côte d'Azur
- Department: Bouches-du-Rhône
- Arrondissement: Istres
- Canton: Marignane
- Intercommunality: Aix-Marseille-Provence

Government
  - Mayor (2026–32): Maxime Marchand
- Area^{1}: 12.1 km^{2} (4.7 sq mi)
- Elevation: 10 m (33 ft)
- Highest elevation: 176 m (577 ft)
- Lowest elevation: 0 m (0 ft)
- Population (2023): 7,574
  - Density: 626/km^{2} (1,620/sq mi)
- Time zone: UTC+01:00 (CET)
  - Summer (DST): UTC+02:00 (CEST)
- INSEE/Postal code: 13104 /13960
- ^{1} French Land Register data, which excludes lakes, ponds, glaciers > 1 km^{2} (0.386 sq mi or 247 acres) and river estuaries.

Sausset-les-Pins (French pronunciation: [sosɛ le pɛ̃]; lit. 'Sausset-the-Pines'; Occitan: Sausset dei Pins) or simply Sausset is a seaside commune in the Bouches-du-Rhône department in the Provence-Alpes-Côte d'Azur region in Southern France. It is located on the Côte Bleue, just west of Carry-le-Rouet. It is part of the Aix-Marseille-Provence Metropolis.

== Geography ==
Sausset-les-Pins located 35 km (21.7 mi) west of Marseille and 42 km (26 mi) southwest of Aix-en-Provence. The commune covers an area of 12.1 km^{2} (4.7 sq mi).

== History ==
In 1855 a castle was built. In 1924 the commune of Sausset-les-Pins was created from part of the commune of Carry-le-Rouet.

In 1915, the Sausset-les-Pins TER PACA railway station opened on the Miramas–L'Estaque railway.

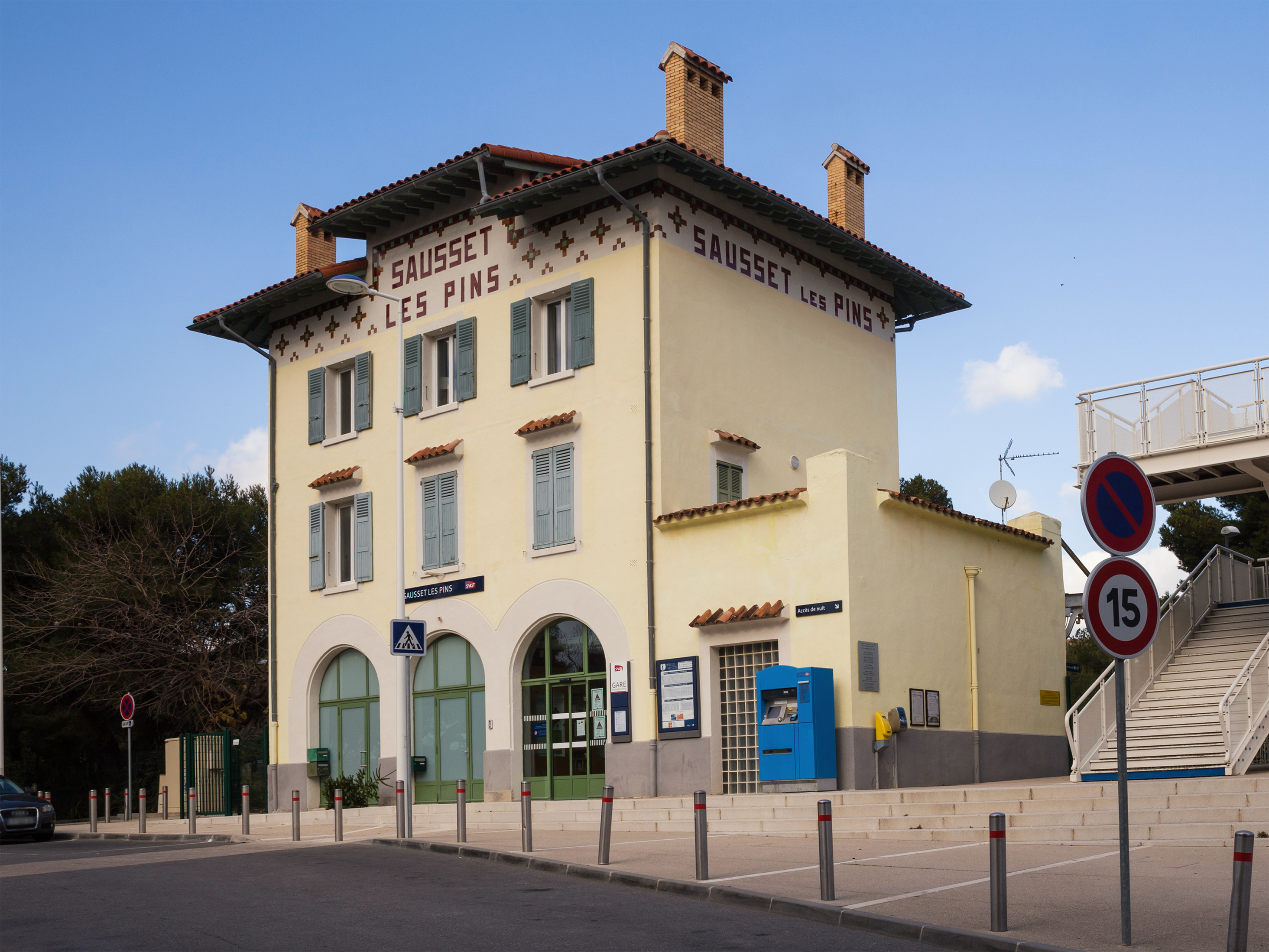
Station building

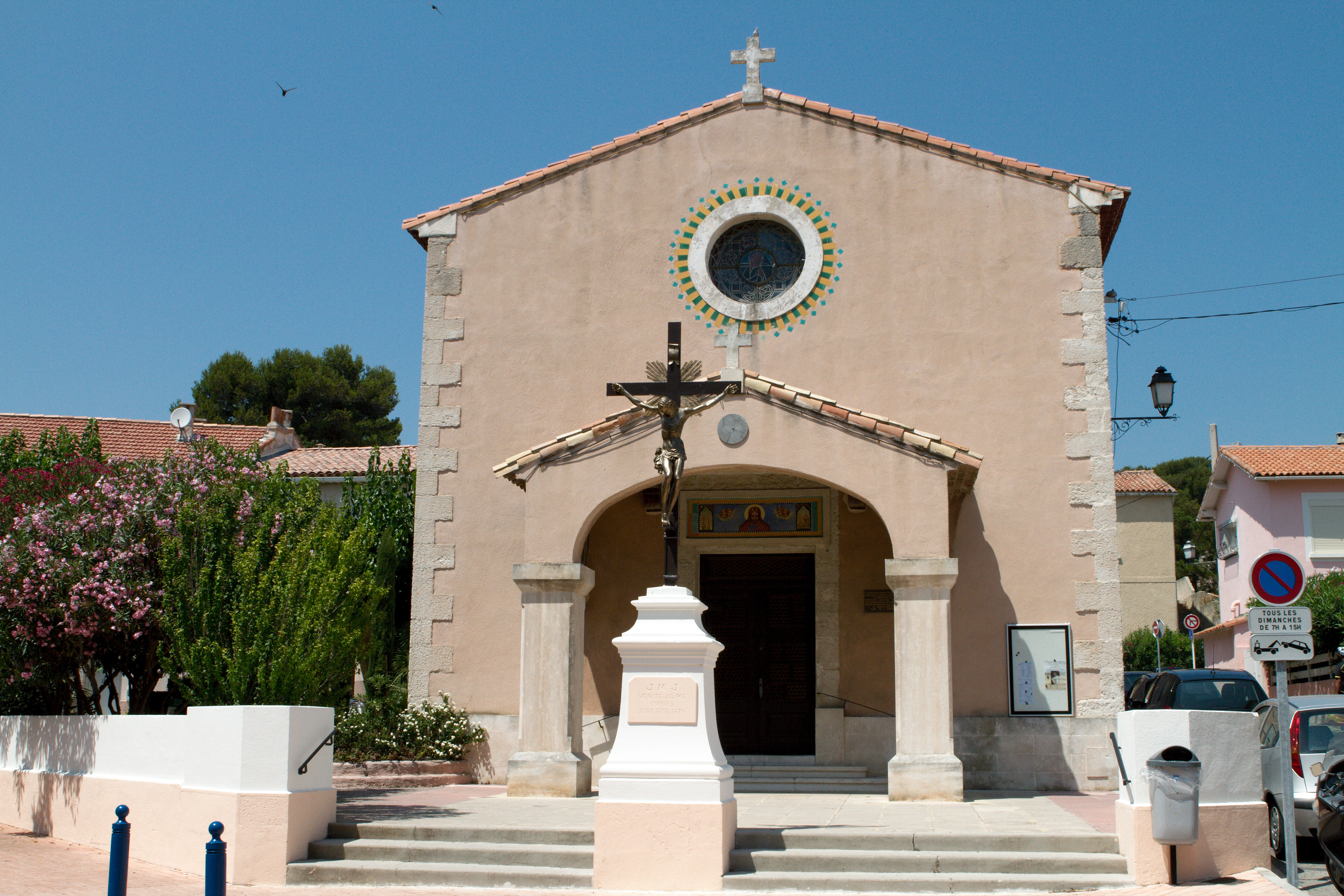
Saint-Pierre-ès-Liens church

== Demographics ==
Historical population

Year	Pop.	±% p.a.
1926	343	—
1931	348	+0.29%
1936	477	+6.51%
1946	512	+0.71%
1954	600	+2.00%
1962	1,074	+7.55%
1968	1,066	−0.12%
1975	2,205	+10.94%

Year	Pop.	±% p.a.
1982	3,876	+8.39%
1990	5,541	+4.57%
1999	7,228	+3.00%
2007	7,304	+0.13%
2012	7,703	+1.07%
2017	7,568	−0.35%
2023	7,574	+0.01%

Source: EHESS and INSEE (1968-2023)

== See also ==
- Communes of the Bouches-du-Rhône department
