= Marignane =

Commune in Provence-Alpes-Côte d'Azur, France

- Commune
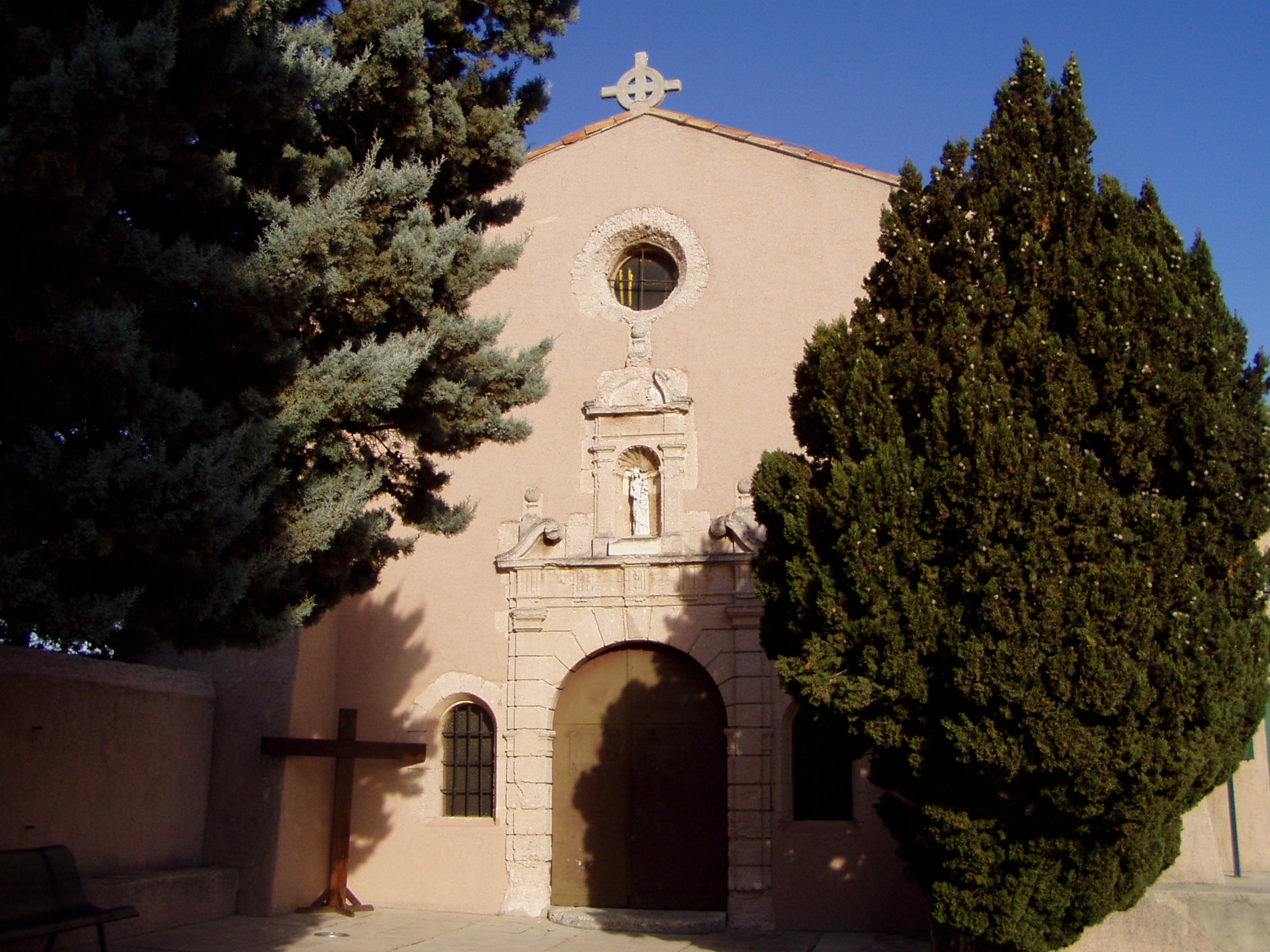
- Chapel of Notre Dame de Pitié

- Coat of arms
- Location of Marignane
- Location within France Location within Provence-Alpes-Côte d'Azur
- Coordinates: 43°24′58″N 5°12′52″E
- Country: France
- Region: Provence-Alpes-Côte d'Azur
- Department: Bouches-du-Rhône
- Arrondissement: Istres
- Canton: Marignane
- Intercommunality: Aix-Marseille-Provence

Government
  - Mayor (2026–32): Eric Le Dissès
- Area^{1}: 23.16 km^{2} (8.94 sq mi)
- Elevation: 15 m (49 ft)
- Highest elevation: 100 m (330 ft)
- Lowest elevation: 0 m (0 ft)
- Population (2023): 33,692
  - Density: 1,455/km^{2} (3,768/sq mi)
- Time zone: UTC+01:00 (CET)
  - Summer (DST): UTC+02:00 (CEST)
- INSEE/Postal code: 13054 /13700
- ^{1} French Land Register data, which excludes lakes, ponds, glaciers > 1 km^{2} (0.386 sq mi or 247 acres) and river estuaries.

Marignane (French pronunciation: [maʁiɲan]; Occitan: Marinhana) is a commune in the Bouches-du-Rhône department in the Provence-Alpes-Côte d'Azur region in southern France.

== Geography ==
It is a component of the Aix-Marseille-Provence Metropolis, and the largest suburb of the city of Marseille. It is located 18.3 km (11.4 mi) to the northwest of Marseille.

=== Climate ===
The climate is hot-summer mediterranean (Köppen: Csa). The city serves as the basis for data from Marseille through the weather station at the airport, which is inside Marignane's city limits.

Climate data for Marignane, elevation: 6 m (20 ft) (1991-2020 normals, extremes 1921-present)
Month	Jan	Feb	Mar	Apr	May	Jun	Jul	Aug	Sep	Oct	Nov	Dec	Year
Record high °C (°F)	19.9 (67.8)	22.5 (72.5)	25.4 (77.7)	29.6 (85.3)	34.9 (94.8)	39.6 (103.3)	40.5 (104.9)	39.2 (102.6)	36.8 (98.2)	30.4 (86.7)	25.2 (77.4)	20.7 (69.3)	40.5 (104.9)
Mean daily maximum °C (°F)	11.8 (53.2)	12.8 (55.0)	16.4 (61.5)	19.3 (66.7)	23.5 (74.3)	27.9 (82.2)	30.7 (87.3)	30.5 (86.9)	25.9 (78.6)	21.3 (70.3)	15.7 (60.3)	12.4 (54.3)	20.7 (69.3)
Daily mean °C (°F)	7.7 (45.9)	8.3 (46.9)	11.4 (52.5)	14.3 (57.7)	18.4 (65.1)	22.5 (72.5)	25.2 (77.4)	24.9 (76.8)	20.9 (69.6)	17.0 (62.6)	11.7 (53.1)	8.4 (47.1)	15.9 (60.6)
Mean daily minimum °C (°F)	3.6 (38.5)	3.7 (38.7)	6.5 (43.7)	9.4 (48.9)	13.3 (55.9)	17.2 (63.0)	19.7 (67.5)	19.4 (66.9)	15.9 (60.6)	12.6 (54.7)	7.7 (45.9)	4.4 (39.9)	11.1 (52.0)
Record low °C (°F)	−12.4 (9.7)	−16.8 (1.8)	−10.0 (14.0)	−2.4 (27.7)	0.0 (32.0)	5.4 (41.7)	7.8 (46.0)	8.1 (46.6)	1.0 (33.8)	−2.2 (28.0)	−5.8 (21.6)	−12.8 (9.0)	−16.8 (1.8)
Average precipitation mm (inches)	47.1 (1.85)	29.8 (1.17)	29.5 (1.16)	51.6 (2.03)	37.7 (1.48)	27.9 (1.10)	10.8 (0.43)	25.8 (1.02)	82.0 (3.23)	73.3 (2.89)	75.9 (2.99)	40.9 (1.61)	532.3 (20.96)
Average precipitation days (≥ 1.0 mm)	5.1	4.6	4.2	5.8	4.4	2.8	1.4	2.7	4.8	5.9	7.0	4.7	53.5
Average snowy days	0.9	0.5	0.0	0.0	0.0	0.0	0.0	0.0	0.0	0.0	0.3	0.2	1.9
Average relative humidity (%)	76	70	66	64	62	57	55	58	64	72	75	77	66
Average dew point °C (°F)	3 (37)	3 (37)	5 (41)	7 (45)	10 (50)	13 (55)	15 (59)	15 (59)	13 (55)	11 (52)	7 (45)	4 (39)	9 (48)
Mean monthly sunshine hours	147.9	173.1	234.7	250.8	298.6	337.8	372.2	333.8	263.7	196.1	150.8	138.1	2,897.6
Source 1: Meteociel
Source 2: Infoclimat.fr (snowy days) Time and Date

== History ==
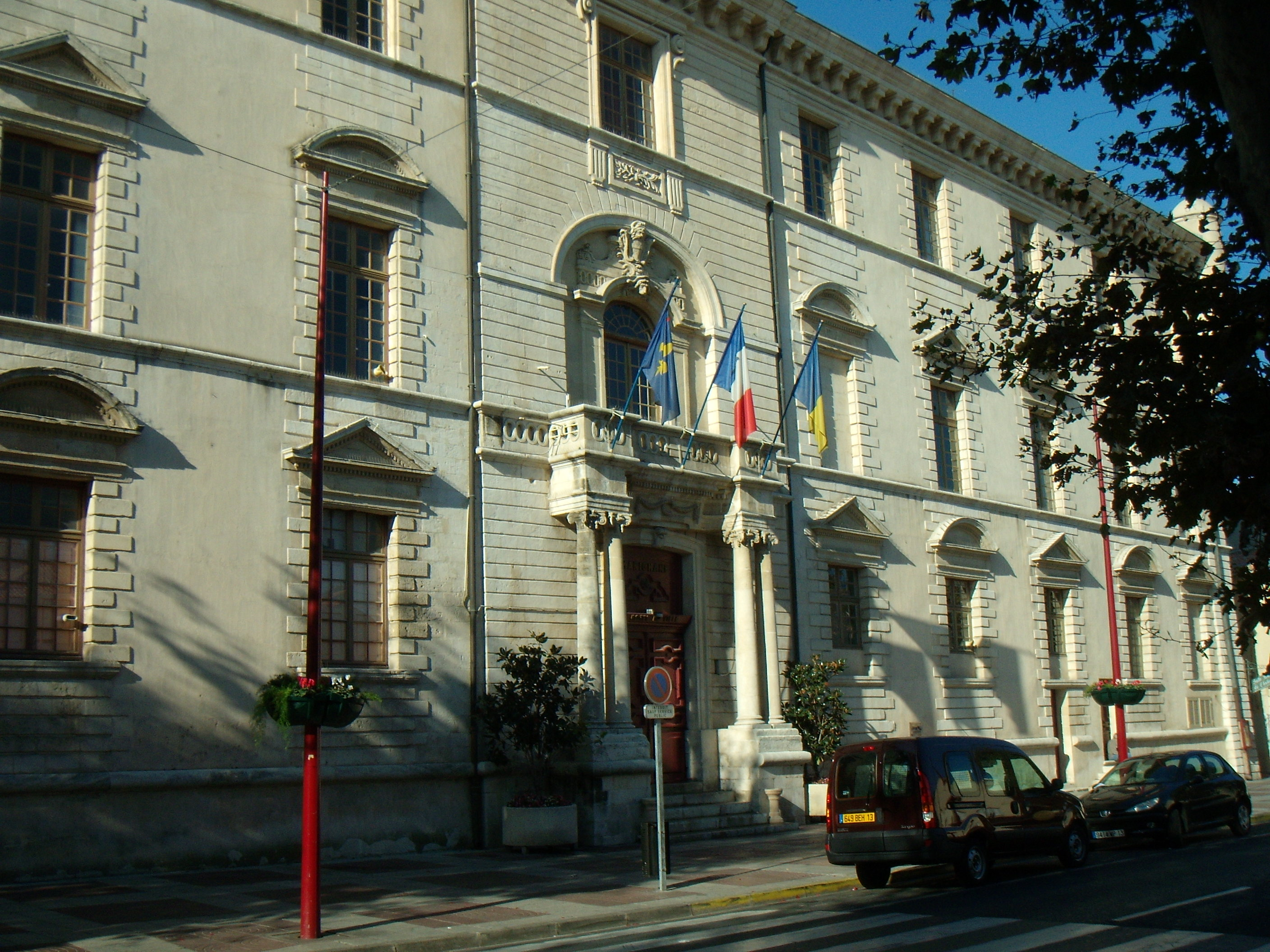
Château de Marignane

In the 15th century the Count of Provence owned the land, and from 1603 to the French Revolution it belonged to the Covet family. In the 17th century the Covet family refurbished the Château de Marignane, which now serves as the town hall.

Three chapels and one convent were built in the 17th and 18th century: Notre-Dame de Pitié (1635), Saint-Nicolas (1695), Sainte-Anne (1710, now demolished), and Couvent des Minimes (1695).

== Population ==
Historical population

Year	Pop.	±% p.a.
1793	1,532	—
1800	1,575	+0.40%
1806	1,601	+0.27%
1821	1,598	−0.01%
1831	1,633	+0.22%
1836	1,857	+2.60%
1841	1,998	+1.47%
1846	2,189	+1.84%
1851	2,183	−0.05%
1856	2,197	+0.13%
1861	2,233	+0.33%
1866	2,207	−0.23%
1872	2,209	+0.02%
1876	2,048	−1.87%
1881	1,853	−1.98%
1886	1,782	−0.78%
1891	1,761	−0.24%
1896	1,917	+1.71%
1901	1,898	−0.20%

Year	Pop.	±% p.a.
1906	1,956	+0.60%
1911	1,993	+0.38%
1921	2,517	+2.36%
1926	2,501	−0.13%
1931	3,184	+4.95%
1936	3,545	+2.17%
1946	4,344	+2.05%
1954	5,316	+2.56%
1962	10,664	+9.09%
1968	20,044	+11.09%
1975	26,477	+4.06%
1982	31,109	+2.33%
1990	32,325	+0.48%
1999	34,006	+0.56%
2007	33,159	−0.31%
2012	34,405	+0.74%
2017	32,920	−0.88%
2023	33,692	+0.39%

Source: EHESS and INSEE (1968-2023)

== Politics ==
From 1995 to 2008 the mayor was Daniel Simonpieri, former member of the Front National and of the MNR. Since 2008 the mayor has been Eric Le Dissès.

== Education ==
Public secondary schools:

- Collège Georges Brassens (junior high school)
- Lycée Maurice Genevoix (senior high school)

Private schools:

- Institution Saint Louis Sainte Marie (campuses in Marignane and Gignac-la-Nerthe)

== Personalities ==
- Aadil Assana, footballer

== Transport ==
Marseille Provence Airport is located in Marignane.

== Economy ==
Airbus Helicopters, the manufacturer of the Franco-German NHI NH90 and Tiger military helicopters, has its head office on the grounds of Marseille Provence Airport in Marignane.

== Twin towns - sister cities ==
Marignane is twinned with:

- Figueres, Spain
- Göd, Hungary
- Ravanusa, Italy
- Slănic, Romania
- Wolfsburg, Germany

== See also ==
- Étang de Berre
- Communes of the Bouches-du-Rhône department
