= Carry-le-Rouet =

Commune in Provence-Alpes-Côte d'Azur, France

Carry-le-Rouet Carri lo Roet (Occitan)
- Commune
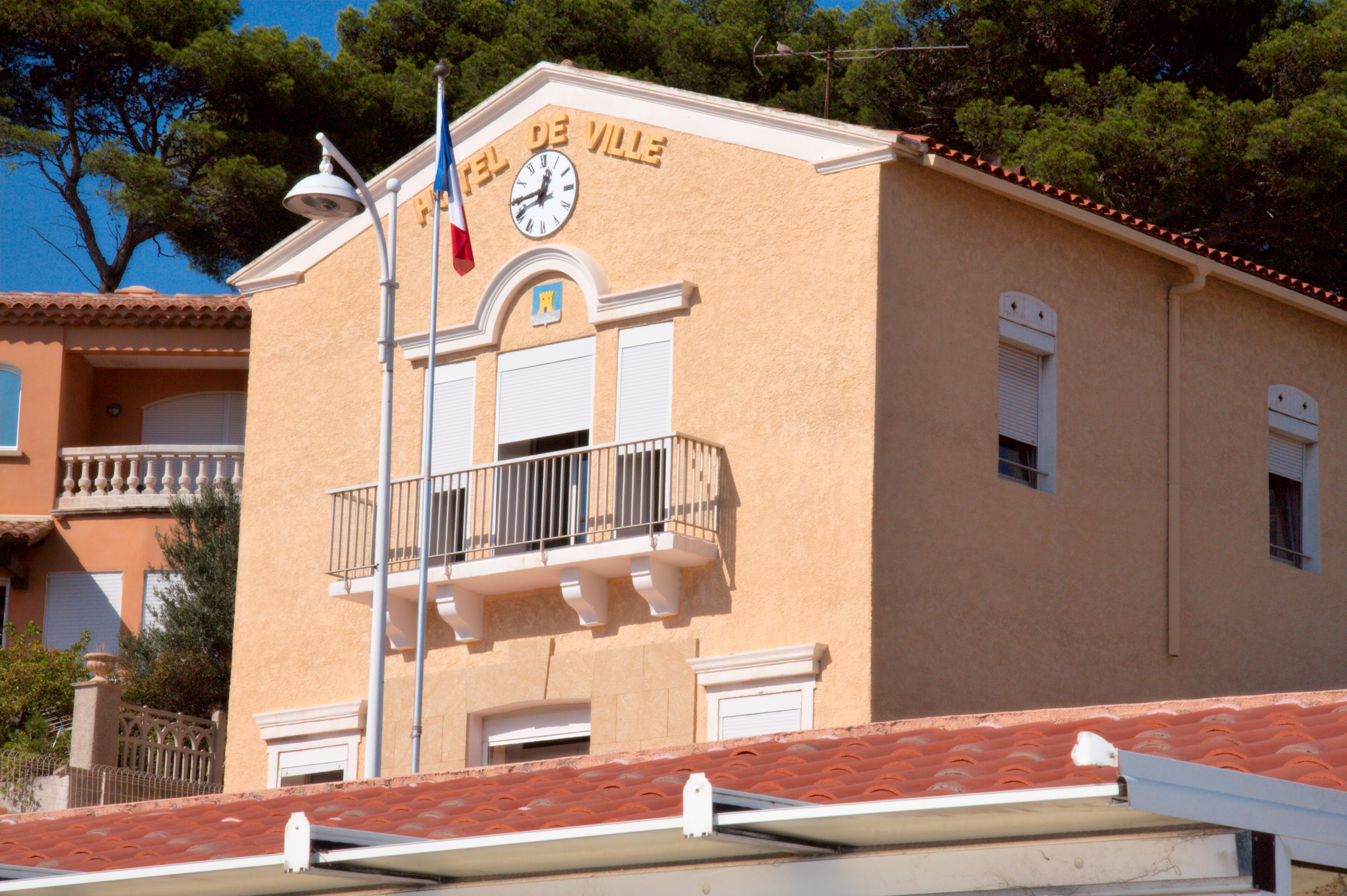
- Carry-le-Rouet Town Hall

- Coat of arms
- Location of Carry-le-Rouet
- Location within France Location within Provence-Alpes-Côte d'Azur
- Coordinates: 43°19′59″N 5°09′10″E
- Country: France
- Region: Provence-Alpes-Côte d'Azur
- Department: Bouches-du-Rhône
- Arrondissement: Istres
- Canton: Marignane
- Intercommunality: Aix-Marseille-Provence

Government
  - Mayor (2026–32): René-Francis Carpentier
- Area^{1}: 10 km^{2} (3.9 sq mi)
- Elevation: 4 m (13 ft)
- Highest elevation: 178 m (584 ft)
- Lowest elevation: 0 m (0 ft)
- Population (2023): 5,702
  - Density: 570/km^{2} (1,500/sq mi)
- Time zone: UTC+01:00 (CET)
  - Summer (DST): UTC+02:00 (CEST)
- INSEE/Postal code: 13021 /13620
- ^{1} French Land Register data, which excludes lakes, ponds, glaciers > 1 km^{2} (0.386 sq mi or 247 acres) and river estuaries.

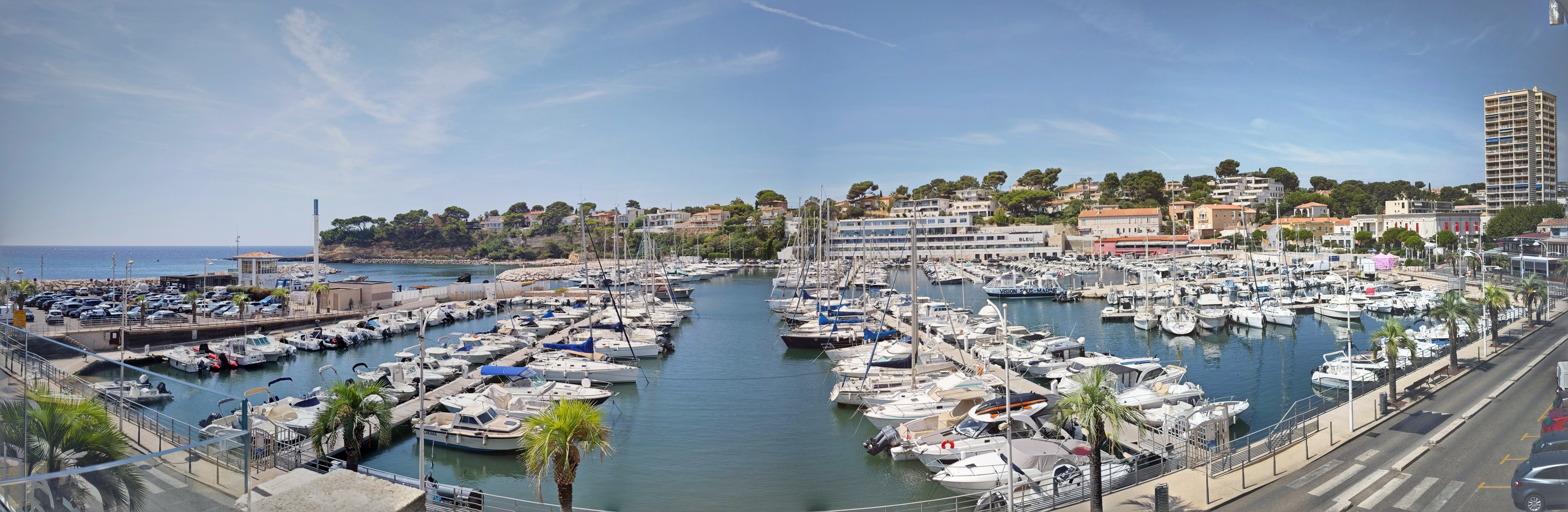
Harbour Panorama of Carry-le-Rouet

Carry-le-Rouet (French pronunciation: [kaʁi lə ʁwɛ]; Occitan: Carri lo Roet) or simply Carry is a commune in the Bouches-du-Rhône department in the Provence-Alpes-Côte d'Azur region in Southern France. It is a seaside resort 30 kilometres (19 mi) west of Marseille, on the Côte Bleue, reached via motorway A55 then route D5, at the foot of pine-covered hills. It is part of the Aix-Marseille-Provence Metropolis.

Every February, Les Oursinades festival takes place, celebrating the consumption of sea urchins, various shellfish and other seafood.

== Transport ==
Carry-le-Rouet is served by the Carry-le-Rouet TER PACA railway station (opened in 1915) on the Miramas–L'Estaque railway.

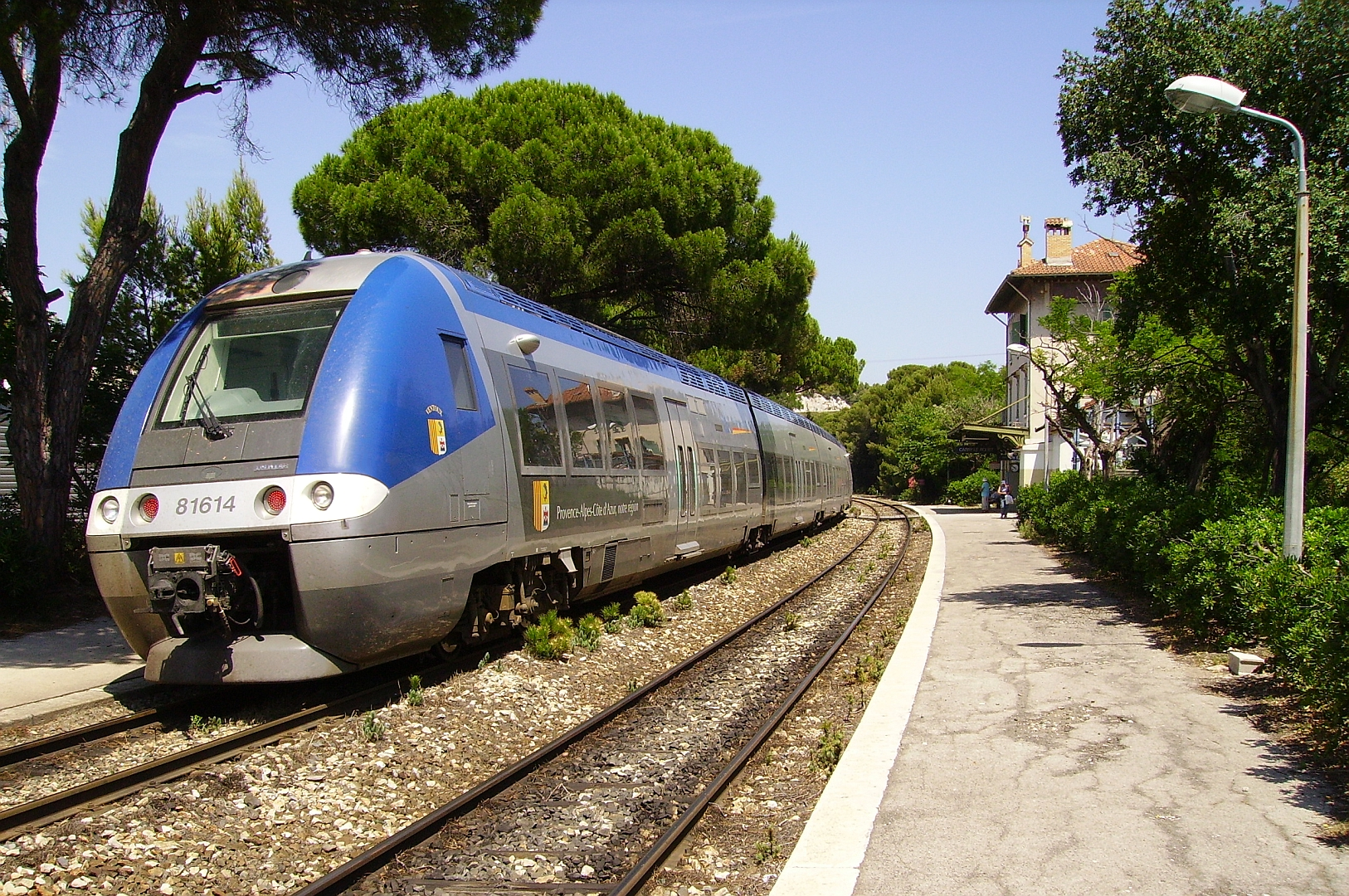
TER PACA service at Carry-le-Rouet station in 2010

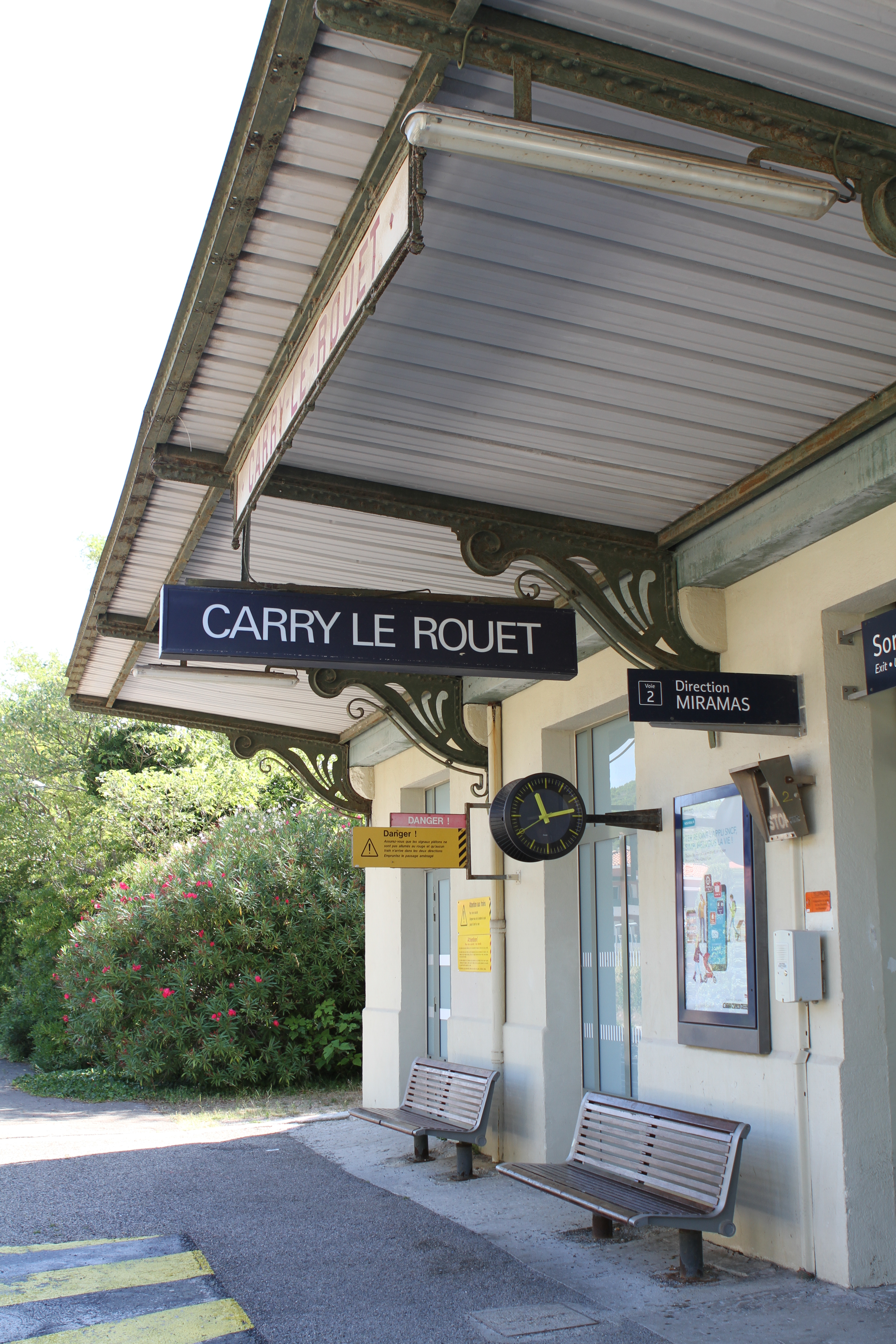
Station building

== Demographics ==
Historical population

Year	Pop.	±% p.a.
1793	290	—
1800	245	−2.38%
1806	268	+1.51%
1821	363	+2.04%
1831	356	−0.19%
1836	465	+5.49%
1841	503	+1.58%
1846	507	+0.16%
1851	502	−0.20%
1856	470	−1.31%
1861	499	+1.20%
1866	477	−0.90%
1872	567	+2.92%
1876	537	−1.35%
1881	547	+0.37%
1886	499	−1.82%
1891	561	+2.37%
1896	582	+0.74%
1901	531	−1.82%

Year	Pop.	±% p.a.
1906	564	+1.21%
1911	1,339	+18.88%
1921	565	−8.27%
1926	265	−14.05%
1931	353	+5.90%
1936	410	+3.04%
1946	646	+4.65%
1954	1,069	+6.50%
1962	1,739	+6.27%
1968	2,353	+5.17%
1975	3,304	+4.97%
1982	4,570	+4.74%
1990	5,224	+1.69%
1999	6,009	+1.57%
2007	6,342	+0.68%
2012	6,197	−0.46%
2017	5,823	−1.24%
2023	5,702	−0.35%

Source: EHESS and INSEE (1968–2023)

== Personalities ==
- Comic actor Fernandel, who built his family's house above the beach in the 1930s.
- The singer Nina Simone, who lived out the last years of her life in Carry-le-Rouet and died there in 2003.

== Sister cities ==
- Dietmannsried, Bavaria, Germany
- Busseto, Emilia-Romagna, Italy

== See also ==
- Communes of the Bouches-du-Rhône department
