= Le Rove =

Commune in Provence-Alpes-Côte d'Azur, France

Le Rove Lo Rove (Occitan)
- Commune
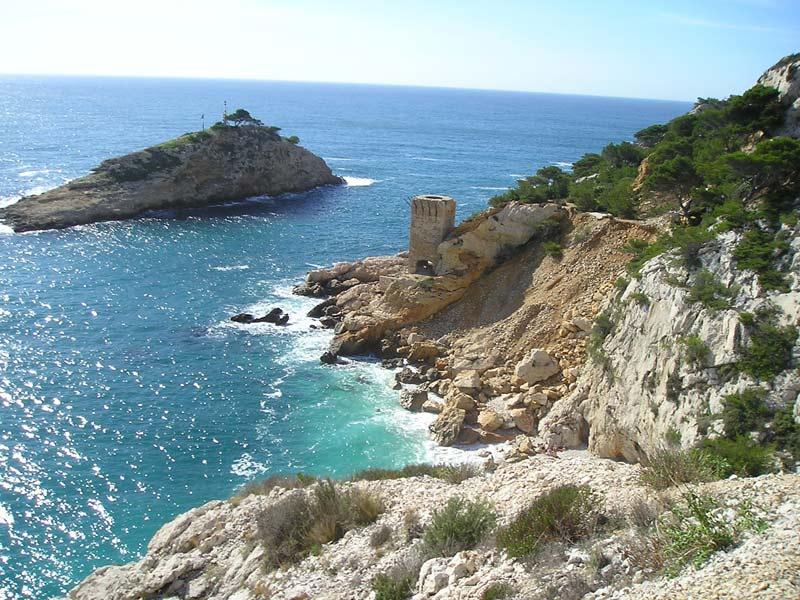
- The Niolon Cove, in Le Rove

- Coat of arms
- Location of Le Rove
- Location within France Location within Provence-Alpes-Côte d'Azur
- Coordinates: 43°22′09″N 5°15′01″E
- Country: France
- Region: Provence-Alpes-Côte d'Azur
- Department: Bouches-du-Rhône
- Arrondissement: Istres
- Canton: Marignane
- Intercommunality: Aix-Marseille-Provence

Government
  - Mayor (2026–32): Paul Sabatino
- Area^{1}: 22.97 km^{2} (8.87 sq mi)
- Elevation: 150 m (490 ft)
- Highest elevation: 263 m (863 ft)
- Lowest elevation: 0 m (0 ft)
- Population (2023): 5,246
  - Density: 228.4/km^{2} (591.5/sq mi)
- Demonym(s): Rovenain (masculine); Rovenaine (feminine)
- Time zone: UTC+01:00 (CET)
  - Summer (DST): UTC+02:00 (CEST)
- INSEE/Postal code: 13088 /13740
- ^{1} French Land Register data, which excludes lakes, ponds, glaciers > 1 km^{2} (0.386 sq mi or 247 acres) and river estuaries.

Le Rove (French pronunciation: [lə ʁɔv]; Provençal: Lo Rove) is a seaside commune in the Bouches-du-Rhône department in the Provence-Alpes-Côte d'Azur region in Southern France.

It is located on the Côte Bleue just northwest of Marseille, neighbouring its 16th arrondissement within the larger Aix-Marseille-Provence Metropolis. It consists of a main village at Le Rove which houses the town hall, as well as a variety of hamlets and other settlements.

The Rove Tunnel, the world's longest canal tunnel at 7,120 metres (23,360 ft), has its southeastern entrance situated in Marseille near Le Rove, although a sizeable portion crosses the commune underground (from the Mediterranean towards the Étang de Berre), hence its name. It has been out of service since 1963.

Georges Rosso (1929–2025), the mayor of Le Rove, was the oldest mayor of any French city, at 93 years of age.

== Transport ==
Le Rove is served by the Niolon TER PACA railway station (opened in 1915) on the Miramas–L'Estaque railway.

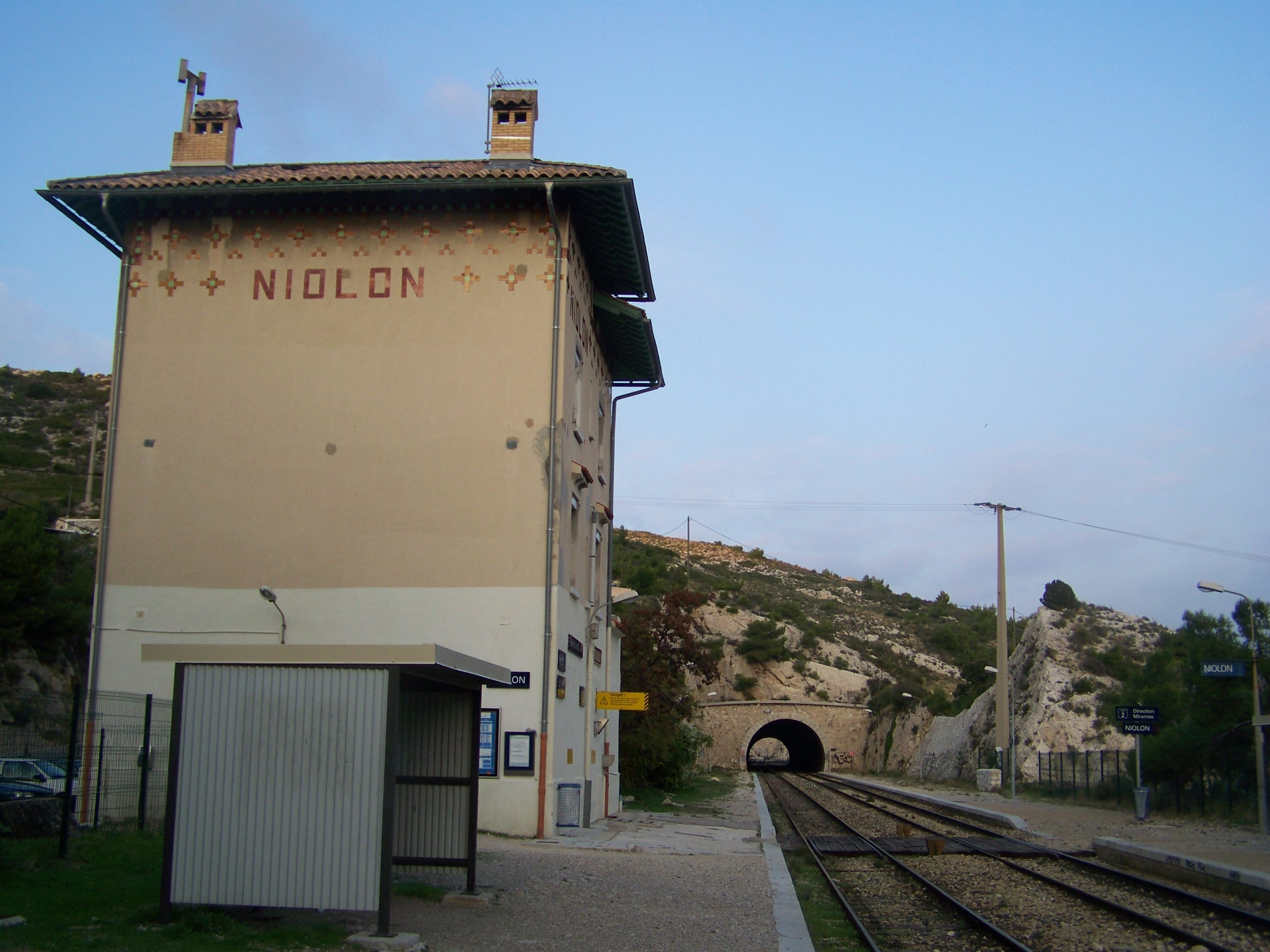
Station building

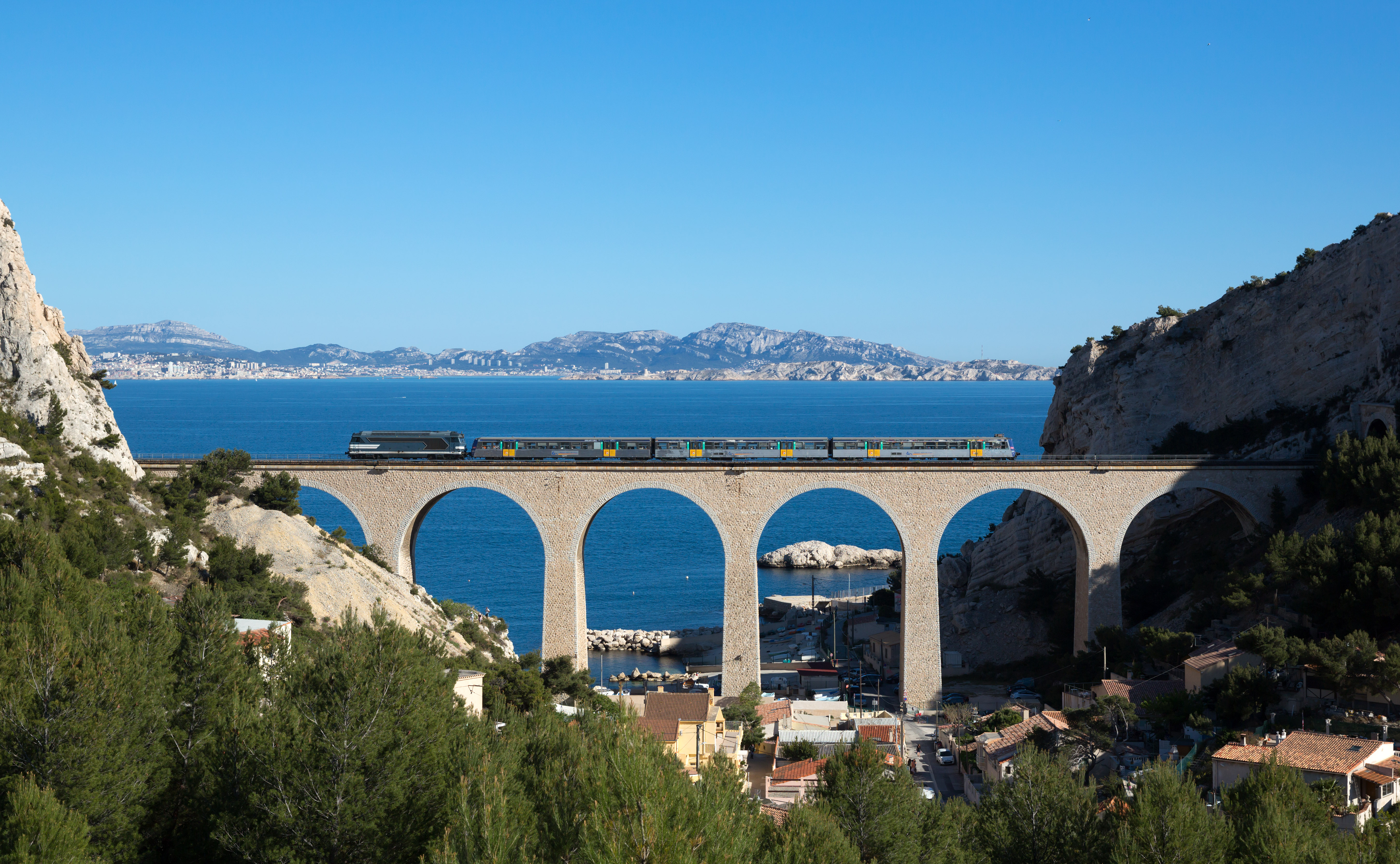
Railway line in Niolon

== Demographics ==
Historical population

Year	Pop.	±% p.a.
1836	844	—
1841	880	+0.84%
1846	1,074	+4.06%
1851	849	−4.59%
1856	816	−0.79%
1861	875	+1.41%
1866	820	−1.29%
1872	790	−0.62%
1876	755	−1.13%
1881	729	−0.70%
1886	661	−1.94%
1891	726	+1.89%
1896	742	+0.44%
1901	704	−1.05%
1906	747	+1.19%
1911	2,122	+23.22%

Year	Pop.	±% p.a.
1921	678	−10.78%
1926	688	+0.29%
1931	869	+4.78%
1936	485	−11.01%
1946	516	+0.62%
1954	705	+3.98%
1962	1,186	+6.72%
1968	1,709	+6.28%
1975	2,233	+3.89%
1982	2,707	+2.79%
1990	3,429	+3.00%
1999	4,031	+1.81%
2007	4,124	+0.29%
2012	4,507	+1.79%
2017	5,128	+2.62%
2023	5,246	+0.38%

Source: EHESS and INSEE (1968–2023)

== Notable people ==
- Sébastien Chato (born 1961), singer, author, composer, lived in Le Rove
- Alexandre Fabre (born 1955), actor, lives in Le Rove
- Maurice Gouiran (born 1946), thriller writer, born in Le Rove
- Malika Haimeur (born 1956), awarded the Irène Joliot-Curie Prize for Women & Business in 2009
- Franky Zapata (born 1978), creator of the Flyboard, lived in Le Rove with his workshop still there

== See also ==
- Communes of the Bouches-du-Rhône department
