= Châteauneuf-les-Martigues =

Commune in Provence-Alpes-Côte d'Azur, France

Châteauneuf-les-Martigues Castèunòu dau Martegue (Occitan)
- Commune
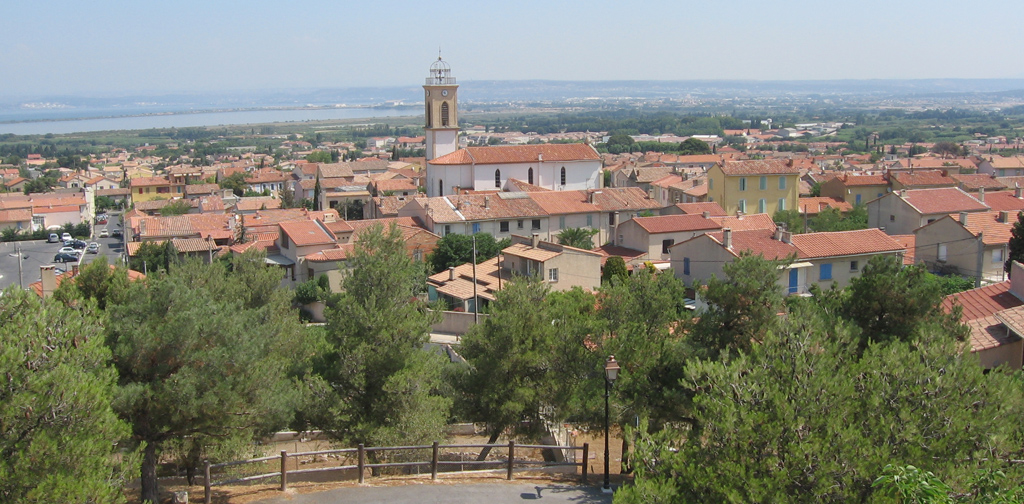
- A panoramic view of Châteauneuf-les-Martigues

- Coat of arms
- Location of Châteauneuf-les-Martigues
- Location within France Location within Provence-Alpes-Côte d'Azur
- Coordinates: 43°23′02″N 5°09′54″E
- Country: France
- Region: Provence-Alpes-Côte d'Azur
- Department: Bouches-du-Rhône
- Arrondissement: Istres
- Canton: Marignane
- Intercommunality: Aix-Marseille-Provence

Government
  - Mayor (2026–32): Roland Mouren
- Area^{1}: 31.65 km^{2} (12.22 sq mi)
- Elevation: 40 m (130 ft)
- Highest elevation: 203 m (666 ft)
- Lowest elevation: 0 m (0 ft)
- Population (2023): 18,455
  - Density: 583.1/km^{2} (1,510/sq mi)
- Time zone: UTC+01:00 (CET)
  - Summer (DST): UTC+02:00 (CEST)
- INSEE/Postal code: 13026 /13220
- ^{1} French Land Register data, which excludes lakes, ponds, glaciers > 1 km^{2} (0.386 sq mi or 247 acres) and river estuaries.

Châteauneuf-les-Martigues (French: [ʃɑtonœf le maʁtiɡ]; Occitan: Castèunòu dau Martegue) is a commune in the Bouches-du-Rhône department in southern France. The La Mède refinery is nearby and has been in operation since 1935.

== Population ==
Historical population

| Year | Pop. | ±% p.a. |
|---|---|---|
| 1793 | 571 | — |
| 1800 | 527 | −1.14% |
| 1806 | 483 | −1.44% |
| 1821 | 477 | −0.08% |
| 1831 | 714 | +4.12% |
| 1836 | 957 | +6.03% |
| 1841 | 991 | +0.70% |
| 1846 | 984 | −0.14% |
| 1851 | 1,033 | +0.98% |
| 1856 | 1,150 | +2.17% |
| 1861 | 1,220 | +1.19% |
| 1866 | 1,227 | +0.11% |
| 1872 | 1,241 | +0.19% |
| 1876 | 1,205 | −0.73% |
| 1881 | 1,013 | −3.41% |
| 1886 | 1,084 | +1.36% |
| 1891 | 1,100 | +0.29% |
| 1896 | 1,125 | +0.45% |
| 1901 | 1,073 | −0.94% |

| Year | Pop. | ±% p.a. |
|---|---|---|
| 1906 | 1,164 | +1.64% |
| 1911 | 1,488 | +5.03% |
| 1921 | 1,371 | −0.82% |
| 1926 | 1,523 | +2.13% |
| 1931 | 1,603 | +1.03% |
| 1936 | 2,325 | +7.72% |
| 1946 | 2,536 | +0.87% |
| 1954 | 3,611 | +4.52% |
| 1962 | 4,822 | +3.68% |
| 1968 | 6,781 | +5.85% |
| 1975 | 8,600 | +3.45% |
| 1982 | 10,173 | +2.43% |
| 1990 | 10,911 | +0.88% |
| 1999 | 11,375 | +0.46% |
| 2007 | 11,643 | +0.29% |
| 2012 | 13,277 | +2.66% |
| 2017 | 16,850 | +4.88% |
| 2023 | 18,455 | +1.53% |

Source: EHESS and INSEE (1968-2023)

== See also ==
- Étang de Berre
- Communes of the Bouches-du-Rhône department
