= L'Estaque =

Village in France

Coordinates: 43°21′41″N 5°18′51″E

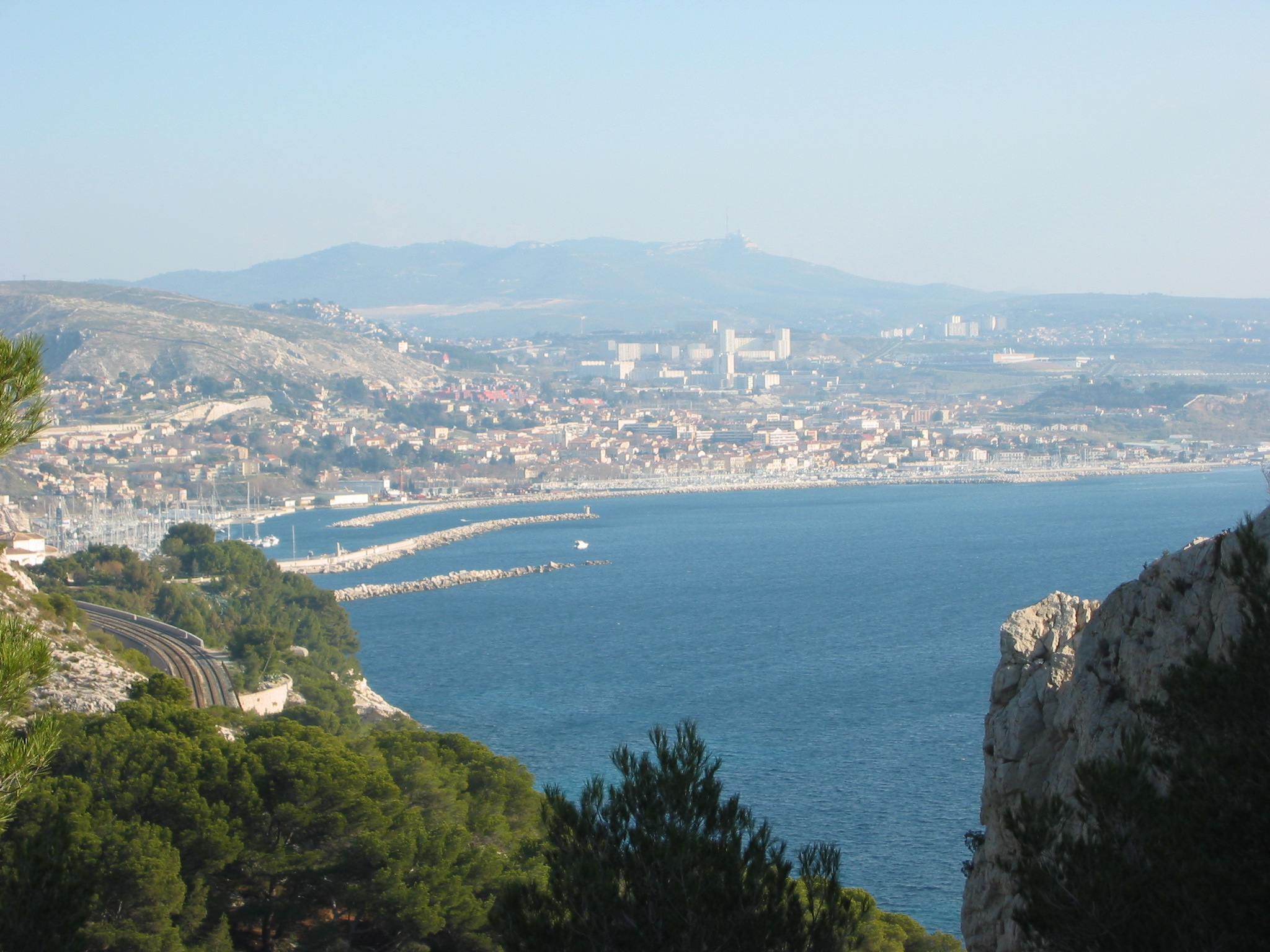
L'Estaque, 2006

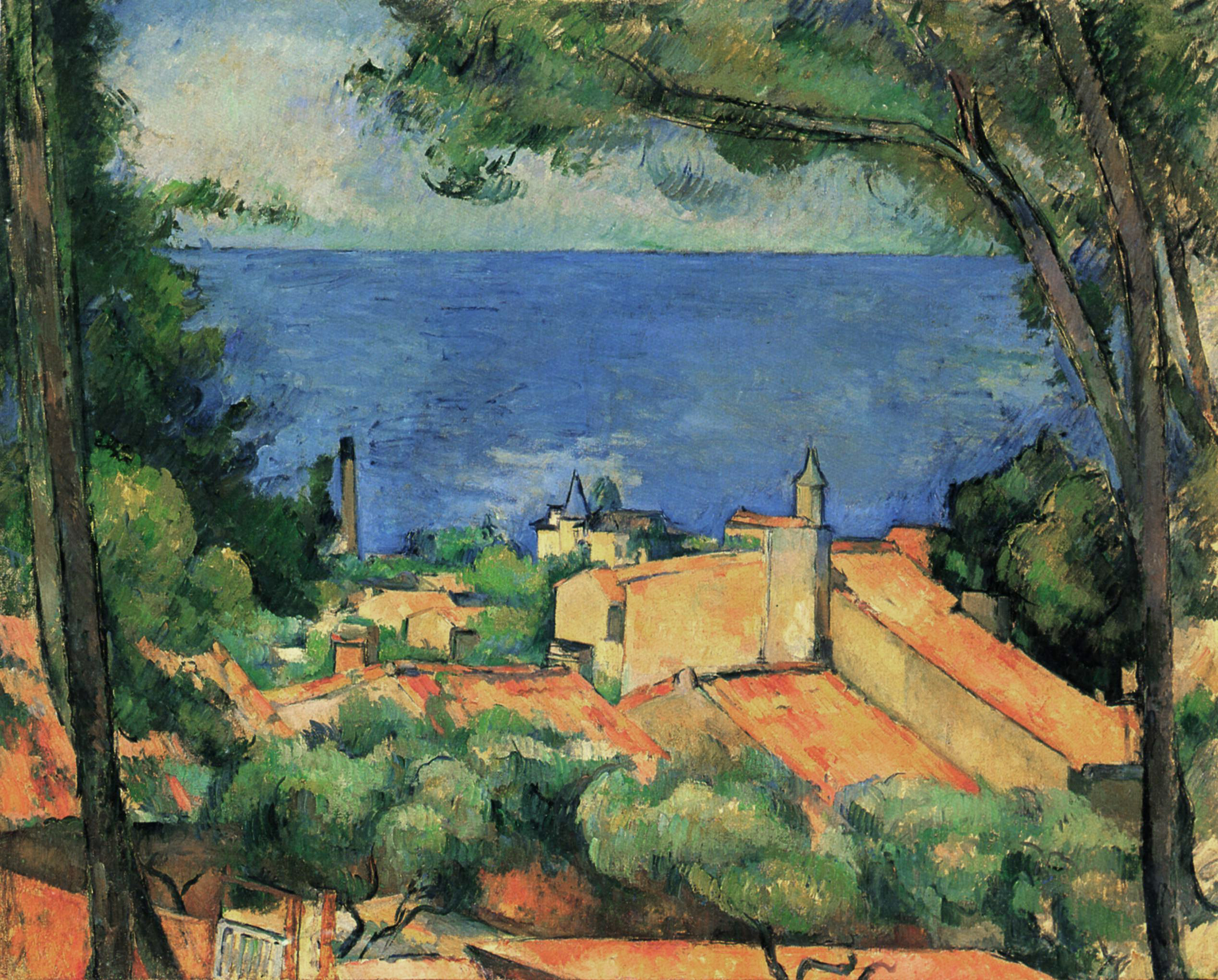
Paul Cézanne, L'Estaque, 1883–1885

L'Estaque (French pronunciation: [lɛstak]; Occitan: L'Estaca) is a village in southern France, just west of Marseille. Administratively, it belongs to the 16th arrondissement of the commune of Marseille.

== Overview ==
Many artists of the Impressionist and Post-Impressionist periods visited or resided there or in the surrounding area. Many of them painted village scenes, the road leading to the village, and the view of the Bay from the village. Paul Cézanne painted many views of the water from his room in L'Estaque, showing the changing seasons, the shifting light of day, and the changes in the village itself over time.

In February 2010, a Fondation Monticelli was set up at L'Estaque. It exhibits some of pre-impressionist painter Adolphe Monticelli's most representative artwork, together with paintings from other Maîtres provençaux such as Jean-Baptiste Olive. The foundation's location features one of the most eye-catching views of the bay of Marseille.
