= Laurent Lhardit =

French politician

Member of the National Assembly of France for Bouches-du-Rhône's 2nd constituency
- Incumbent
- Assumed office 8 July 2024
- Preceded by: Claire Pitollat

Personal details
- Born: 20 April 1963 (age 62); Marseille, France
- Political party: Socialist

Laurent Lhardit (born 20 April 1963) is a French politician who was elected deputy of Bouches-du-Rhône's 2nd constituency on 7 July 2024. A member of the Socialist Party (PS), he was previously deputy mayor of Marseille from 2020 to 2024.

== Biography ==
Lhardit is originally from the Marseille district of La Pointe-Rouge. He is a graduate of the Institut d'études politiques de Lyon.

Laurent Lhardit joined the Socialist Party in 1988, following the appointment of Michel Rocard to Matignon. He worked with the Socialist MP Michel Pezet, to whom he remained close. In 1997, he founded his consultancy firm.

He was elected district councilor for the 3rd sector of Marseille during the 2014 municipal elections. In 2020, he was elected municipal councilor of Marseille on the Printemps Marseillais list. He became 16th deputy to the new mayor of Marseille, Michèle Rubirola, responsible for economic dynamism, employment and sustainable tourism. He retained his delegation when Benoît Payan succeeded Michèle Rubirola as mayor in December 2020.

For the 2024 legislative elections, Laurent Lhardit is the candidate of the New Popular Front in the Bouches-du-Rhône's 2nd constituency, which corresponds to the 7th and 8th arrondissements of Marseille. He came second in the first round with 28.49% of the vote, behind Olivier Rioult of the RN-RAD alliance (32.06%) but ahead of the outgoing Ensemble deputy Claire Pitollat (27.01%). The latter withdrew, giving her support to "Laurent Lhardit's candidacy [and his] humanist and respectable values". He was elected in the second round with more than 53% of the vote.

It was the first time that the Left won the constituency since the 1973 French legislative election. Laurent Lhardit believes that a change in the sociology of the 7th arrondissement is at work; he sees "new arrivals, rather young, voting more to the left and sensitive to ecology".

== Election results ==
Year	Party	Constituency	1st ^{round}			2nd ^{round}		
Year	Party	Constituency	Votes	%	Rank	Votes	%	Issue
2024	NFP-PS	Bouches-du-Rhône's 2nd constituency	16,740	28.49	2nd	28,677	53.64	Elected

== See also ==
- List of deputies of the 17th National Assembly of France
