= 2026 Marseille municipal election =

- 15 March 2026 (first round); 22 March 2026 (second round)

All 111 members of the Municipal Council 56 seats needed for a majority
- Turnout: 52.17% (first round) ▲19.4 pp 55.40% (second round) ▲20 pp
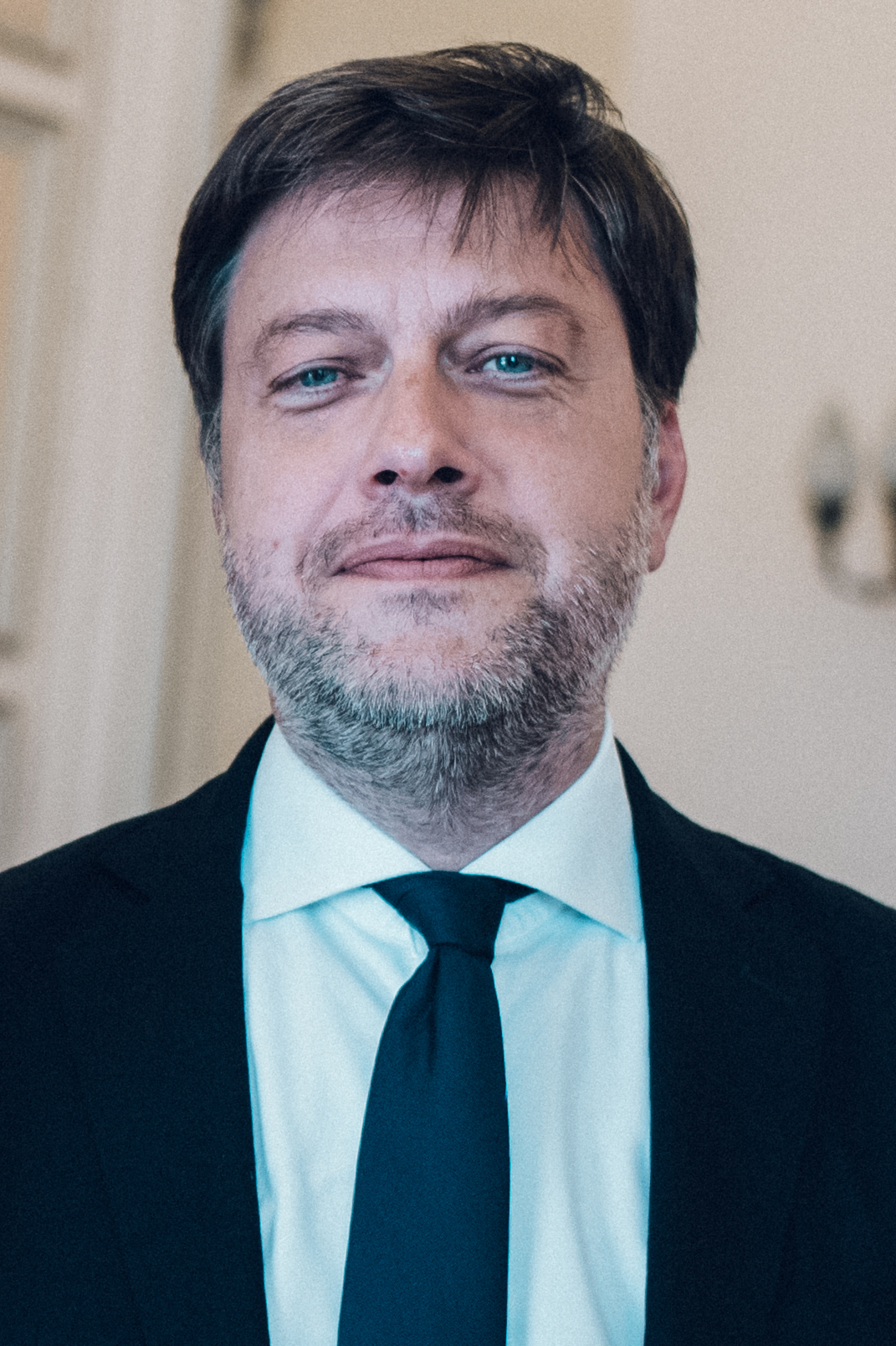

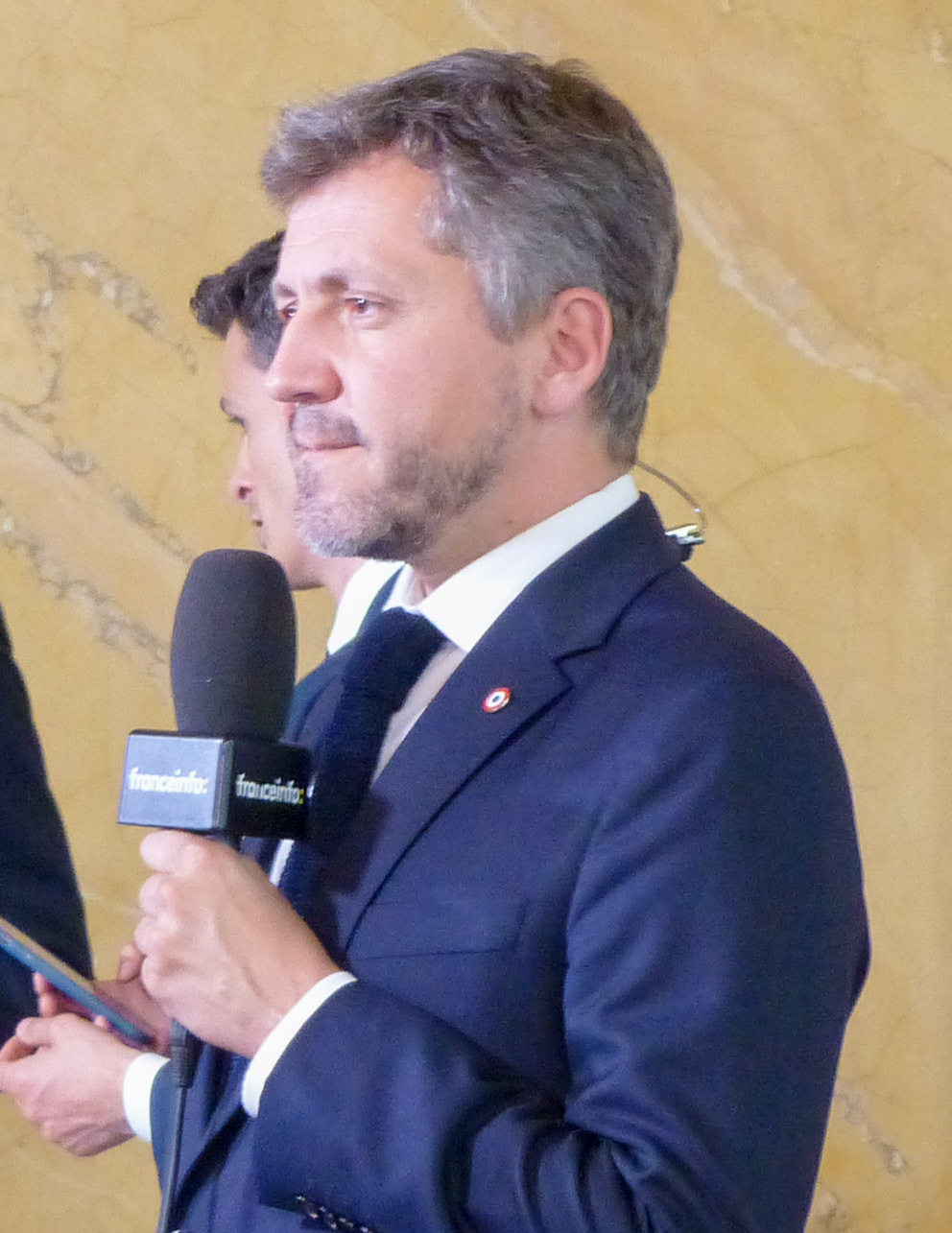

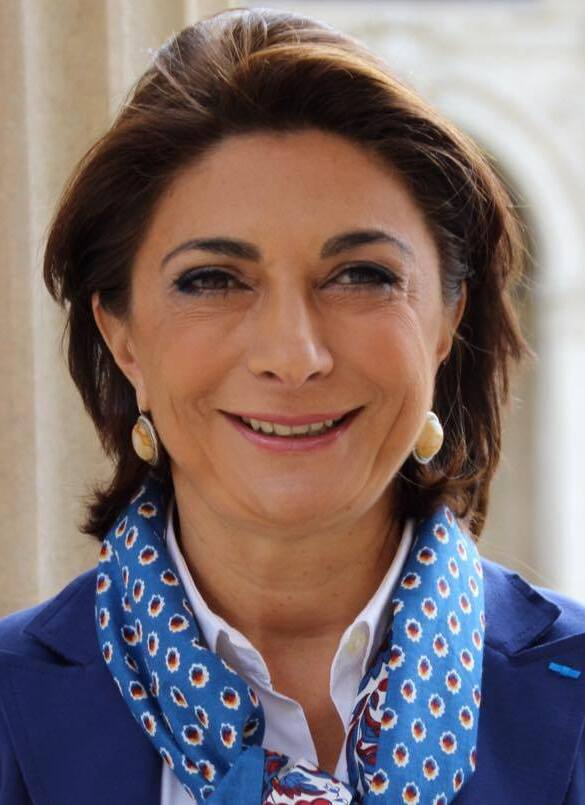
	First party	Second party
Candidate	Benoît Payan	Franck Allisio
Party	DVG	RN
Last election	50 seats	9 seats
Seats won	73	34
Seat change	▲23	▲25
Popular vote	103,883	99,137
Percentage	36.69%	35.02%
Popular vote (2nd)	163,586	121,310
Percentage (2nd)	54.34%	40.30%
	Third party
Candidate	Martine Vassal
Party	DVD
Last election	39 seats
Seats won	4
Seat change	▼35
Popular vote	35,131
Percentage	12.41%
Popular vote (2nd)	16,134
Percentage (2nd)	5.36%
Mayor before election
Benoît Payan
DVG
Elected Mayor
Benoît Payan
DVG

The 2026 Marseille municipal election was held on 15 March to elect the municipal council of Marseille (which in turn elects the mayor), with an eventual runoff on 22 March. This election followed the tenure of Mayor Benoît Payan, in office since December 2020, who ran for a full term. Following a second round of elections, Payan was declared the winner of the election.

== Background ==
Benoît Payan, a member of the Socialist Party (PS), was first elected mayor in 2020, after Michèle Rubirola, who had only served for a few months, resigned. He quit the PS after his election, preferring to focus on local rather than national politics. LFI, which was part of his majority at the beginning, split away as the mayor became more and more critical of the party. Payan announced his intention to run for reelection in 2026, while LFI member Sébastien Delogu announced his intention to challenge the mayor. Martine Vassal, candidate for The Republicans (LR) in 2020, also announced her intention to run. She had quit her party in 2022, but nevertheless gathered its support as well as the support of centre-right parties Renaissance (RE) and Horizons (HOR) that did not support her in 2020. Senator Stéphane Ravier, candidate for the National Rally (RN) in 2020, quit his party in 2022 and initially intended to run with his local party Marseille d'Abord, but finally announced he was supporting Franck Allisio (RN) in his candidacy. Allisio managed to get the support of some of Martine Vassal's close allies, making them join the Union of the Right for the Republic (UDR).

== Electoral system and context ==
The 2026 election was influenced by ongoing discussions about electoral reform in Marseille. President Macron proposed that mayors in Paris, Lyon, and Marseille be elected by direct universal suffrage rather than by an electoral college of city councilors, a system viewed as "anti-democratic" by some candidates.

== Candidates ==
=== Miscellaneous left ===
- Christine Juste
- Benoît Payan, incumbent mayor

Payan was also supported by PS, LE, PCF and PP.

=== Miscellaneous right ===
- Erwan Davoux
- Martine Vassal, president of the Departmental Council of Bouches-du-Rhône, municipal councillor

Vassal was also supported by LR, RE, HOR, UDI and MoDem.

=== La France Insoumise ===
- Sébastien Delogu, deputy

=== National Rally ===
- Franck Allisio, deputy and municipal councillor

Allisio was also supported by UDR and REC.

== Campaign ==
In November 2025, Frédéric Collart withdrew from the race just after Erwann Davoux announced he was a candidate, in an alliance with Nora Preziosi. In December 2025, Martine Vassal caused a scandal by publicly refusing to rule out of an alliance in the second round with Franck Allisio of the National Rally. Following protests against such an alliance in Renaissance (that supports her candidacy), Vassal reasserted her will to fight against the "extremes" and denied any rumors of fusion with Allisio. Also in December 2025, in his first campaign meeting, Sébastien Delogu made controversial statements about the police. Franck Allisio and Martine Vassal condemned his words, and so did the prefect of the department. On 19 March, the candidate of LFI withdrew from the race in order to minimalise the risk of a RN candidate winning.

== Polling ==

=== First round ===
Polling firm	Fieldwork date	Sample size	Bazzali LO	Delogu LFI	Payan DVG	Davoux DVD	Vassal DVD	Allisio RN	Others
Ifop	23-28 Feb 2025	703	0.5%	13%	35%	1.5%	18%	32%	—
Cluster17	23-25 Feb 2026	807	0.5%	15%	34%	2.5%	15%	33%	—
OpinionWay	16-23 Feb 2026	1,010	<1%	14%	34%	2%	14%	34%	2%
Elabe	9-16 Feb 2026	800	1%	12%	31%	2%	21%	29%	4%
OpinionWay	6-12 Jan 2026	703	1%	14%	31%	3%	20%	31%	—
Ipsos	2-8 Jan 2026	801	1%	14%	30%	2%	23%	30%	—
Ifop	25-30 Nov 2025	829	—	15%	30%	2%	26%	27%	—
Cluster17	4-7 Nov 2025	816	0.5%	16%	29%	—	23%	29%	2.5%
Ifop	28-31 Oct 2025	700	—	13%	32%	—	29%	23%	3%

=== Second round ===
Polling firm	Fieldwork date	Sample size	Delogu LFI	Payan DVG	Vassal DVD	Allisio RN
Ifop	23-28 Feb 2025	703	11%	38%	17%	34%
Ifop	23-28 Feb 2025	703	—	46%	18%	36%
Ifop	23-28 Feb 2025	703	—	55%	—	45%
OpinionWay	16-23 Feb 2026	1,010	13%	36%	15%	37%
OpinionWay	16-23 Feb 2026	1,010	—	47%	15%	38%
Elabe	9-16 Feb 2026	800	12%	34%	22%	32%
Elabe	9-16 Feb 2026	800	—	45%	23%	32%
Elabe	9-16 Feb 2026	800	14%	44%	—	42%
Elabe	9-16 Feb 2026	800	—	56%	—	44%
OpinionWay	6-12 Jan 2026	703	15%	43%	—	42%
OpinionWay	6-12 Jan 2026	703	—	55%	—	45%
Cluster17	4-7 Nov 2025	816	16.5%	30.5%	24%	29%
Cluster17	4-7 Nov 2025	816	—	45%	25%	30%
Ifop	28-31 Oct 2025	700	—	39%	34%	27%

== Results ==
Candidate	Party	First round		Second round		Seats	
Candidate	Party	Votes	%	Votes	%	Nb.	+/-
Benoît Payan	DVG-PS-LE-PCF-PP-G.s-GRS-D!-GÉ-ND	103,883	36.70%	163,586	54.34%	73	+23
Franck Allisio	RN-UDR-REC-RPR	99,137	35.02%	121,310	40.30%	34	+25
Martine Vassal	DVD-LR-RE-HOR-UDI-MoDem-LC-RES	35,131	12.41%	16,134	5.36%	4	−35
Sébastien Delogu	LFI-REV-POI-PG-NPA	33,808	11.94%	Withdrawal		0	0
Erwan Davoux	DVC	5,248	1.85%	—		0	0
Christine Juste	DVG	2,727	0.96%	—		0	0
Rémy Bazzali	LO	2,071	0.73%	—		0	0
Coralie Raynaud	PT	1,069	0.38%	—		0	0
Registered voters			100.00		100.00		
Abstention				3,215	1.04		
Total votes				307,704			
Blank or invalid votes				3,459	1.12		
Valid votes							

== Sector mayors ==
Sector	Outgoing member	Party	Elected mayor	Party	Of total
Marseille	Benoît Payan	DVG	Benoît Payan	DVG	54.34%
1st	Sophie Camard	GRS	Sophie Camard	GRS	47.45%
2nd	Anthony Krehmeier	PS	Anthony Krehmeier	PS	49.76%
3rd	Didier Jau	LE	Didier Jau	LE	44.48%
4th	Pierre Benarroche*	UG	Olivia Fortin	DVG	51.51%
5th	Anne-Marie d'Estienne d'Orves*	DVD	Eléonore Bez	RN	50.41%
6th	Sylvain Souvestre	LR	Olivier Rioult	RN	49.59%
7th	Marion Bareille	DVD	Tina Biard-Sansonetti	PS	50.89%
8th	Nadia Boulainseur*	DVG	Samia Ghali	DVG	46.07%
*not running for re-election

== See also ==
- 2026 French municipal elections
  - 2026 Lyon municipal election
  - 2026 Nancy municipal election
  - 2026 Nice municipal election
  - 2026 Paris municipal election
  - 2026 Toulouse municipal election
