= Olivier Fayssat =

French politician (born 1968)

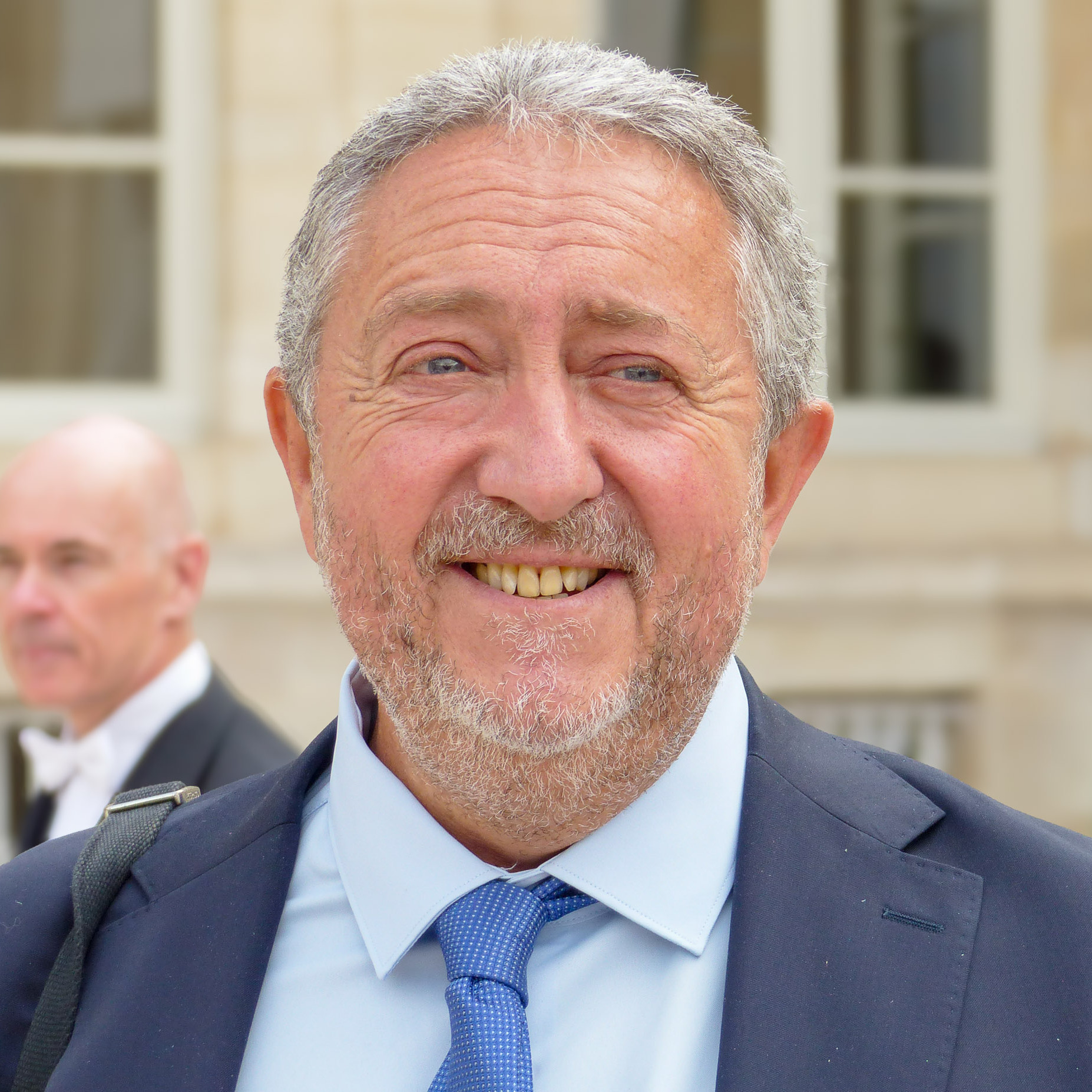

Member of the National Assembly for Bouches-du-Rhône's 6th constituency
- Incumbent
- Assumed office 8 July 2024
- Preceded by: Lionel Royer-Perreaut

Personal details
- Born: 24 March 1968 (age 58) Marseille, France
- Party: Union of the Right for the Republic (2024–present)
- Other political affiliations: The Republicans (until 2024)

Olivier Fayssat (French pronunciation: [ɔlivje fɛsa]; born 24 March 1968) is a French politician who has represented the 6th constituency of Bouches-du-Rhône in the National Assembly since 2024. A member of the Union of the Right for the Republic (UDR), he has also been a municipal councillor of Marseille since 2026, elected on the National Rally list led by Franck Allisio.
