= Dominique Tian =

French politician (born 1959)

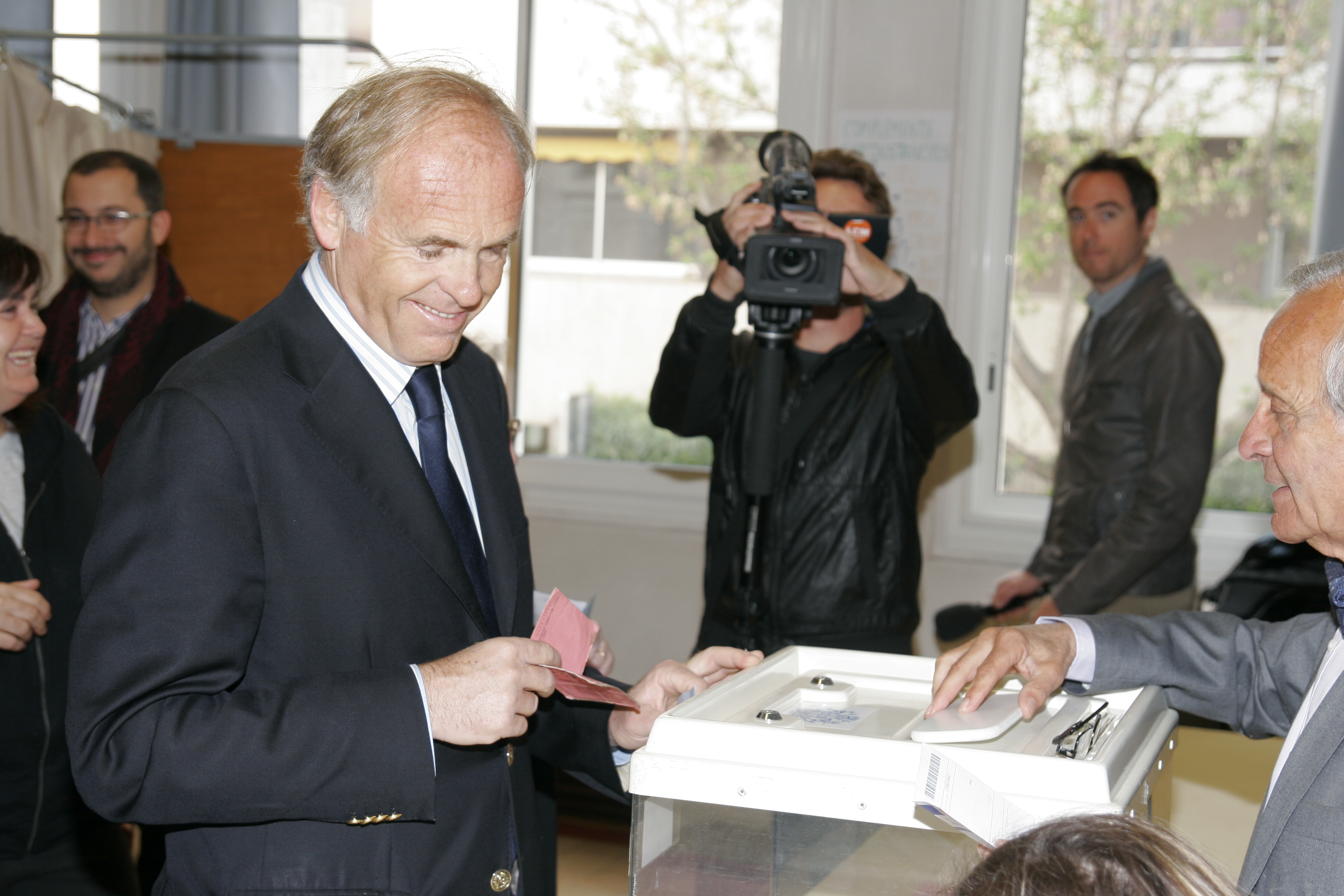
- Tian in 2012

Member of the National Assembly for Bouches-du-Rhône's 2nd constituency
- In office 19 July 2002 – 20 June 2017
- Preceded by: Jean-François Mattei
- Succeeded by: Claire Pitollat

Personal details
- Born: 14 December 1959 (age 66) Marseille, France
- Party: Union for French Democracy, Union for a Popular Movement, The Republicans
- Education: Sciences Po Aix
- Occupation: Businessman, politician

Dominique Tian (French pronunciation: [dɔminik tjɑ̃]; born 14 December 1959) is a French businessman and retired politician who represented the 2nd constituency of the Bouches-du-Rhône department in the National Assembly from 2002 to 2017. He has been member of The Republicans (LR) since the party was founded in 2015 as the successor to the Union for a Popular Movement (UMP). In the 2017 legislative election, Tian lost his seat in a "surprise" upset by Claire Pitollat of La République En Marche! (LREM), who was a first-time candidate.

Tian also held offices at the municipal and departmental level. He first served the member of the General Council of Bouches-du-Rhône for the canton of Marseille-Saint-Giniez from 1988 to 2002 as the successor of Jean-Claude Gaudin, before holding the mayorship of the 4th sector of Marseille, which encompasses the 6th and 8th arrondissements, from 1995 to 2013. Tian was later appointed First Deputy Mayor of Marseille under Mayor Gaudin from 2014 until 2020, succeeding Roland Blum. He retired from politics when he was succeeded by Socialist Benoît Payan as First Deputy Mayor under Mayor Michèle Rubirola following the 2020 municipal election.

== Tax evasion conviction ==
In 2018, Dominique Tian was found guilty by a Paris court in a tax evasion lawsuit. He was sentenced to a one-year suspended prison sentence. Tian filed an appeal and a new trial was ordered. In 2019, he was found guilty again and sentenced to a suspended prison sentence of 18 months.
