= Éléonore Bez =

French politician (born 1976)

Mayor of Marseille's 5th sector
- Incumbent
- Assumed office 5 april 2026
- Preceded by: Anne-Marie d’Estienne d’Orves

Personal details
- Born: 24 June 1976 (age 50) Paris, France
- Party: National Rally

Éléonore Bez (born 24 June 1976) is a French politician of the National Rally. On March 2026, she has been elected mayor of the 5th sector of Marseille, comprising the 9th and 10th municipal arrondissement of the city. She has also previously been a member of the Regional Council of Provence-Alpes-Côte d'Azur, the municipal council of Marseille, the metropolitan council of Aix-Marseille-Provence, and the arrondissement council of the 5th sector.

== Early life and career ==
Bez was born in Paris and has lived in Marseille since the age of 11. She joined the National Rally at the age of 18, and was elected to the Regional Council of Provence-Alpes-Côte d'Azur in the 2015 regional elections. She was a candidate for Bouches-du-Rhône's 6th constituency in the 2017 legislative election, and a candidate for member of the European Parliament in the 2019 European Parliament election.

In the 2020 municipal elections, Bez was elected municipal councillor of Marseille, as the lead candidate of the National Rally in the 5th sector. She was re-elected as regional councillor of Provence-Alpes-Côte d'Azur in the 2021 regional elections. Together with Franck Allisio, Gisèle Lelouis and Arezki Selloum, she left the National Rally's municipal council group in February 2022, in protest against group leader Stéphane Ravier's decision not to sanction councillor Sophie Grech over her support for Éric Zemmour in the 2022 presidential election. She was a candidate for Bouches-du-Rhône's 6th constituency in the 2022 legislative election, and a candidate for member of the European Parliament in the 2024 European Parliament election.

She became the mayor of the 5th sector after the 2026 municipal elections, winning 44.88 % of the votes in the first round and 50.41 % in the second.
