= Claire Pitollat =

French politician

Member of the National Assembly for Bouches-du-Rhône's 2nd constituency
- In office 21 June 2017 – 9 June 2024
- Preceded by: Dominique Tian
- Succeeded by: Laurent Lhardit

Personal details
- Born: 17 September 1979 (age 47) 7th arrondissement of Marseille, France
- Party: La République En Marche!
- Education: École nationale supérieure de l'aéronautique et de l'espace
- Occupation: Engineer, politician

Claire Pitollat (born 17 September 1979) is a French engineer and politician who has represented the 2nd constituency of the Bouches-du-Rhône department in the National Assembly from 2017 to 2024. A member of La République En Marche! (LREM), her constituency encompasses the 7th and 8th arrondissements of Marseille.

== Early life ==
Claire Pitollat was born and grew up in the 7th arrondissement of Marseille. She attended the school of La Roseraie, then the Lycée Montgrand. After studying physical science in Marseille, she graduated in Toulouse from the aeronautical engineering school SUPAERO. During this time, she also earned her private pilot's license.

== Political career ==
In the 2017 legislative election, she succeeded Dominique Tian of The Republicans (LR) in Parliament as a political newcomer. She was elected for La République En Marche! in the 2nd constituency of Bouches-du-Rhône with 54.7% of the vote in the second round. She joined the Committee on Social Affairs.

In September 2019, Pitollat was designated to hold one of the vice presidencies of the La République En Marche group in the National Assembly alongside Bénédicte Peyrol, but only remained in that position for a few months. In the 2020 municipal election in Marseille, she supported without result the establishment of an electoral alliance with The Republicans led by Martine Vassal.

In the 2022 legislative election, she was reelected with 61.6% of the second-round vote. In the 16th National Assembly under the Fifth Republic, she joined the Committee on Sustainable Development, Spatial and Regional Planning.

In 2024, she was defeated in the first round of that year’s snap elections.
