= Bouches-du-Rhône's 2nd constituency =

Constituency of the National Assembly of France

2nd constituency of Bouches-du-Rhône
- inline Constituency of the National Assembly of France

- Constituency in Bouches-du-Rhône Department (white area is the Étang de Berre lagoon)

- Bouches-du-Rhône in France
- Deputy: Laurent Lhardit; PS
- Department: Bouches-du-Rhône

The 2nd constituency of Bouches-du-Rhône is a French legislative constituency in Bouches-du-Rhône. The constituency covers the southern and residential coast of the city of Marseille.

== Boundaries ==
The constituency includes the following areas:

- 7th arrondissement of Marseille
- 8th arrondissement of Marseille

== Deputies ==
Election	Member	Party	Notes
1993	Jean-François Mattei	UDF	
1997	Jean-François Mattei	UDF	
2002	Dominique Tian	UMP	Tian replaced Mattei as deputy when Mattei was appointed to the government
2007	Dominique Tian	LR	
2012	Dominique Tian	LR	
2017	Claire Pitollat	LREM	
2022	Claire Pitollat	RE	
2024	Laurent Lhardit	PS	

== Elections ==
=== 2024 ===
Candidate	Party	Alliance	First round			Second round		
Candidate	Party	Alliance	Votes	%	+/–	Votes	%	+/–
Olivier Rioult	RN		18,836	32.06	+15.77	24,789	46.36	new
Laurent Lhardit	PS	NFP	16,740	28.49	+3.42	28,677	53.64	+15.28
Claire Pitollat	REN	Ensemble	15,870	27.01	-2.84	withdrew		
Laure-Agnès Caradec	LR	UDC	5,100	8.68	-4.38			
Jean-Marc Graffeo	REC		1,130	1.92	-6.72			
Hugo Roche Poggi	DVG		847	1.44	new			
Claudine Rodinson	LO		229	0.39	-0.15			
Votes			58,752	100.00		53,466	100.00	
Valid votes			58,752	98.63	+0.02	53,466	92.55	-0.62
Blank votes			585	0.98	-0.01	3,617	6.26	+1.30
Null votes			230	0.39	=	684	1.18	-0.69
Turnout			59,567	70.54	+21.68	57,767	68.39	+22.56
Abstentions			24,873	29.46	-21.68	26,694	31.61	-22.56
Registered voters			84,440			84,461		
Result			PS GAIN FROM RE					

=== 2022 ===
Legislative Election 2022: Bouches-du-Rhône's 2nd constituency
Party	Candidate	Votes	%	±%
LREM (Ensemble)	Claire Pitollat	12,026	29.85	-6.64
EELV (NUPÉS)	Alexandre Rupnik	10,101	25.07	+4.48
RN	Clémence Parodi	6,561	16.29	+3.56
LR (UDC)	Sabine Bernasconi	5,262	13.06	−12.16
REC	Jean-Marc Graffeo	3,480	8.64	N/A
DVE	Dominique Surry	943	2.34	N/A
Others	N/A	1,912		
Turnout		40,851	48.86	−1.77
2nd round result
LREM (Ensemble)	Claire Pitollat	22,005	61.64	+6.87
EELV (NUPÉS)	Alexandre Rupnik	13,697	38.36	N/A
Turnout		35,702	45.83	+3.66
LREM hold				

=== 2017 ===
Candidate	Label	First round		Second round	
Candidate	Label	Votes	%	Votes	%
Claire Pitollat	REM	14,372	36.49	16,725	54.77
Dominique Tian	LR	9,933	25.22	13,814	45.23
Caroline Sicard	FN	5,012	12.73		
Ariane Gil	FI	4,124	10.47		
Christine Juste	ECO	1,532	3.89		
Annie Levy-Mozziconacci	PS	1,326	3.37		
Audrey Garino	PCF	1,128	2.86		
Dominique Surry	ECO	572	1.45		
Bernadette Monetto	DLF	547	1.39		
Michèle Carayon	EXD	240	0.61		
Natacha Cetri	DIV	200	0.51		
Mohamed Mosbah	ECO	142	0.36		
Brigitte Espaze	EXG	113	0.29		
Sylvie Giovannini	REG	92	0.23		
Sacha Guerbe	DIV	46	0.12		
Jean Gautier	DIV	4	0.01		
Sébastien Peretti	DIV	0	0.00		
Votes		39,383	100.00	30,539	100.00
Valid votes		39,383	98.79	30,539	92.01
Blank votes		372	0.93	2,006	6.04
Null votes		110	0.28	646	1.95
Turnout		39,865	50.63	33,191	42.17
Abstentions		38,867	49.37	45,523	57.83
Registered voters		78,732		78,714	
Source: Ministry of the Interior

=== 2012 ===
Summary of the 10 June and 17 June 2012 French legislative election in Bouches-du-Rhône’s 2nd Constituency
Candidate	Party		1st round		2nd round	
Candidate	Party		Votes	%	Votes	%
Dominique Tian	Union for a Popular Movement	UMP	18,602	41.06%	23,771	58.46%
Jean-Pierre Mignard	Socialist Party	PS	13,138	29.00%	16,891	41.54%
Alexandre Bartolini	National Front	FN	8,083	17.84%		
Christian Pellicani	Left Front	FG	3,029	6.69%		
Florence Bistagne		CEN	1,064	2.35%		
Dominique Surry	Ecologist	ECO	531	1.17%		
Pierre-Marie Sanson	Ecologist	ECO	287	0.63%		
Louis Jacques Di Stefano	Miscellaneous Right	DVD	234	0.52%		
Marie Contaux	Far Left	EXG	133	0.29%		
Patricia Dupuy	The Greens	VEC	112	0.25%		
Brigitte Espaze	Far Left	EXG	96	0.21%		
Total			45,309	100%	40,662	100%
Registered voters			77,390		77,369	
Blank/Void ballots			371	0.81%	1,224	2.92%
Turnout			45,680	59.03%	41,886	54.14%
Abstentions			31,710	40.97%	35,483	45.86%
Result					UMP HOLD	

=== 2007 ===
Results of the 10 June and 17 June 2007 French legislative election in Bouches-du-Rhône’s 2nd Constituency
Party	Candidate	Votes	%	±%
UMP	Dominique Tian	22,108	57.02	
PS	Nathalie Pigamo	6,879	17.74	
MoDem	Anne Claudius Petit	3,159	8.15	
FN	Bernard Marandat	2,097	5.41	
PCF	Marie-Françoise Palloix	1,272	3.28	
LV	Michèle Poncet Ramade	1,034	2.67	
Far left	Dominique Cardon	704	1.82	
DVE	Marcelle Teychene	455	1.17	
MPF	Arezki Selloum	252	0.65	
Far right	Gabriel Van Gaver	222	0.57	
Independent	Françoise Montigny	191	0.49	
Far left	François Roche	187	0.48	
DVE	Conception Denia Salone	93	0.24	
DVD	Alain Assouad	80	0.21	
DVD	Eliane Boudara	42	0.11	
Independent	Marie Prost	0	0.00	
Majority		15,229	39.28	
Turnout		39,129	59.91	
UMP hold		Swing		

=== 2002 ===
Legislative Election 2002: Bouches-du-Rhône's 2nd constituency
Party	Candidate	Votes	%	±%
UMP	Jean-François Mattei	21,312	54.88	
PS	Francis Allouch	7,839	20.19	
FN	Delphine Chomard	5,825	15.00	
PCF	Marie-Françoise Palloix	1,275	3.28	
Others	N/A	2,165		
Turnout		39,228	67.17	
UMP gain from UDF				

=== 1997 ===
Legislative Election 1997: Bouches-du-Rhône's 2nd constituency
Party	Candidate	Votes	%	±%
UDF	Jean-François Mattei	14,388	40.88	
FN	Hubert Savon	7,359	20.91	
PS	Francis Allouch	6,813	19.36	
PCF	Marie-Françoise Palloix	2,921	8.30	
LV	Jean-Pierre Fouquet	923	2.62	
DVD	André Thion	831	2.36	
Others	N/A	1,960		
Turnout		36,174	63.34	
2nd round result
UDF	Jean-François Mattei	26,608	79.24	
FN	Hubert Savon	6,973	20.76	
Turnout		36,931	64.67	
UDF hold				
