= Samia Ghali =

French politician (born 1968)

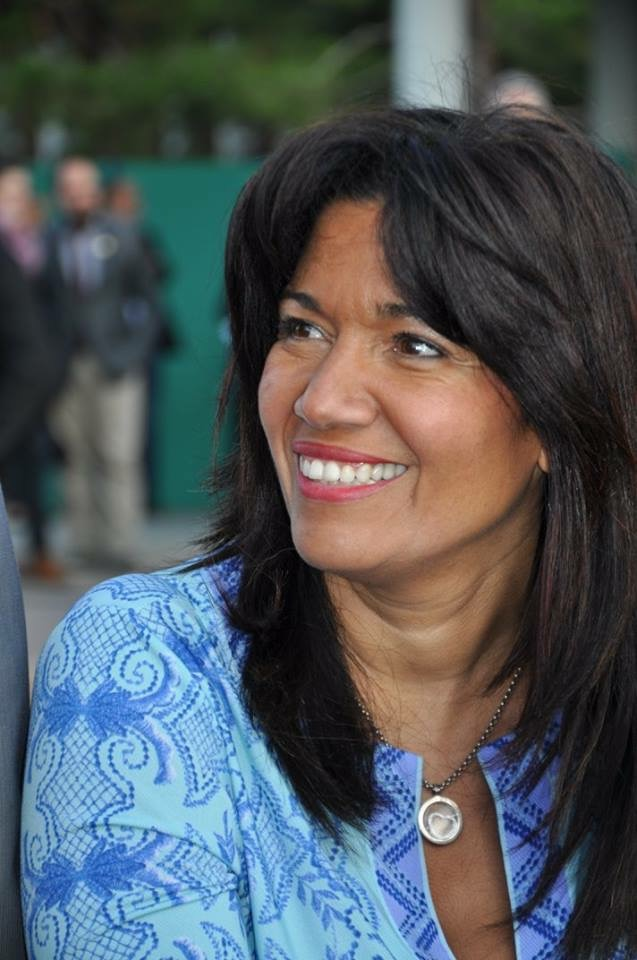
- Ghali in 2016

Senator for Bouches-du-Rhône
- In office 1 October 2008 – 3 August 2020

Personal details
- Born: 10 June 1968 (age 57) Marseille, France
- Party: Socialist Party
- Spouse: Franck Dumontel
- Children: 4

Samia Ghali (French: [samja ɡali], Arabic: [ˈsaːmijaː ˈɣaːliː]; born 10 June 1968) is a French politician who served as a Senator for Bouches-du-Rhône from 2008 to 2020. A member of the Socialist Party (PS), she also held the mayorship of the 8th sector of Marseille, which comprises the 15th and 16th arrondissements, from 2008 to 2017. Ghali, who has been a deputy to successive Marseille Mayors Michèle Rubirola and Benoît Payan since 2020, has also held a seat in the Departmental Council of Bouches-du-Rhône since 2021.

== Early life ==
Samia Ghali was born on 10 June 1968 in Marseille, Southern France. She grew up in Bassens and Campagne Lévêque, two council estates in Marseille, where she was raised by her Algerian-born grandparents.

She received a Certificat d'Aptitude Professionnelle (CAP), or professional certificate, as a secretary and accountant.

== Career ==
Ghali became active in politics at the age of 16. She was elected to the municipal council of Marseille in 2001.

In 2008, she was elected to the Senate for Bouches-du-Rhône. She held her seat until 2020, when she resigned upon her appointment as second Deputy Mayor of Marseille under Mayor Michèle Rubirola. Ghali also served as the 8th sector mayor of Marseille (15th and 16th arrondissements).

In 2012, she suggested the French Army should be sent to the neighbourhoods of Northern Marseille to put an end to drug-trafficking. In June 2015, her own chauffeur was arrested by police in a drug-trafficking raid in La Castellane. She said she was "shocked" and "astounded".

In the 2020 municipal election, Ghali ran for Mayor of Marseille, though the Socialist Party's official stance was to support the Printemps marseillais ("Marseille Spring") coalition headed by Europe Ecology – The Greens candidate Michèle Rubirola. Benoît Payan, the city's Socialist leader, accused Ghali of splitting the left-wing vote. Later that year, after Rubirola's resignation from the mayorship, Ghali's contingent of eight councillors voted in favour of First Deputy Mayor Payan becoming the new mayor.

From 2004 to 2008, Ghali also held one of the vice-presidencies of the Regional Council of Provence-Alpes-Côte d'Azur under President Michel Vauzelle. Since 2021, she has been a member of the Departmental Council of Bouches-du-Rhône for the canton of Marseille-4.

== Personal life ==
Her second husband is Franck Dumontel, a political administrator. She has four children.
