= Bruno Gilles =

French politician (born 1960)

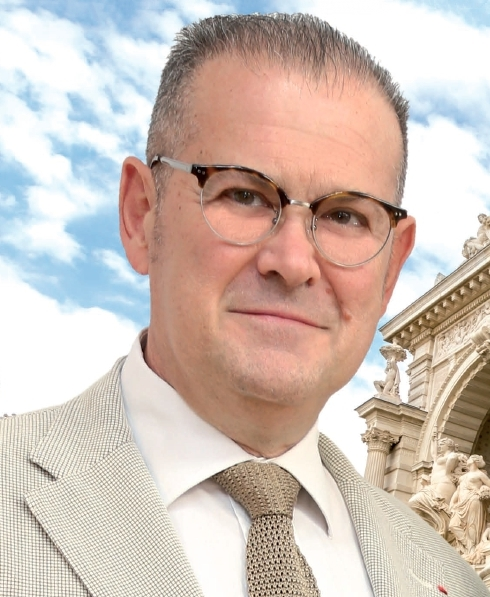

Senator for Bouches-du-Rhône
- In office 1 October 2008 – 30 September 2020

Member of the National Assembly for Bouches-du-Rhône's 5th constituency
- In office 19 July 2002 – 19 June 2007
- Preceded by: Renaud Muselier
- Succeeded by: Renaud Muselier

Personal details
- Born: 26 December 1960 (age 65) Marseille, France
- Party: Rally for the Republic (1979–2002); Union for a Popular Movement (2002–2015); The Republicans (2015–2019); Horizons (2021–present)

Bruno Gilles (French pronunciation: [bʁyno ʒil]; born 26 December 1960) is a French politician who represented the Bouches-du-Rhône department in the Senate from 2008 to 2020. A former member of The Republicans, he joined Horizons in 2021. Gilles previously served as the member of the National Assembly for the 5th constituency of Bouches-du-Rhône from 2002 to 2007.

== Political career ==
Gilles held the mayorship of the 3rd sector of Marseille, which encompasses the 4th and 5th arrondissements, from 1995 to 2017. He was first elected to the municipal council of Marseille in 1995. In 2020, he was named 3rd sector honorary mayor by the prefect of Bouches-du-Rhône.

Gilles entered Parliament in 2002 as Renaud Muselier's substitute. He finished his term in the 12th National Assembly. In 2008, he was elected to the Senate on the Union for a Popular Movement list led by Marseille Mayor Jean-Claude Gaudin.

From 2016 to 2020, Gilles served as chair of The Republicans in Bouches-du-Rhône. Ahead of The Republicans 2016 presidential primary, he endorsed Nicolas Sarkozy as the party's candidate for the 2017 French presidential election. Amid the Fillon affair, in March 2017, he publicly called on François Fillon to withdraw as the party's candidate in the election.

In the party's 2017 leadership election, Gilles later endorsed Laurent Wauquiez. He left the party in 2019.

Since 2022, Gilles has been leading Édouard Philippe's Horizons party in Marseille.

== Personal life ==
Gilles received a heart transplant in 2017.
