= Lionel Royer-Perreaut =

French politician (born 1972)

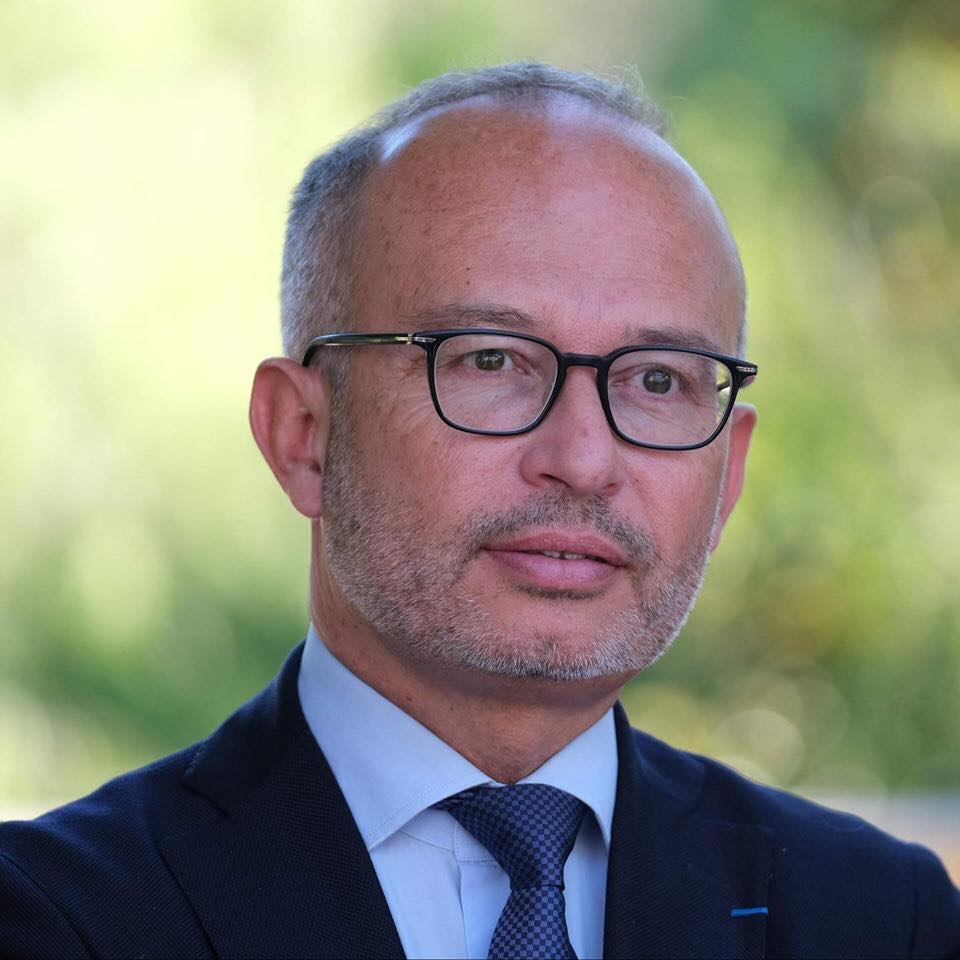

Member of the National Assembly for Bouches-du-Rhône's 6th constituency
- In office 22 June 2022 – 9 June 2024
- Preceded by: Guy Teissier
- Succeeded by: Olivier Fayssat

Personal details
- Born: 13 November 1972 (age 53) Toulon, France
- Party: Renaissance (since 2022)
- Other political affiliations: The Republicans (2015–2022); Union for a Popular Movement (2002–2015); Union for French Democracy (1993–2002); Republican Party (until 1993)
- Education: IHEDN

Lionel Royer-Perreaut (born 13 November 1972) is a French politician who served as a Member of Parliament for Bouches-du-Rhône's 6th constituency in the National Assembly from 2022 to 2024.

== Political positions ==
Royer-Perreaut is considered to be part of his parliamentary group's conservative wing.

== See also ==
- List of deputies of the 16th National Assembly of France
