= Bouches-du-Rhône's 12th constituency =

Constituency of the National Assembly of France

12th constituency of Bouches-du-Rhône
- inline Constituency of the National Assembly of France

- Constituency in Bouches-du-Rhône Department (white area is the Étang de Berre lagoon)

- Bouches-du-Rhône in France
- Deputy: Franck Allisio; RN
- Department: Bouches-du-Rhône

The 12th constituency of Bouches-du-Rhône is a French legislative constituency in Bouches-du-Rhône.

== Deputies ==
Election	Member	Party
2002	Éric Diard	UMP
2007	Éric Diard	UMP
2012	Vincent Burroni	PS
2017	Éric Diard	LR
2022	Franck Allisio	RN
2024	Franck Allisio	RN

== Elections ==
=== 2024 ===
Candidate	Party	Alliance	First round			Second round		
Candidate	Party	Alliance	Votes	%	+/–	Votes	%	+/–
Franck Allisio	RN		33,086	54.07	+17.79			
Maryline Czurka	PS	NFP	14,746	24.10	+4.98			
Axel Breton	MoDEM	Ensemble	8,508	13.90	new			
Maxime Aghemo	LR	UDC	3,456	5.65	-24.13			
Raymonde Zini	REC		836	1.37	-4.76			
François Roche	LO		561	0.92	+0.15			
Votes			61,193	100.00				
Valid votes			61,193	97.41	-0.26			
Blank votes			1,296	2.06	+0.19			
Null votes			330	0.53	+0.07			
Turnout			62,819	65.87	+24.39			
Abstentions			32,546	34.13	-24.39			
Registered voters			95,365					
Result			RN HOLD					

=== 2022 ===
Legislative Election 2022: Bouches-du-Rhône's 12th constituency
Party	Candidate	Votes	%	±%
RN	Franck Allisio	13,921	36.28	+14.42
LR (UDC)	Éric Diard	11,429	29.78	+5.13
LFI (NUPÉS)	Isabelle Chauvin	7,339	19.12	−1.14
REC	Jacques Clostermann	2,351	6.13	N/A
DVE	Audrey Castanet	1,298	3.38	N/A
Others	N/A	2,037		
Turnout		39,291	41.48	−2.51
2nd round result
RN	Franck Allisio	19,175	51.37	N/A
LR (UDC)	Éric Diard	18,154	48.63	−13.50
Turnout		37,329	41.57	+4.92
RN gain from LR				

=== 2017 ===
Candidate	Label	First round		Second round	
Candidate	Label	Votes	%	Votes	%
Éric Diard	LR	9,819	24.65	18,861	62.13
Camille Bal	REM	9,428	23.67	11,496	37.87
Jean-Lin Lacapelle	FN	8,706	21.86		
Damien Merono	FI	4,044	10.15		
Jacques Clostermann	EXD	1,892	4.75		
Laurence Jouanaud	PCF	1,734	4.35		
Isabelle Rovarino	PS	1,263	3.17		
Nathalie Sirben	ECO	1,031	2.59		
Angela Lavergne	ECO	606	1.52		
Gérard Faissal	DLF	513	1.29		
Fat Derdour	DIV	290	0.73		
Virginie Petiot	DIV	193	0.48		
Jean-Yves Rosiod	DIV	157	0.39		
François Roche	EXG	152	0.38		
Votes		39,828	100.00	30,357	100.00
Valid votes		39,828	98.24	30,357	89.89
Blank votes		589	1.45	2,747	8.13
Null votes		124	0.31	668	1.98
Turnout		40,541	43.99	33,772	36.65
Abstentions		51,617	56.01	58,386	63.35
Registered voters		92,158		92,158	
Source: Ministry of the Interior

=== 2012 ===
Summary of the 10 June and 17 June 2012 French legislative election in Bouches-du-Rhône’s 12th Constituency
Candidate	Party		1st round		2nd round	
Candidate	Party		Votes	%	Votes	%
Vincent Burroni	Socialist Party	PS	13,597	27.36%	18,754	37.34%
Éric Diard	Union for a Popular Movement	UMP	13,968	28.11%	18,381	36.60%
Paul Cupolati	Front National	FN	13,257	26.68%	13,089	26.06%
Jean-Claude Labranche	Left Front	FG	3,528	7.10%		
Patrick Viloria	Miscellaneous Right	DVD	2,311	4.65%		
Pierre Souvent	Europe Ecology – The Greens	EELV	1,291	2.60%		
Alde Vinci	Far Right	EXD	455	0.92%		
Jérôme Ravenet	Ecologist	ECO	439	0.88%		
Corinne Avedissian	Ecologist	ECO	326	0.66%		
André Boye	Miscellaneous Right	DVD	237	0.48%		
François Roche	Far Left	EXG	190	0.38%		
Faouzi Djedou-Benabid	Other	AUT	84	0.17%		
Benjamin Durand	Miscellaneous Left	DVG	14	0.03%		
Total			49,697	100%	50,224	100%
Registered voters			89,006		89,006	
Blank/Void ballots			668	1.33%	776	1.52%
Turnout			50,365	56.59%	51,000	57.30%
Abstentions			38,641	43.41%	38,006	42.70%
Result					PS GAIN FROM UMP	

=== 2007 ===
Results of the 10 June and 17 June 2007 French legislative election in Bouches-du-Rhône’s 12th Constituency
Party	Candidate	Votes	%	±%
UMP	Éric Diard	30,069	50.49	
PS	Jean-Claude Denjean	12,974	21.78	
FN	Gérald Gerin	4,398	7.38	
PCF	Suzanne Catelin	3,350	5.62	
MoDem	William Carrulla	2,776	4.66	
Far left	Christophe Barnier	1,235	2.07	
MNR	Bruno Mégret	1,212	2.03	
LV	Julien Zloch	909	1.53	
DVE	Christophe Pistoresi	805	1.35	
CPNT	Marie-Laure Scifo	598	1.00	
DIV	Saïd Merabti	442	0.74	
Far left	Christian Lecat	322	0.54	
DIV	Jean-Claude Ruder	279	0.47	
DIV	Jean-Claude Marie	135	0.23	
DVD	Patrick Richard	55	0.09	
Majority		17,095	28.71	
Turnout		60,727	55.67	
UMP hold		Swing		

=== 2002 ===
Legislative Election 2002: Bouches-du-Rhône's 12th constituency
Party	Candidate	Votes	%	±%
PS	Vincent Burroni	17,455	28.42	
UMP	Éric Diard	15,882	25.86	
MNR	Bruno Mégret	11,412	18.58	
FN	Claude Bourge	8,139	13.25	
Others	N/A	8,520		
Turnout		62,733	62.71	
2nd round result
UMP	Éric Diard	29,457	55.23	
PS	Vincent Burroni	23,879	44.77	
Turnout		56,388	56.37	
UMP gain from PS				

=== 1997 ===
Legislative Election 1997: Bouches-du-Rhône's 12th constituency
Party	Candidate	Votes	%	±%
FN	Bruno Mégret	22,353	35.45	
PS	Henri d'Attilio	19,558	31.02	
RPR	Christian-René Rossi	8,203	13.01	
PCF	Alain Hayot	6,860	10.88	
GE	Christine Paredes	1,852	2.94	
Others	N/A	4,126		
Turnout		65,110	70.88	
2nd round result
PS	Henri d'Attilio	35,276	54.11	
FN	Bruno Mégret	29,921	45.89	
Turnout		69,096	75.23	
PS gain from RPR				
