= Jean-François Mattei =

French doctor and politician

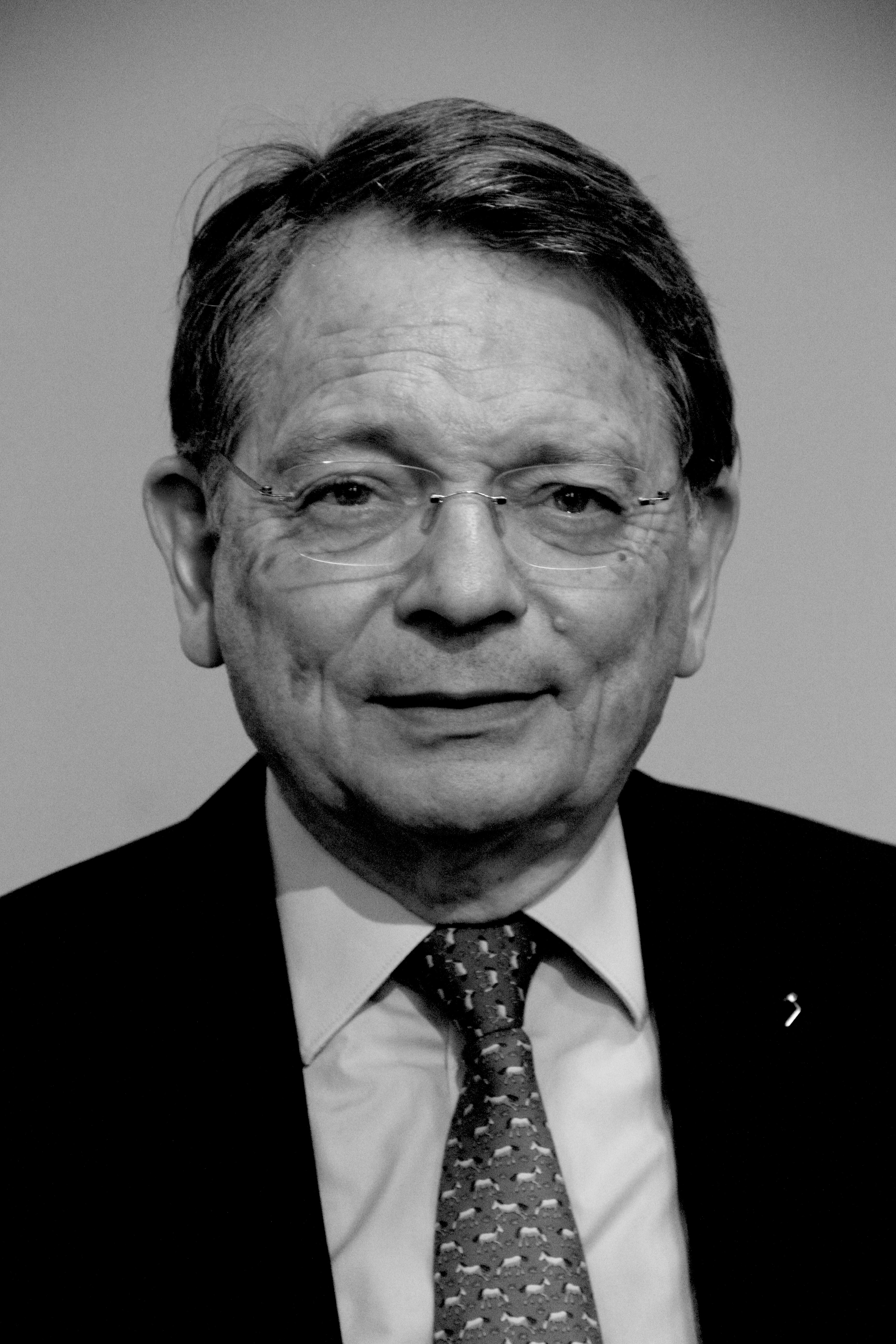
- Mattei in 2013

Minister of Health
- In office 2002–2004
- President: Jacques Chirac
- Prime Minister: Jean-Pierre Raffarin
- Preceded by: Bernard Kouchner
- Succeeded by: Philippe Douste-Blazy

Member of the National Assembly for Bouches-du-Rhône's 2nd constituency
- In office 1989–2002
- Preceded by: Jean-Claude Gaudin
- Succeeded by: Dominique Tian

Personal details
- Born: 14 January 1943 (age 83) Lyon, France
- Party: UMP
- Profession: Physician

Jean-François Mattei (born 14 January 1943) is a French doctor and politician.

== Medical career ==
Jean-François Mattei is a professor of pediatrics and genetics. He served as the director of Genetics at the teaching hospital of Marseilles. He was an advisor of the Comité consultatif national d'éthique (CCNE) until 1997, and has been a titular member of the French Académie Nationale de Médecine since June 2000. He was also the president of the French Red Cross until 22 June 2013.

== Elected positions ==
On 4 December 1989, he was elected to the second district of Bouches-du-Rhône, replacing Jean-Claude Gaudin, who had been elected to the Senate; he was then re-elected to this position in 1993, 1997, and 2002. Dominique Tian replaced him in 2007. Since 1983 he has been a councillor of the municipality of Marseille, and a regional advisor for Provence-Alpes-Côte d'Azur. Mattei originally belonged to the Union for French Democracy (UDF), and was elected chairman of the Liberal Democracy and Independents (DLI) when it split from the UDF in October 2000. Later he joined Union for a Popular Movement (UMP).

== Role in 2003 heat wave ==
Mattei served as health minister during the 2003 European heat wave, in which over 11000 French people, mostly elderly, died of heat-related illnesses.

== Honors and Awards ==
Knight of the Order of Legion of Honour
