= Sophie Camard =

French politician (born 1972)

Mayor of the 1st sector of Marseille
- Incumbent
- Assumed office 4 July 2020
- Preceded by: Sabine Bernasconi

Personal details
- Born: 9 December 1972 (age 53)
- Party: LFI (since 2017); GRS
- Other political affiliations: LV (2007–2010); LE (2010–2017)

Sophie Camard (born 9 December 1972) is a French politician of La France insoumise. Since 2020, she has served as mayor of the 1st sector of Marseille, consisting of the 1st and 7th arrondissements. In the 2021 departmental elections, she was elected member of the Departmental Council of Bouches-du-Rhône. She was a member of the Regional Council of Provence-Alpes-Côte d'Azur from 2010 to 2015, and was the lead candidate of the Left Front in the 2015 regional election. From 2017 to 2022, she was the substitute for Jean-Luc Mélenchon. In the 2024 European Parliament election, she was a candidate for member of the European Parliament.
