= Franck Allisio =

French politician (born 1980)

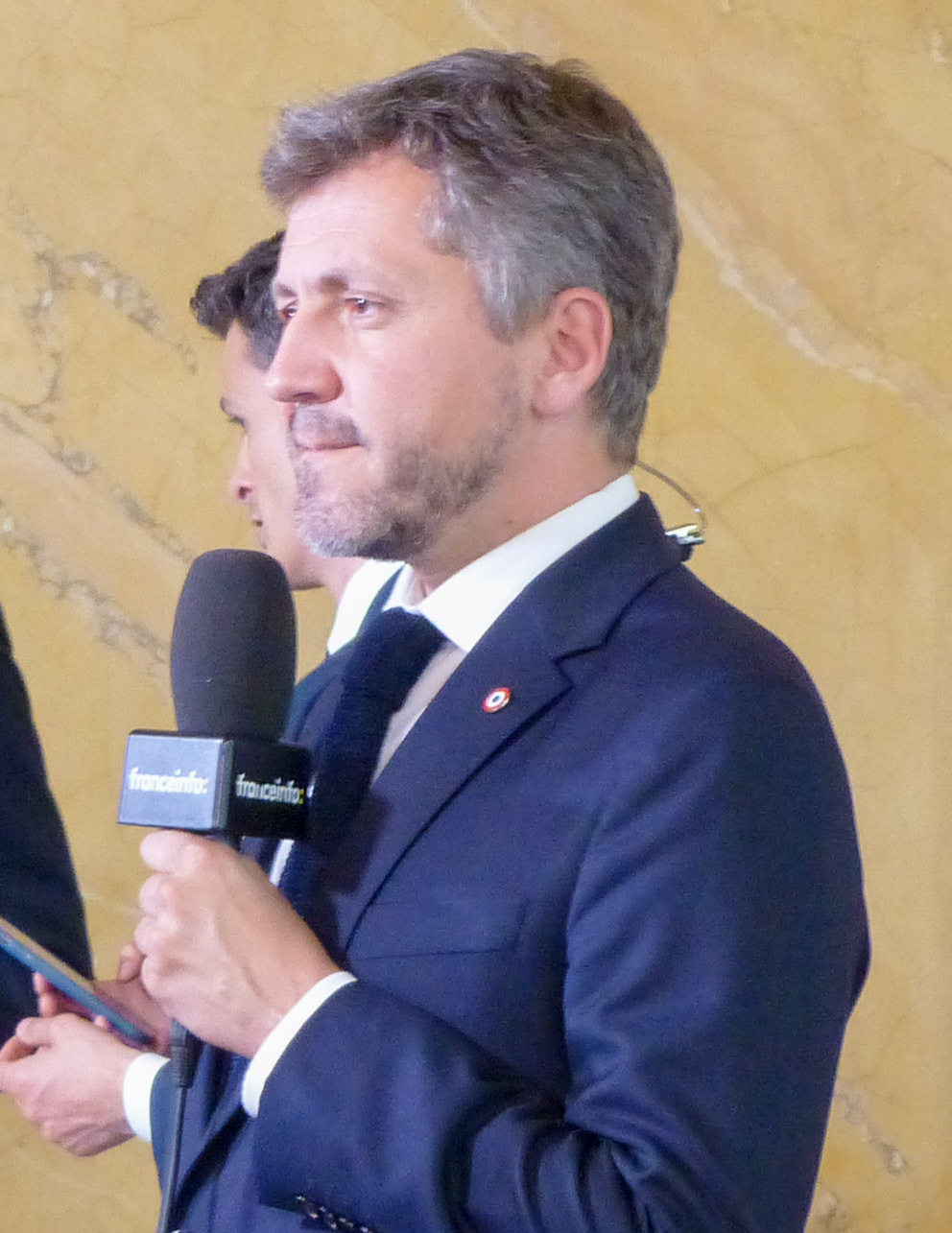
- Allisio in 2024

Member of the National Assembly for Bouches-du-Rhône's 12th constituency
- Incumbent
- Assumed office 22 June 2022
- Preceded by: Éric Diard

Member of the Regional Council of Provence-Alpes-Côte d'Azur
- Incumbent
- Assumed office 4 January 2016
- President: Renaud Muselier

Municipal councillor of Marseille
- Incumbent
- Assumed office 28 March 2026
- In office 28 June 2020 – 28 August 2022
- Constituency: 6th sector

Personal details
- Born: 4 August 1980 (age 46) Marseille, France
- Party: Union for a Popular Movement (2002–2015); The Republicans (2015); National Rally (2015–present)
- Relations: Monique Griseti (aunt)
- Education: Aix-Marseille University; Paris 2 Panthéon-Assas University

Franck Allisio (French pronunciation: [fʁɑ̃k alizjo]; born 4 August 1980) is a French politician who has represented the 12th constituency of the Bouches-du-Rhône department in the National Assembly since 2022. A member of the National Rally (RN), he was a candidate for Mayor of Marseille in 2026.

== Biography ==
Franck Allisio was born in Marseille. After his law and political science studies, he worked in Roger Karoutchi's cabinet as press relations manager before joining Nathalie Kosciusko-Morizet's cabinet. In 2012, he became an assistant to MP Pierre Lellouche.

National president of the "Jeunes actifs" movement of The Republicans, he announced on 13 September 2015 in Marseille that he would join the National Front (later National Rally).

Allisio was appointed spokesperson for Marion Maréchal-Le Pen's regional campaign in Provence-Alpes-Côte d'Azur later in 2015. He was elected to the Regional Council of Provence-Alpes-Côte d'Azur for Bouches-du-Rhône.

In 2017, Allisio ran for the National Assembly and obtained just under 20% of the vote in the first round in the 1st constituency of Bouches-du-Rhône in Marseille. In 2020, he was elected a municipal councillor of Marseille in the 6th sector (11th and 12th arrondissements).

Ahead of the 2022 presidential election, Allisio was part of Marine Le Pen's campaign team. In the 2022 legislative election, he ran again for the National Assembly, this time in Bouches-du-Rhône's 12th constituency, which comprises the Marseille northwestern suburbs of Marignane and Vitrolles. Allisio, the party leader in Bouches-du-Rhône, defeated incumbent The Republicans MP Éric Diard with 51.3% of the vote.

In Parliament, he sits on the Committee on Finance. He was re-elected in the 2024 election with 54% of the first-round vote.

Ahead of the 2026 Marseille municipal election, Allisio announced his candidacy for the mayorship in June 2025 with the support of the Union of the Right for the Republic. In January 2026 Reconquête announced its support for Allisio as well. He focused his campaign on law and order issues, in response to drug-related crime in the city.

== Publication ==
- L'Union Européenne est morte. Vive l'Europe ! ISBN 9782841913688
