= Benoît Payan =

French politician (born 1978)

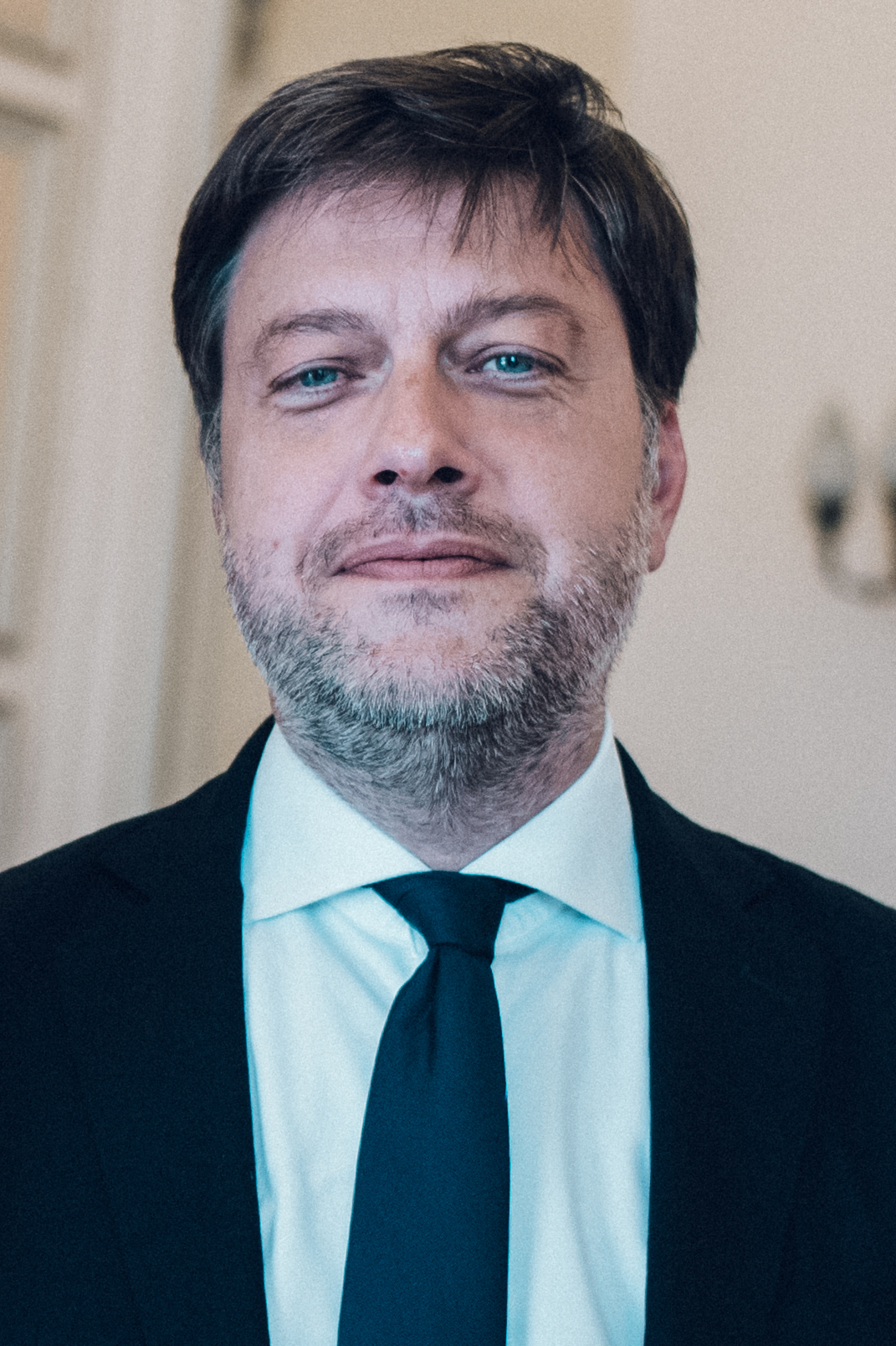
- Payan in 2025

Mayor of Marseille
- Incumbent
- Assumed office 15 December 2020 (Note: Acting: 15–21 December 2020)
- Preceded by: Michèle Rubirola

Personal details
- Born: Benoît Daniel Payan; 31 January 1978 (age 48) Marseille, France
- Party: Miscellaneous left
- Other political affiliations: Socialist (until 2020)

Benoît Daniel Payan ([bənwa pajɑ̃]; born 31 January 1978) is a French politician who has served as Mayor of Marseille since 2020. He was a member of the Socialist Party (PS) until 2020, since which he has stood for the miscellaneous left.

== Early life ==
Payan was born and raised in the Pont-de-Vivaux neighbourhood in the 10th arrondissement of Marseille. He is of Italian origin, and the son of a carpenter father and civil servant mother. During his studies to become a notary, he joined the Young Socialist Movement.

== Career ==
Payan served as an adviser to Michel Vauzelle when he was President of the Regional Council of Provence-Alpes-Côte d'Azur, then to Marie-Arlette Carlotti when she served in government (2012–2014).

Elected a municipal councillor in 2014 for the 3rd sector (4th and 5th arrondissements), Payan became leader of the Socialist group in the municipal council in 2016, then the main opposition group to Mayor Jean-Claude Gaudin's conservative administration. In 2015, he was also elected to the Departmental Council of Bouches-du-Rhône for the canton of Marseille-1 alongside Michèle Rubirola, a position he was reelected to in 2021.

In July 2019, Payan was one of the founders of Printemps marseillais ("Marseille Spring"), a broad left-wing electoral alliance seeking to end Gaudin's quarter-century in office in the 2020 election. He criticised the candidacy of Socialist dissenter Samia Ghali, believing it could divide the vote and hand victory to the right by default.

Payan's coalition won the election in July, installing Europe Ecology – The Greens member Michèle Rubirola as Marseille's first woman and Green mayor. Payan was reelected a municipal councillor, this time for the 2nd sector (2nd and 3rd arrondissements). Rubirola unexpectedly resigned on 15 December 2020, citing health reasons, transferring roles with Payan, her first deputy. On 21 December he was officially voted into office, with support from Ghali's eight councillors and without competition from the right.

In January 2023, Payan confirmed that he was no longer a member of the Socialist Party. This emerged when he stated he was ineligible to vote for any candidate for First Secretary of the party.

On 29 January 2025, Payan was named a knight of the Legion of Honour. The official statement recognised "22 years of service".

Payan was re-elected in the 2026 municipal election. He rejected an alliance with La France Insoumise (LFI) and won a three-way second round against the National Rally (RN) candidate Franck Allisio with 40% and Martine Vassal of the miscellaneous right on 5.4%.

During the 2026 French student protests, which included forced entry into Marseille's Hôtel de Ville, Payan called for rioters to be held accountable. He said that he had contacted the president, prime minister and interior minister, and considered the placement of one Compagnies Républicaines de Sécurité group of riot police to be insufficient for the size of the city. He announced financial aid for affected businesses.

== Policies ==
Payan supports the city selling the Stade Vélodrome football stadium, but only to its tenants, Olympique de Marseille. He has criticised the environmental impact of cruise liners on Marseille, and in 2024 he promised to enact France's strictest regulation of Airbnb in reaction to housing shortages.

While in opposition, Payan collected 10,000 signatures against a public–private partnership plan to spend €1 billion demolishing and rebuilding over 30 primary schools. In 2017, he led calls for ancient Greek remnants of Massalia to be preserved instead of a commercial building being built over them; the ruins were recognised as a monument historique the following year.

In July 2024, Payan made headlines for instructing Olympique de Marseille president Pablo Longoria not to sign Mason Greenwood, an English player who had been charged but not convicted of crimes of violence against women. Despite this, the club went on to sign Greenwood later that month.

Under Payan, Marseille entered a sister city agreement with Bethlehem in the West Bank, on the day that France recognised Palestine in September 2025. He had previously been criticised by some on the local left for maintaining such an agreement with the Israeli city of Haifa; he said that Haifa was a working-class city in which people protested against Benjamin Netanyahu and the Gaza war.
