= Bompard, Marseille =

Coastal quarter of Marseille, France

Coordinates: 43°16′52″N 5°21′43″E

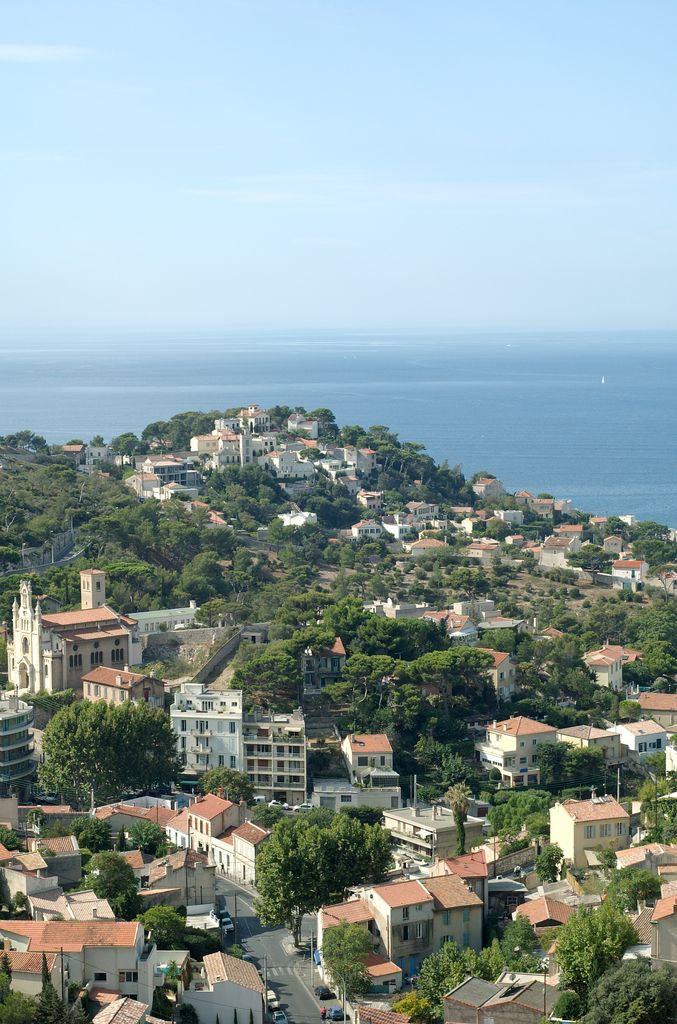
View of part of the 7th arrondissement (Bompard, Endoume, Roucas-Blanc) of Marseille, with the Mediterranean Sea in the background.

Bompard (French pronunciation: [bɔ̃paʁ]) is a quarter (French: quartier) in the 7th arrondissement of Marseille, France. According to the 2012 INSEE census, it had a population of 4,220.

== Overview ==
Bompard is located close to the Mediterranean Sea. It belongs to a part of the Massif de la Garde, which is a limestone hill on whose top is the church of Notre-Dame de la Garde, which is not, however, in Bompard. In the hills there are numerous caves. The local economy and culture are strongly influenced by the coastal setting. The fishing industry has always played an important role, and it is operated from the fishing port of Le Prophète. There is also a yacht club in Bompard.

The area is characterised by a particularly high number of cafés and restaurants. Major cultural institutions include a cinema opened in 1912 and Théâtre Silvain, inaugurated in 1923, not far from the centre of the Endoume quarter.
