= Éric Diard =

French politician (born 1965)

Member of the National Assembly for Bouches-du-Rhône's 12th constituency
- In office 21 June 2017 – 21 June 2022
- Preceded by: Vincent Burroni
- Succeeded by: Franck Allisio
- In office 19 June 2002 – 19 June 2012
- Preceded by: Vincent Burroni
- Succeeded by: Vincent Burroni

Mayor of Sausset-les-Pins
- In office 19 March 2001 – 29 August 2017
- Preceded by: Pierre Peleyrol
- Succeeded by: Bruno Chaix

Personal details
- Born: 21 July 1965 (age 60) Marseille, France
- Party: Rally for the Republic (until 2002); Union for a Popular Movement (2002–2015); The Republicans (2015–present)

Éric Diard (born 21 July 1965) is a French politician who represented the 12th constituency of the Bouches-du-Rhône department in the National Assembly from 2002 to 2012 and again from 2017 to 2022. A member of The Republicans (LR), he was Mayor of Sausset-les-Pins from 2001 to 2017. As a Member of Parliament, Diard led a parliamentary investigation into Islamic radicalisation in French security services.

== See also ==
- List of MPs who lost their seat in the 2022 French legislative election
