= Guy Teissier =

French politician (born 1945)

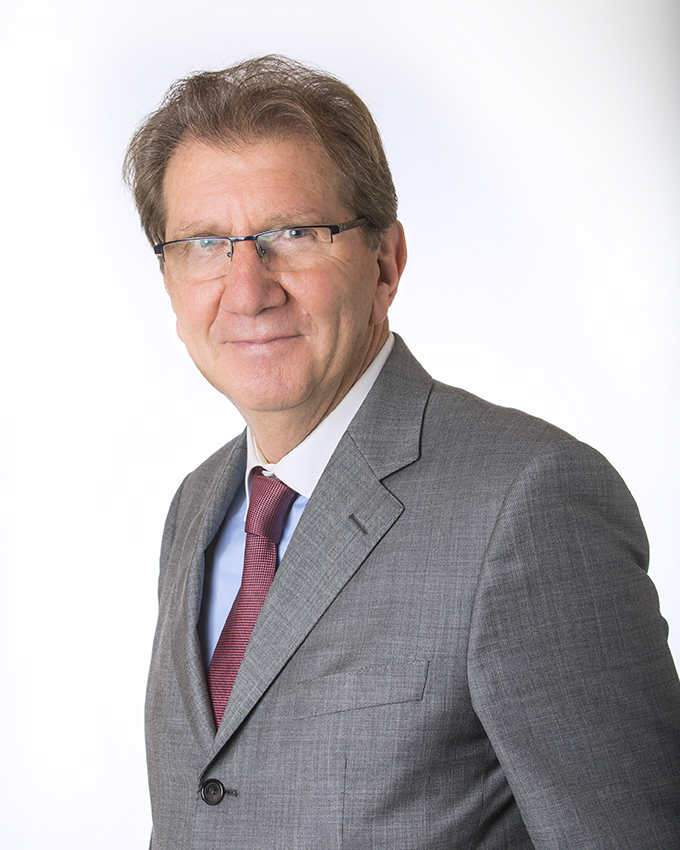

Member of the National Assembly for Bouches-du-Rhône's 6th constituency
- In office 2 April 1993 – 21 June 2022
- Preceded by: Jean-Claude Chermann
- Succeeded by: Lionel Royer-Perreaut
- In office 13 June 1988 – 26 November 1988
- Preceded by: Proportional representation
- Succeeded by: Bernard Tapie

Personal details
- Born: 4 April 1945 (age 81) 15th arrondissement of Marseille, France
- Party: Republican Party, Liberal Democracy, Union for a Popular Movement, The Republicans

Guy Teissier (French pronunciation: [ɡi tɛsje]; born 4 April 1945) is a French politician who served as the member of the National Assembly for the 6th constituency of the Bouches-du-Rhône department from 1993 until 2022, previously briefly holding the position in 1988. He has been a member of The Republicans (LR) since the party was established in 2015 as the successor to the Union for a Popular Movement (UMP). Teissier previously held the mayoralty of the 5th sector of Marseille (9th and 10th arrondissements) from 1983 to 1989 and again from 1995 until 2014.

The Government of Azerbaijan has blacklisted Teissier who visited Artsakh in 2011 without Baku's permission.

He did not run for re-election in the 2022 French legislative election.

== Early life and career ==
Born in the Saint-Antoine quarter of Marseille (15th arrondissement), he became a notary clerk and then a property administrator.

== Political career ==
At the outset of his political career, Teissier was a member of the "extreme right-wing group” of the Nationalist Union. He then joined the New Forces Party, becoming a member of its Central Committee in 1976.

In 1978, he joined the Republican Party, then switched to the Liberal Democracy Party, run by his friend Alain Madelin. In the latter party he served as Deputy Secretary General and was in charge of security and defense issues. Still later, he joined the Union for a Popular Movement, and sat on its nomination committee. In 2015, the UMP changed its name to the Republican Party.

=== Departmental council for Bouches-du-Rhône ===
In 1982, Teissier ran successfully against Jean-Victor Cordonnier for a seat on the departmental council. He was re-elected in 1985, 1992, and 1998. During that period, he was president of the opposition in the council. In March 2004, running again two other candidates, he was re-elected to the post of councilor general in the canton of Sainte-Marguerite with 46.7% of the votes; he resigned from this post in November of that year to devote himself fully to his other political responsibilities.

=== Mayor of a sector of Marseille ===
Since 1983, Teissier has been a member of the Marseille city council. He was elected mayor of the 5th sector (9th and 10th arrondissements) in 1983, and re-elected to that chair in 1995, 2001, and 2008.

In the municipal elections of March 2014, Guy Teissier once again was at the top of the list in the 9th and 10th arrondissements. In the second round of votes, Teissier's list won a three-way contest with more than 51.4% of the votes, while Jean-Claude Gaudin, his local party leader, was re-elected mayor of Marseille. After the election, Teissier gave his seat to one of his relatives, Lionel Royer-Perreaut.

=== Deputy from Bouches-du-Rhône ===
Teissier campaigned in 1988 to represent the 6th constituency of Bouches-du-Rhône. In the June elections he defeated businessman Bernard Tapie, but the election was nullified in November by the Constitutional Council.

In 1993, he was again elected to represent the 6th constituency. During the ensuing period, he held the position of Secretary of National Defense and Armed Forces in the National Assembly. He went on to write several parliamentary information reports. He was re-elected in 1997 and became Secretary of the National Assembly, a post he held until 1999. He served on the Committee of Defense and the Armed Forces and on the Supreme Council of the Military Reserve.

He was re-elected in 2002 with 76% of the votes cast, the highest percentage received in that year's election by any candidate for the National Assembly. His colleagues selected him to be president of the Committee of Defense and the Armed Forces. In this capacity, he chaired the Defense Procurement Control Mission of the Department of Defense, and wrote a new report on the Military Reserves. In 2003, he met with all the major figures in French and European defense under the auspices of the Summer Universities of Defense in Pau.

Re-elected yet again in June 2007, with 55.30% of the votes in the first round, Teissier was reappointed to the presidency of the Defense Committee. In January 2008, he was appointed President of the Parliamentary Intelligence Delegation, responsible for oversight of all French intelligence services.

In June 2012, he was re-elected with 42.45% of the vote in a three-way contest. He remained on the Foreign Affairs Committee, served as president of the Espace study group, and was a member of several others, in addition to serving as vice-president of the friendship groups with Armenia, Israel, and Latvia.

He was re-elected again in June 2017.

=== Urban community of the Marseille Provence conurbation (MPM) ===
He was elected community councilor in 2001, and re-elected to this post in 2008 and 2014.

On April 7, 2014, he was elected president of the MPM with 90 votes, out of a total of 137, succeeding Eugène Caselli (PS) in this post. Teissier promised to seek to revitalize MPM (a conurbation of 18 municipalities with a total of one million inhabitants) in the run-up to its 2016 expansion into the Aix-Marseille Provence conurbation, which includes 93 municipalities with a total of 1.8 million inhabitants.

In 2008, Guy Teissier was elected chairman of the board of directors of the Euro-Mediterranean Public Planning Institution, a large urban-renewal project in central Marseille. He left this position at the end of 2013.

== Additional positions and activities ==
From 1999 to 2012, he chaired the Public Interest Group of the Calanques of Marseille and Cassis, from 1999 to 2012. He was instrumental in establishing the Calanques National Park in 2012.

He was named a Knight of the National Order of Merit in 1983, is an honorary colonel, and has also won the René Cassin medal.

== Personal life ==
He is married and is the father of two children.

On 15 March 2020, Teissier tested positive for COVID-19.
