= Bouches-du-Rhône's 6th constituency =

Constituency of the National Assembly of France

6th constituency of Bouches-du-Rhône
- inline Constituency of the National Assembly of France

- Constituency in Bouches-du-Rhône Department (white area is the Étang de Berre lagoon)

- Bouches-du-Rhône in France
- Deputy: Olivier Fayssat; LR (UXD)
- Department: Bouches-du-Rhône

The 6th constituency of Bouches-du-Rhône is a French legislative constituency in Bouches-du-Rhône.

== Deputies ==
Election	Member	Party
1997	Guy Teissier	UDF
2002	Guy Teissier	UMP
2007	Guy Teissier	UMP
2012	Guy Teissier	UMP
2017	Guy Teissier	LR
2022	Lionel Royer-Perreaut	RE
2024	Olivier Fayssat	UXD

== Elections ==
=== 2024 ===
Candidate	Party	Alliance	First round			Second round		
Candidate	Party	Alliance	Votes	%	+/–	Votes	%	+/–
Olivier Fayssat	LR-RN	UXD	19,151	38.27	new	24,745	52.33	new
Christine Juste	LE	NFP	14,119	28.22	+6.26	22,537	47.67	new
Lionel Royer-Perreaut	RE	Ensemble	12,575	25.13	-4.62	withdrew		
Séréna Zouaghi	LR	UDC	2,231	4.46	-3.93			
Jeannie Astolfi	REC		862	1.72	-5.38			
Stéphanie Brun	DLF		348	0.70	-0.45			
Caroline Couronne	ECO		276	0.55	new			
Corrine Morel	LO		250	0.50	=			
Sébastien Peretti	DIV		217	0.43	new			
Alain Slama	EXD		4	0.01	new			
Tess Jannone	DIV		3	0.01	new			
Sylvie Giovannini	REG		0	0.00	new			
Votes			50,037	100.00		47,282	100.00	
Valid votes			50,037	97.97	-0.75	47,282	93.67	+0.69
Blank votes			757	1.48	+0.51	2,594	5.14	-0.41
Null votes			278	0.54	+0.23	603	1.19	-0.28
Turnout			51,072	64.09	+21.92	50,479	63.32	+23.93
Abstentions			28,613	35.91	-21.92	29,236	36.68	-23.93
Registered voters			79,685			79,715		
Result			UXD GAIN FROM RE					

=== 2022 ===
Legislative Election 2022: Bouches-du-Rhône's 6th constituency
Party	Candidate	Votes	%	±%
LREM (Ensemble)	Lionel Royer-Perreaut	9,725	29.75	-3.40
RN	Éléonore Bez	7,810	23.89	+5.58
PS (NUPÉS)	Magali Holagne	7,179	21.96	+4.21
LR (UDC)	Didier Reault	2,744	8.39	−17.31
REC	Richard Dubreuil	2,321	7.10	N/A
DVG	Sophie Hocini	859	2.63	N/A
DVE	Dominique Laumonier	664	2.03	N/A
Others	N/A	1,387		
Turnout		33,112	42.17	−2.98
2nd round result
LREM (Ensemble)	Lionel Royer-Perreaut	16,646	57.89	+11.42
RN	Éléonore Bez	12,110	42.11	N/A
Turnout		28,756	39.39	+0.98
LREM gain from LR				

=== 2017 ===
Candidate	Label	First round		Second round	
Candidate	Label	Votes	%	Votes	%
Eléonore Leprettre	MoDem	11,169	33.15	12,412	46.47
Guy Teissier	LR	8,659	25.70	14,299	53.53
Eléonore Bez	FN	6,171	18.31		
Annie Gal	FI	3,894	11.56		
Hervé Menchon	ECO	1,115	3.31		
Anthony Gonçalves	PCF	969	2.88		
Dominique Laumonier	ECO	493	1.46		
Véronique Puccini	DLF	315	0.93		
Vincent Vidal	EXD	254	0.75		
Elisa Pergamenter	DIV	156	0.46		
Michel Villeneuve	PRG	138	0.41		
Véronique Morel	EXG	131	0.39		
David Dufour	ECO	121	0.36		
Clément Dufour	DIV	57	0.17		
Stéphanie Brun	DVD	54	0.16		
Abdel Labibes	DVD	0	0.00		
Votes		33,696	100.00	26,711	100.00
Valid votes		33,696	98.64	26,711	91.92
Blank votes		370	1.08	1,864	6.41
Null votes		93	0.27	483	1.66
Turnout		34,159	45.15	29,058	38.41
Abstentions		41,506	54.85	46,594	61.59
Registered voters		75,665		75,652	
Source: Ministry of the Interior

=== 2012 ===
Summary of the 10 June and 17 June 2012 French legislative election in Bouches-du-Rhône’s 6th Constituency
Candidate	Party		1st round		2nd round	
Candidate	Party		Votes	%	Votes	%
Guy Teissier	Union for a Popular Movement	UMP	15,063	37.06%	17,101	42.45%
Pierre Semeriva	Europe Ecology – The Greens	EELV	11,016	27.10%	15,091	37.46%
Laurent Comas	Front National	FN	9,218	22.68%	8,089	20.08%
Anna Rosso Roig	Left Front	FG	2,879	7.08%		
Cédric Matthews	Miscellaneous Left	DVG	705	1.73%		
Patrick Filosa		CEN	532	1.31%		
Eric Talles	Ecologist	ECO	404	0.99%		
Dominique Esteve-Narsisyan	Ecologist	ECO	247	0.61%		
Patrick Placente	Other	AUT	198	0.49%		
Stéphanie Brun-Pothin	Miscellaneous Right	DVD	172	0.42%		
David Larriven	Far Left	EXG	113	0.28%		
Jacqueline Grandel	Far Left	EXG	100	0.25%		
Michel Villeneuve	Radical Party of the Left	PRG	0	0.00%		
Total			40,647	100%	40,281	100%
Registered voters			72,571		72,561	
Blank/Void ballots			384	0.94%	425	1.04%
Turnout			41,031	56.54%	40,706	56.10%
Abstentions			31,540	43.46%	31,855	43.90%
Result					UMP HOLD	

=== 2007 ===
Results of the 10 June and 17 June 2007 French legislative election in Bouches-du-Rhône’s 6th Constituency
Party	Candidate	Votes	%	±%
UMP	Guy Teissier	21,603	55.29	
PS	Ferten Djendoubi	7,181	18.38	
FN	Michèle Carayon	2,898	7.42	
MoDem	Michel Collet Fenetrier	2,094	5.36	
PCF	Brigitte Masson	1,609	4.12	
Far left	Nicole Colomb	1,076	2.75	
LV	Christian Raynaud	693	1.77	
DVE	Michel Villeneuve	499	1.28	
DVE	Mylène Gugliotta	391	1.00	
Far left	Jacqueline Grandel	254	0.65	
MPF	Valérie Ruiz	245	0.63	
Far right	Odette Guillard	223	0.57	
Independent	Christian Guitton	185	0.47	
Independent	Yves Pena	119	0.30	
Independent	Gérard Exbrayat	0	0.00	
Majority		14,422	36.91	
Turnout		39,610	56.50	
UMP hold		Swing		

=== 2002 ===
Legislative Election 2002: Bouches-du-Rhône's 6th constituency
Party	Candidate	Votes	%	±%
UMP	Guy Teissier	18,300	46.35	
FN	Michèle Carayon	7,778	19.70	
LV	Marianne Clarte	6,592	16.70	
PCF	Annick Boet	3,244	8.22	
LCR	Emmanuel Arvois	789	2.00	
Others	N/A	2,780		
Turnout		40,111	63.17	
2nd round result
UMP	Guy Teissier	23,106	76.07	
FN	Michèle Carayon	7,269	23.93	
Turnout		33,134	52.19	
UMP gain from UDF				

=== 1997 ===
Legislative Election 1997: Bouches-du-Rhône's 6th constituency
Party	Candidate	Votes	%	±%
UDF	Guy Teissier	11,272	30.73	
FN	Michèle Carayon	9,141	24.92	
PS	Fernand Pietri	8,662	23.62	
PCF	Annick Boet	4,261	11.62	
LV	Victor Espinosa	858	2.34	
MEI	Gérard Monnier-Besombes	744	2.03	
Others	N/A	1,741		
Turnout		37,768	62.49	
2nd round result
UDF	Guy Teissier	17,956	42.90	
PS	Fernand Pietri	16,248	38.82	
FN	Michèle Carayon	7,654	18.29	
Turnout		42,805	70.82	
UDF hold				
