= Renaud Muselier =

French politician (born 1959)

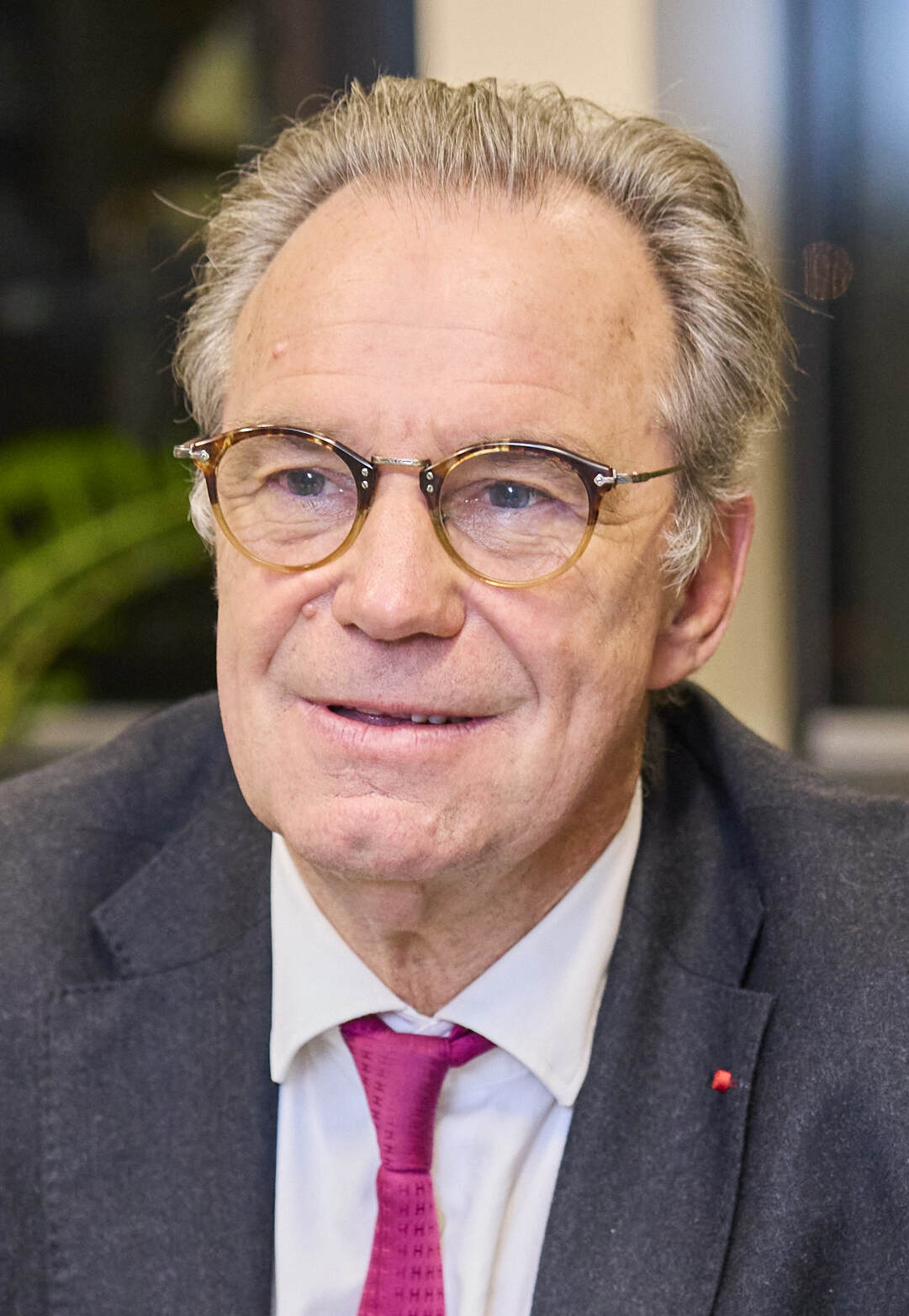
- Muselier in 2025

President of the Regional Council of Provence-Alpes-Côte d'Azur
- Incumbent
- Assumed office 29 May 2017
- Preceded by: Christian Estrosi

Member of the European Parliament
- In office 1 July 2014 – 1 July 2019
- Constituency: South-East France

Secretary of State for Foreign Affairs
- In office 17 June 2002 – 31 May 2005
- Prime Minister: Jean-Pierre Raffarin
- Preceded by: Georges Kiejman (Minister Delegate)
- Succeeded by: Catherine Colonna (Minister for European Affairs)

Member of the National Assembly for Bouches-du-Rhône's 5th constituency
- In office 20 June 2007 – 19 June 2012
- Preceded by: Bruno Gilles
- Succeeded by: Marie-Arlette Carlotti
- In office 2 April 1993 – 19 July 2002
- Preceded by: Janine Écochard
- Succeeded by: Bruno Gilles

Personal details
- Born: Renaud Émile Gontran Muselier; 6 May 1959 (age 67) Marseille, France
- Party: Renaissance (2022–present)
- Other political affiliations: Rally for the Republic (1976–2002); Union for a Popular Movement (2002–2015); The Republicans (2015–2021)
- Profession: Physician

Renaud Émile Gontran Muselier ([ʁəno myz(ə)lje]; born 6 May 1959) is a French-Mauritian physician and politician who has served as President of the Regional Council of Provence-Alpes-Côte d'Azur since 2017. A member of The Republicans (LR) until 2021, he joined Renaissance (RE) the following year. He previously was a Member of the European Parliament (MEP) from 2014 to 2019.

== Early life and education ==
A native of Marseille, Muselier is the grandson of Admiral Émile Muselier. He is the nephew of the Queen Geraldine of Albania (née Countess Apponyi de Nagy-Apponyi), wife of the last King of Albania, Zog I, deposed by the Italians in 1939.

== Political career ==
Muselier was the member of the General Council of Bouches-du-Rhône for the canton of Marseille – Notre-Dame-du-Mont from 1992 to 1995, as well as a member of the Regional Council of Provence-Alpes-Côte d'Azur from 2004 to 2007. He was Deputy Mayor of Marseille from 1995 to 2008 under the mayorship of Jean-Claude Gaudin.

=== Early career in national politics ===
Muselier was the deputy in the National Assembly of France for the 5th constituency of Bouches-du-Rhône from 1993 to 2002. During that time, her served on the Committee on Cultural Affairs.

From 2002 to 2005, Muselier served as Secretary of State for Foreign Affairs, under the leadership of successive ministers Dominique de Villepin and Michel Barnier.

Following the 2007 legislative election, Muselier re-joined the National Assembly, serving on its Committee on Foreign Affairs from 2007 to 2012.

Muselier was reelected of the Regional Council of Provence-Alpes-Côte d'Azur in 2015 and became its first vice-president under the presidency of Christian Estrosi.

=== Member of the European Parliament, 2014–2019 ===
Muselier became a Member of the European Parliament following the 2014 European election. Throughout his term, he served on the Committee on Transport and Tourism. In addition to his committee assignments, he was a member of the Parliament's delegation to the ACP–EU Joint Parliamentary Assembly.

In the 2016 The Republicans presidential primary, Muselier endorsed Nicolas Sarkozy as the party's candidate for the office of President of France.

=== Regional Council of Provence-Alpes-Côte d'Azur, 2017–present ===
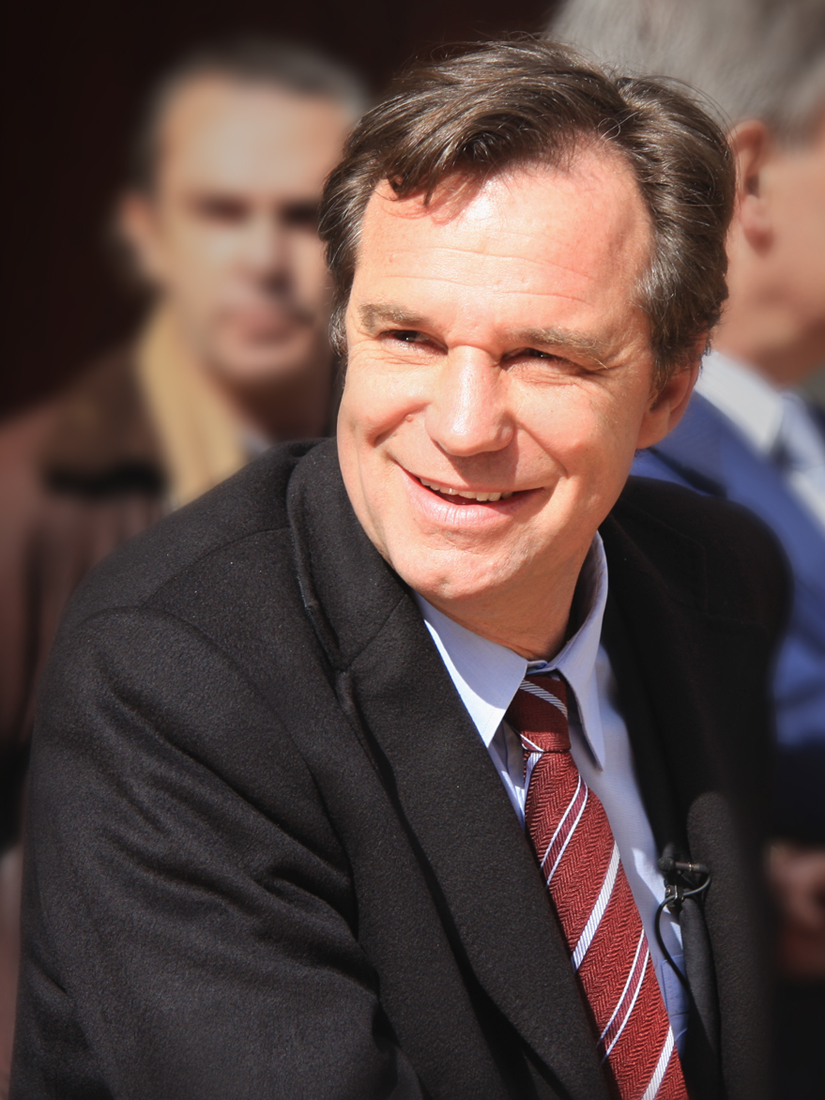
Muselier in 2010

On 29 May 2017, Muselier was elected President of the Regional Council of Provence-Alpes-Côte d'Azur, succeeding Christian Estrosi, who returned as Mayor of Nice.

Muselier announced his intention to run for reelection on a joint ticket with La République En Marche! (LREM) in 2021, under an agreement brokered by Prime Minister Jean Castex. However, this led to the resignation of Nice Mayor Christian Estrosi and Toulon Mayor Hubert Falco from The Republicans a few days later. LREM politician Sophie Cluzel subsequently announced she would lead a list herself, thus terminating the joint ticket agreement, before backtracking and announcing the agreement would be upheld. Muselier ultimately received 57.3 percent of the vote, against 42.7 percent for National Rally candidate Thierry Mariani.

Ahead of the 2022 presidential election, Muselier publicly declared his support for Xavier Bertrand as The Republicans' candidate. Shortly after, he announced his decision to leave The Republicans, accusing fellow party member Éric Ciotti of "conveying the ideas of Éric Zemmour within LR", after Ciotti stated he would vote for Zemmour in a hypothetical runoff against Emmanuel Macron.

Muselier has supported the LGV Provence-Alpes-Côte d'Azur. State financing for the project was approved in 2022, and President Macron visited Marseille-Saint-Charles station with Muselier and Martine Vassal in 2025 to mark the beginning of construction work.

Alongside Laurent Wauquiez of Auvergne-Rhône-Alpes, Muselier was instrumental in securing the French Alps hosting the 2030 Winter Olympics. At the 2026 Winter Olympics closing ceremony, he and Fabrice Pannekoucke received the Olympic flag, marking the handover to the next Winter Games host country. Muselier called his efforts for the 2030 Olympics the "apotheosis" of his political career.

== Personal life ==
In 2022 Muselier stated he had accepted a dual citizenship offer by the government of Mauritius after he made investments in the country. He specified not holding a bank account in Mauritius.

== Honours ==
- Officer of the Legion of Honour (2022)

== Other activities ==
- Associations Pensons le Grand Marseille et Cap sur l'Avenir, President
- Chorégies d'Orange, Member of the Board of Directors
- Fondation Philippe Daher, Member of the Board of Directors
- French Development Agency (AFD), Member of the Board of Directors
- Institut du Monde Arabe (IMA), chairman of the Board of Trustees (since 2011)
- Rencontres d'Arles, Honorary Member of the Board of Directors
