= Michel Pezet =

French politician

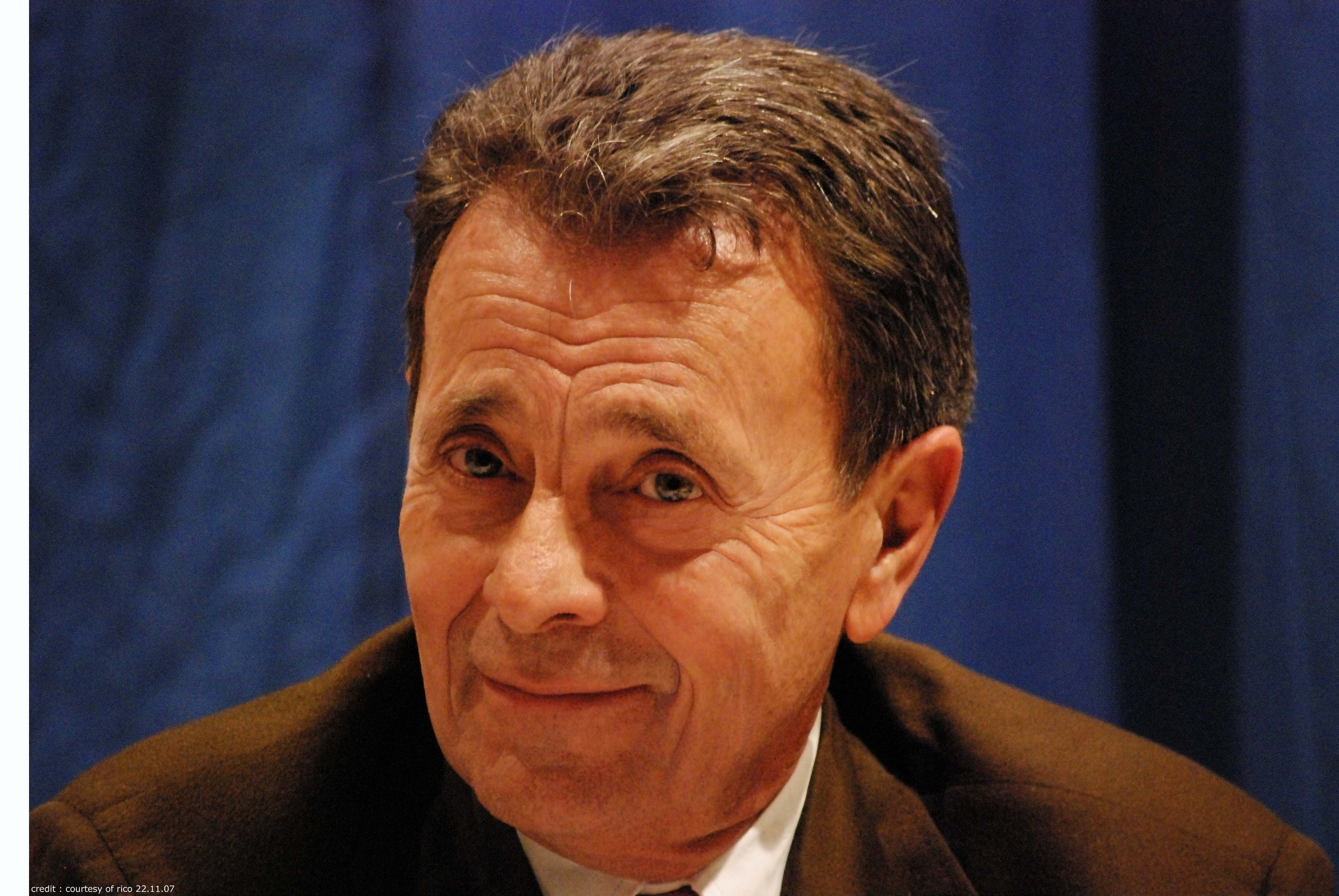
- Born: April 9, 1942 (age 84); Marseille, Bouches-du-Rhône, Provence-Alpes-Côte d'Azur, France
- Occupation: Politician
- Political party: Socialist Party

Michel Pezet (born 1942) is a French politician.

== Early life ==
Michel Pezet was born on April 2, 1942, in Marseille, France.

== Career ==
Pezet is a lawyer and a member of the Socialist Party. He served as a member of the National Assembly from 1988 to 1993.
