= List of mayors of Marseille =

Benoît Payan
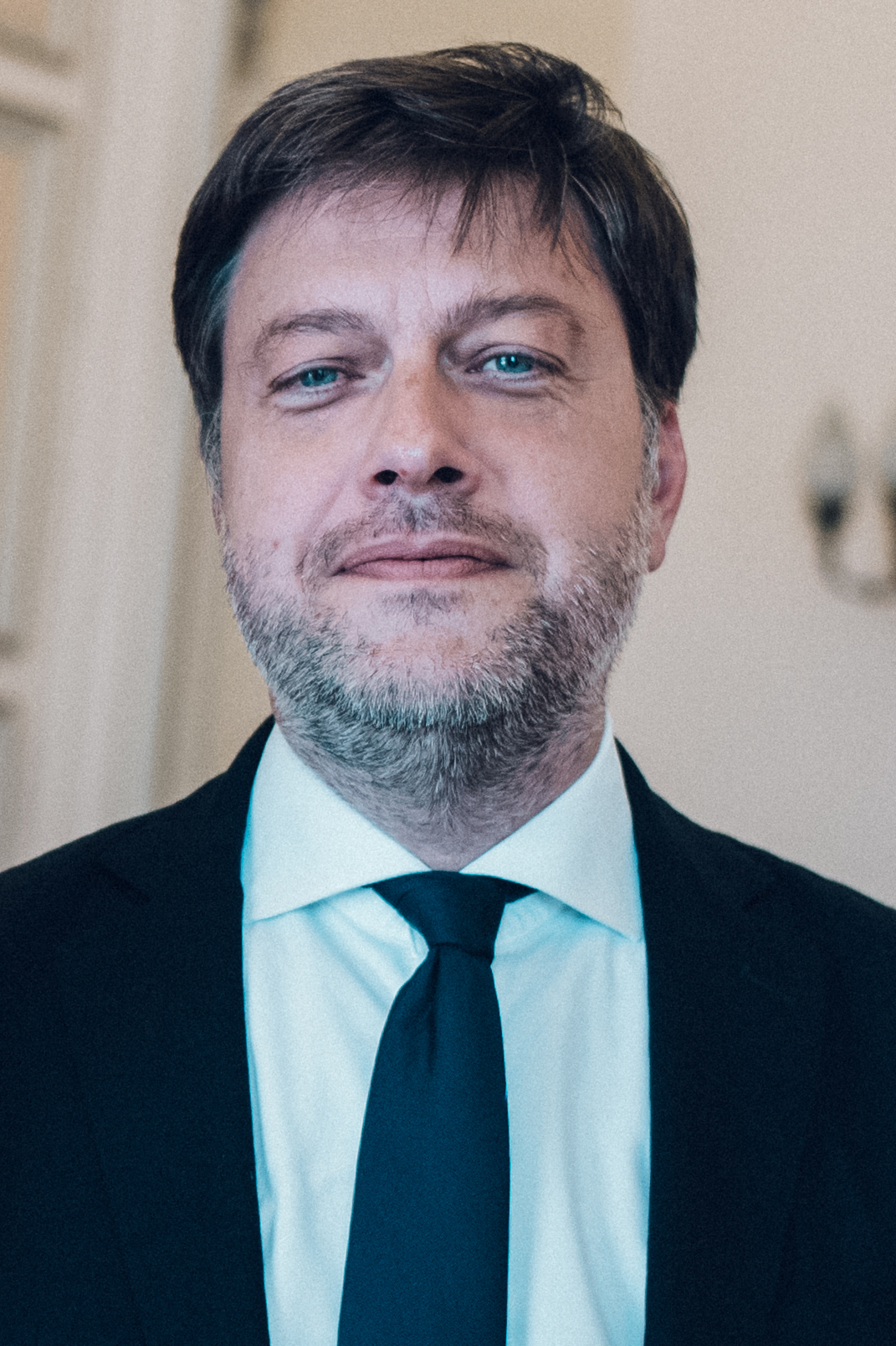
- Current Mayor of Marseille
- Incumbent
- Assumed office 15 December 2020
- Preceded by: Michèle Rubirola

Personal details
- Born: 31 January 1978 (age 48)
- Party: Socialist Party

The mayor of Marseille is the chairperson of the municipal council in Marseille, France, a civil officer of the state, and judiciary police officer. This position is elected by a municipal council through universal suffrage. However, according to French law, a city can have a certain amount of councilors depending on the inhabitants. This is sort of an exception for Marseille which has a set number of 101 councilors. All French municipal councilors have no term limits but can have a total of six years per term in office. The mayor also has a six-year term limit and can also be elected with no set limit.

== Pre WW1 (1895–1914) ==
Mayor	Term start	Term end	Party
Siméon Flaissières	1895	1902	POF
Albin Curet	1902	1902	Independent
Jean-Baptiste-Amable Chanot	1902	1908	FR
Emmanuel Allard	1908	1910	FR
Clément Lévy	1910	1910	Independent
Bernard Cadenat	1910	1912	SFIO
Jean-Baptiste-Amable Chanot (Re-Elected)	1912	1914	FR

== Mayors during and after WW1 (1914–1939) ==
Mayor	Term start	Term end	Party
Eugène Pierre	1914	1919	Independent
Siméon Flaissières	1919	1931	SFIO
Simon Sabiani	1931	1931	Independent
Georges Ribot	1931	1935	RAD
Henri Tasso	1935	1939	SFIO

== Guardianship (1939-1944) ==
The city was placed under guardianship and run by administrators:

- 1939-1940: Henri Cado, extraordinary administrator
- 1940: Frédéric Surleau, extraordinary administrator
- 1940-1944: Louis Barraud, extraordinary administrator.

== Mayors since Liberation (1944–present) ==
Mayor	Term start	Term end	Party
Pierre Massenet (ingénieur)	1944	1946	(independent)
Jean Cristofol	1946	1947	PCF
Michel Carlini	1947	1953	RPF
Gaston Defferre	1953	1986	SFIO, PS
Jean-Victor Cordonnier	1986	1986	PS
Robert Vigouroux	1986	1995	PS, DVG
Jean-Claude Gaudin	1995	2020	UDF-PR, DL, UMP, LR
Michèle Rubirola	2020	2020	EELV
Benoît Payan	2020	Incumbent	PS

== See also ==
- Mayor (France)
- Municipal council (France)
