= 7th arrondissement of Marseille =

- Municipal arrondissement
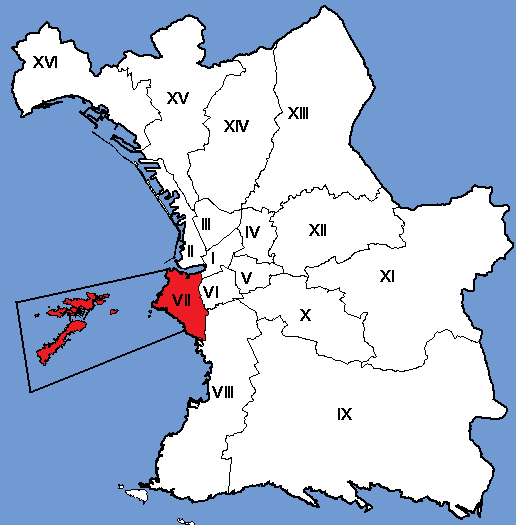
- Location within Marseille
- Interactive map of 7th arrondissement of Marseille
- Coordinates: 43.2828°N 5.3617°E
- Country: France
- Region: Provence-Alpes-Côte d'Azur
- Department: Bouches-du-Rhône
- Commune: Marseille

Government
  - Mayor (2020–2026): Sophie Camard (FI)
- Area: 5.691 km^{2} (2.197 sq mi)
- Population (2023): 35,173
  - Density: 6,180/km^{2} (16,010/sq mi)
- INSEE code: 13207

The 7th arrondissement of Marseille is one of the 16 arrondissements of Marseille, France. It is governed locally together with the 1st arrondissement, with which it forms the 1st sector of Marseille.

== Population ==
Historical population
Year	Pop.	±% p.a.
1968	53,957	—
1975	47,006	−1.95%
1982	40,655	−2.05%
1990	36,704	−1.27%
1999	36,006	−0.21%
2007	35,981	−0.01%
2012	35,620	−0.20%
2017	34,909	−0.40%
2023	35,173	+0.13%
Source: INSEE

Neighbourhood	Population (2022)
Bompard	4,052
Endoume	4,761
Les Îles	224
Le Pharo	6,536
Le Roucas Blanc	3,474
Saint-Lambert	9,168
Saint-Victor	6,647

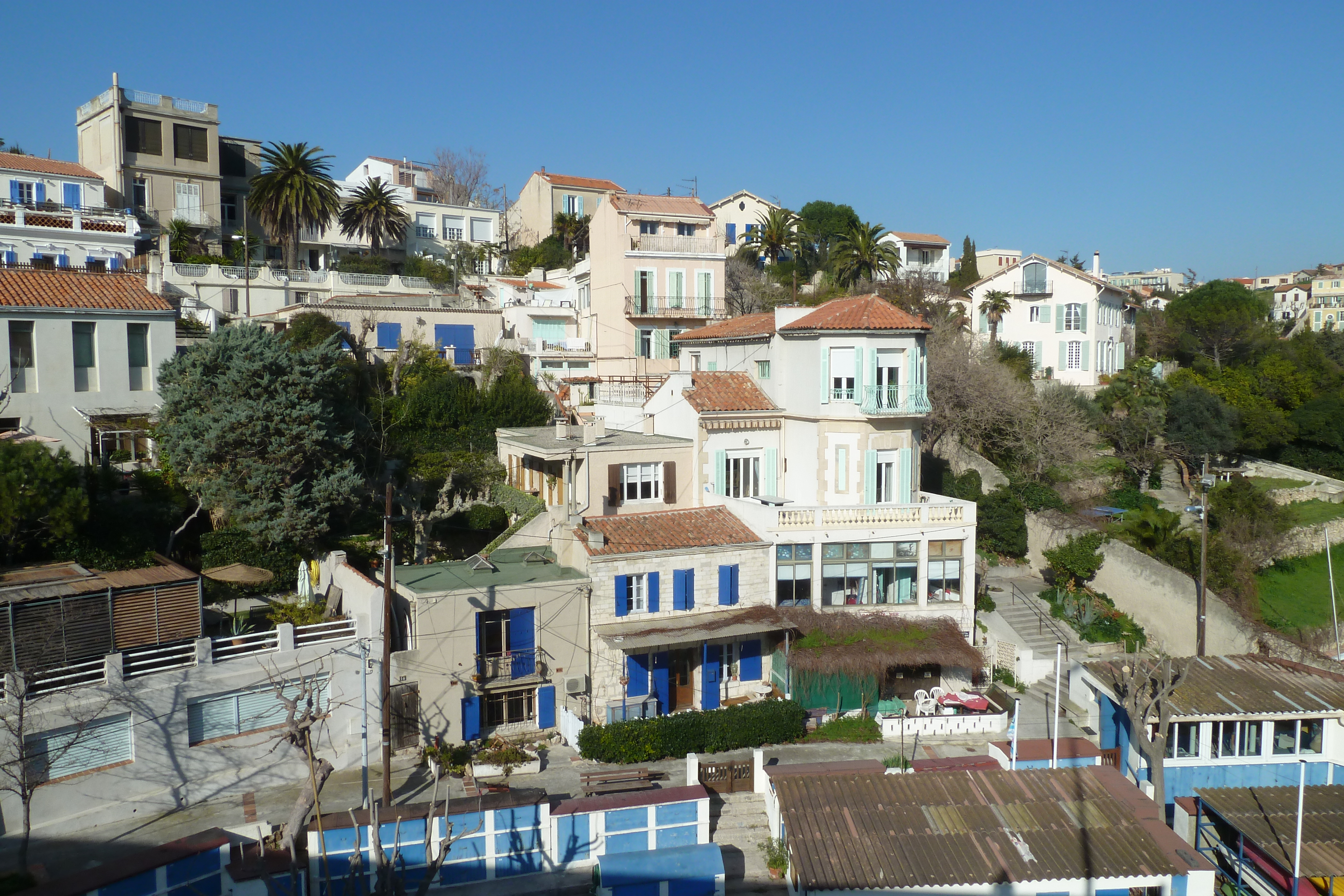
Endoume

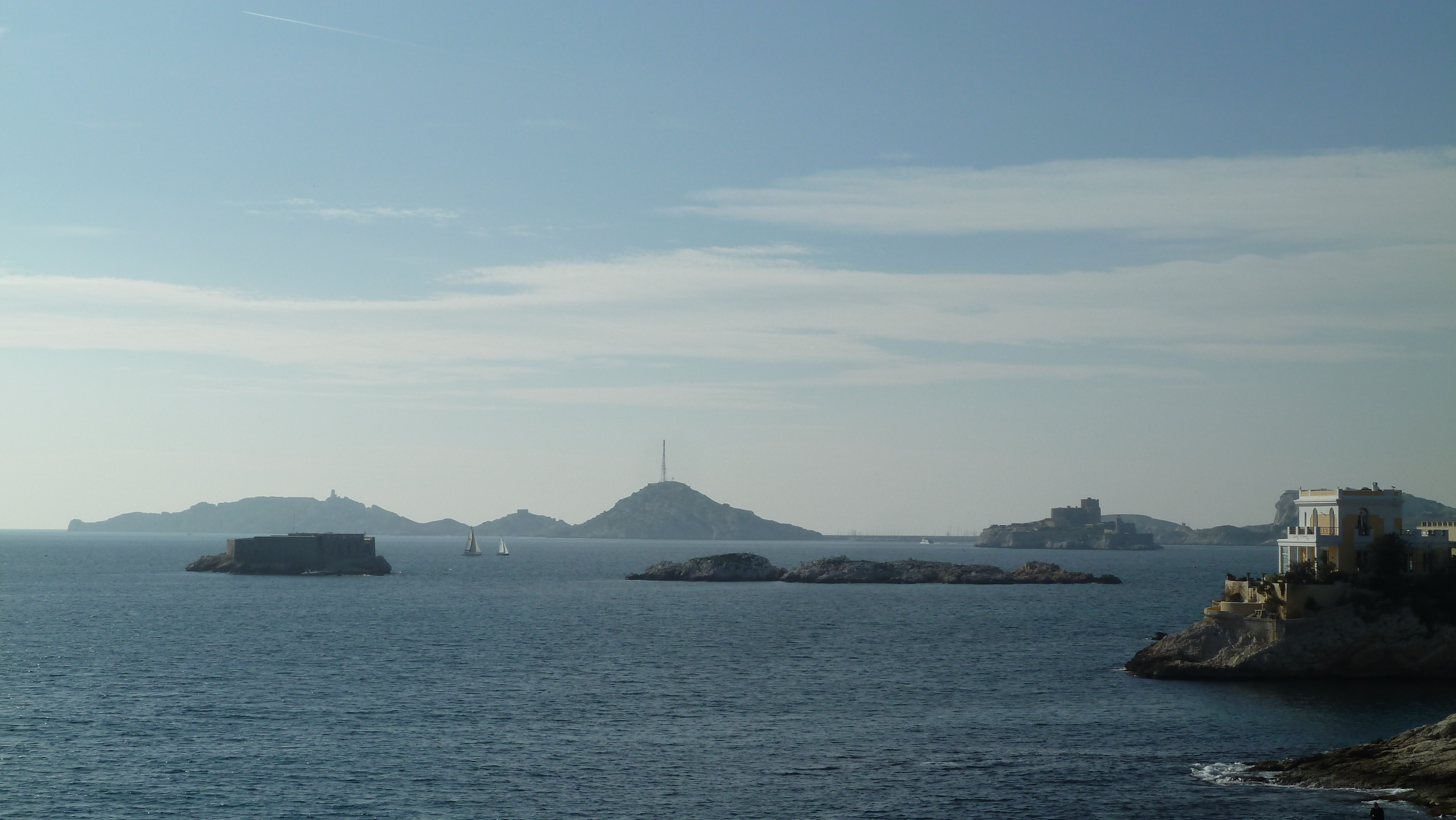
Les Îles

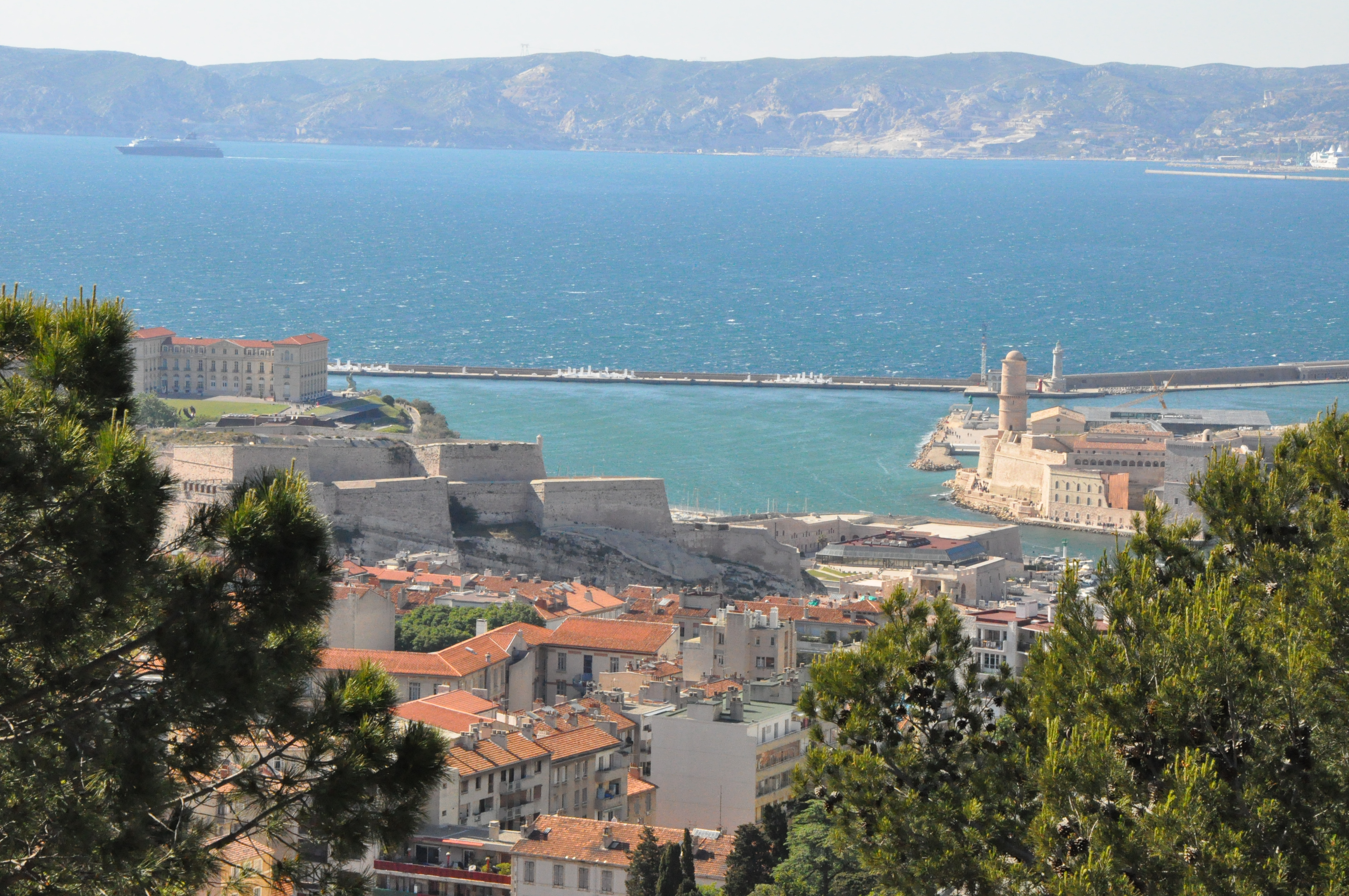
Le Pharo

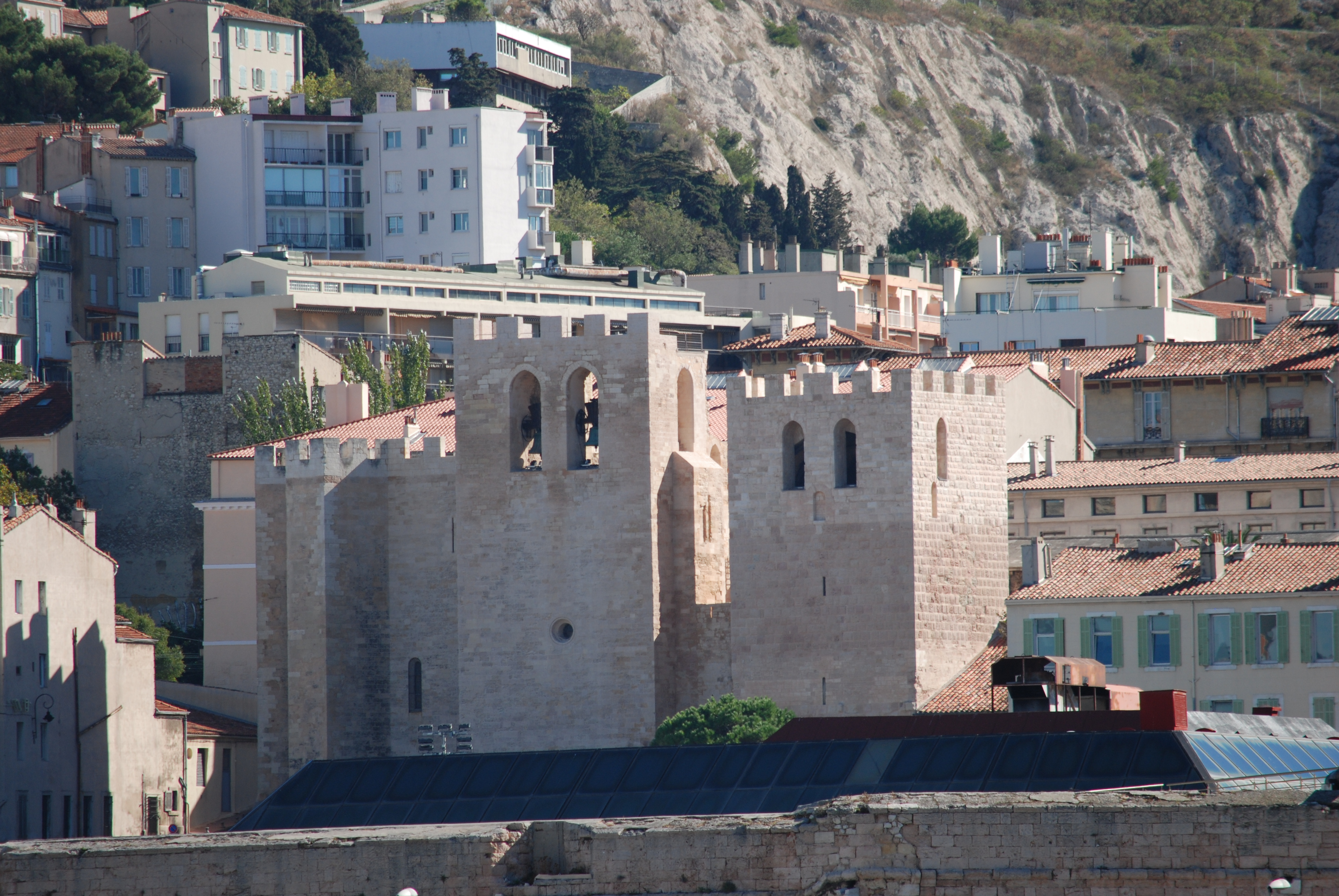
Saint-Victor
