= Michèle Rubirola =

French politician (born 1956)

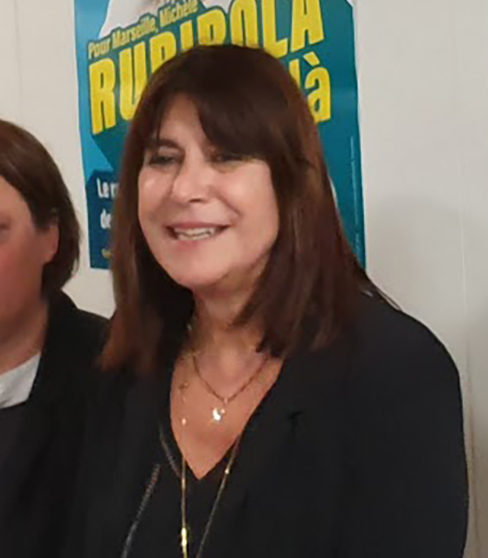

Mayor of Marseille
- In office 4 July 2020 – 15 December 2020
- Preceded by: Jean-Claude Gaudin
- Succeeded by: Benoît Payan

Personal details
- Born: 28 July 1956 (age 70) Marseille, France
- Party: Europe Ecology – The Greens (2010–present)
- Other political affiliations: The Greens (2002–2010)
- Education: Aix-Marseille University (PhD)
- Occupation: Physician, politician

Michèle Rubirola (French pronunciation: [miʃɛl ʁybiʁɔla]; born 28 July 1956) is a French politician who served as Mayor of Marseille from 4 July to 15 December 2020. A member of Europe Ecology – The Greens (EELV), she succeeded Jean-Claude Gaudin, who chose not to run for reelection to a fifth term in office and instead endorsed his long-term deputy Martine Vassal, who lost the mayorship race following the municipal election in June 2020. Rubirola became the first female Mayor of Marseille.

On 15 December 2020, she announced her resignation from the mayorship for health reasons. She was succeeded by First Deputy Mayor Benoît Payan of the Socialist Party, whom she succeeded as First Deputy Mayor on 21 December 2021. Rubirola previously held a seat in the Departmental Council of Bouches-du-Rhône from 2015 to 2021, elected in the canton of Marseille-1 alongside Payan.

Her grandparents came from Catalonia and Naples. She is a physician by occupation.
