= Regional Council of Provence-Alpes-Côte d'Azur =

French regional assembly

Regional Council of Provence-Alpes-Côte d'Azur: French: Conseil régional de Provence-Alpes-Côte d'Azur
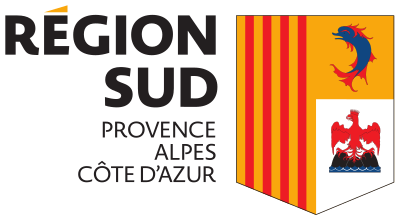

Type
- Type: Regional council

Leadership
- President: Renaud Muselier, RE since 29 May 2017

Structure
- Seats: 123
- Political groups: Government (84): LR–ENS (84); Opposition (39): RN (39)

Elections
- Voting system: Two-round list proportional representation system with majority bonus
- Last election: 20 and 27 June 2021
- Next election: 2028 French regional elections

Meeting place
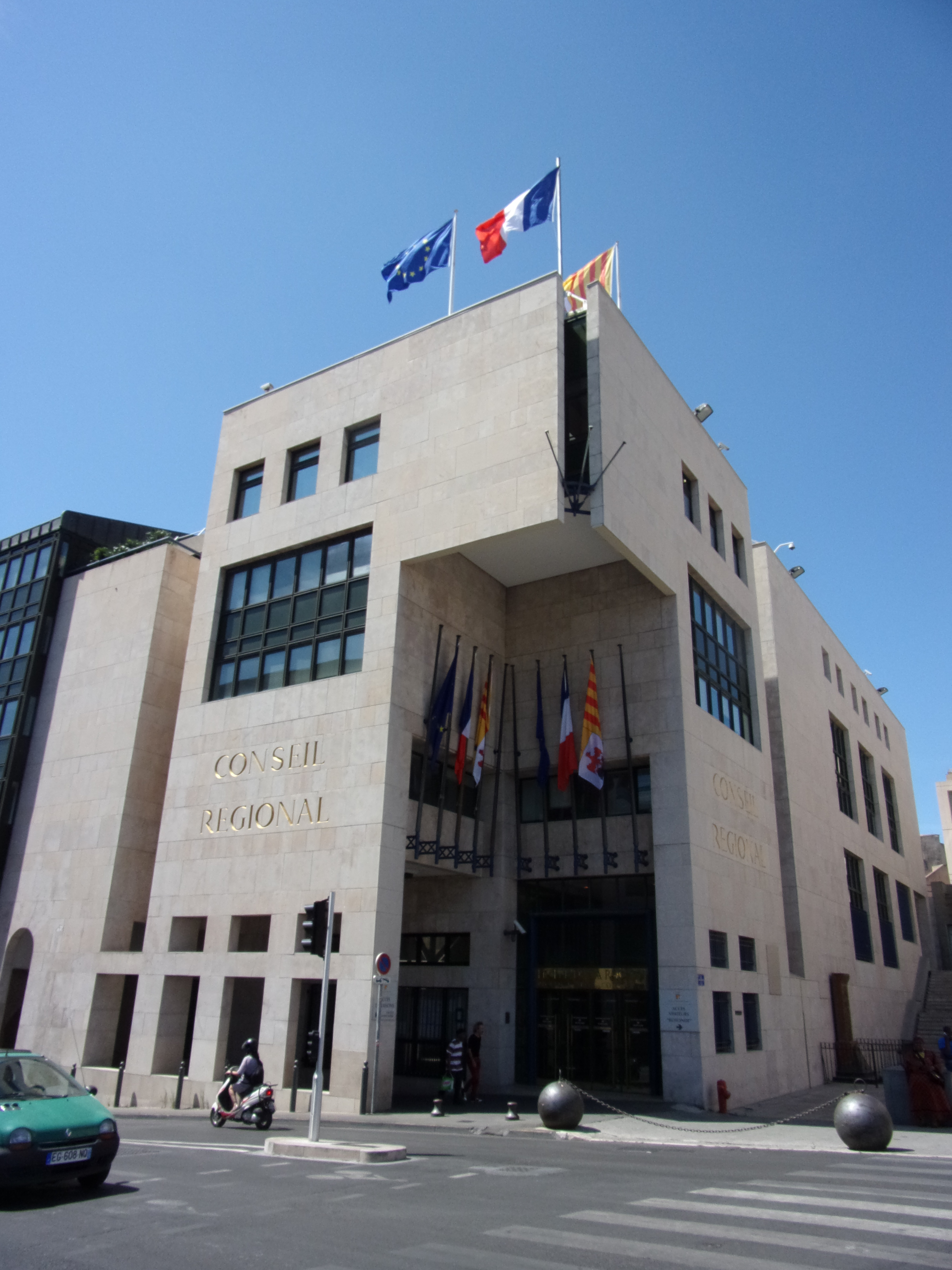
- Hôtel de Région, 27 Place Jules-Guesde, Marseille

The Regional Council of Provence-Alpes-Côte d'Azur (French: Conseil régional de Provence-Alpes-Côte d'Azur; Occitan: Conselh regional de Provença-Aups-Còsta d'Azur) is the deliberative assembly of the French region of Provence-Alpes-Côte d'Azur. The regional council is made up of 123 regional councillors elected for 6 years by direct universal suffrage. It has been chaired by Renaud Muselier, of Renaissance (RE), since 2017.

The Provence-Alpes-Côte d'Azur region is a founding member of the Alps–Mediterranean Euroregion, created on 10 October 2007.

== Headquarters ==
The Regional Council of Provence-Alpes-Côte d'Azur sits at the Hôtel de Région located in Marseille, 27 Place Jules-Guesde, near the Belsunce district. The Hôtel de Région is served by the Colbert – Hôtel de Région Marseille Metro station.

== Presidents ==
Period	President	Party
1974–1981	Gaston Defferre	Socialist Party
1981–1986	Michel Pezet	Socialist Party
1986–1998	Jean-Claude Gaudin	Union for French Democracy
1998–2015	Michel Vauzelle	Socialist Party
2015–2017	Christian Estrosi	The Republicans
2017–present	Renaud Muselier	The Republicans (formerly)

== Vice-presidents ==
List of vice-presidents
Position	Last name	Delegation
1st Vice-President	Christian Estrosi	Major Events, International Relations and La Francophonie
2nd Vice-President	Chantal Eymeoud	Mountain Plan and European Affairs
3rd Vice-President	François De Canson	Economic development, attractiveness, tourism and prevention of major risks
4th Vice President	Sophie Joissains	Culture
5th Vice President	David Gehant	Regional planning, assistance to communes and intercommunalities
6th Vice President	Bénédicte Martin	Agriculture, viticulture, rurality and terroir
7th Vice President	Jean-Pierre Colin	Finance and cooperation partnerships
8th Vice President	Véronique Borre	Security, defense, support for law enforcement and innovation for a peaceful region
9th Vice President	Nicolas Isnard	Vocational training and employment policy
10th Vice President	Marie-Florence Bulteau-Rambaud	Education, high schools, guidance and learning
11th Vice President	Serge Amar	Crafts, trade and VSE-PME
12th Vice President	Virginie Pin	Art of living in Provence-Alpes-Côte d'Azur, heritage and traditions
13th Vice President	Jean-Pierre Serrus	Transport and sustainable mobility
14th Vice President	Jacqueline Bouyac	Democratic renewal, citizen participation and strengthening of public services
15th Vice President	Ludovic Perney	Youth, sports and student life

== Distribution ==
The 123 seats of the Council are distributed by department: as follows:

- 4 advisers for the Alpes-de-Haute-Provence
- 4 advisers for the Hautes-Alpes
- 28 advisers for the Alpes-Maritimes
- 47 advisers for the Bouches-du-Rhône
- 27 advisers for the Var
- 13 advisers for Vaucluse

== Sash ==
Scarf of the regional advisers of Provence-Alpes-Côte d'Azur

The regional advisers of Provence-Alpes-Côte d'Azur wear a two-tone sash, red and gold. Unlike the tricolor sash of parliamentarians and municipal elected officials, the wearing of the regional sash is not sanctioned by an official text.

== Regional Youth Parliament ==
The regional youth parliament was created in 2017 by the president of the regional council, Renaud Muselier. Its aim is to contribute to regional public policies on themes that directly or indirectly concern young people in the Provence-Alpes-Côte d'Azur region. It allows young parliamentarians to discover the functioning of the regional authority, within the framework of an active citizenship and to bring out projects carried out by young people.

Parliament meets in the form of plenary assemblies, factories and workshops. It has an operating council. It can also meet ad hoc working groups on an ad hoc basis. In July 2017, an autonomy budget was allocated to the Regional Youth Parliament so that it could carry out its projects.

The young parliamentarians, numbering 80, represent the region with regard to the demographic weight of their training sector in the regional territory (public / private high schools, CFA of the region and students in health and social facilities), as well as with respect of the principle of parity between women and men and of territorial balance. The term of office is one year, renewable once.
