= Nora Mebarek =

French politician (born 1972)

Nora Mebarek MEP
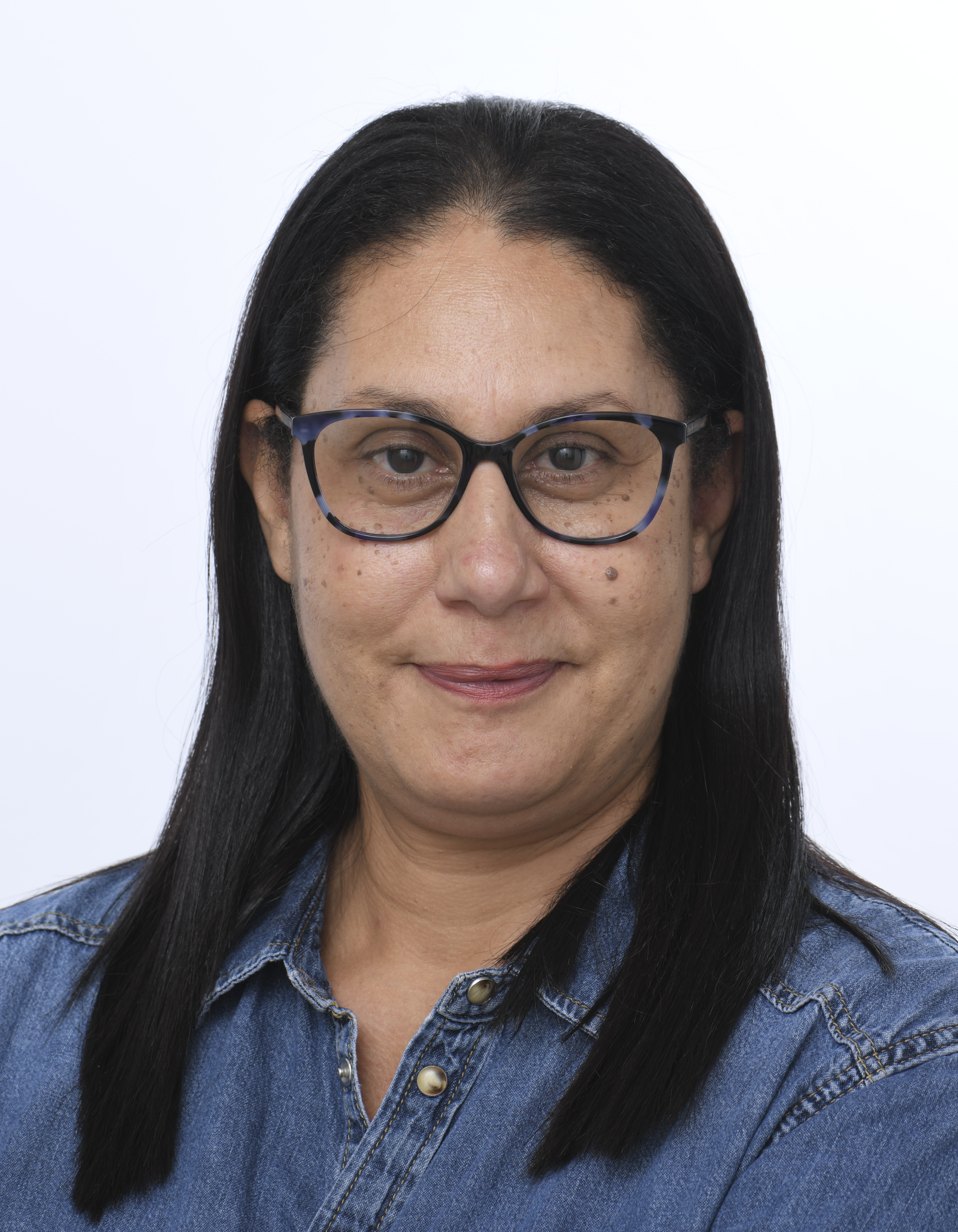

Member of the European Parliament for France
- Incumbent
- Assumed office 1 February 2020

Personal details
- Born: 22 July 1972 (age 53) Port-Saint-Louis-du-Rhône, Bouches-du-Rhône, France
- Party: Socialist
- Website: Nora Mebarek

Nora Mebarek (born 22 July 1972) is a French politician of the Socialist Party (PS) who has been a Member of the European Parliament since February 2020.

== Political career ==
Mebarek stood in the 2017 French legislative election in Bouches-du-Rhône's 16th constituency, a seat with an incumbent socialist MP, Michel Vauzelle, who was standing down. She came in 5th place on the first round and was eliminated. The seat was won in the second round by Monica Michel from La République En Marche!.

Mebarek stood in the 2019 European Parliament election in France. She was placed 6th on the PS–PP–ND list, and so was not elected immediately but secured a seat among the British seats that were redistributed after the UK left the European Union. She took her seat in the European Parliament after Brexit. She sits with the Progressive Alliance of Socialists and Democrats.

In parliament, Mebarek serves on the Committee on Regional Development. Since 2021, she has been part of the Parliament's delegation to the Conference on the Future of Europe. In addition to her committee assignments, she is part of the Parliament’s delegation for relations with the Mashreq countries.

Mebarek was re-elected as an MEP following the 2024 European Parliament election.

== Political positions ==
In May 2021, Mebarek joined a group of 39 mostly Green Party lawmakers from the European Parliament who in a letter urged the leaders of Germany, France and Italy not to support Arctic LNG 2, a $21 billion Russian Arctic liquefied natural gas (LNG) project, due to climate change concerns.

Ahead of the 2022 presidential elections, Mebarek publicly declared her support for Anne Hidalgo as the Socialists’ candidate and joined her campaign team. In 2023, she publicly endorsed the re-election of the party's chairman Olivier Faure.

== See also ==
- List of members of the European Parliament for France, 2019–2024
- List of members of the European Parliament (2024–2029)
