= Thérèse Aillaud =

French politician (1931–2015)

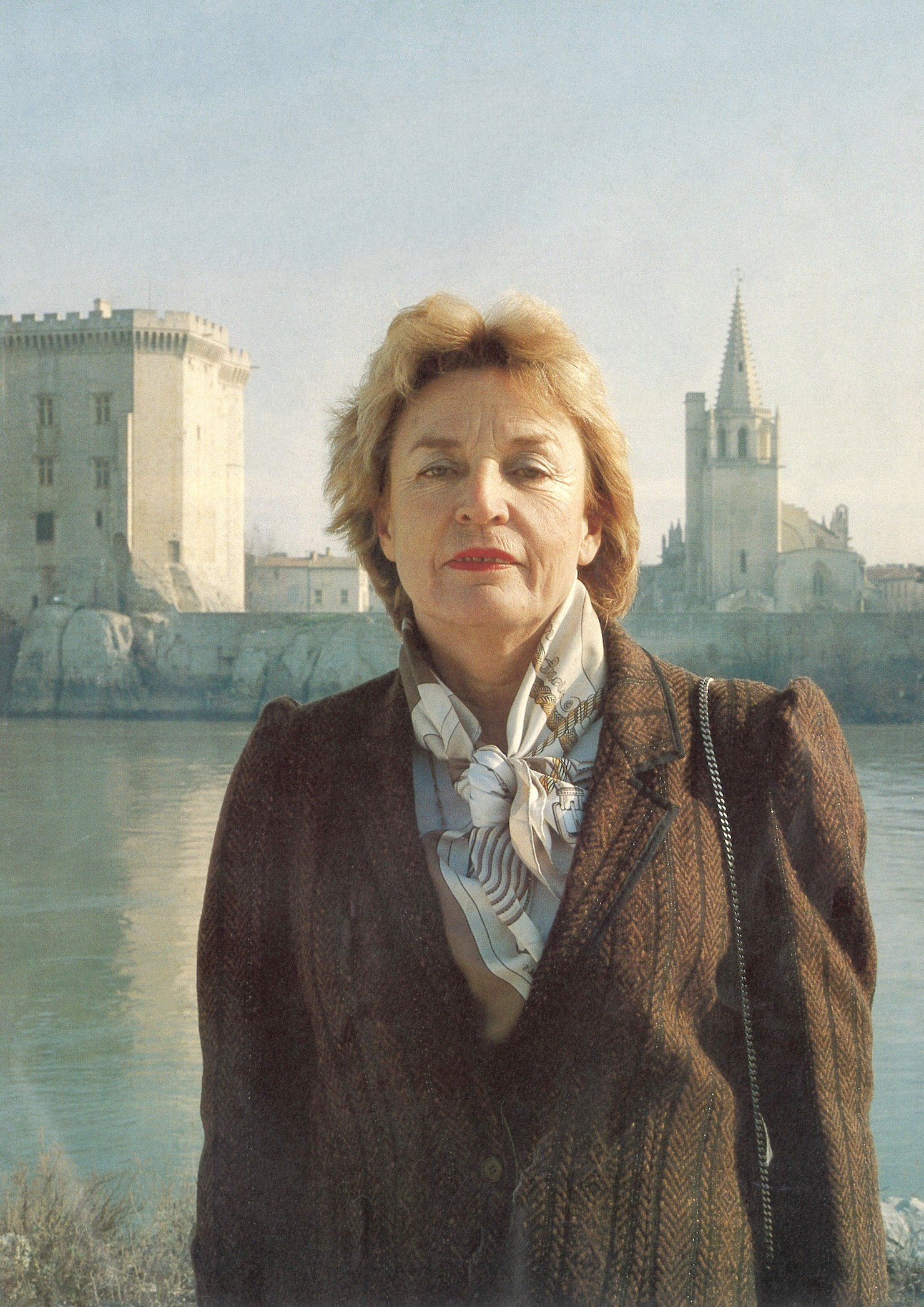

Deputy of the National Assembly for Bouches-du-Rhône's 16th constituency
- In office 2 April 1993 – 21 April 1997
- Succeeded by: Michel Vauzelle

Personal details
- Born: Thérèse Marie Madeleine Chaix; 5 November 1931 Tarascon, Bouches-du-Rhône, France
- Died: 25 February 2015 (aged 83) Tarascon, Bouches-du-Rhône, France
- Party: Rally for the Republic
- Children: 3

Thérèse Marie Madeleine Aillaud (née Chaix; 5 November 1931 – 25 February 2015) was a French politician of the Rally for the Republic party. She was mayor of Tarascon from 1983 to 2002 and deputy of the Bouches-du-Rhône's 16th constituency of the National Assembly between 1993 and 1997.

== Early life and education ==
Aillaud was born in Tarascon, Bouches-du-Rhône on 5 November 1931. Her mother was a devout Catholic and the family sheltered a Jewish family during the Second World War. Aillaud was a law graduate with a diplôme d'études universitaires générales in Hebrew by attending a kibbutz.

== Career ==
Her career began as a prefectural attaché. In 1962, Aillaud joined the Arles sub-prefecture to establish the repatriation service for the Harkis populations following the conclusion of the Algerian War. Between 1964 and 1983, she was chief of staff of the sub-prefect. Aillaud was elected mayor of Tarascon on four occasions from 1983 to 2002, representing the Rally for the Republic party. She became a general councillor in 1988, holding a mandate on the Departmental Council of Bouches-du-Rhône between 1993 and 1997.

At the 1993 French legislative election, Aillaud stood to run for election to the Bouches-du-Rhône's 16th constituency. She was elected to serve as deputy for the constituency on 2 April 1993. Aillaud held a number of study groups, commissions of inquiry in the National Assembly; was a member of the Commission for Cultural, Family and Social Affairs; was vice-president of the France–Israel friendship group and was a member of the board of directors of the national programme company La Cinquième. Her term ended on 21 April 1997.

In February 2001, Aillaud was given an 18-month suspended sentence and five years of ineligibility for embezzling public funds (F454,000 for personal expenses). She was permitted to run in municipal elections. This led to Aillaud being dismissed from the office of mayor of Tarascon in May 2002. She travelled to Jerusalem every year for several years and took part in summer courses offered by the Hebrew University of Jerusalem.

== Death ==
She was the mother of three children. Aillaud died in Tarascon on 25 February 2015. Flags in Tarascon were lowered to half-mast until 5 March. Her funeral took place at Église Sainte-Marthe de Tarascon on the morning of 4 March 2015 and she was buried at St Lazare Cemetery.
