= Canton of Saintes-Maries-de-la-Mer =

Coordinates: 43°27′10″N 4°25′43″E

The Canton of Saintes-Maries-de-la-Mer is a former French canton located in the Bouches-du-Rhône département of France, in the arrondissement of Arles. It had 2,495 inhabitants (2012). It was disbanded following the French canton reorganisation which came into effect in March 2015. It comprised the commune of Saintes-Maries-de-la-Mer, which joined the new canton of Arles in 2015.

Its last representative (Conseiller Général) was Roland Chassain (UMP, in office 1994–2015).
