= Port Napoleon =

Several ports were briefly named Port Napoleon during Napoleon's reign in France.

- Port-Saint-Louis-du-Rhône
- Between 1803 and 1810, Port Louis, the capital of Mauritius, was known as Port Napoleon.
