= Mebarek =

Mebarek is a given name and surname of North African descent.

== List of people with the given name ==
- Mebarek Soltani (born 1982), Algerian boxer

== List of people with the surname ==
- Mahrez Mebarek (born 1985), Algerian swimmer
- Nora Mebarek (born 1972), French politician

== See also ==
- Muborak, Uzbekistan
