= Verrerie de Trinquetaille =

Former factory of glass products

Coordinates: 43.681888°N 4.620833°E

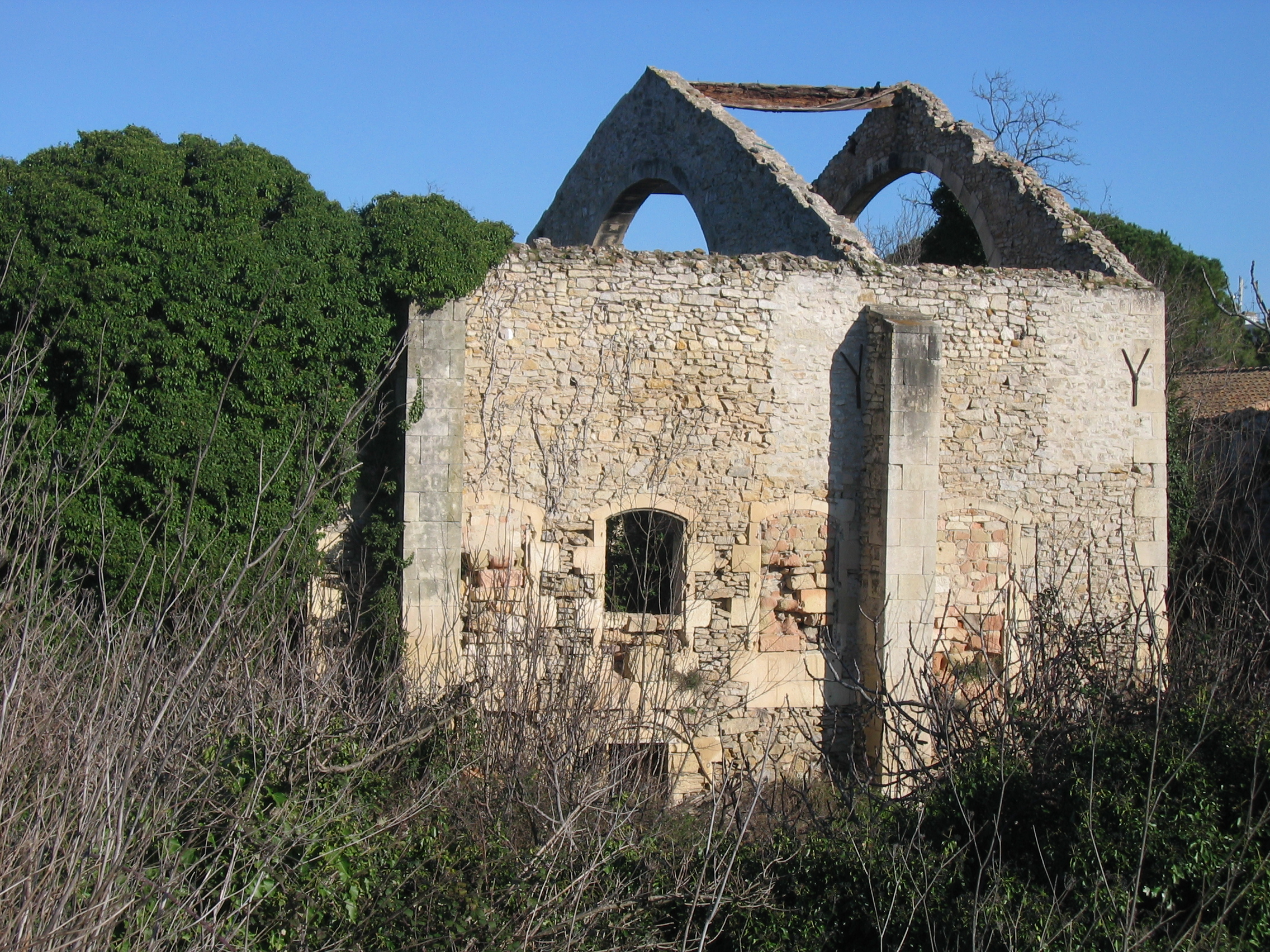
Great hall of the glassworks of Trinquetaille

The Verrerie de Trinquetaille (Trinquetaille glassware; Occitan: Vasijas de Trinquetaille) is a former factory of glass products, especially bottles, located in the district of Trinquetaille, in Arles, in the Bouches-du-Rhone. It is one of the few pre-industrial sites still visible in the region. The factory has produced glass jugs, such as Dame jeanne.

The Verrerie was only in operation for about twenty years as the Revolution and then the continental blockade made the cost of producing the glass prohibitive.

== History ==
During the first half of the 18th century, a white glass factory was installed in the Cavalerie district. Transferred to Trinquetaille, it was in operation for 6 years and was forced to close because the fuel (wood) is rare in the region, resulting in extra cost.

=== Successive owners ===
In 1782, a Norman glassmaker associated with two Arlesians: a merchant and a lawyer settled on the site, using existing buildings and creating new ones. This glassmaker chooses his installation in the region, for the use of local resources: sand of the Rhône and soda of the Camargue. The rental lease, with the owner of the premises, Mr. Datty, was signed on February 3, 1781, but the town council of the city of Arles gave its agreement of installation, only a year later, March 10, 1782 In the following week, the company "Grigniard et Cie" is definitively created for the management of glassware, a 9-year lease is confirmed with the owner. In spite of this contract, Mr. Datty sought to have the lease destroyed in 1785. After several months of legal attempts, he finally sold the land and buildings to the managing company for 11,000 livres.

In 1791, the three partners have not yet repaid their debts. The factory then passed into the hands of four Arlesian bourgeois. In 1791, only one owner owned the factory, Joseph Yvaren. Grignard and Boulouvard, two of the four Arlesian associates are arrested as royalists and guillotines on the Canebière.

In 1799, its activity stopped definitively: The unfavorable conjuncture (continental blockade, superimposition, revolutionary crisis) made its situation fragile. The cost of transporting coal prevented it from remaining competitive. The glass industry is held by the owners of mining sites. Following the destruction of the parish church of St Pierre de Trinquetaille during the Second World War, the large hall would have served as a church.

=== Current situation ===
In 1979, the city bought the site that served as a squat. The municipality Perrot wanted to raze the buildings except the large hall to build housing. In 1982, archaeological finds testifying to antique luxurious habitat were discovered. In 1987, the main hall was classified as a historic monument as of 11 December 1987. The other buildings were listed under Historic Monuments on the same date. In 1996, the building corresponding to the workers' quarters welcomes the new town hall annex. In 2014, a project of development is envisaged by the City council. In 2016, the roof consolidation works are implemented.

== Functioning of the Verrerie ==
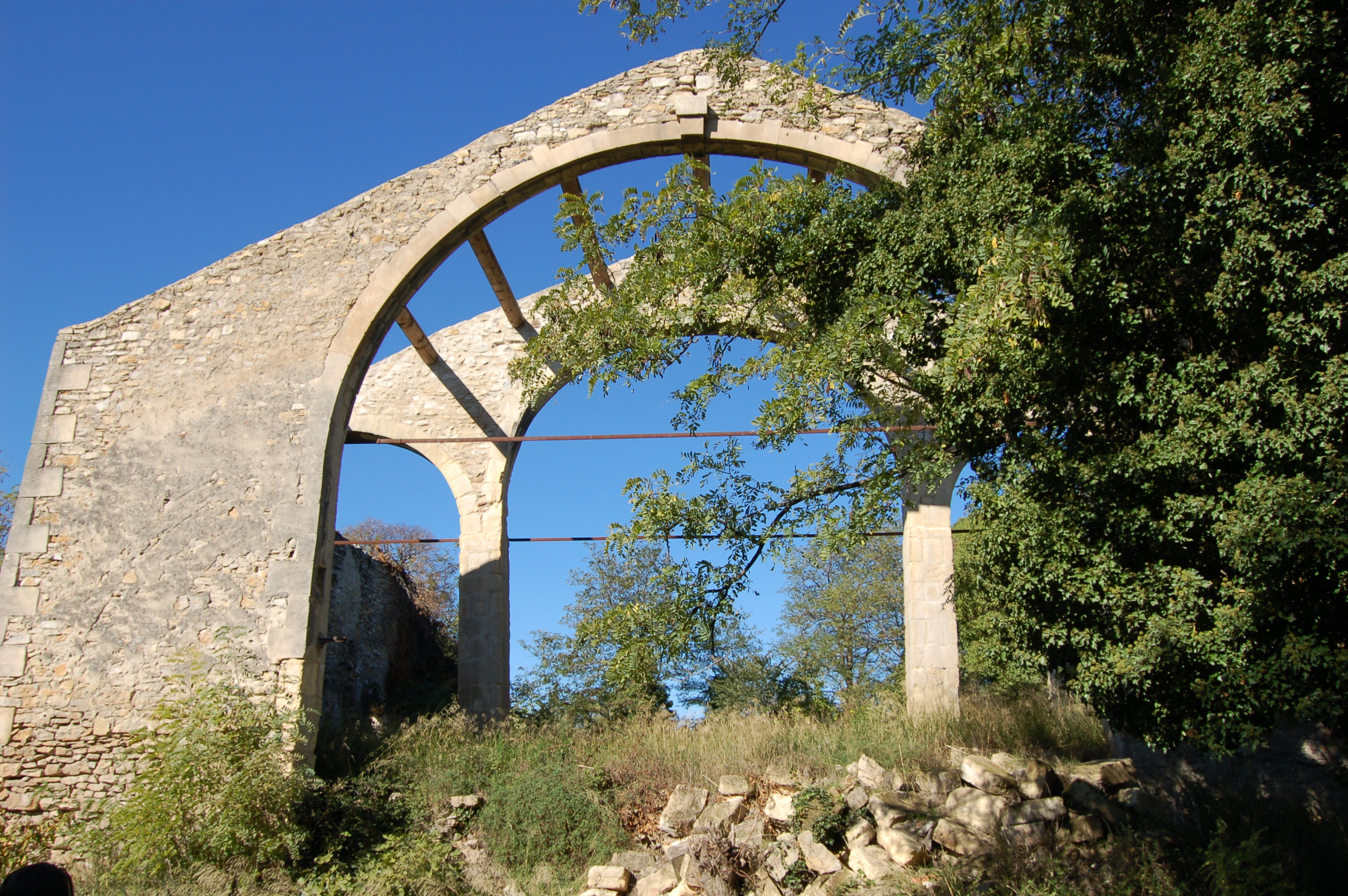
Great hall of the glassworks of Trinquetaille

This factory operated day and night (25 fonts per month), 6 to 7 months a year because in Provence operating a glassworks for the manufacture of 600 bottles per day was forbidden in summer. 40 people were housed on site. Here are the different trades that could be found there:

- the "kids" who go to get the sand (at the Île des Sables) and pick the glass (4),
- the blowing workers,
- the "big boys" who blow the glass coarsely (4),
- the master glassmaker who applied the finishing touches to the work,
- furnace operators (4),
- the site manager,
- the bottle carriers(4),
- shopkeepers (3),
- the moulder,
- the sifters (4 at least)

Making crucibles:

- a potter
- a man who walked the earth
- a lampworker

=== The production ===
This black glass (bottle glass) factory made from sand and soda (produced from the salicornia in the Camargue) produced ordinary bottles or "pints of Paris" (1/3), bordelaises (1/3 ) and 1/3 of very diverse products: oil bottles, English bottles, jugs, "lajeesjeannes", carafes. These containers thus produced are then transported by the Rhone, empty. A collection was organized before the annual opening of the factory to collect the "leached" ash and the broken glass of the households of Arles and its surroundings. The coal imported from Rives de Giers (Loire) was used as fuel (1440 tons in 1785). This production was then exported. For example, in 1793, out of 313,500 pieces, 96,000 were sold to the store, 73,000 in Genoa, 55,000 in Nice, 54,000 in Marseille, 34,000 in Sète and 15,000 in Toulouse. It is assumed that some of these pieces were exported to the Americas, the principal outlet for the glass-works of Provence.

== Architecture ==
The glassworks of Trinquetaille is made up of an initial hall, augmented by a building built between 1782 and 1785. The buildings are built of stone (stone of Beaucaire) and stone coated with lime. Building A is present before the large hall (building E) built in 1783 on a basilical plane sheltering two corridors of air circulation perpendicular around a central melting furnace. There were several annealing furnaces and crucibles.

== See also ==
- Archaeological site of the Trinquetaille glassware
