= Nord's 19th constituency =

Constituency of the National Assembly of France

19th constituency of the North
- inline Constituency of the National Assembly of France

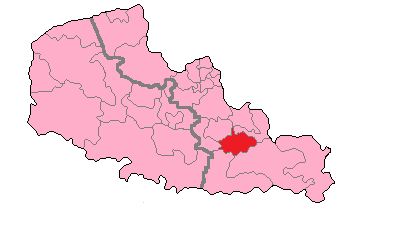
- Nord's 19th constituency shown within Nord-Pas-de-Calais
- Deputy: Sébastien Chenu; RN
- Department: Nord
- Cantons: Bouchain, Denain, Valenciennes-Sud (part).
- Registered voters: 79,055

Nord's nineteenth constituency is a French legislative constituency in the Nord département (in the far North of France). It is one of twenty-one in that département, and covers three cantons in whole or in part : Bouchain, Denain and Valenciennes-Sud (minus Valenciennes itself).

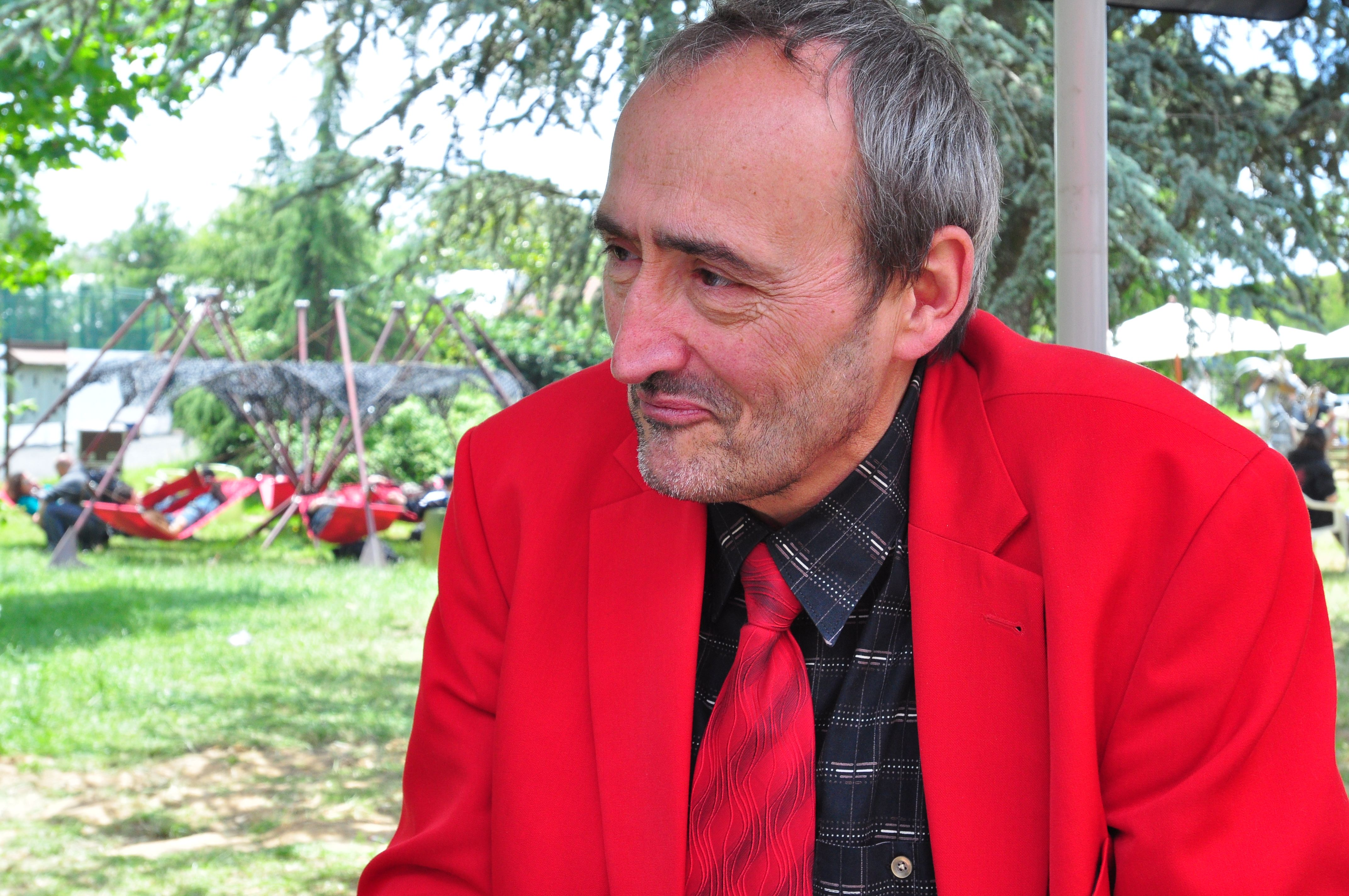
Patrick Roy, MP from 2002 until his death in 2011, known for his colourful clothes and love of heavy metal music.

== Deputies ==
This was a consistently left-wing constituency until 2017. It was long held by the French Communist Party prior to the 2002 election.

Election	Member	Party
1958	Pierre Carous	UNR
1962	Arthur Musmeaux	PCF
1967	Arthur Musmeaux	PCF
1968	Arthur Musmeaux	PCF
1973	Georges Donnez	MDSF
1978	Alain Bocquet	PCF
1981	Alain Bocquet	PCF
1986	Proportional representation - no election by constituency	
1988	Gustave Ansart	PCF
1990	René Carpentier	PCF
1993	René Carpentier	PCF
1997	Patrick Leroy	PCF
2002	Patrick Roy	PS
2007	Patrick Roy	PS
2011	Marie-Claude Marchand	PS
2012	Anne-Lise Dufour-Tonini	PS
2017	Sébastien Chenu	FN
2022	Sébastien Chenu	RN

== Election results ==
=== 2024 ===
->

Legislative Election 2024: Nord's 19th constituency
Party	Candidate	Votes	%	±%
LFI (NFP)	Cédric Brun	10,337	21.85	N/A
RN	Sébastien Chenu	27,592	58.32	+13.97
DVC (Ensemble)	Franck Watelet	7,136	15.08	N/A
DIV	Djemi Drici	1,150	2.43	N/A
LO	Cécile Bourlet	1,098	2.32	+.30
Turnout		47,313	97.05	39.90
Registered electors		80.890		
RN hold		Swing		

=== 2022 ===
Legislative Election 2022: Nord's 19th constituency
Party	Candidate	Votes	%	±%
RN	Sébastien Chenu	14,758	44.35	+11.14
PCF (NUPÉS)	Patrick Soloch	8,532	25.64	-11.03
LREM (Ensemble)	Emmanuel Cherrier	5,839	17.55	−0.53
UDI (UDC)	Bruno Raczkiewicz	1,106	3.32	−3.62
PA	Vincent Duquenne	971	2.92	N/A
REC	Christine Troia	813	2.44	N/A
LO	Cecile Bourlet	672	2.02	N/A
DIV	Djemi Drici	585	1.76	N/A
Turnout		33,276	42.29	
2nd round result
RN	Sébastien Chenu	17,451	57.15	+1.80
PCF (NUPÉS)	Patrick Soloch	13,085	42.85	N/A
Turnout		30,536	41.09	+0.53
RN hold				

=== 2017 ===
Candidate	Label	First round		Second round	
Candidate	Label	Votes	%	Votes	%
Sébastien Chenu	FN	11,839	33.21	16,013	55.35
Sabine Hebbar	MoDem	6,443	18.08	12,920	44.65
Anne-Lise Dufour-Tonini	PS	5,019	14.08		
Julien Poix	FI	4,573	12.83		
Pascal Jean	PCF	3,480	9.76		
Olivier Capron	LR	2,472	6.94		
Xavier Blottière	ECO	639	1.79		
Marlène Wrobel	EXG	439	1.23		
Serge Thomès	EXD	336	0.94		
Sébastien Dufour	DIV	243	0.68		
Saïda Bamoune	DVG	161	0.45		
Votes		35,644	100.00	28,933	100.00
Valid votes		35,644	97.74	28,933	90.20
Blank votes		607	1.66	2,176	6.78
Null votes		219	0.60	967	3.01
Turnout		36,470	46.11	32,076	40.56
Abstentions		42,631	53.89	47,011	59.44
Registered voters		79,101		79,087	
Source: Ministry of the Interior

=== 2012 ===
Legislative Election 2012: Nord's 19th constituency
Party	Candidate	Votes	%	±%
PS	Anne-Lise Dufour-Tonini	13,756	32.84	
FG	Michel Lefebvre*	10,137	24.20	
FN	Catherine Rouvier	8,215	19.61	
UMP	Olivier Capron	6,185	14.76	
DVG	Marie-Claude Marchand	1,067	2.55	
Others	N/A	2,530		
Turnout		41,890	52.99	
2nd round result
PS	Anne-Lise Dufour-Tonini	19,873	100.00	
Turnout		19,873	25.14	
PS hold				

* Withdrew before the 2nd round

=== 2007 ===
The constituency was one of just two (the other being Seine-Saint-Denis' 7th constituency) in which there was only one candidate in the second round, thus guaranteeing his re-election. The law provides that candidates obtaining the votes of at least 12.5% of registered voters in the first round advance to the second round. The parties of the mainstream left had a nationwide agreement whereby if two of them advanced to the second round, the second-placed would automatically withdraw. Primarily, this was to avoid dividing the left-wing or centre-left electorate in constituencies where a right-wing, centre-right or far-right candidate had also reached the second round. In the North's 19th constituency, however, as in 2002, the Socialist and Communist candidates were the only ones to reach the second round, respectively in first and second place. Communist candidate and former MP Patrick Leroy again honoured the agreement and withdrew, enabling Patrick Roy to be re-elected in a walkover. 24.4% of voters nonetheless cast a blank ballot.

=== 2007 ===
Legislative Election 2007: Nord's 19th constituency
Party	Candidate	Votes	%	±%
PS	Patrick Roy	14,648	32.82	
PCF	Patrick Leroy*	9,514	21.32	
UMP	Fatiha Rahaoui	6,344	14.21	
DVD	Jean-Claude Kikos	5,313	11.90	
FN	Serge Thomes	3,247	7.28	
MoDem	Antonio Notarianni	1,236	2.77	
Others	N/A	4,329		
Turnout		45,643	56.88	
2nd round result
PS	Patrick Roy	22,870	100.00	
Turnout		30,252	37.70	
PS hold				

* Withdrew before the 2nd round

=== 2002 ===
The constituency was one of just three (the others being Paris' 16th constituency and Nord's 16th constituency) in which there was only one candidate in the second round, thus guaranteeing his re-election. The law provides that candidates obtaining the votes of at least 12.5% of registered voters in the first round advance to the second round. The parties of the mainstream left had a nationwide agreement whereby if two of them advanced to the second round, the second-placed would automatically withdraw. Primarily, this was to avoid dividing the left-wing or centre-left electorate in constituencies where a right-wing, centre-right or far-right candidate had also reached the second round. In the North's 19th constituency, however, incumbent Communist MP Patrick Leroy and his Socialist challenger Patrick Roy were the only ones to reach the second round, respectively in second and first and place; Roy pipped Leroy to first place by fewer than 200 votes (0.43%). Leroy honoured the agreement and withdrew, enabling Roy and the Socialists to take the constituency in a walkover.

Legislative Election 2002: Nord's 19th constituency
Party	Candidate	Votes	%	±%
PS	Patrick Roy	11,649	25.85	
PCF	Patrick Leroy*	11,455	25.42	
UMP	Jean-Claude Kikos	8,356	18.54	
FN	Serge Thomes	7,691	17.07	
CPNT	Daniel Boda	1,182	2.62	
UDF	Maryse van Caneghem	1,059	2.35	
Others	N/A	3,673		
Turnout		46,107	59.12	
2nd round result
PS	Patrick Roy	20,973	100.00	
Turnout		28,925	37.09	
PS gain from PCF				

=== 1997 ===
Legislative Election 1997: Nord's 19th constituency
Party	Candidate	Votes	%	±%
PCF	Patrick Leroy	17,340	33.22	
PS	Michel François*	11,607	22.23	
FN	Serge Thomes	9,208	17.64	
RPR	Bernard Godin	7,778	14.90	
LO	Josiane Dubois	2,001	3.83	
DVD	Philippe Nenert	1,153	2.21	
Others	N/A	3,115		
Turnout		54,687	72.09	
2nd round result
PCF	Patrick Leroy	31,575	100.00	
Turnout		43,975	57.98	
PCF hold				

* Withdrew before the 2nd round
