= Trinquetaille =

Area in Arles, southern France

Coordinates: 43°40′50″N 4°37′20″E

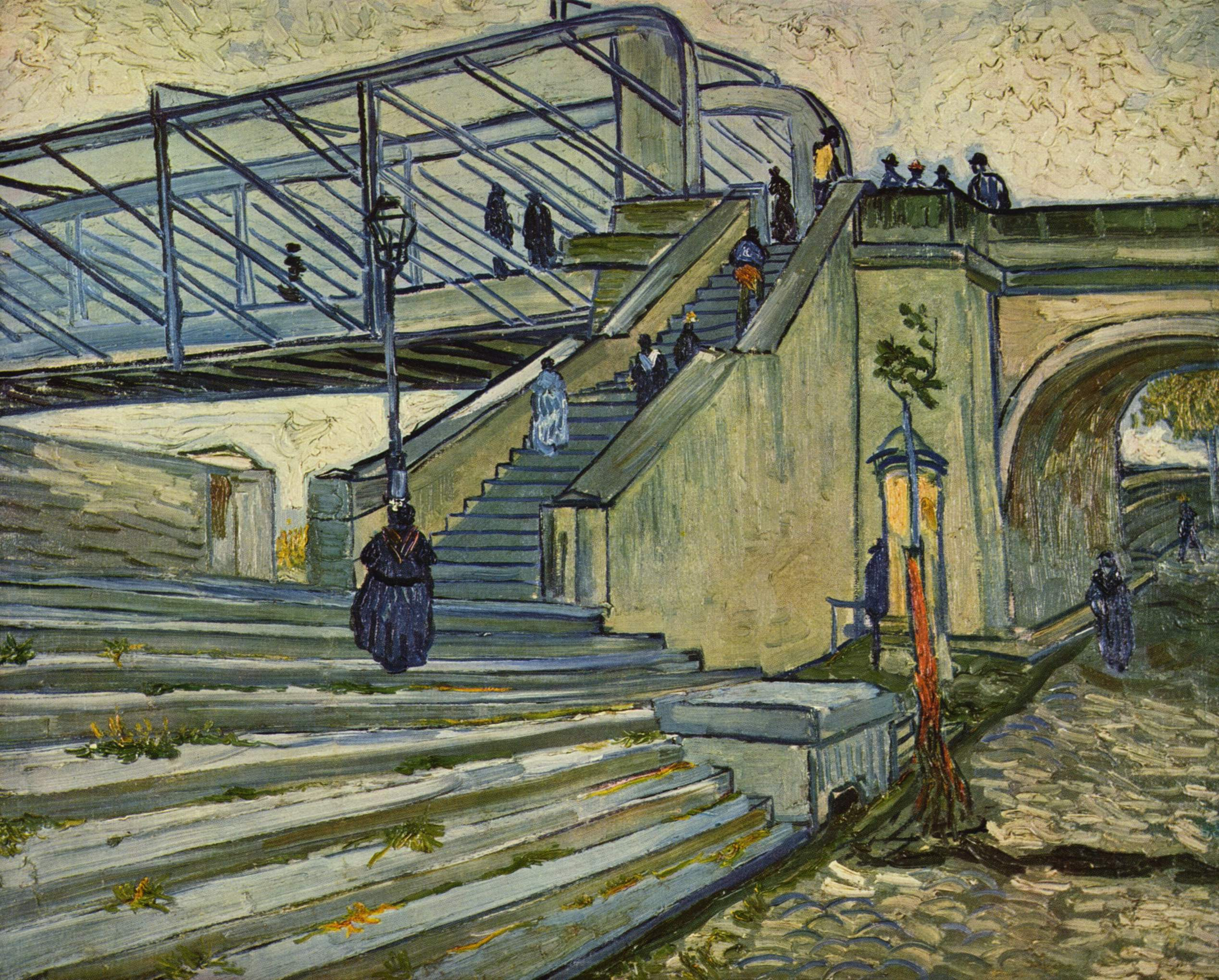
The bridge of Trinquetaille, by Vincent van Gogh, 1888

Trinquetaille is an area in the town of Arles, in southern France. It is located in the canton of Arles on the right bank of the "Grand Rhône". This position at the top of the Rhône delta makes it part of the Camargue.

In the Middle Ages it was the site of an important fortification, the base of the House of Baux. Trinquetaille Castle was razed in 1161 during the Baussenque Wars, but later rebuilt.

== See also ==
- Verrerie de Trinquetaille
- Archaeological site of the Trinquetaille glassware
