= Emmanuel Taché =

French politician

Member of the National Assembly for Bouches-du-Rhône's 16th constituency
- Incumbent
- Assumed office 22 June 2022
- Preceded by: Monica Michel

Personal details
- Born: 20 February 1975 (age 51) Montreuil, France
- Party: National Rally (2012-present)
- Other political affiliations: Union for a Popular Movement (2001-2012); Rally for the Republic (1995-2001)
- Spouse: Sébastien Chenu
- Occupation: Civil servant

Emmanuel Taché (French pronunciation: [emanɥɛl taʃe]; born 20 February 1975 in Montreuil) later assumed and is known by the name Emmanuel Taché de la Pagerie is a French politician of the National Rally and a Member of the National Assembly for Bouches-du-Rhône's 16th constituency since 2022.

== Biography ==
Taché was born in the "working-class Paris suburb of Montreuil" and worked in fashion and broadcasting before working in politics. Taché was a member of the Rally for the Republic and then the Union for a Popular Movement (UMP). He worked as a parliamentary assistant to the UMP deputy Brigitte Le Brethon. He is one of the founders of the GayLib association alongside his partner Sébastien Chenu. In 2022, he was elected to represent the Bouches-du-Rhône's 16th constituency, defeating incumbent En Marche! deputy Monica Michel.

Taché was finally condemned in September 2025 for having added to his birth surname of Taché the additional name "de la Pagerie", implying ancestry within the Tascher de la Pagerie noble family from which came Empress Joséphine.

His lawyers claimed that "it's perfectly normal in the art and communication sectors to use a pen name or preferred name", mentioning also that "it has been public knowledge for several decades".

The three daughters of the last male member of the family, who died in 1993, had stated that as Taché was not related to them, he is not entitled to use the name. In the legal proceedings they were seeking a symbolic one euro in damages, plus 500 euros a day should Taché continue to use the name; their lawyer stated that, despite the different spellings of Taché and Tascher, there remained "a risk of confusion in the eyes of the public."
