= Patrick Roy (politician) =

French politician

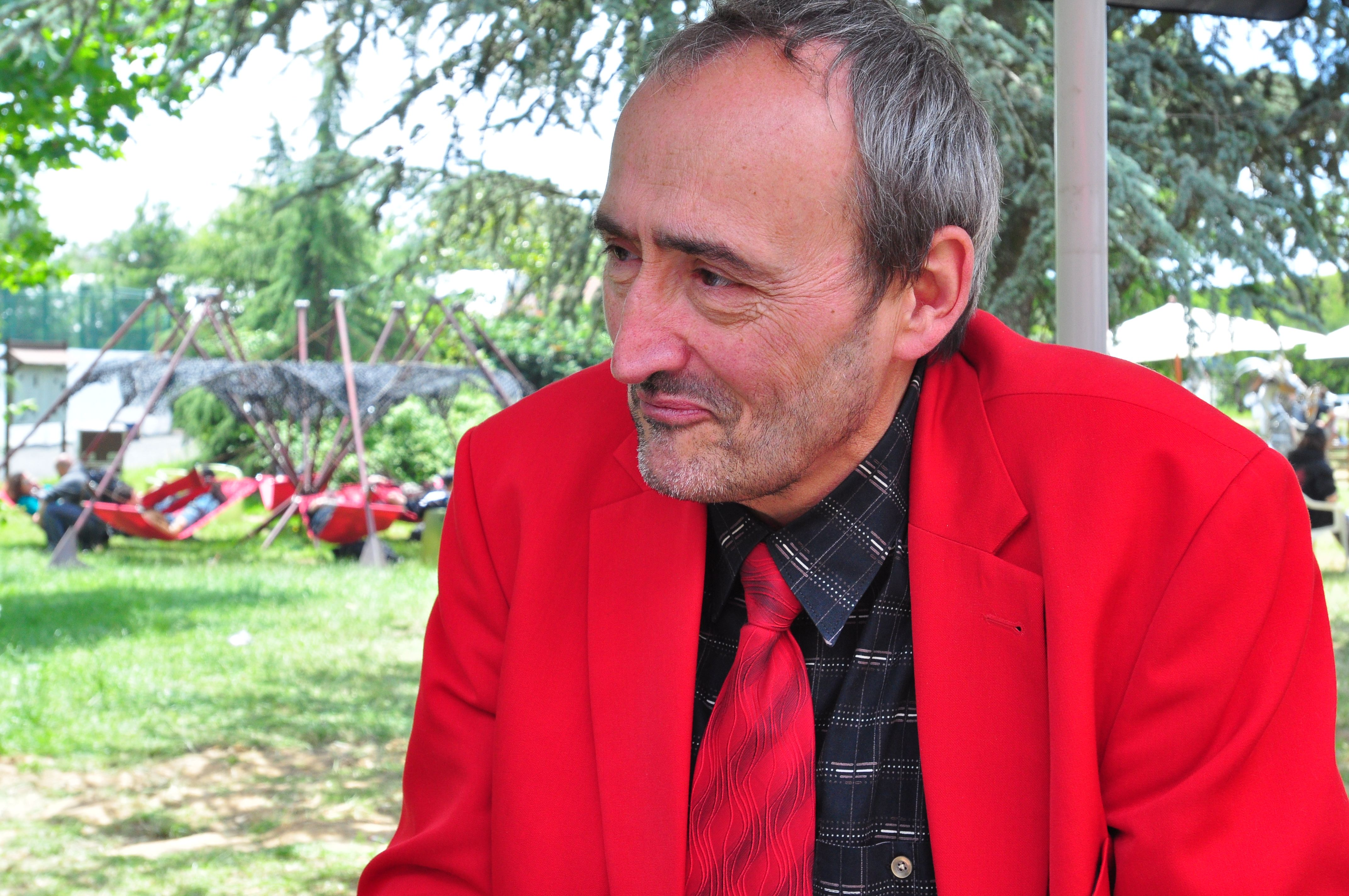
- Patrick Roy in 2010

Member of the National Assembly Nord's 19th constituency
- In office 18 June 2002 – 3 May 2011
- Preceded by: Patrick Leroy
- Succeeded by: Marie-Claude Marchand

Personal details
- Born: August 30, 1957 Denain, Nord, France
- Died: May 3, 2011 (aged 53) Valenciennes, Nord
- Cause of death: Pancreatic cancer
- Party: Socialist Party

Patrick Roy (August 30, 1957 – May 3, 2011) was a French politician, a member of the National Assembly. He represented the 19th constituency of the Nord département, and was a member of the French Socialist Party (PSF). He was also the mayor of Denain.

He was known for the colorful clothes he wore at the National Assembly and his love of heavy metal music, a musical style he defended on various occasions during the debates concerning the Hadopi law or the controversy about the Hellfest festival. On 5 June 2010, he joined the French metal band Mass Hysteria on stage during the Metallurgicales festival in Denain.

In November 2010, Roy revealed that he was suffering from a digestive cancer. In February 2011 he announced that he would come back to the National Assembly on March 15 and he did it, thanking the other congresswomen and congressmen for their support.

Patrick Roy died in Valenciennes on 3 May 2011 from pancreatic cancer. He was 53.
