= Église Saint-Pierre-de-Gallègue =

Church in Trinquetaille, France

Church of St. Pierre of Gallègue Église Saint-Pierre-de-Gallègue
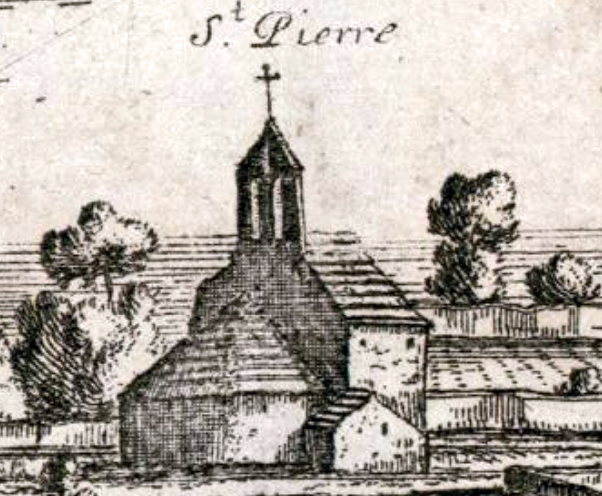
- Church of Saint Pierre (1660)

Religion
- Affiliation: Roman Catholic
- Region: Bouches-du-Rhône, Provence-Alpes-Côte d'Azur
- Ecclesiastical or organisational status: Church
- Status: Destroyed

Location
- Location: Arles, France
- Interactive map of Church of St. Pierre of Gallègue; Église Saint-Pierre-de-Gallègue
- Coordinates: 43.682°N 4.625°E

Architecture
- Type: Church
- Style: Romanesque architecture
- Groundbreaking: 11/12th century
- Completed: 12th century

L'Église Saint-Pierre-de-Gallègue was an old church which has since disappeared. It was situated in Trinquetaille on the right bank of the River Rhône across from Arles. The second church was built in the eleventh or twelfth century, near the remains of an older Roman church, and was destroyed at the end of the eighteenth century.

== History ==
The first monastery of Arles was established on the Isle of Gallègue in the time of the Dominate. It was likely founded by Hilary of Arles at the beginning of the 5th century, "in insula suburbana civitatis" defining the Isle of Gallègue as the location. Some historians now believe it to have been the Island of Cappe, which has since disappeared and was about two kilometres to the south-west of Arles. At the site of the monastery two churches are mentioned: the priory "Notre-Dame-la-Capella", or chapel "Notre-Dame-en-Gallègue", which was perhaps the old chapel for the Château des Baux, of which there remains no trace, and the church "Saint-Pierre-de-Gallègue".

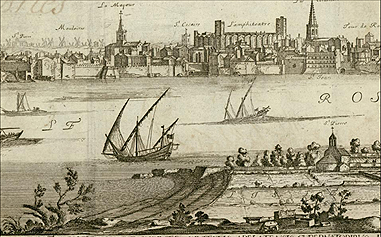
The church of Saint-Pierre-de-Gallègue abandoned in 1660 ; the Roman bridge is on the left of the village at the point of Trinquetaille.

This church was probably ruined by the conflict around the years 470-508 and was transferred a century later, in 546 or 547, to the left bank of the Rhône, in the Vieux-Bourg, in the reign of Childebert I and the archbishop Aurelianus of Arles.

During the Middle Ages, except possibly at the beginning of the ninth century, this area was totally abandoned, and there is no evidence of a church.

A second church was built in the quarter of "la Pointe" (to the north of Trinquetaille, where the Rhône separates into two streams), probably during the twelfth century. The House of Baux possessed a strong castle at Trinquetaille at the beginning of the twelfth century, and this may have included the church. The church was pillaged during the siege of Arles in 1240.

The church was abandoned around 1618 because the local inhabitants thought it was too far from the village because it had been moved upstream when the boat bridge was moved. The church was still known under the name of "Saint-Pierre-le-Vieux". It was then demolished in 1786 and razed entirely in 1872; its stones were used to build an enclosure around the cemetery, which marks its site.

The two churches of Saint-Pierre on a plan of 1743.

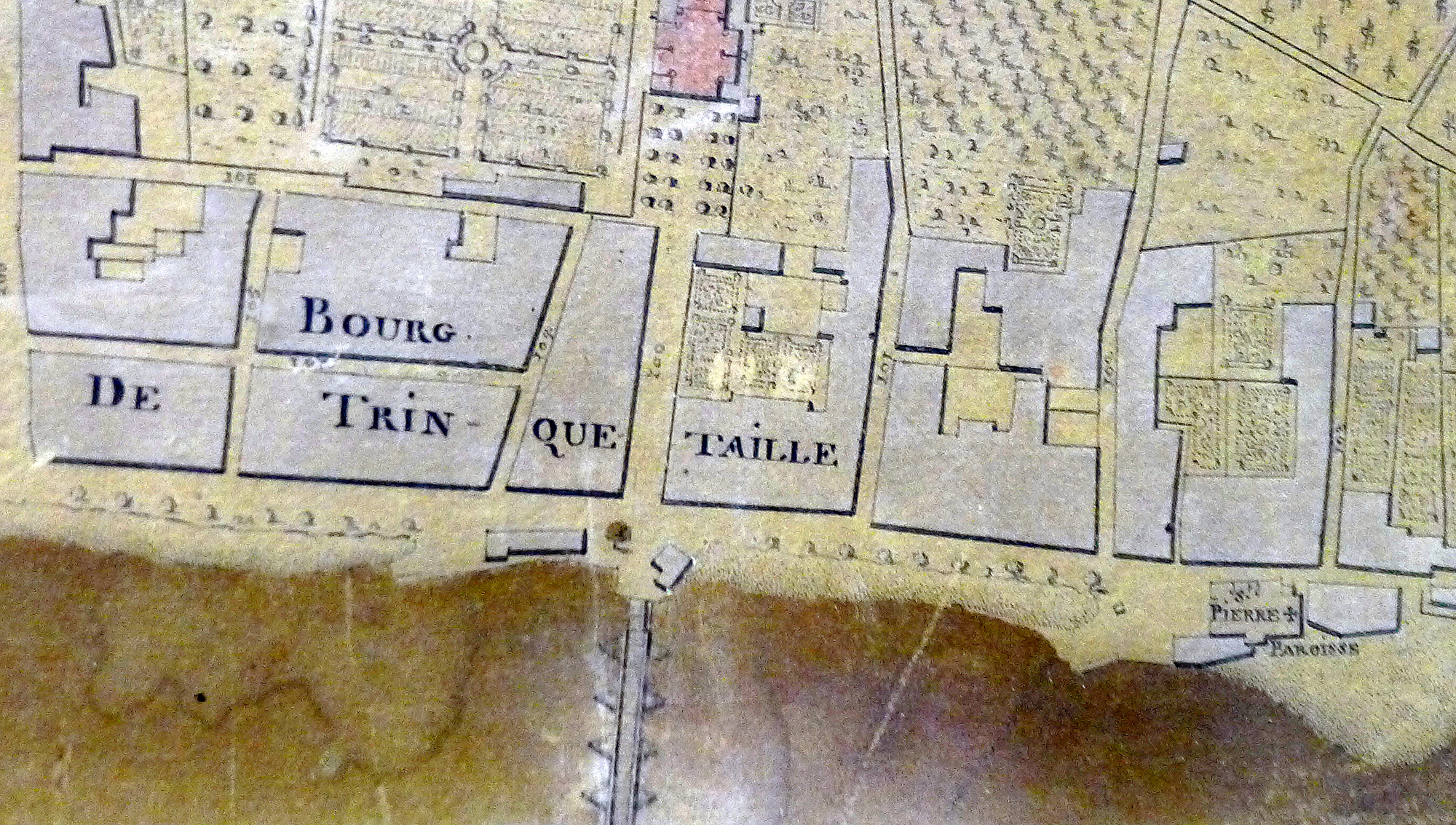
The new church of Saint-Pierre close to the modern bridge.

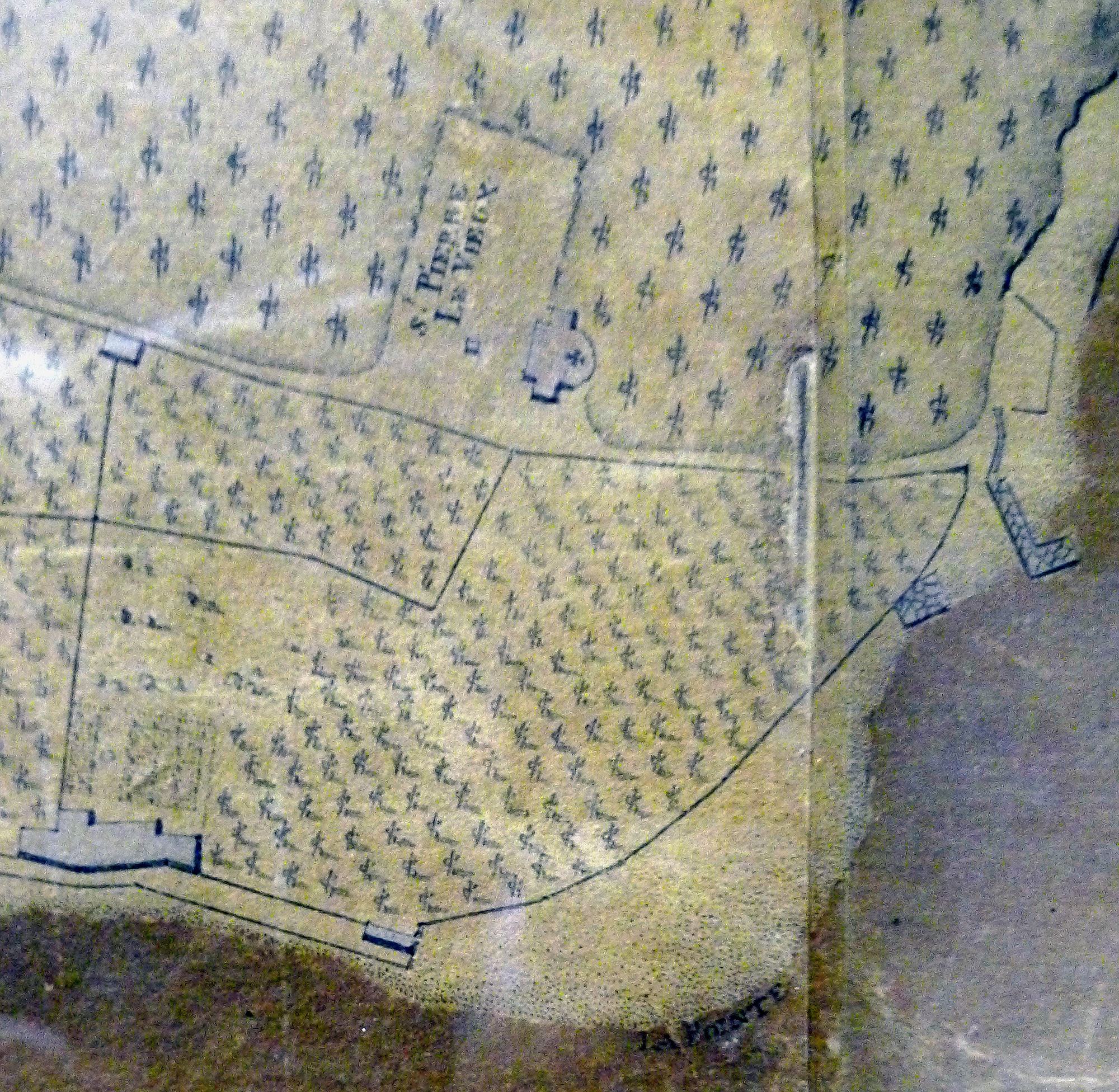
Saint-Pierre le Vieux near the cape, close to the ruins of the Roman bridge.
