= Archaeological site of the Trinquetaille glassware =

Archaeological site in Arles, France

Coordinates: 43.681582°N 4.62057°E

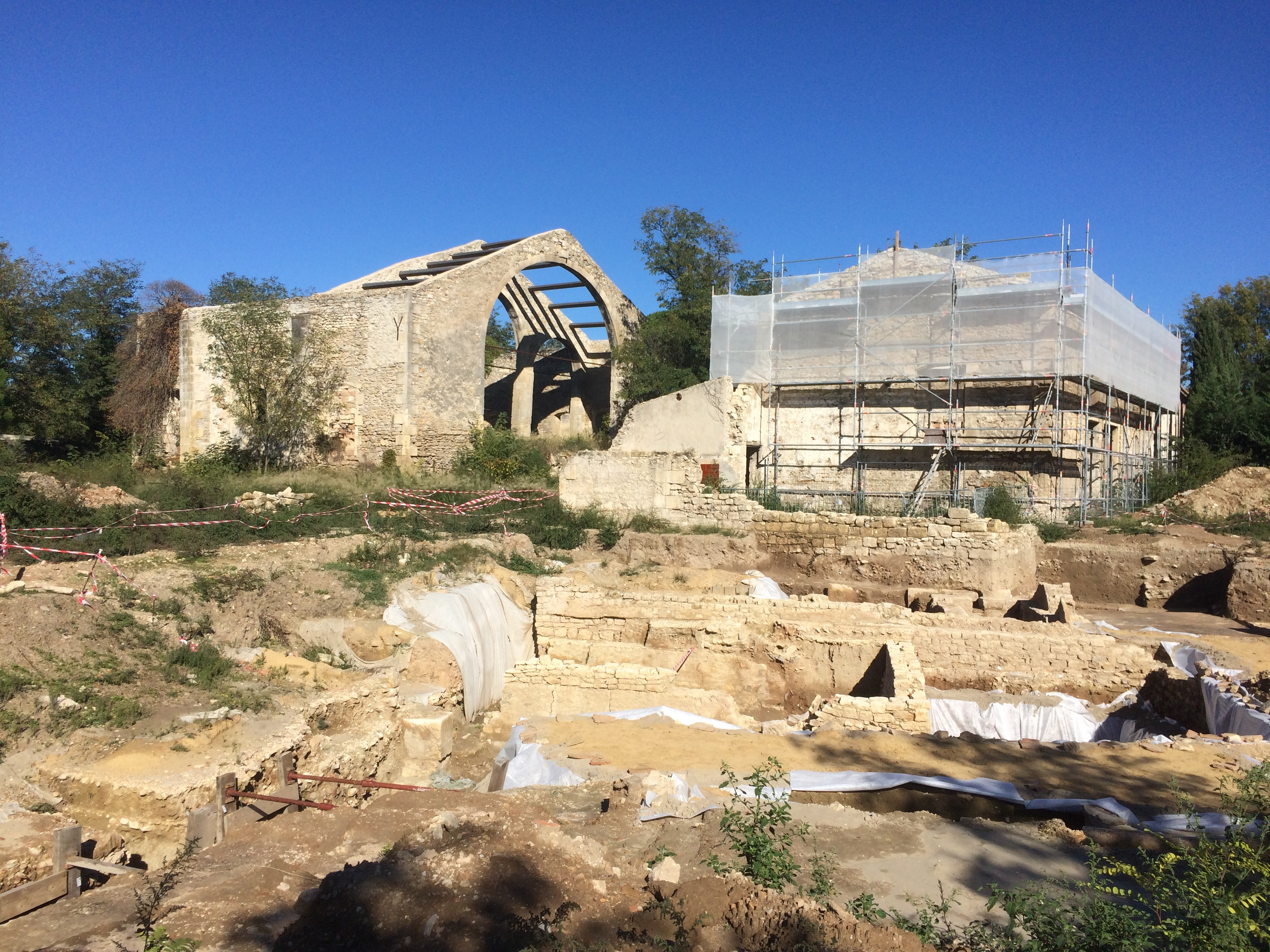
The archaeological site during excavations.

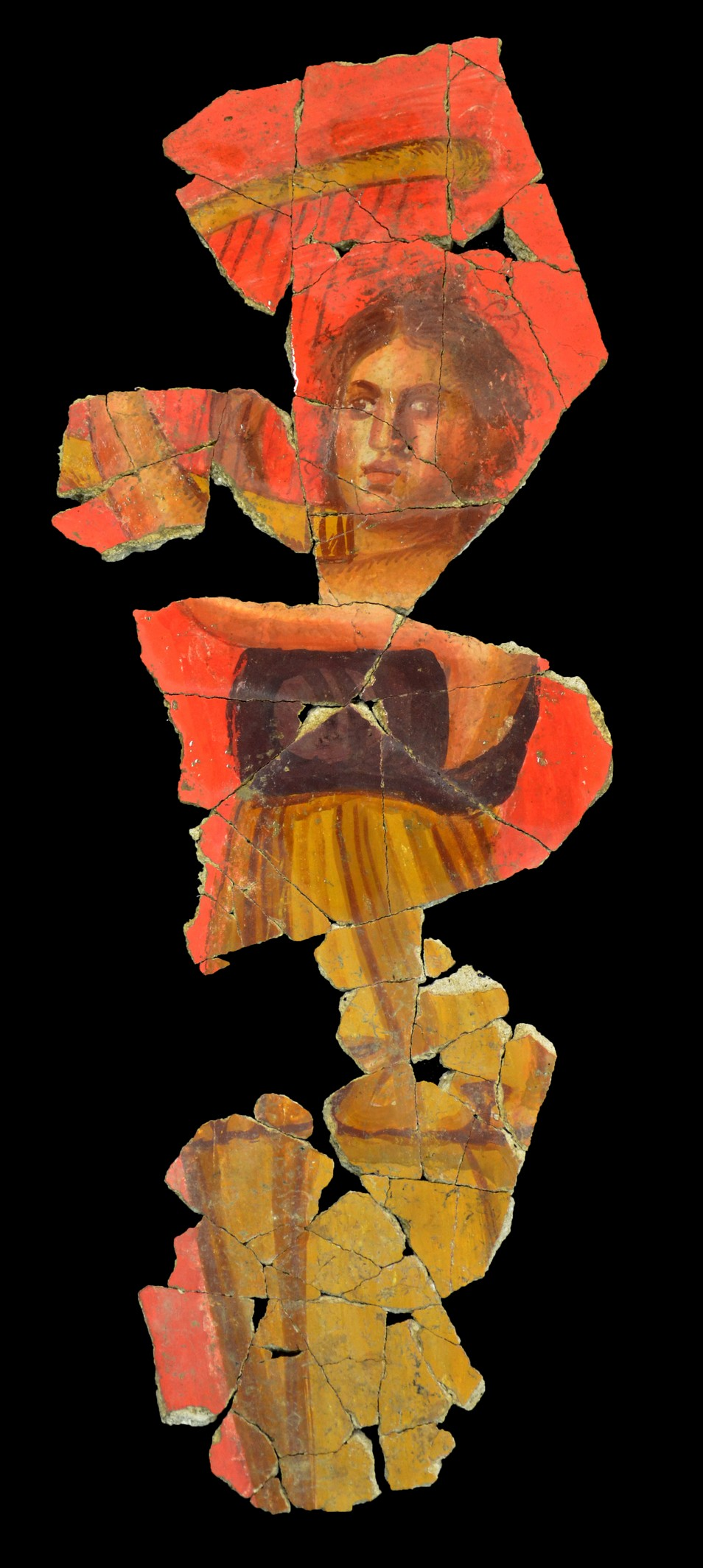
Fresco of the 2nd Pompeian style, discovered on the archaeological site of the Verrerie de Trinquetaille in Arles

The archaeological site of the Trinquetaille glassware in Trinquetaille has been acquired by the town council of Arles in 1978. It has been subject to archaeological excavations in the 1980s, and later since 2013, led by the Archaeology services of the Musée Départemental Arles Antique and the Inrap (National Preventive Archaeological Researches Institute), along with the contribution of the Ministère de la Culture et de la Communication, the CNRS (National Centre of Scientific Researches), the university and independent researchers.

== History ==
The archaeological site of the Verrerie de Trinquetaille, in the neighbourhood of Trinquetaille, is located on the right bank of the river Rhône in Arles, which was an occupied area during Antiquity. Excavations have revealed the area was inhabited from the 1st century BC to the 3rd century AD.

Recent excavations focused on a rich home dated back to the 1st century BC. Covered by later constructions, two adjoined rooms and an adjacent patio have been found. Archaeologists have discovered several painted decors, which were ornating floors, walls and ceilings; some of these fragments were still in place on the walls.

The style of these decors matches the 2nd Pompeian style, well known in Italy, specially in Pompeii, Boscoreale and Herculaneum. In Gaul, this ornament, dated from 70 BC to 30 BC, has, as far as we know, only been identified as such in the southern part of the territory, although it remains quite rare. This is the reason why the discoveries of the Verrerie can be considered as exceptional, regarding to the important painted surface which has been uncovered.

The hereby fresco, representing a harpist, can be shown as an example. This large portrayal is painted on a vermilion-red background, a highly expensive pigment. The quality of the figuration, the expressive looks, along with the depiction of the volumes and subtil lighting, show the artisan's mastery; the painter probably came from Italy, on request of the dominus.

A later occupation of the area is shown by the presence of other domus, as luxurious as the one just mentioned. Three large housing units have been excavated; they're gifted with marble pools and fountains, and vast rooms with mosaic decorated floors; one of them is provided with an underfloor heating system called hypocaust.

The Aiôn mosaic, dated from the 2nd century AD, is one of the most notable piece shown at the Musée Départemental Arles Antique. This tiling comes from a dining room (triclinium), and shows the god Annus – Aiôn, in Greek - in its central medallion: he is represented as source of vitality, which prevails to the renewal of seasons for eternity.

Around the end of the 3rd century AD, archaeology has proved that a violent destruction occurred, followed by the desertion of the area.
