= Sébastien Chenu =

French politician (born 1973)

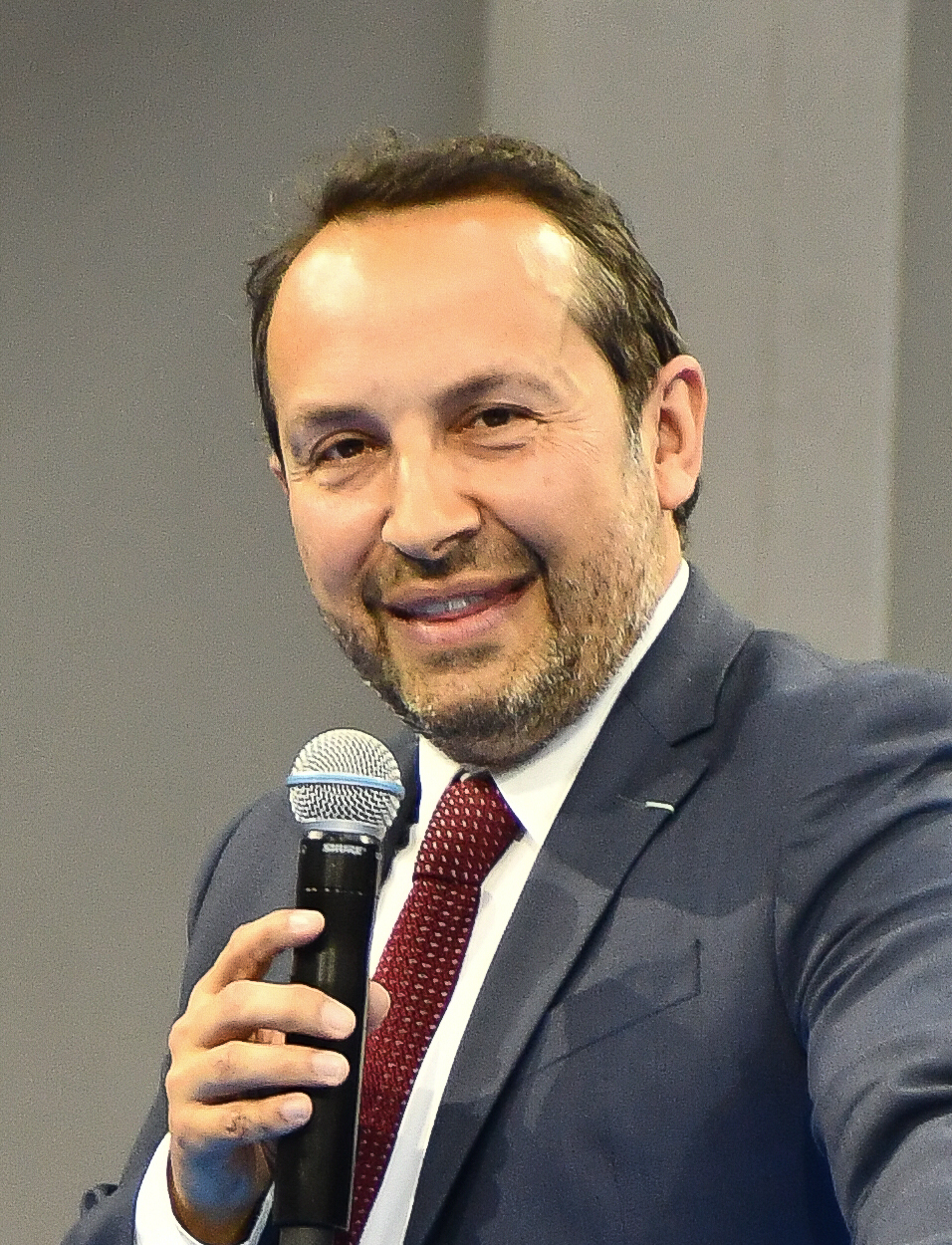

Member of the National Assembly for Nord's 19th constituency
- Incumbent
- Assumed office 21 June 2017
- Preceded by: Anne-Lise Dufour-Tonini

Vice-President of the National Assembly
- Incumbent
- Assumed office 1 October 2025
- Preceded by: Roland Lescure
- In office 29 June 2022 – 9 June 2024
- Preceded by: Marc Le Fur
- Succeeded by: Roland Lescure

Spokesman of the National Rally
- Incumbent
- Assumed office 21 September 2017 Serving with Julien Sanchez, Jordan Bardella (2017–2019) and Laurent Jacobelli (2019–present)
- President: Marine Le Pen; Jordan Bardella

Member of the Regional Council of Hauts-de-France
- Incumbent
- Assumed office 4 January 2016
- President: Xavier Bertrand

Personal details
- Born: 13 April 1973 (age 53) Beauvais, France
- Party: National Rally (since 2016)
- Other political affiliations: Republican Party (1988–1997); Liberal Democracy (1997–2002); UMP (2002–2014)
- Spouse: Emmanuel Taché
- Profession: Consultant

Sébastien Chenu (French pronunciation: [sebastjɛ̃ ʃəny]; born 13 April 1973) is a French Rassemblement National (RN) politician serving as the member of the National Assembly for the 19th constituency of Nord since 2017. A former member of the Union for a Popular Movement (UMP), in 2017 he switched parties to sit under the leadership of Marine Le Pen. He served as vice-president of the French National Assembly from 2022 to 2024 and again from 2025.

== Career ==
Openly homosexual, Chenu founded GayLib, then the LGBT wing of the Union for a Popular Movement (UMP), later part of the Union of Democrats and Independents (UDI). He joined the National Front (FN) after the UMP attempted to kill Law 2013-404, which legalised same-sex marriage, claiming that the UMP had become "the French Tea Party".

Chenu was a vice president of the Communauté d'agglomération du Beauvaisis from 2001 to 2014, when he served as a deputy to Mayor Caroline Cayeux of Beauvais.

Since 2016, he has been a regional councillor of Hauts-de-France.

=== Member of the National Assembly ===
In the 2017 legislative election, he was elected to the National Assembly in the 19th constituency of Nord.

For the 2021 regional election, Chenu was chosen to lead the National Rally list in Hauts-de-France.

Chenu won re-election to the Assemblée nationale in the 2022 French legislative election. He served as 5th vice-president of the French National Assembly.

On 12 November 2023, he took part in the March for the Republic and Against Antisemitism in Paris in response to the rise of anti-Semitism in France since the start of the Gaza war.

Chenu was re-elected in the 2024 French legislative election winning his reelection at the first round. On 26 June 2024 he said his party was hostile to the inclusion of Ukraine in the European Union.
