= Bouches-du-Rhône's 16th constituency =

Constituency of the National Assembly of France

16th constituency of Bouches-du-Rhône
- inline Constituency of the National Assembly of France

- Constituency in Bouches-du-Rhône Department (white area is the Étang de Berre lagoon)

- Bouches-du-Rhône in France
- Deputy: Emmanuel Taché; RN
- Department: Bouches-du-Rhône

The 16th constituency of Bouches-du-Rhône is a French legislative constituency in Bouches-du-Rhône.

== Deputies ==
Election	Member	Party
1993	Thérèse Aillaud	RPR
1997	Michel Vauzelle	PS
2002	Roland Chassain	UMP
2007	Michel Vauzelle	PS
2012	Michel Vauzelle	PS
2017	Monica Michel	LREM
2022	Emmanuel Tache De La Pagerie	RN
2024	Emmanuel Tache De La Pagerie	RN

== Elections ==
=== 2024 ===
Candidate	Party	Alliance	First round			Second round		
Candidate	Party	Alliance	Votes	%	+/–	Votes	%	+/–
Emmanuel Taché de la Pagerie	RN		28,179	47.12	+16.26	32,359	56.13	+1.19
Nicolas Koukas	PCF	NFP	17,896	29.92	-3.19	25,296	43.87	-1.19
Marion Biscione	RE	Ensemble	8,900	14.88	-10.09			
Alain Bernardet	LR	UDC	3,217	5.38	new			
Florent Seddik	REC		712	1.19	-5.69			
Guy Dubost	LO		505	0.84	-0.39			
Samir Bouziani	EAC		396	0.66	new			
Votes			59,805	100.00		57,655	100.00	
Valid votes			59,805	97.15	-0.08	57,655	92.74	+2.12
Blank votes			1,088	1.77	-0.16	3,283	5.28	-1.43
Null votes			667	1.08	+0.24	1,233	1.98	-0.69
Turnout			61,560	67.14	+22.37	62,171	67.79	+22.22
Abstentions			30,124	32.86	-22.37	29,536	32.21	-22.22
Registered voters			91,684			91,707		
Result			RN HOLD					

=== 2022 ===
Legislative election 2022: Bouches-du-Rhône's 16th constituency
Party	Candidate	Votes	%	±%
RN	Emmanuel Tache De La Pagerie	12,324	30.86	+2.43
PS (NUPÉS)	Christophe Caillault	10,673	26.73	+2.77
MoDem (Ensemble)	Mariana Caillaud	9,970	24.97	−2.03
REC	Jean-Guillaume Remise	2,746	6.88	N/A
DLF (UPF)	Valérie Laupies	1,440	3.61	+2.07
DVE	Grégory Sanchez	1,227	3.07	N/A
Others	N/A	1,554		
Turnout		41,071	44.77	−2.71
2nd round result
RN	Emmanuel Tache De La Pagerie	20,820	54.94	+6.11
PS (NUPÉS)	Christophe Caillault	17,077	45.06	N/A
Turnout		37,897	45.57	+2.03
RN gain from LREM				

=== 2017 ===
Candidate	Label	First round		Second round	
Candidate	Label	Votes	%	Votes	%
Valérie Laupies	FN	11,951	28.43	17,505	48.83
Monica Michel	REM	11,351	27.00	18,341	51.17
Gérard Géron	FI	6,662	15.85		
Marie-Pierre Callet	LR	5,734	13.64		
Nora Mebarek	PS	2,447	5.82		
François Vignaud	DIV	1,142	2.72		
Alice Greetham	ECO	961	2.29		
Laura Tamborini	DLF	646	1.54		
Guy Dubost	EXG	435	1.03		
Catherine Sibert	DIV	310	0.74		
Cyrille Ragonet	DIV	209	0.50		
Rachid Mokran	ECO	120	0.29		
Jules-Adrien Griffoul	DIV	71	0.17		
Votes		42,039	100.00	35,846	100.00
Valid votes		42,039	97.71	35,846	90.85
Blank votes		669	1.55	2,412	6.11
Null votes		315	0.73	1,198	3.04
Turnout		43,023	47.48	39,456	43.54
Abstentions		47,598	52.52	51,158	56.46
Registered voters		90,621		90,614	
Source: Ministry of the Interior

=== 2012 ===
Summary of the 10 June and 17 June 2012 French legislative election in Bouches-du-Rhône’s 16th constituency
Candidate	Party		1st round		2nd round	
Candidate	Party		Votes	%	Votes	%
Michel Vauzelle	Socialist Party	PS	19,828	38.40%	26,814	51.29%
Valérie Laupies	Front National	FN	14,967	28.98%	25,469	48.71%
Roland Chassain	Union for a Popular Movement	UMP	11,681	22.62%		
Emmanuelle Bonhomme	Left Front	FG	3,425	6.63%		
Salim Djerari	Europe Ecology – The Greens	EELV	1,217	2.36%		
Guy Dubost	Far Left	EXG	260	0.50%		
Bernard Pignolo	Ecologist	ECO	145	0.28%		
Christian Regis	Far Left	EXG	115	0.22%		
Mireille Haas	Far Right	EXD	0	0.00%		
Total			51,638	100%	52,283	100%
Registered voters			88,594		88,592	
Blank/void ballots			776	1.48%	2,182	4.01%
Turnout			52,414	59.16%	54,465	61.48%
Abstentions			36,180	40.84%	34,127	38.52%
Result					PS HOLD	

=== 2007 ===
Summary of the 10 June and 17 June 2007 French legislative election in Bouches-du-Rhône’s 4th constituency
Candidate	Party		1st round		2nd round	
Candidate	Party		Votes	%	Votes	%
Michel Vauzelle	Socialist Party	PS	16,289	32.39%	27,352	52.32%
Roland Chassain	Union for a Popular Movement	UMP	19,819	39.41%	24,923	47.68%
Jean-Marc Charrier	Communist	PCF	3,625	7.21%		
Viviane Ricard	Front National	FN	3,335	6.63%		
Gilles Ayme	Democratic Movement	MoDem	2,323	4.62%		
Bruno Leclerc	Far Left	EXG	1,043	2.07%		
Jean-Marie Scifo	Hunting, Fishing, Nature, Traditions	CPNT	1,010	2.01%		
Naïma Fettal	The Greens	VEC	552	1.10%		
Jean-Flora Nosibor	Ecologist	ECO	445	0.88%		
Michel Psychopoulos	Movement for France	MPF	421	0.84%		
Laurence Deleuze	Far Left	EXG	320	0.64%		
Jean-Noël Houssais	Far Right	EXD	294	0.58%		
Guy Dubost	Far Left	EXG	265	0.53%		
Andrée D'Agostino	Ecologist	ECO	257	0.51%		
Chantal Valette	Independent	DIV	195	0.39%		
Romain Bodo	Miscellaneous Right	DVD	100	0.20%		
Total			50,293	100%	52,275	100%
Registered voters			84,630		84,621	
Blank/void ballots			844	1.65%	1,584	2.94%
Turnout			51,137	60.42%	53,859	63.65%
Abstentions			33,493	39.58%	30,762	36.35%
Result					PS GAIN	

=== 2002 ===
Legislative Election 2002: Bouches-du-Rhône's 16th constituency
Party	Candidate	Votes	%	±%
PS	Michel Vauzelle	17,942	36.10	
UMP	Roland Chassain	15,212	30.61	
FN	Jeannie Audoly	9,842	19.80	
CPNT	Jean-Marie Scifo	2,320	4.67	
MNR	Jean-Noel Houssains	1,035	2.08	
Others	N/A	3,351		
Turnout		50,868	64.06	
2nd round result
UMP	Roland Chassain	23,439	50.98	
PS	Michel Vauzelle	22,540	49.02	
Turnout		48,471	61.05	
UMP gain from PS				

=== 1997 ===
Legislative Election 1997: Bouches-du-Rhône's 16th constituency
Party	Candidate	Votes	%	±%
PS	Michel Vauzelle	13,136	25.79	
FN	Gérard David	11,345	22.27	
RPR	Thérèse Aillaud	11,081	21.75	
PCF	Georges Thorrand	9,141	17.94	
DVD	Monique Doustaly	1,304	2.56	
LV	Roger Perrayon	1,160	2.28	
LO	Guy Dubost	1,098	2.16	
Others	N/A	2,679		
Turnout		53,145	70.14	
2nd round result
PS	Michel Vauzelle	27,217	49.58	
RPR	Thérèse Aillaud	16,515	30.08	
FN	Gérard David	11,163	20.34	
Turnout		56,930	75.13	
PS gain from RPR				
