= Canton of Arles =

Coordinates: 43.68°N 4.63°E

Arles
- Canton
- Interactive map of Arles
- Country: France
- Region: Provence-Alpes-Côte d'Azur
- Department: Bouches-du-Rhône
- No. of communes: {{{nbcomm}}}

Government
  - Representatives (2021–2028): Martial Alvarez; Mandy Graillon
- Area: 1,206.92 km^{2} (465.99 sq mi)
- Population (2023): 62,817
  - Density: 52.047/km^{2} (134.80/sq mi)
- INSEE code: 13 04

The canton of Arles is an administrative division of the Bouches-du-Rhône department, in southeastern France. It was created at the French canton reorganisation which came into effect in March 2015. Its seat is in Arles.

== Composition ==
It consists of the following communes:

1. Arles
2. Port-Saint-Louis-du-Rhône
3. Saintes-Maries-de-la-Mer

== Councillors ==
Election	Councillors	Party	Occupation
2015	Nicolas Koukas	PCF	Councillor of Arles
2015	Aurore Raoux	PCF	Councillor of Port-Saint-Louis-du-Rhône
2021	Martial Alvarez	DVC	Mayor of Port-Saint-Louis-du-Rhône
2021	Mandy Graillon	DVC	Councillor of Arles

== Pictures of the canton ==
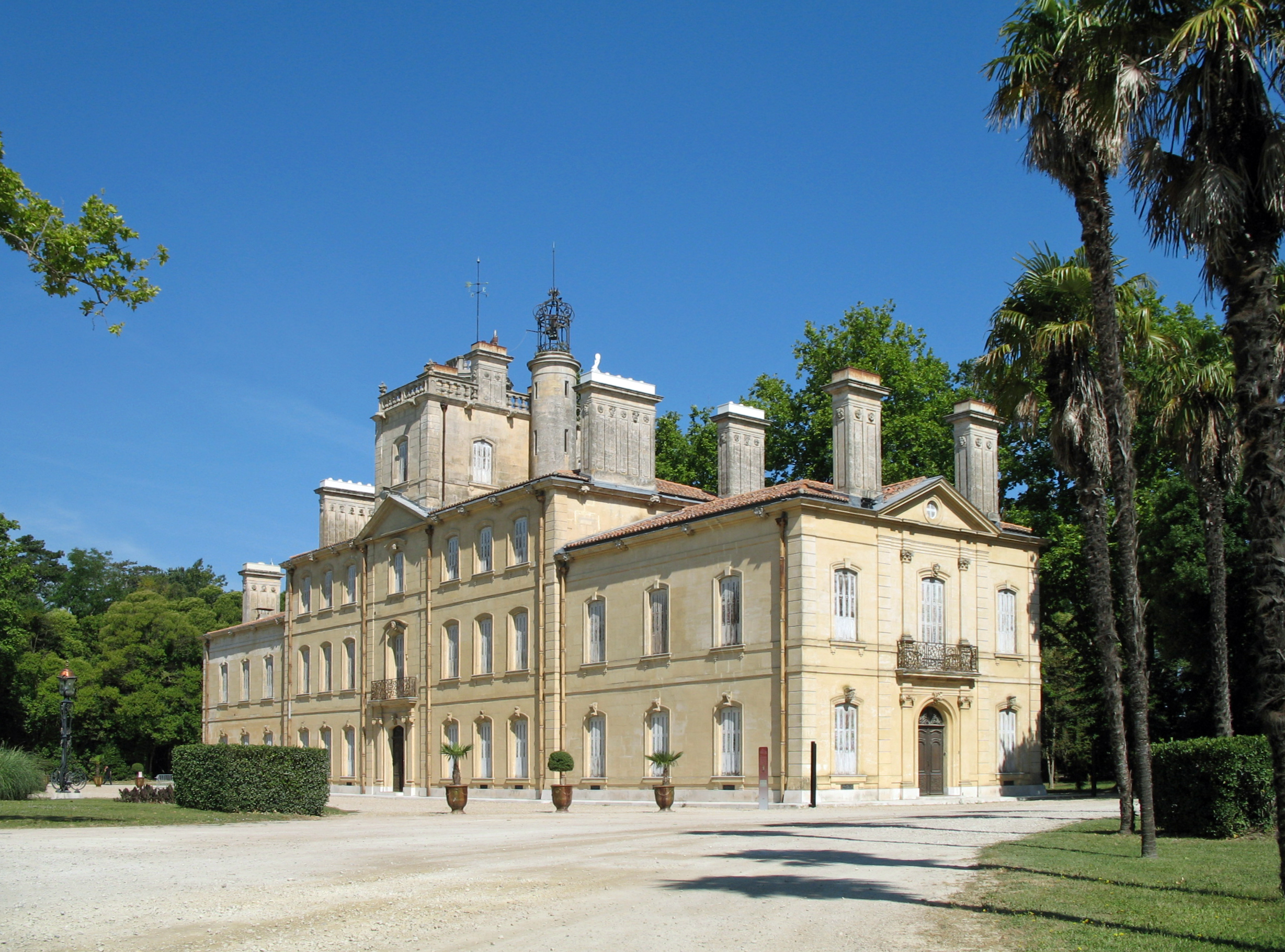
The Chateau d'Avignon in Saintes-Maries-de-la-Mer

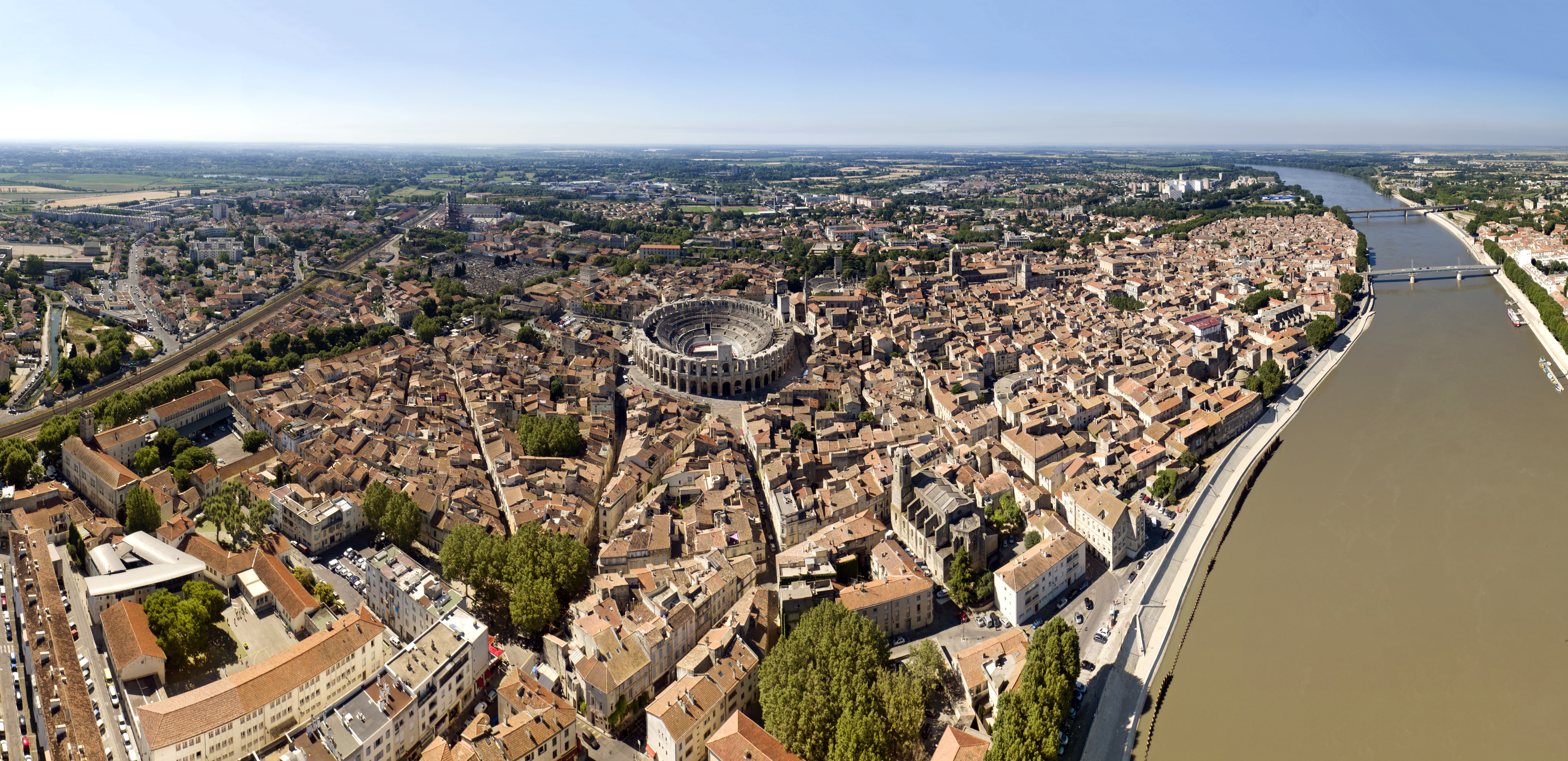
View of Arles

== See also ==
- Canton of Saintes-Maries-de-la-Mer
