= Roland Chassain =

French politician (1947–2021)

Mayor of Saintes-Maries-de-la-Mer
- In office 24 June 1995 – 9 February 2021
- Preceded by: Hubert Manaud
- Succeeded by: Christelle Aillet

Member of the National Assembly for Bouches-du-Rhône's 16th constituency
- In office 19 June 2002 – 19 June 2007
- Preceded by: Michel Vauzelle
- Succeeded by: Michel Vauzelle

General councillor of Bouches-du-Rhône
- In office 28 March 1994 – 1 April 2015
- Preceded by: Hubert Manaud
- Succeeded by: Nicolas Koukas

Personal details
- Born: 5 February 1947 Aurillac, France
- Died: 9 February 2021 (aged 74) Saintes-Maries-de-la-Mer, France
- Party: RPR; UMP; The Republicans

Roland Chassain (5 February 1947 – 9 February 2021) was a French politician.

== Biography ==
Chassain served as Deputy for Bouches-du-Rhône's 16th constituency in the 12th legislature of the Fifth French Republic as a member of the Union for a Popular Movement. As a member of the National Assembly, he fought for the reestablishment of the death penalty for acts of terrorism. However, the Constitution of France was rewritten in 2007 to eliminate the death penalty. That year, he was defeated by Michel Vauzelle of the Socialist Party.

Chassain ran again in 2012, but withdrew in favor of the National Front candidate and rallying voters against Michel Vauzelle, though Vauzelle retained the seat.

During the 2012 Union for a Popular Movement leadership election, Chassain supported Jean-François Copé to be leader of the party. Following a contested election, he called for Nicolas Sarkozy to be President of the UMP, and for Copé and François Fillon to be co-presidents. In a December 2012 interview with Minute, Chassain called for more unity between the UMP and the National Front.

Roland Chassain died on 9 February 2021 at the age of 74, four days after his birthday.

== Distinctions ==
- Knight of the Legion of Honour (2009)
