= Monica Michel =

French politician

Member of the National Assembly for Bouches-du-Rhône's 16th constituency
- In office 21 June 2017 – 21 June 2022
- Preceded by: Michel Vauzelle
- Succeeded by: Emmanuel Taché

Personal details
- Born: 16 April 1955 (age 70) Victoria, Seychelles
- Party: La République En Marche!
- Children: 3

Monica Michel (born 16 April 1955) is a French politician of La République En Marche! (LREM) who served as the member of the National Assembly from 2017 to 2022, representing the 16th district of Bouches-du-Rhône.

== Early life and career ==
Born in the Seychelles in 1955, Michel lived on Réunion, in Paris and Marseille before settling in Arles. In the early 2000s, she began working for Marseille-Fos Port where she held the position of commercial director for 18 years.

== Political career ==
Michel joined LREM in 2017.

In parliament, Michel served on the Defence Committee. In addition to her committee assignments, she was a member of the French-Australian Parliamentary Friendship Group and the French-Indian Parliamentary Friendship Group.

In late 2019, Michel was one of 17 members of the committee who co-signed a letter to Prime Minister Édouard Philippe in which they warned that the 365 million euro ($406 million) sale of aerospace firm Groupe Latécoère to U.S. fund Searchlight Capital raised “questions about the preservation of know-how and France’s defence industry base” and urged government intervention.

In 2020, Michel joined En commun (EC), a group within LREM led by Barbara Pompili.
