= Michel Vauzelle =

French politician (born 1944)

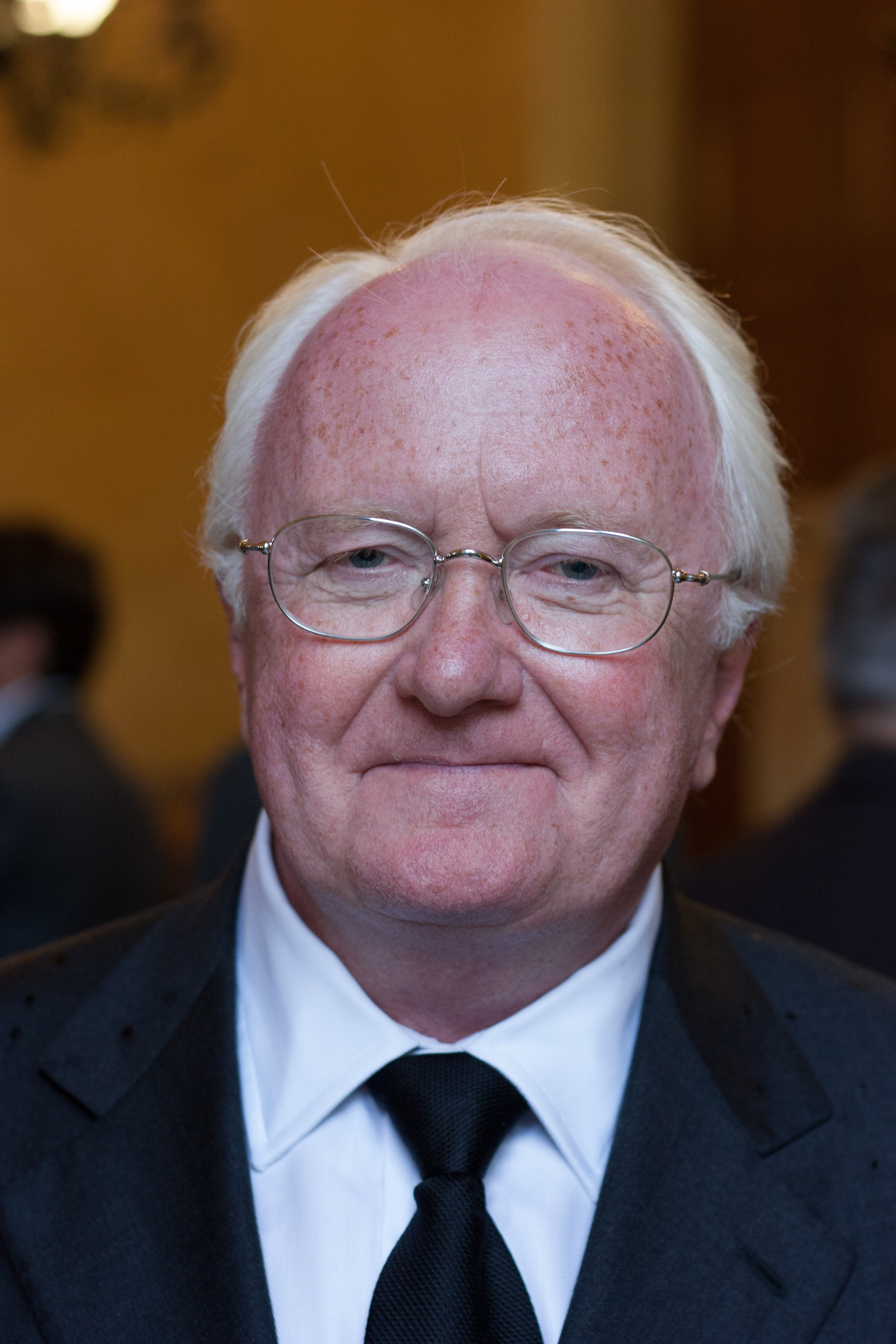

President of the Regional Council of Provence-Alpes-Côte d'Azur
- In office 23 March 1998 – 18 December 2015
- Preceded by: Jean-Claude Gaudin
- Succeeded by: Christian Estrosi

Mayor of Arles
- In office 18 June 1995 – 15 March 1998
- Preceded by: Jean-Paul Camoin
- Succeeded by: Paolo Toeschi

Keeper of the Seals, Minister of Justice
- In office 2 April 1992 – 29 March 1993
- President: François Mitterrand
- Prime Minister: Pierre Bérégovoy
- Preceded by: Henri Nallet
- Succeeded by: Pierre Méhaignerie

Deputy of the National Assembly for Bouches-du-Rhône
- In office 20 June 2007 – 20 June 2017
- Preceded by: Roland Chassain
- Succeeded by: Monica Michel
- Constituency: 16th
- In office 12 June 1997 – 19 June 2002
- Preceded by: Thérèse Aillaud
- Succeeded by: Roland Chassain
- Constituency: 16th
- In office 2 April 1986 – 2 May 1992
- Preceded by: Proportional representation
- Succeeded by: François Bernardini
- Constituency: At-large (1986–1988); 16th (1988–1992)

Personal details
- Born: 15 August 1944 (age 82) Montélimar, France
- Party: Socialist Party
- Education: Sciences Po
- Profession: Lawyer, politician

Michel Vauzelle (French pronunciation: [miʃɛl vozɛl]; born 15 August 1944) is a French politician who served as Keeper of the Seals of France, Minister of Justice under Prime Minister Pierre Bérégovoy from 1992 to 1993. A member of the Socialist Party (PS), he also served as Mayor of Arles from 1995 to 1998 and President of the Regional Council of Provence-Alpes-Côte d'Azur from 1998 until 2015.

A native of Montélimar, Vauzelle was a Member of Parliament (MP) for Bouches-du-Rhône from 1986 to 1992 and again from 1997 to 2002 and 2007 to 2017. He was first elected at-large (1986–1988), before representing the department's 16th constituency. In 2007, he defeated Union for a Popular Movement (UMP) incumbent Roland Chassain who had previously defeated him in 2002. Vauzelle, who had a narrower victory against a National Front (FN) candidate in 2012, did not contest the 2017 legislative election, in which the seat was won by Monica Michel of La République En Marche! (LREM), a first-time candidate.

== Honours ==
- On 26 September 2016, Vauzelle was awarded the Plaque rank of the Order of the Aztec Eagle by the then president of Mexico, Enrique Peña Nieto.
