= Port-Saint-Louis-du-Rhône =

Commune in Provence-Alpes-Côte d'Azur, France

- Commune
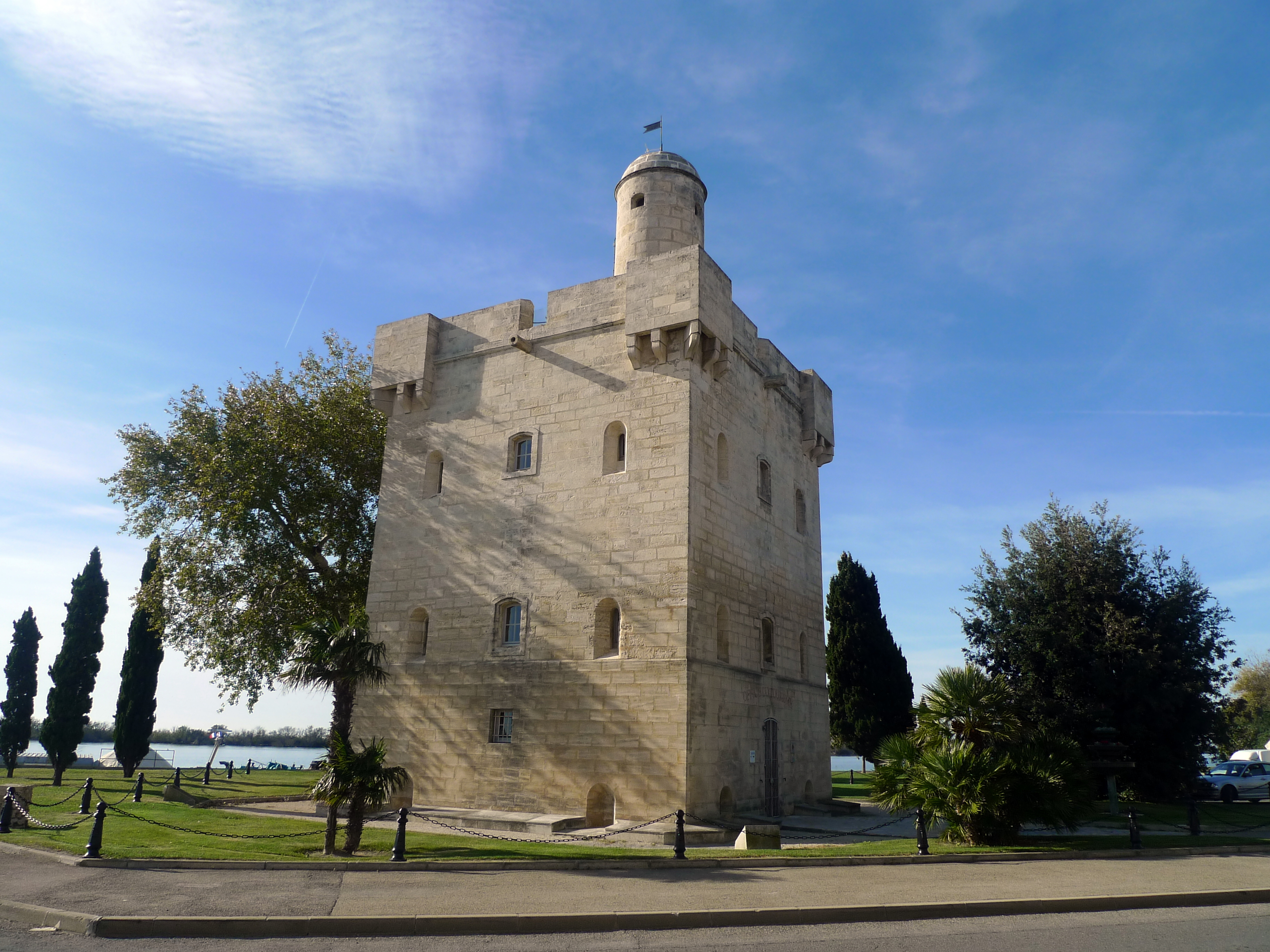
- The 18th century Saint Louis tower

- Coat of arms
- Location of Port-Saint-Louis-du-Rhône
- Location within France Location within Provence-Alpes-Côte d'Azur
- Coordinates: 43°23′15″N 4°48′14″E
- Country: France
- Region: Provence-Alpes-Côte d'Azur
- Department: Bouches-du-Rhône
- Arrondissement: Istres
- Canton: Arles
- Intercommunality: Aix-Marseille-Provence

Government
  - Mayor (2026–32): Martial Alvarez
- Area^{1}: 73.38 km^{2} (28.33 sq mi)
- Highest elevation: 3 m (9.8 ft)
- Lowest elevation: 0 m (0 ft)
- Population (2023): 8,573
  - Density: 116.8/km^{2} (302.6/sq mi)
- Time zone: UTC+01:00 (CET)
  - Summer (DST): UTC+02:00 (CEST)
- INSEE/Postal code: 13078 /13230
- ^{1} French Land Register data, which excludes lakes, ponds, glaciers > 1 km^{2} (0.386 sq mi or 247 acres) and river estuaries.

Port-Saint-Louis-du-Rhône (French pronunciation: [pɔʁ sɛ̃ lwi dy ʁon]; Occitan: Pòrt Sant Loís), commonly known as Port-Saint-Louis or Port of Saint Louis is a port and commune in the Bouches-du-Rhône department in southern France. The town serves as a second backup port for the Fos port section of the port of Marseille Fos, major port in France.

== History ==
The commune was created in 1904 from parts of the communes of Arles and Fos-sur-Mer. The Saint-Louis channel was dug in 1871. The parish was established in 1886.

After the first World War dredging was necessary to improve the accessibility of the port of Saint-Louis. The works were estimated at 2,600,000 frf and tendered in the spring of 1924. The Arles Chamber of Commerce would bear half of the cost. Ackermans & van Haaren, Entreprises de Travaux Publics de l’Ouest and A. Bonnardel were in the running for the execution of the works. Their basic price of 2,358,400 frf was the same, but the discount granted varied widely; the competition offered 8% and 30% respectively, while Ackermans & van Haaren gave a discount of 40% which reduced the contract price to 1,415,040 frf, and was therefore awarded the works. They were conducted under the supervision of Victor Saeys. Final delivery took place on 20 November 1926. The works were carried out in a shorter time frame than expected.

== Population ==
Historical population

Year	Pop.	±% p.a.
1906	2,388	—
1911	2,702	+2.50%
1921	3,682	+3.14%
1926	4,174	+2.54%
1931	4,284	+0.52%
1936	4,448	+0.75%
1946	3,982	−1.10%
1954	4,923	+2.69%
1962	6,278	+3.09%

Year	Pop.	±% p.a.
1968	8,285	+4.73%
1975	10,393	+3.29%
1982	10,378	−0.02%
1990	8,624	−2.29%
1999	8,123	−0.66%
2007	8,530	+0.61%
2012	8,579	+0.11%
2017	8,449	−0.30%
2023	8,573	+0.24%

Source: EHESS and INSEE (1968-2023)

== Features ==
Port-Saint-Louis-du-Rhône is an industrial town and port annex of Marseille at the mouth of the Rhône River, and includes many parks, large avenues and large farmhouses known as camarguais.

The town has three popular beaches: Napoleon beach, Olga beach, and Carteau beach.

There are many marshes and cultivated plants nearby, and vast salt-water marshes of the Camargue swamp.

Local wildlife includes herds of wild horses and pink flamingos being in the marshes.

== Industry ==
The Camargue produces primarily salt and mineral oil. There are also petrochemical factories and grain mills.

== See also ==
- Communes of the Bouches-du-Rhône department
