= Arrondissement of Aix-en-Provence =

Coordinates: 43°31′50″N 5°26′40″E

Aix-en-Provence
- Arrondissement
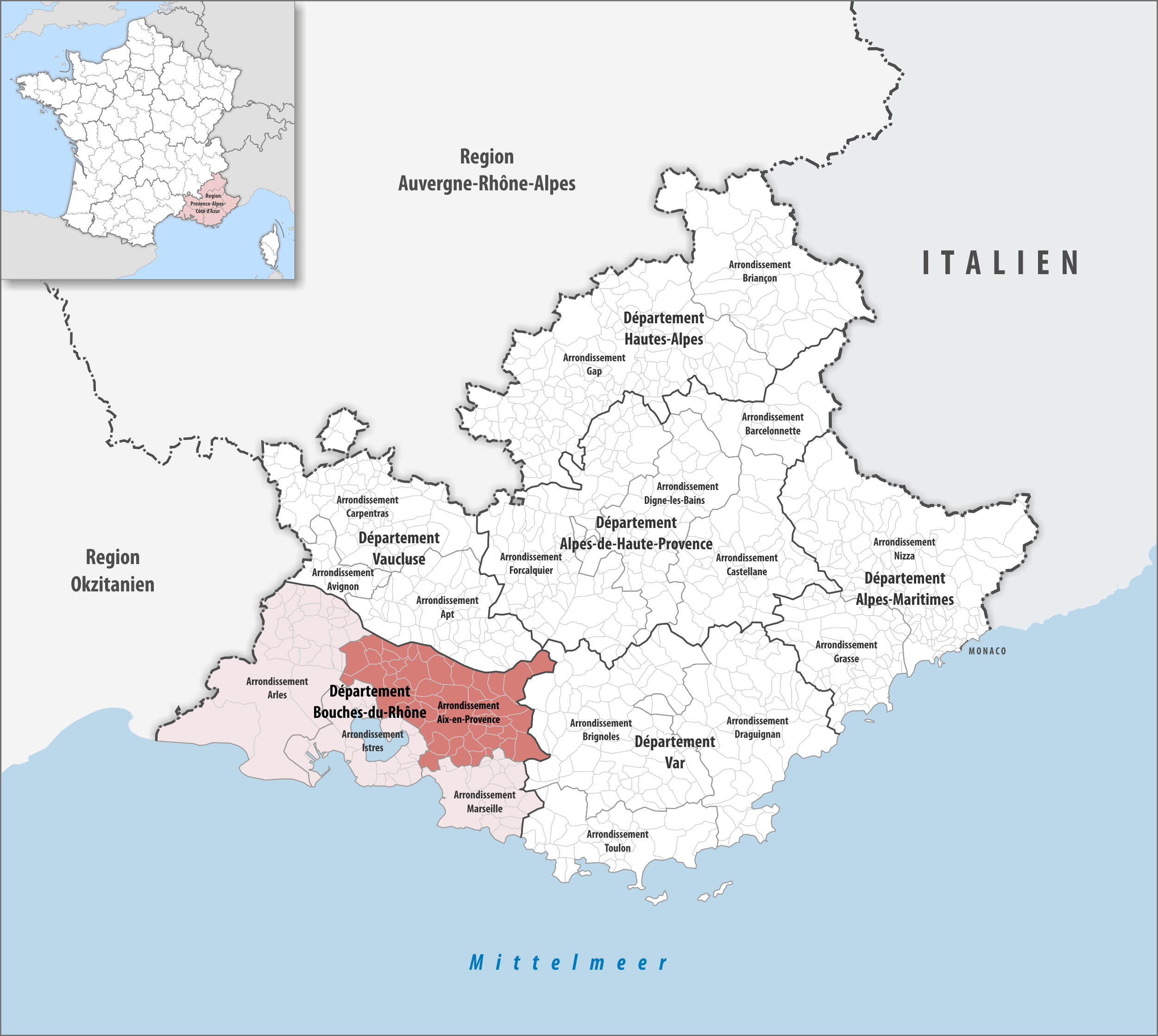
- Location within the department of Bouches-du-Rhône and the region of Provence-Alpes-Côte d'Azur
- Country: France
- Region: Provence-Alpes-Côte d'Azur
- Department: Bouches-du-Rhône
- No. of communes: {{{nbcomm}}}
- Area: 1,657.5 km^{2} (640.0 sq mi)
- Population (2023): 469,172
  - Density: 283.06/km^{2} (733.12/sq mi)
- INSEE code: 131

The arrondissement of Aix-en-Provence is an arrondissement of France in the Bouches-du-Rhône department in the Provence-Alpes-Côte d'Azur region. It has 48 communes. Its population is 460,747 (2021), and its area is 1,657.5 km^{2} (640.0 sq mi).

== Composition ==
The communes of the arrondissement of Aix-en-Provence, and their INSEE codes, are:

1. Aix-en-Provence (13001)
2. Alleins (13003)
3. Aurons (13008)
4. La Barben (13009)
5. Beaurecueil (13012)
6. Bouc-Bel-Air (13015)
7. Cabriès (13019)
8. Charleval (13024)
9. Châteauneuf-le-Rouge (13025)
10. Coudoux (13118)
11. Éguilles (13032)
12. Eyguières (13035)
13. La Fare-les-Oliviers (13037)
14. Fuveau (13040)
15. Gardanne (13041)
16. Gréasque (13046)
17. Jouques (13048)
18. Lamanon (13049)
19. Lambesc (13050)
20. Lançon-Provence (13051)
21. Mallemort (13053)
22. Meyrargues (13059)
23. Meyreuil (13060)
24. Mimet (13062)
25. Pélissanne (13069)
26. Les Pennes-Mirabeau (13071)
27. Peynier (13072)
28. Peyrolles-en-Provence (13074)
29. Puyloubier (13079)
30. Le Puy-Sainte-Réparade (13080)
31. Rognes (13082)
32. La Roque-d'Anthéron (13084)
33. Rousset (13087)
34. Saint-Antonin-sur-Bayon (13090)
35. Saint-Cannat (13091)
36. Saint-Estève-Janson (13093)
37. Saint-Marc-Jaumegarde (13095)
38. Saint-Paul-lès-Durance (13099)
39. Salon-de-Provence (13103)
40. Sénas (13105)
41. Simiane-Collongue (13107)
42. Le Tholonet (13109)
43. Trets (13110)
44. Vauvenargues (13111)
45. Velaux (13112)
46. Venelles (13113)
47. Ventabren (13114)
48. Vernègues (13115)

== History ==
The arrondissement of Aix-en-Provence was created in 1800. At the March 2017 reorganization of the arrondissements of Bouches-du-Rhône, it lost two communes to the arrondissement of Istres and one commune to the arrondissement of Marseille, and it gained six communes from the arrondissement of Arles and one commune from the arrondissement of Marseille.

As a result of the reorganisation of the cantons of France which came into effect in 2015, the borders of the cantons are no longer related to the borders of the arrondissements. The cantons of the arrondissement of Aix-en-Provence were, as of January 2015:

1. Aix-en-Provence-Centre
2. Aix-en-Provence-Nord-Est
3. Aix-en-Provence-Sud-Ouest
4. Gardanne
5. Lambesc
6. Pélissanne
7. Les Pennes-Mirabeau
8. Peyrolles-en-Provence
9. Salon-de-Provence
10. Trets
