= Joseph Farrugia =

Theologian

The Very Reverend Monsignor Dr Joseph Farrugia S.T.D.
- Vicar of Mallemort, Alleins, Charleval and Vernègues
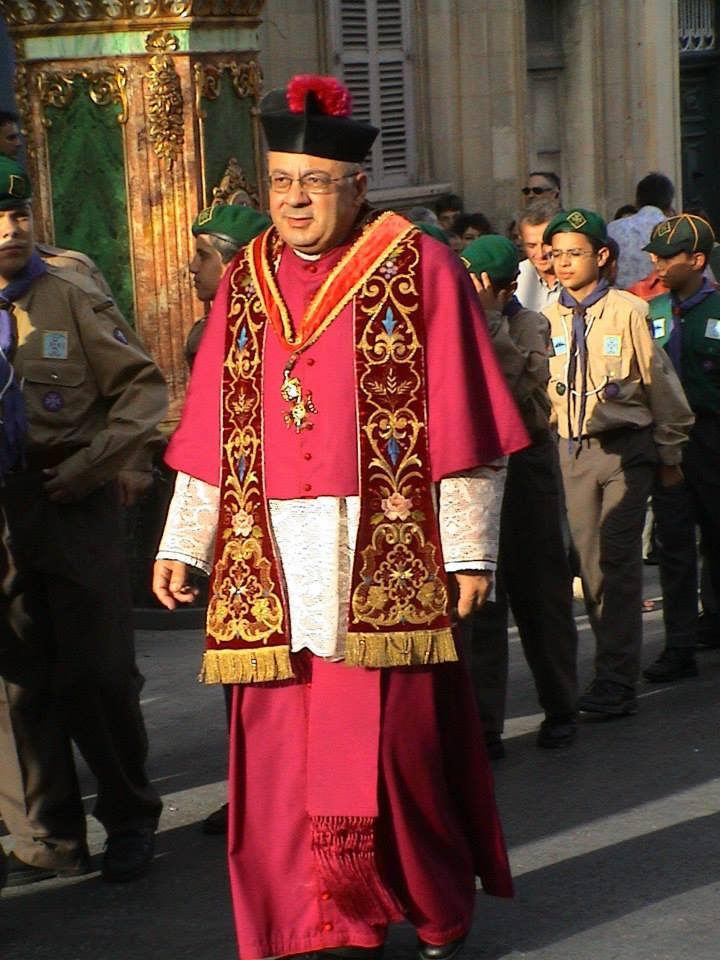
- Church: Roman Catholic
- Diocese: Aix
- Previous posts: Archpriest of St George's Basilica (1998-2007); Delegate for Education and Culture; Senior lecturer at the University of Malta; Chaplain of the Victoria Scots Group; Chaplain of the La Stella Philharmonic Band

Orders
- Ordination: 14 July 1978 by Ermenegildo Florit

Personal details
- Born: February 19, 1954 (age 72) Victoria, Gozo, Malta
- Denomination: Catholicism
- Education: University of Malta; Pontifical Gregorian University; Pontifical Lateran University

Dr Joseph Farrugia is a theologian, senior lecturer and Roman Catholic Monsignor who served as the representative of the Maltese Episcopal Conference to the Commission of the Bishops' Conferences of the European Community. He currently serves as Vicar of the parishes of Mallemort, Alleins, Charleval and Vernègues in the Diocese of Aix, France.

== Academic Achievements ==
Joseph Farrugia was born in Victoria, Gozo on February 19, 1954. After completing his philosophical and theological training at the Gozo Major Seminary, Reverend Farrugia undertook his post-graduate studies in theology obtaining a S.Th.L. in Dogmatic theology and his doctorate in Fundamental theology at the Pontifical Gregorian University in Rome. Moreover Dr Farrugia also studied philosophy at the Pontifical Lateran University and Islamology at the Pontifical Institute of Arab and Islamic Studies. In 1983 he became a lecturer in theology at the Sacred Heart Major Seminary of Gozo and in 1988 he joined the Faculty of Theology at the University of Malta where he still lectures in fundamental theology and ecumenism. Dr Farrugia has also given courses in Mediterranean civilizations and religions. On behalf of the new University of Malta's Gozo Centre, Dr Farrugia coordinated several highly successful series of public lectures focusing on the history and culture of the island. He is the author of The Church and the Muslims and contributor to various international theological publications.

== Archpriest of St George's ==
In 1998 Bishop Nikol Joseph Cauchi appointed Dr Farrugia as Archpriest of St George's Basilica in Victoria, Gozo. During his years as Archpriest he founded the local radio station Leħen il-Belt Victoria in 1999. Moreover he undertook the restoration of St George's Basilica. He was also the person who initiated the building of the Byzantine chapel in St George's Basilica. He remained in this position until 2007 when he was appointed as Delegate for Education and Culture for the Diocese of Gozo. Mgr Farrugia is the co-founder of the renowned Laudate Pueri Choir as well as of the Fondazzjoni Belt Victoria. He co-promoted the annual Victoria International Arts Festival. which is the longest running annual arts festival in the Maltese Islands. He is a long-standing chaplain to the Victoria Scouts Group.

== Representative of the Maltese Bishops to the COMECE ==
In 2008 Dr Farrugia was appointed representative of the Maltese Episcopal Conference to the Commission of the Bishops' Conferences of the European Community and delegate for culture in the Diocese of Gozo. Currently, Dr Farrugia is also the curator of the Heart of Gozo Il-Hagar Museum in Victoria, Gozo.
