= Aurons =

Commune in Provence-Alpes-Côte d'Azur, France

- Commune
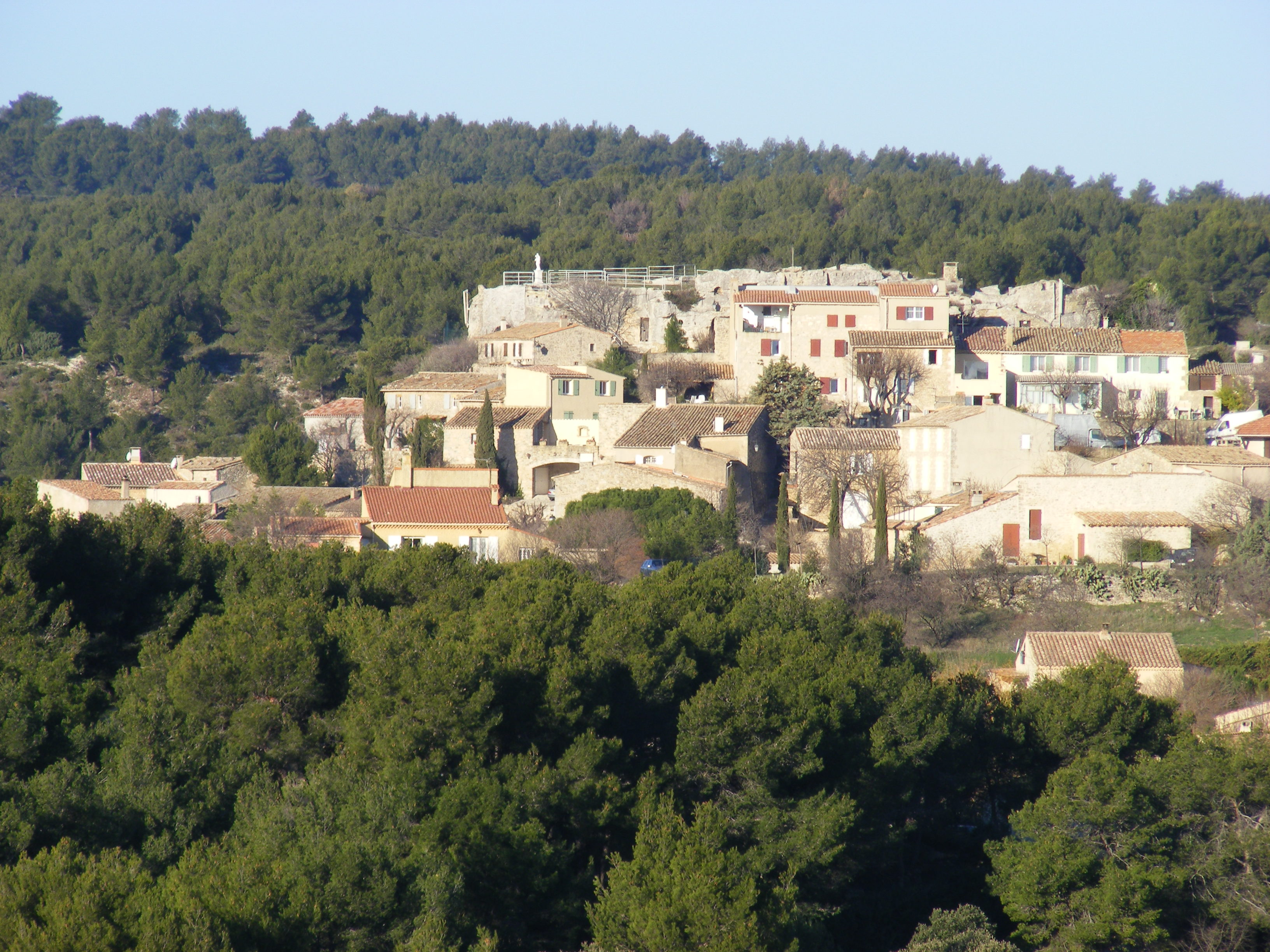
- A view of Aurons

- Coat of arms
- Location of Aurons
- Location within France Location within Provence-Alpes-Côte d'Azur
- Coordinates: 43°39′57″N 5°09′30″E
- Country: France
- Region: Provence-Alpes-Côte d'Azur
- Department: Bouches-du-Rhône
- Arrondissement: Aix-en-Provence
- Canton: Pélissanne
- Intercommunality: Aix-Marseille-Provence

Government
  - Mayor (2026–32): Sophie Kernen
- Area^{1}: 12.82 km^{2} (4.95 sq mi)
- Elevation: 225 m (738 ft)
- Highest elevation: 330 m (1,080 ft)
- Lowest elevation: 140 m (460 ft)
- Population (2023): 555
  - Density: 43.3/km^{2} (112/sq mi)
- Time zone: UTC+01:00 (CET)
  - Summer (DST): UTC+02:00 (CEST)
- INSEE/Postal code: 13008 /13121
- ^{1} French Land Register data, which excludes lakes, ponds, glaciers > 1 km^{2} (0.386 sq mi or 247 acres) and river estuaries.

Aurons (French pronunciation: [oʁɔ̃]; Occitan: Avoirs) is a commune in the Bouches-du-Rhône department in the Provence-Alpes-Côte d'Azur region of southern France.

The commune has been awarded one flower by the National Council of Towns and Villages in Bloom in the Competition of cities and villages in Bloom.

== Geography ==
Aurons is located in the heart of the Massif des Costes mountains some 6 km north-east of Salon-de-Provence. Access to the commune is by the D16 road from Salon-de-Provence which passes through the centre of the commune north of the village and continues north-east to Alleins. Access to the village is by the D68 road from Pélissanne in the south which passes through the village and joins the D16 just to the north of the village. Route No. 8 of the Libébus network serves the commune. Large forests cover much of the commune but with some farming activity in the north and south.

Tributaries of the Vabre rise in the north of the commune and flow west to join the Vabre. Other streams rise in the east of the commune and flows south.

=== Seismicity ===
Following the decree of 14 May 1991 defining the seismic zoning of France, Bouches-du-Rhône was divided as follows:

- Zone II with "average seismicity" for the cantons of: Lambesc, Peyrolles-en-Provence, and Salon-de-Provence; all three being in the Arrondissement of Aix-en-Provence
- Zone Ib with "low seismicity" for the cantons of Aix-en-Provence and Trets in the arrondissement of Aix-en-Provence, the cantons of Eyguières and Orgon in the Arrondissement of Arles, and the cantons of Berre-l'Étang, Istres-Nord, and Istres-Sud in the Arrondissement of Istres;
- Zone Ia with "very low seismicity" for all other cantons in the arrondissement of Aix-en-Provence, the cantons of: Arles-Est, Châteaurenard, and Saint-Rémy-de-Provence in the arrondissement of Arles, the cantons of Marignane, Martigues-Est, and Martigues-Ouest in the arrondissement of Istres, and finally the canton of Roquevaire in the Arrondissement of Marseille
- Zone 0 with "negligible seismicity" for all others.

=== Climate ===
Climate data below is for the weather station at Salon-de-Provence, 6 km to the south-west, for the period 1981–2010.

Comparison of local Meteorological data with other cities in France
Town	Sunshine (hours/yr)	Rain (mm/yr)	Snow (days/yr)	Storm (days/yr)	Fog (days/yr)
National average	1,973	770	14	22	40
Aurons	-	580	2	20	8
Paris	1,661	637	12	18	10
Nice	2,724	767	1	29	1
Strasbourg	1,693	665	29	29	56
Brest	1,605	1,211	7	12	75

== History ==
=== Middle Ages ===
From the 12th to the 15th century the priory of Saint-Pierre de Canon belonged to the Abbey of Saint-André Villeneuve-lès-Avignon.

Arimondus of Auronis, squire, was Lord of Aurons. He was descended from an old family of knights that participated in the Pélissanne campaign in the 12th and 13th centuries. He must be differentiated from Squire Raymond d'Aurons, co-lord of Rognonas, who was a member of the family of Rostaing de Auronis, a squire attested in 1345, and the noble Pierre de Auronis, co-lord of Aurons, who ceded his manorial rights to Arimondus in court in 1322. He was the son of Hugues de Auronis, the co-lord of Aurons, and had property in Pélissanne where he owned Montmajour Abbey. Aimondus had a son, Pierre de Auronis, alias "Luperiis".".

The death of Queen Joanna I of Naples created a crisis of succession for the County of Provence with the cities of the Union of Aix (1382-1387) supporting Charles de Duras against Louis I of Anjou. The Lord of Aurons, Raymond, rallied to the Angevins in 1385 after the death of Louis I.

=== French Revolution ===
A Revolutionary Surveillance Committee was established in Aurons in 1793. It could not recruit the twelve members required by the decree of the National Convention and has several simple peasants and illiterates as members. This institution was a mark of the height of democracy of the Revolution. Illiterate members took part in the debates and in turn occupied the post of president. The committee, who were in charge of monitoring the implementation of laws and making lists of suspects, said there were no suspects in the town which was only populated by farmers.

=== Heraldry ===
Arms of Aurons	Blazon: Party per fesse, 1 of Gules with an Ox of Or horned the same; 2 of Argent with a bend sinister of Vert.

== Administration ==
List of Successive Mayors

From	To	Name	Party
1960	2008	Maurice Merendol	PS
2008	2014	Robert Coste	
2014	2026	André Bertero	PS
2026	incumbent	Sophie Kernen	

== Population ==
The inhabitants of the commune are known as Auronais or Auronaises in French.

Historical population
Year	Pop.	±% p.a.
1968	150	—
1975	247	+7.39%
1982	282	+1.91%
1990	355	+2.92%
1999	515	+4.22%
2007	529	+0.34%
2012	531	+0.08%
2017	551	+0.74%
2023	555	+0.12%
Source: INSEE

== Culture and heritage ==
=== Civil heritage ===
The commune has many buildings and structures that are registered as historical monuments:

- A Farmhouse (1) (16th century)
- A Farmhouse (2) (17th century)
- A Lavoir (Public laundry) (1887)
- A House on Grande Rue
- An Olive Oil Mill (18th century)
- Aurons Village
- A Farmhouse at La Reinaude (16th century)
- A Farmhouse at Petit Sonailler (1651)
- A Farmhouse at La Giraude (19th century)
- A Farmhouse at Grand Sonailler (18th century)
- A Sheep Shed at Vallon de Jeanette (18th century)
- A Sheep Shed at La Grand Font (18th century)
- A Fortified Chateau at Le Castellas (9th century)
- Le Chateau (destroyed) (19th century)
- A Megalith (Prehistoric)
- A Lavoir (Public laundry) at Vallon de Léoure (destroyed)

=== Religious heritage ===
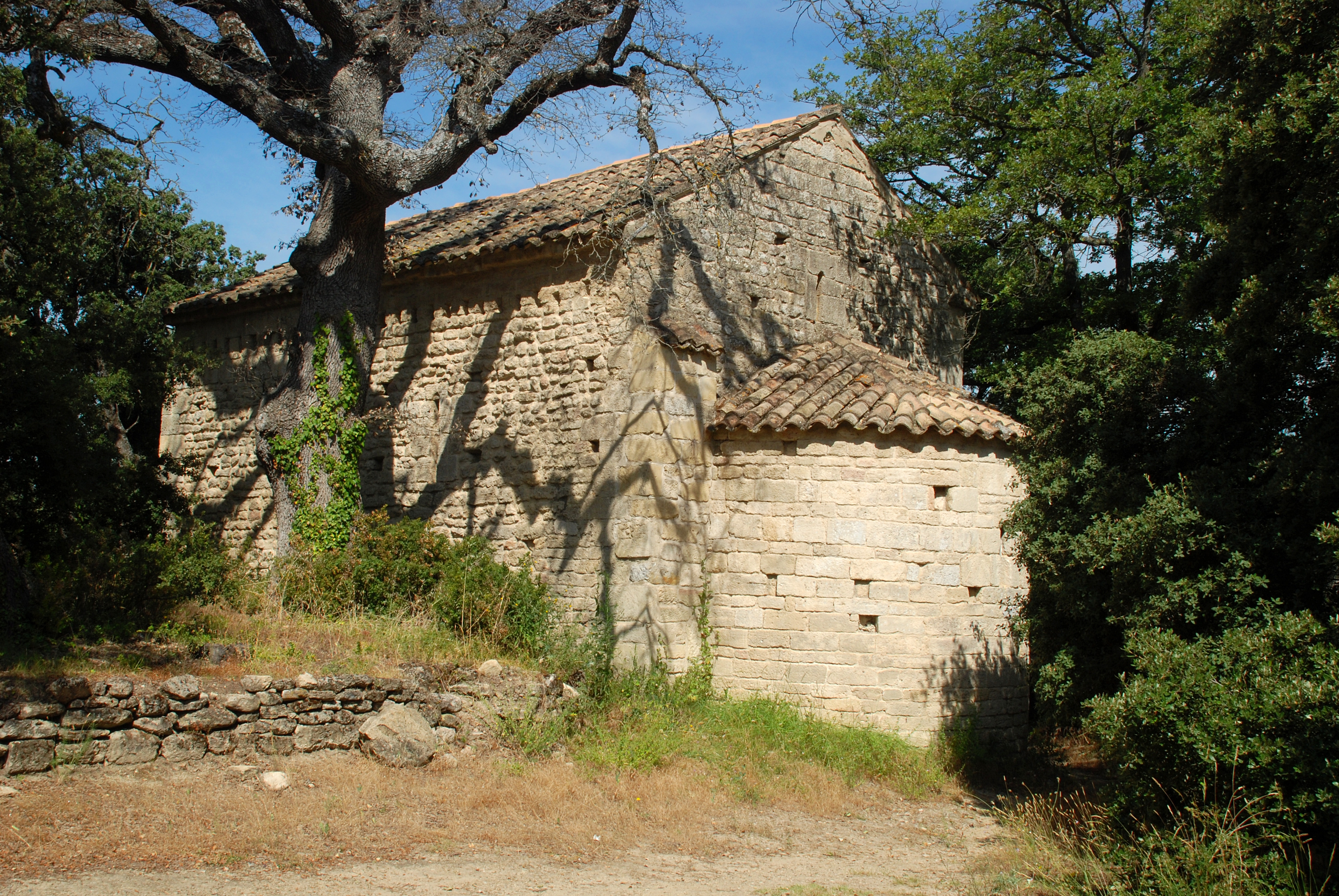
The Chapel of Saint-Martin

The commune has several religious buildings and structures that are registered as historical monuments:

- A Presbytery (17th century)
- The Monastery Saint-Pierre (13th century)
- The Chapel Saint-Martin (13th century)
- The Parish Church (17th century)
- A Monumental Cross at La Grand Fond (19th century)
- A Monumental Cross at l'Arénier (19th century)

== See also ==
- Communes of the Bouches-du-Rhône department
