= Charleval =

Charleval is the name of 2 communes in France:

- Charleval, Bouches-du-Rhône, in the Bouches-du-Rhône department
- Charleval, Eure, in the Eure department
