= La Barben =

Commune in Provence-Alpes-Côte d'Azur, France

- Commune
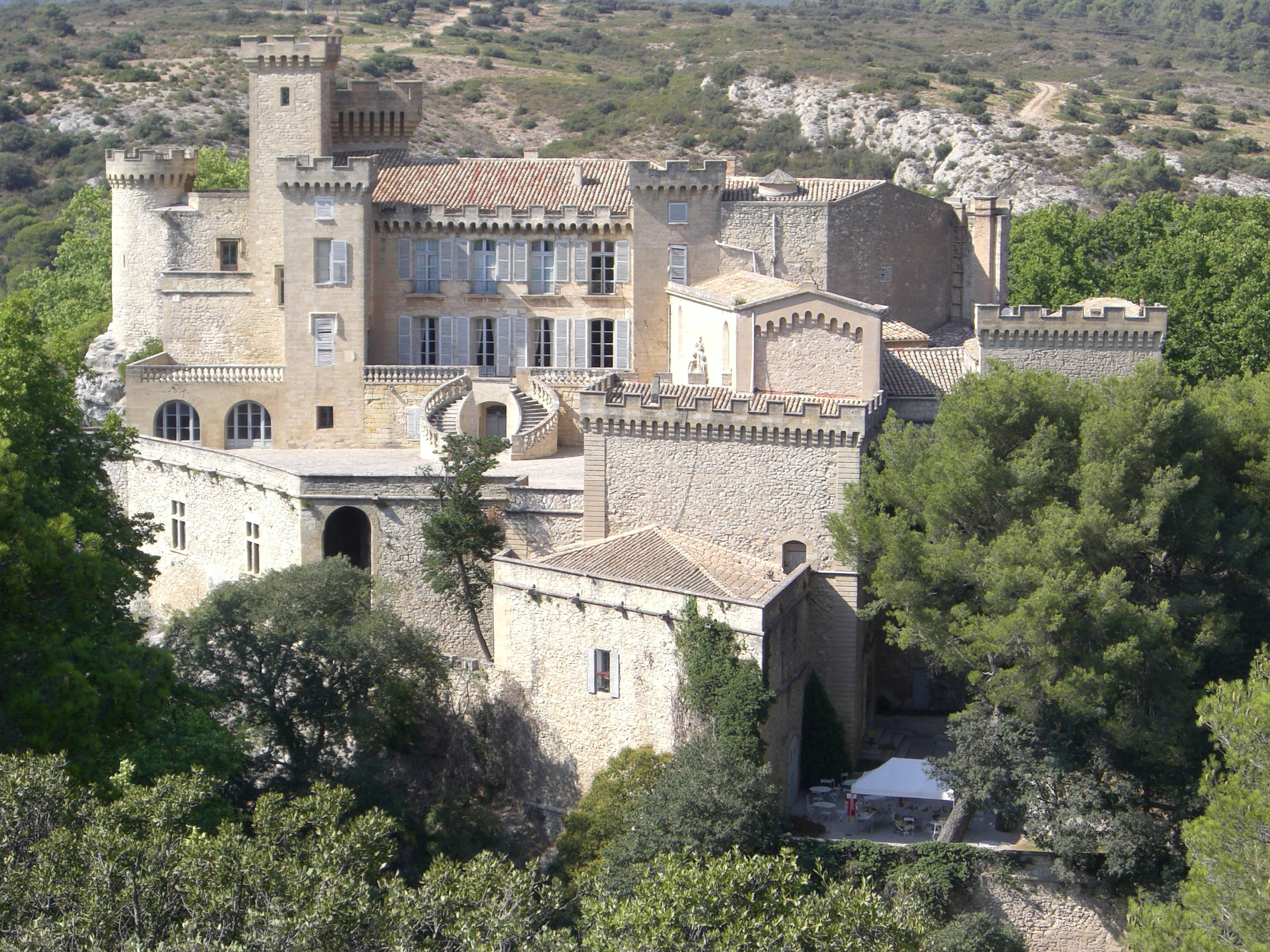
- The Château of La Barben

- Coat of arms
- Location of La Barben
- Location within France Location within Provence-Alpes-Côte d'Azur
- Coordinates: 43°37′51″N 5°10′38″E
- Country: France
- Region: Provence-Alpes-Côte d'Azur
- Department: Bouches-du-Rhône
- Arrondissement: Aix-en-Provence
- Canton: Pélissanne
- Intercommunality: Aix-Marseille-Provence

Government
  - Mayor (2026–32): Franck Santos
- Area^{1}: 22.85 km^{2} (8.82 sq mi)
- Elevation: 114 m (374 ft)
- Highest elevation: 204 m (669 ft)
- Lowest elevation: 87 m (285 ft)
- Population (2023): 868
  - Density: 38.0/km^{2} (98.4/sq mi)
- Time zone: UTC+01:00 (CET)
  - Summer (DST): UTC+02:00 (CEST)
- INSEE/Postal code: 13009 /13330
- ^{1} French Land Register data, which excludes lakes, ponds, glaciers > 1 km^{2} (0.386 sq mi or 247 acres) and river estuaries.

La Barben (French pronunciation: [la baʁbɛ̃]; Occitan: La Barbent) is a commune in the Bouches-du-Rhône department in the Provence-Alpes-Côte d'Azur region of southern France.

The town is perhaps best known for its castle and its zoo.

== Geography ==
La Barben is located about 18 km northwest of Aix-en-Provence and 5 km east of Salon-de-Provence. Access to the commune is by the D572 road from Salon-de-Provence, which passes through the centre of the commune and continues east to Saint-Cannat. The D17 from Pélissanne to Éguilles forms the southwestern border of the commune. The D67E from Lambesc to Coudoux forms the southeastern border of the commune. The D22A comes from Pelissane and passes through the village, continuing as the D22 to join the D572 in the centre of the commune next to the zoo.

The commune is served by routes 9 and 14 of the Libébus network.

The Touloubre river flows through the centre of the commune from the east and continues west to join the Mediterranean Sea south of Saint-Chamas. The Vallat de Boulery forms the northern border of the commune as it flows west to join the Touloubre at the village. The Canal de Marseille comes from the south and passes through the centre of the commune continuing north-east.

=== Climate ===
Comparison of local Meteorological data with other cities in France
Town	Sunshine (hours/yr)	Rain (mm/yr)	Snow (days/yr)	Storm (days/yr)	Fog (days/yr)
National average	1,973	770	14	22	40
La Barben	-	580	2	20	8
Paris	1,661	637	12	18	10
Nice	2,724	767	1	29	1
Strasbourg	1,693	665	29	29	56
Brest	1,605	1,211	7	12	75

Weather Data for La Barben

Climate data for Salon-de-Provence
Month	Jan	Feb	Mar	Apr	May	Jun	Jul	Aug	Sep	Oct	Nov	Dec	Year
Mean daily maximum °C (°F)	11.0 (51.8)	12.4 (54.3)	15.7 (60.3)	18.4 (65.1)	22.8 (73.0)	26.9 (80.4)	30.2 (86.4)	29.7 (85.5)	25.3 (77.5)	20.6 (69.1)	14.6 (58.3)	11.4 (52.5)	19.9 (67.8)
Daily mean °C (°F)	6.1 (43.0)	7.0 (44.6)	9.9 (49.8)	12.6 (54.7)	16.7 (62.1)	20.6 (69.1)	23.6 (74.5)	23.3 (73.9)	19.4 (66.9)	15.4 (59.7)	10.0 (50.0)	6.8 (44.2)	14.3 (57.7)
Mean daily minimum °C (°F)	1.1 (34.0)	1.6 (34.9)	4.1 (39.4)	6.8 (44.2)	10.6 (51.1)	14.3 (57.7)	17.0 (62.6)	16.8 (62.2)	13.5 (56.3)	10.2 (50.4)	5.3 (41.5)	2.2 (36.0)	8.6 (47.5)
Average precipitation mm (inches)	50.9 (2.00)	34.7 (1.37)	35.7 (1.41)	58.3 (2.30)	48.9 (1.93)	26.3 (1.04)	10.6 (0.42)	33.7 (1.33)	78.2 (3.08)	84.9 (3.34)	67.0 (2.64)	50.7 (2.00)	579.9 (22.83)
Average precipitation days (≥ 1 mm)	5.1	4.8	4.5	6.3	5.2	3.2	1.5	2.9	4.8	6.5	6.2	5.5	56.5
Source: Meteorological data for Salon-de-Provence - 59m altitude, from 1981 to 2010 January 2015

=== Neighbouring communes and villages ===
Source:

== History ==
=== Middle Ages ===
The death of Queen Joanna I of Naples created a succession crisis for the County of Provence with the cities of the Union of Aix (1382-1387) supporting Charles III of Naples against Louis I, Duke of Anjou. The King of France, Charles VI, intervened and sent the Seneschal of Beaucaire, Enguerrand d'Eudin, who conquered La Barben in the summer of 1383. When Louis I died and his widow, Marie of Blois, Duchess of Anjou, arrived in Provence to defend the rights of her son, Louis II of Naples, she claimed that the seneschal gave her the city which she refused on the instruction of the King of France.

=== Heraldry ===
Arms of La Barben	The official status of the arms remains to be determined Blazon: Party per pale, first Gules, an arched bridge Vert masoned in Sable; second Or, a chevron Azure between three leopard's heads of Sable erased affrontant tongued in Gules. N.B. These arms do not respect the Rule of tincture and are therefore faulty.

== Administration ==
List of Successive Mayors

From	To	Name
1995	2006	Alain Ruault
2006	2008	Jean-Luc Vasserot-Merle
2008	2020	Christophe Amalric
2020	2026	Franck Santos

== Demography ==
The inhabitants of the commune are known as Barbenais or Barbenaises in French.

Historical population

Year	Pop.	±% p.a.
1793	316	—
1800	496	+6.65%
1806	383	−4.22%
1821	385	+0.03%
1831	330	−1.53%
1836	304	−1.63%
1841	325	+1.34%
1846	359	+2.01%
1851	348	−0.62%
1856	324	−1.42%
1861	316	−0.50%
1866	329	+0.81%
1872	294	−1.86%
1876	310	+1.33%
1881	306	−0.26%
1886	311	+0.32%
1891	275	−2.43%
1896	269	−0.44%
1901	283	+1.02%

Year	Pop.	±% p.a.
1906	282	−0.07%
1911	231	−3.91%
1921	212	−0.85%
1926	192	−1.96%
1931	192	+0.00%
1936	196	+0.41%
1946	207	+0.55%
1954	224	+0.99%
1962	259	+1.83%
1968	315	+3.32%
1975	350	+1.52%
1982	420	+2.64%
1990	500	+2.20%
1999	555	+1.17%
2007	704	+3.02%
2012	724	+0.56%
2017	845	+3.14%
2023	868	+0.45%

Source: EHESS and INSEE

== Culture and heritage ==
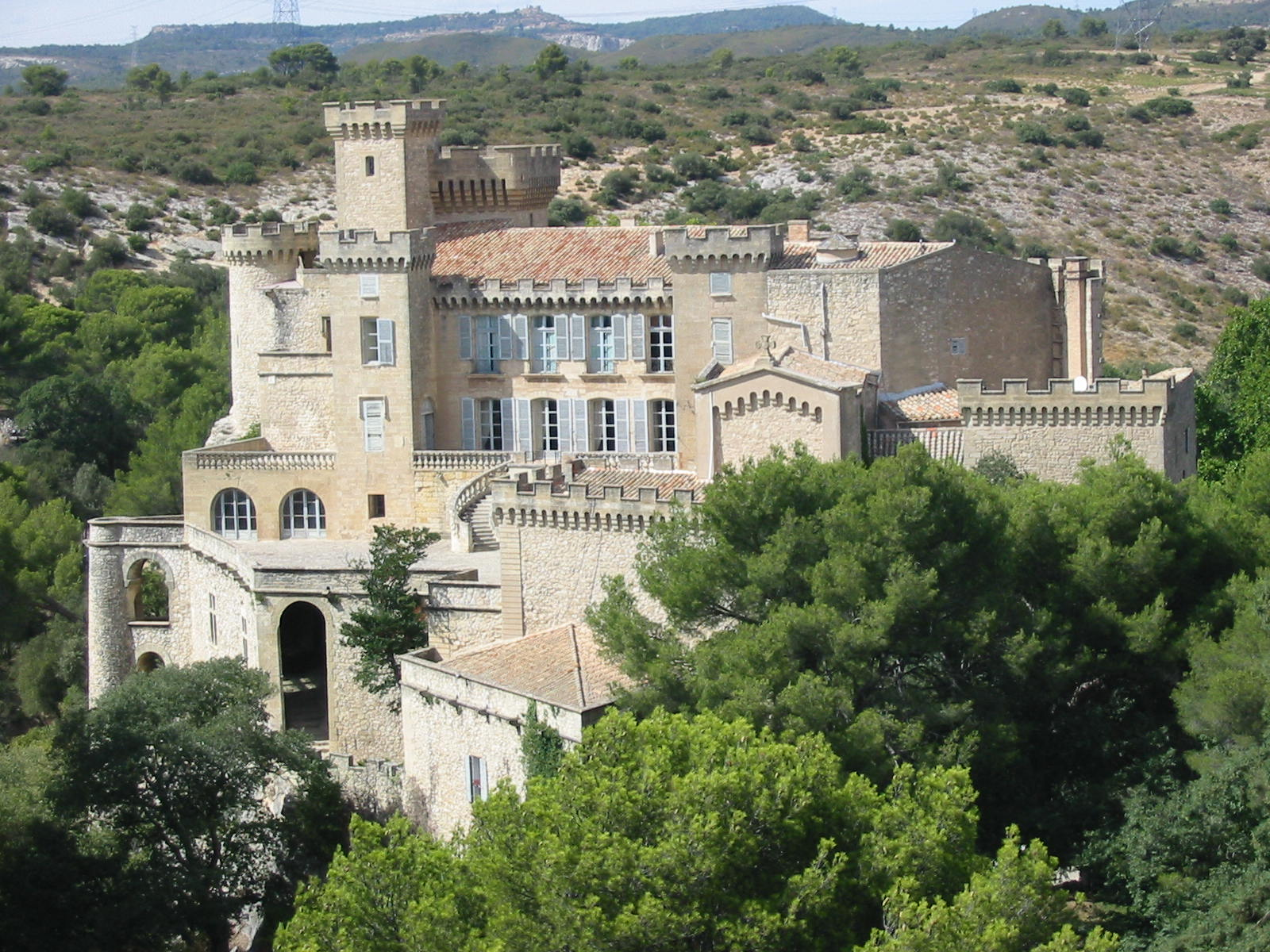
The Chateau de la Barben

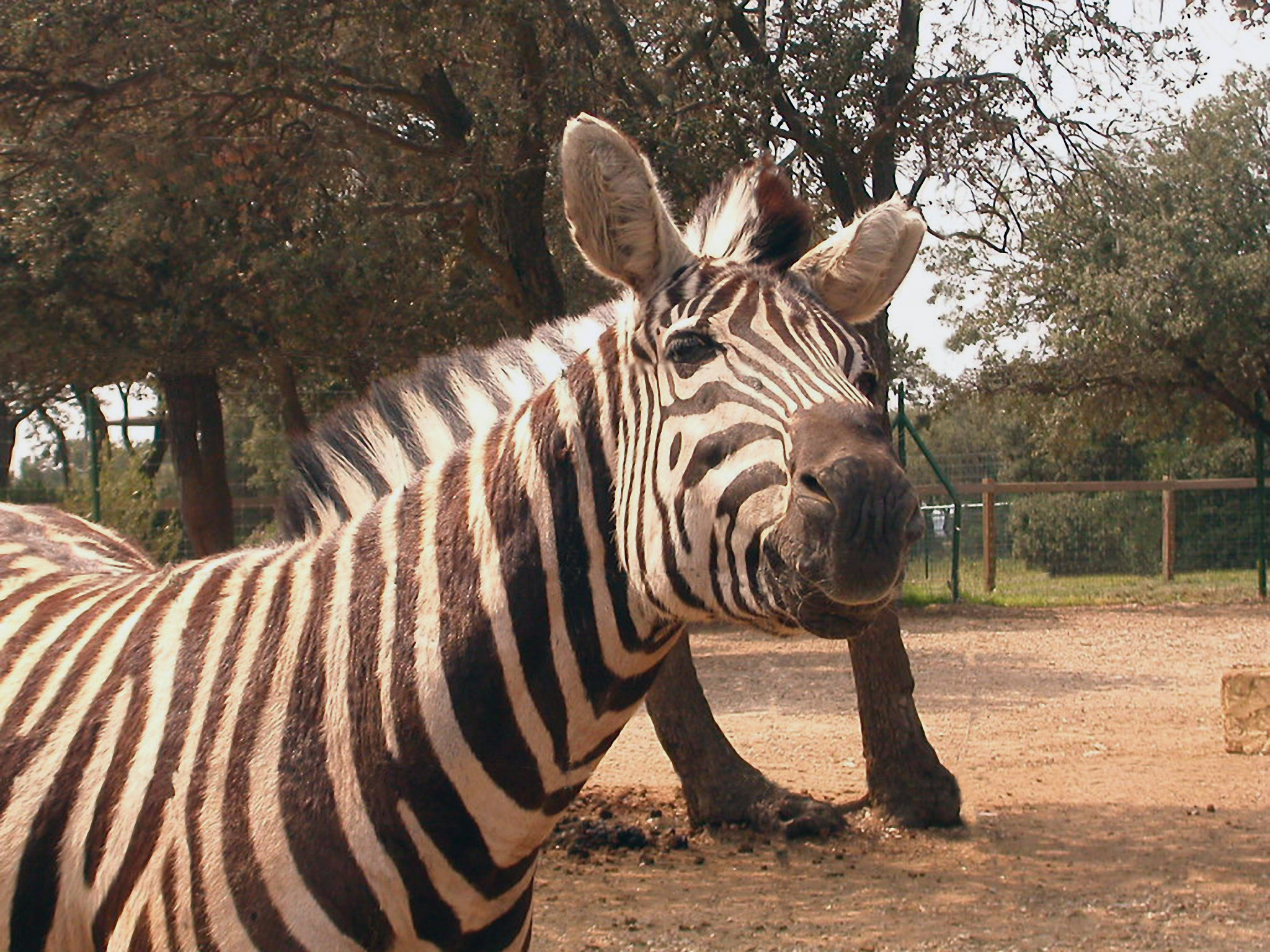
At the zoo

=== Civil heritage ===
The commune has many buildings and sites that are registered as historical monuments:

- A Laundry at La Blancherie (18th century)
- A Chateau Garden on the D22 (17th century)
- A Bridge over the Canal de Marseille on RN572 (19th century)
- A Montjoie (Note: A Stone or pile of stones used to mark a migratory trail, a pilgrimage route, the limit of a territory, or to commemorate a battle) at La Baou
- The fortified Chateau de la Barben (11th century)
- A Farmhouse at La Baou (18th century)
- The Clos Farmhouse at Sufferchoix (15th century)
- A Farmhouse at Val d'Estable (18th century)

Other sites of interest

- The La Barben Zoo

Zoo Picture Gallery

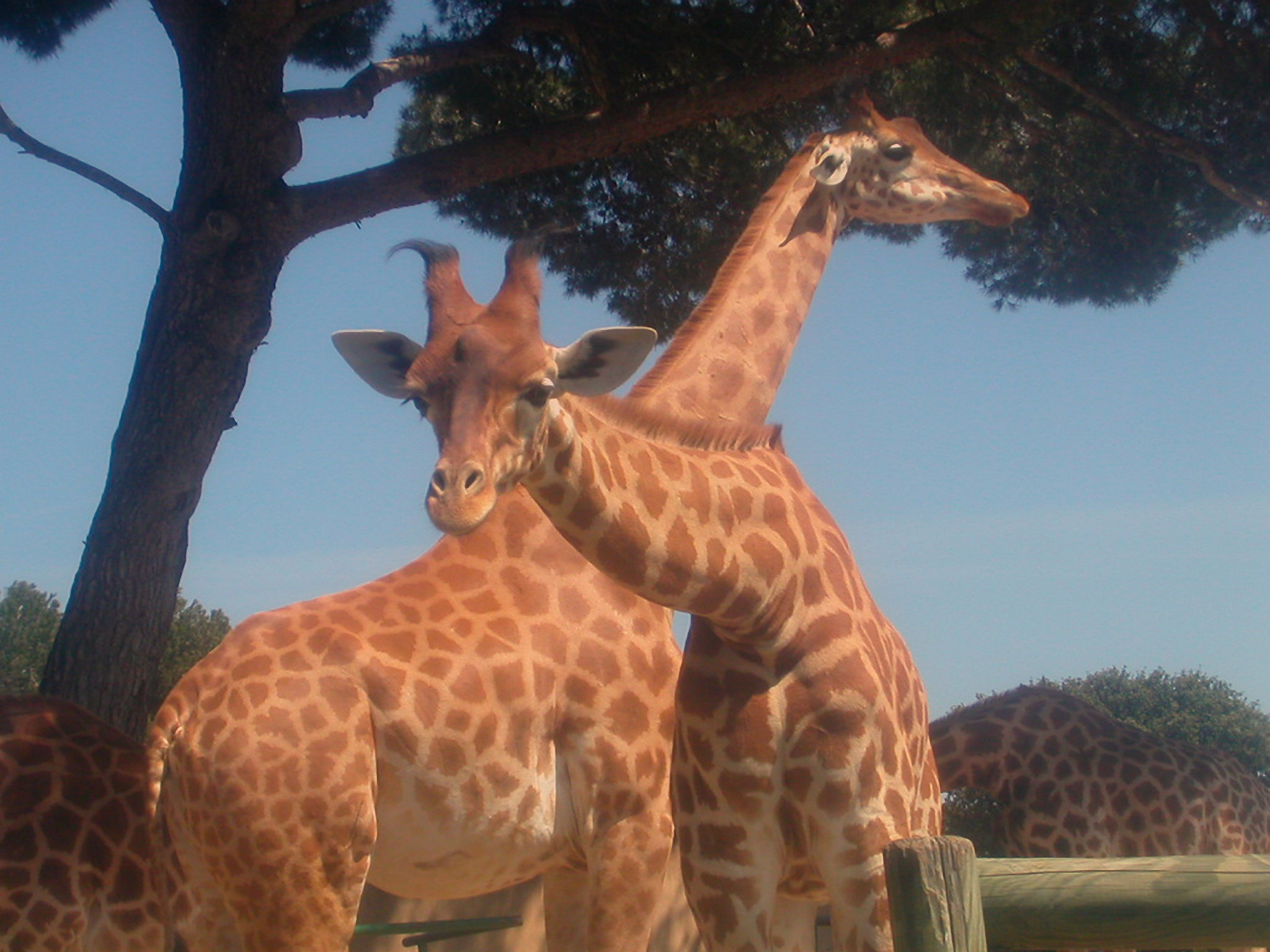
Giraffes

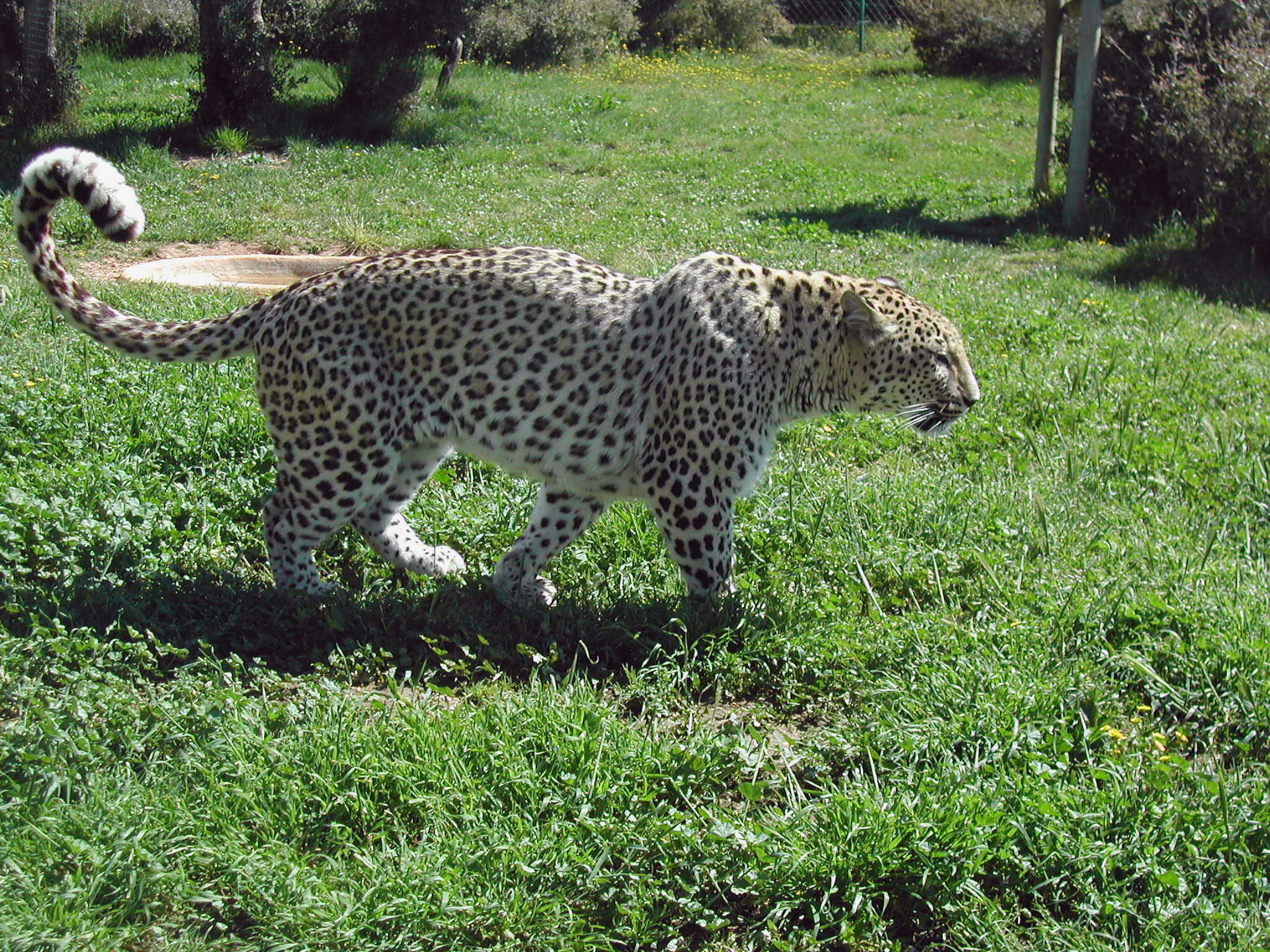
Panther

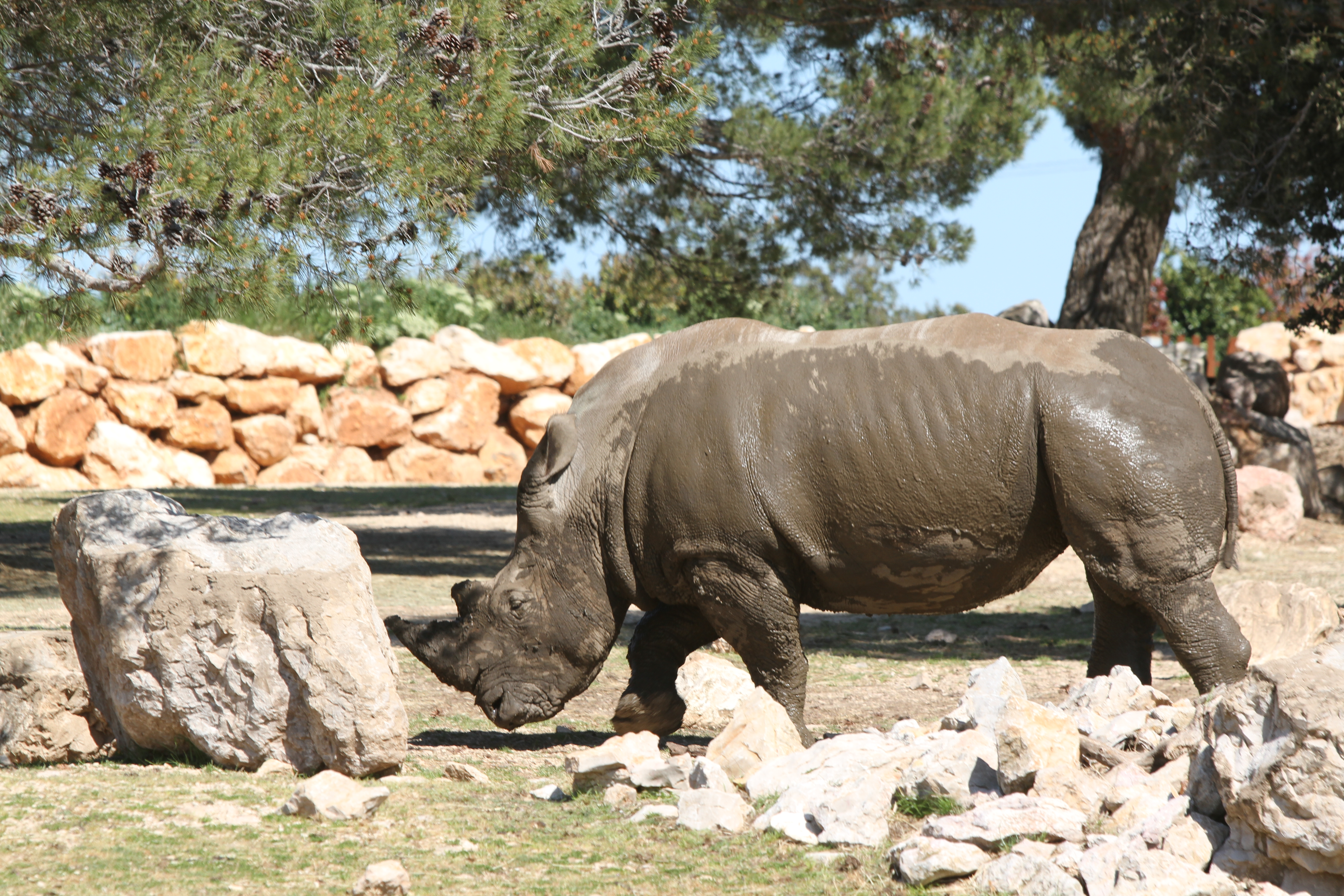
Rhinoceros

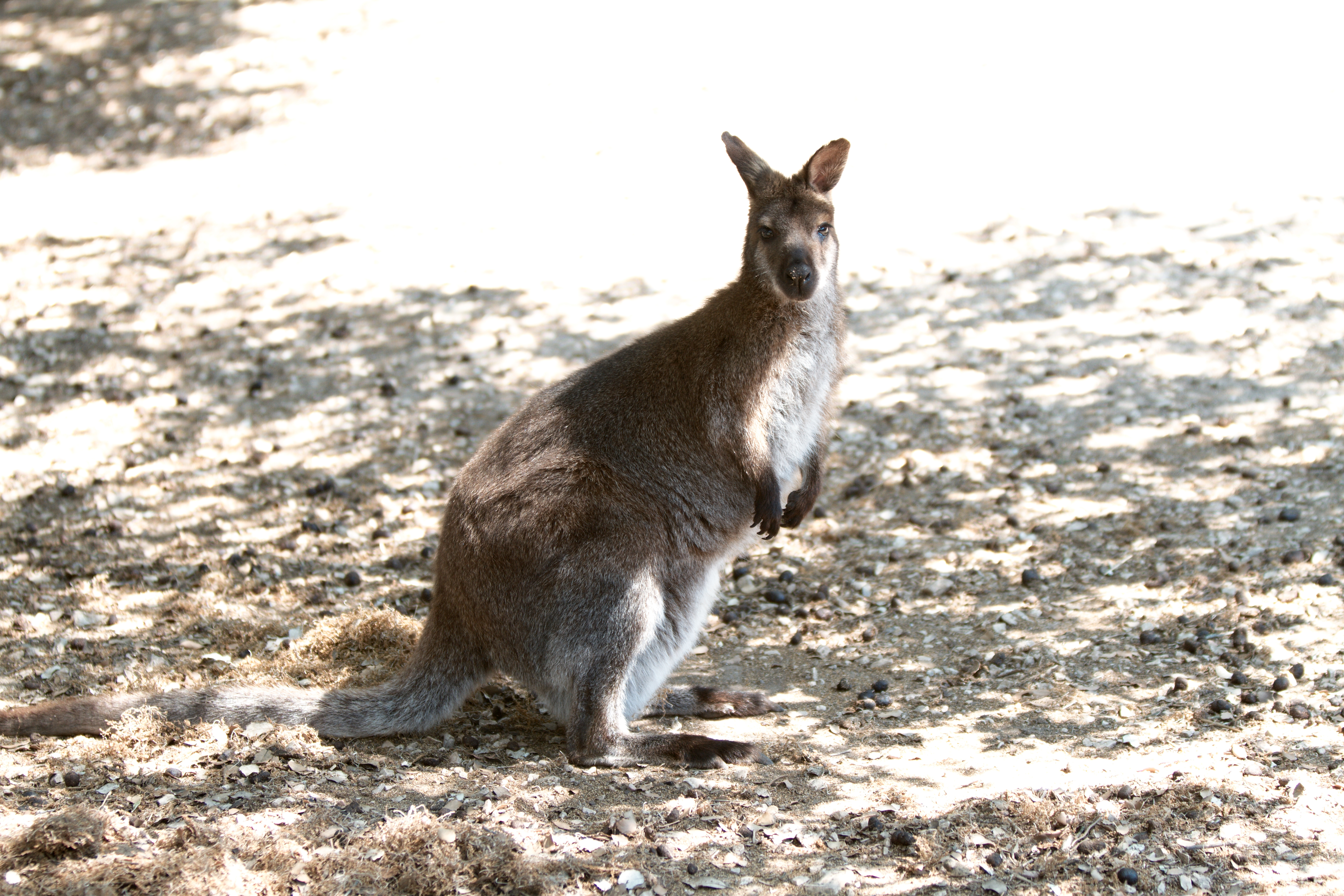
Wallaby

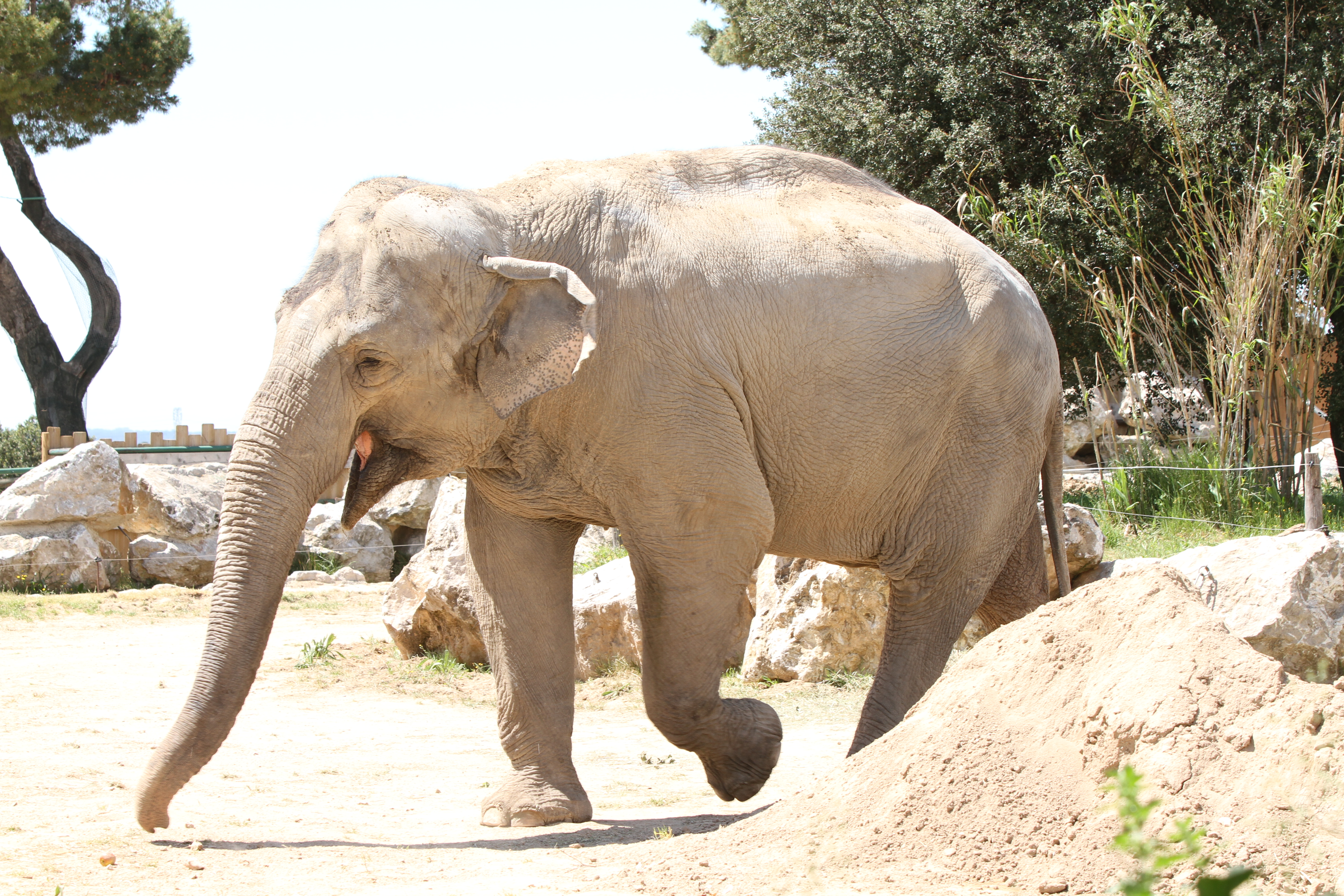
Elephant

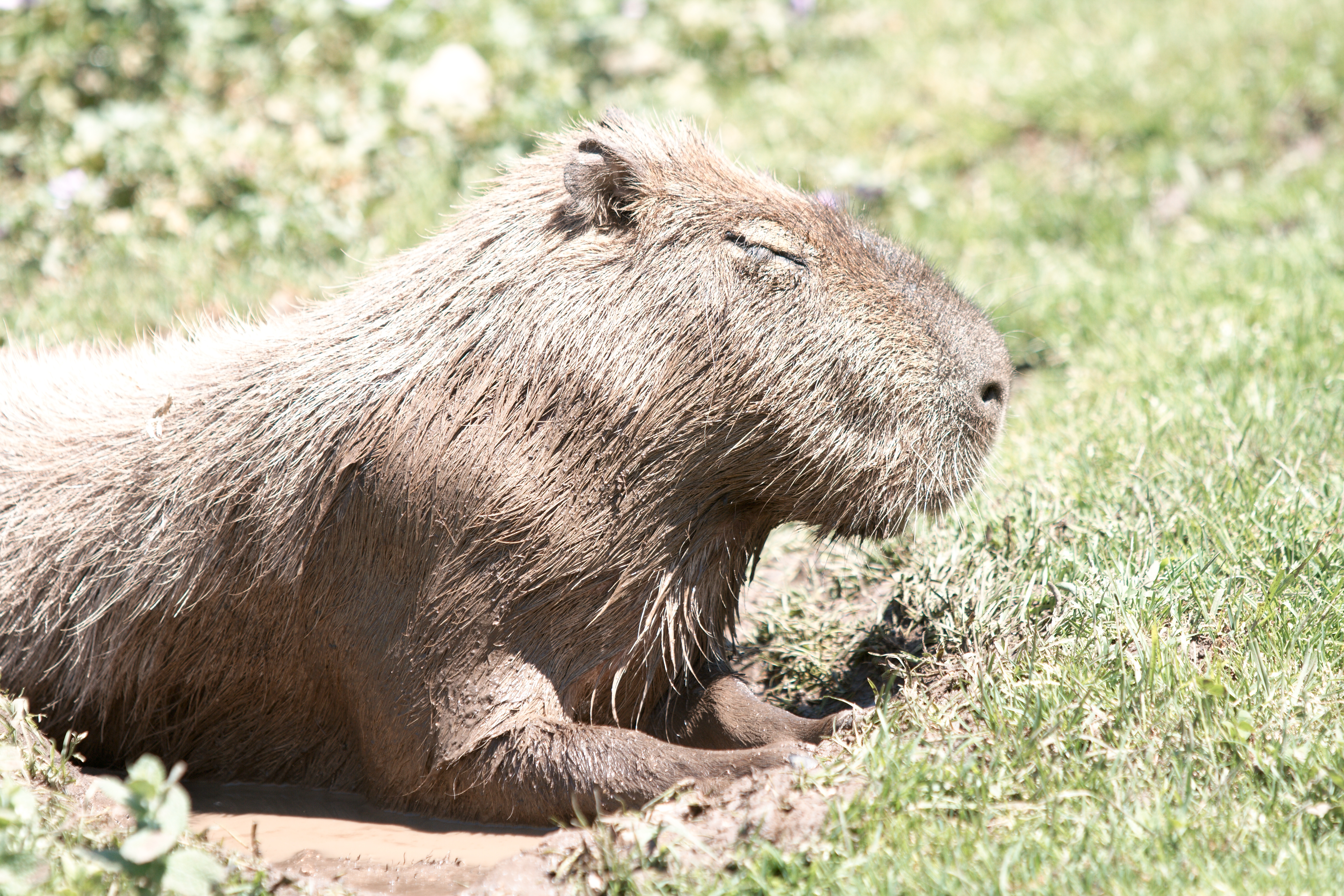
Capybara

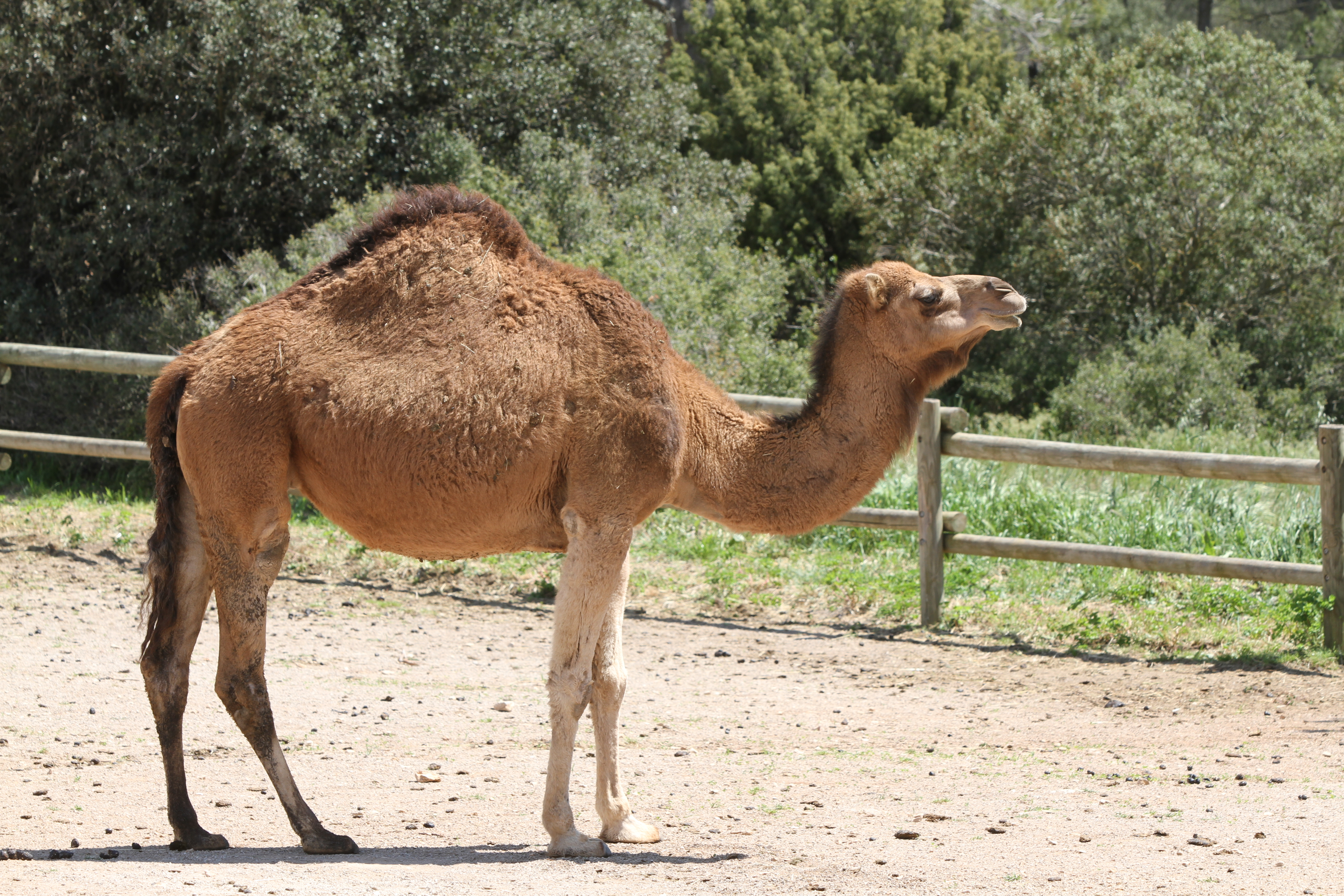
Camel

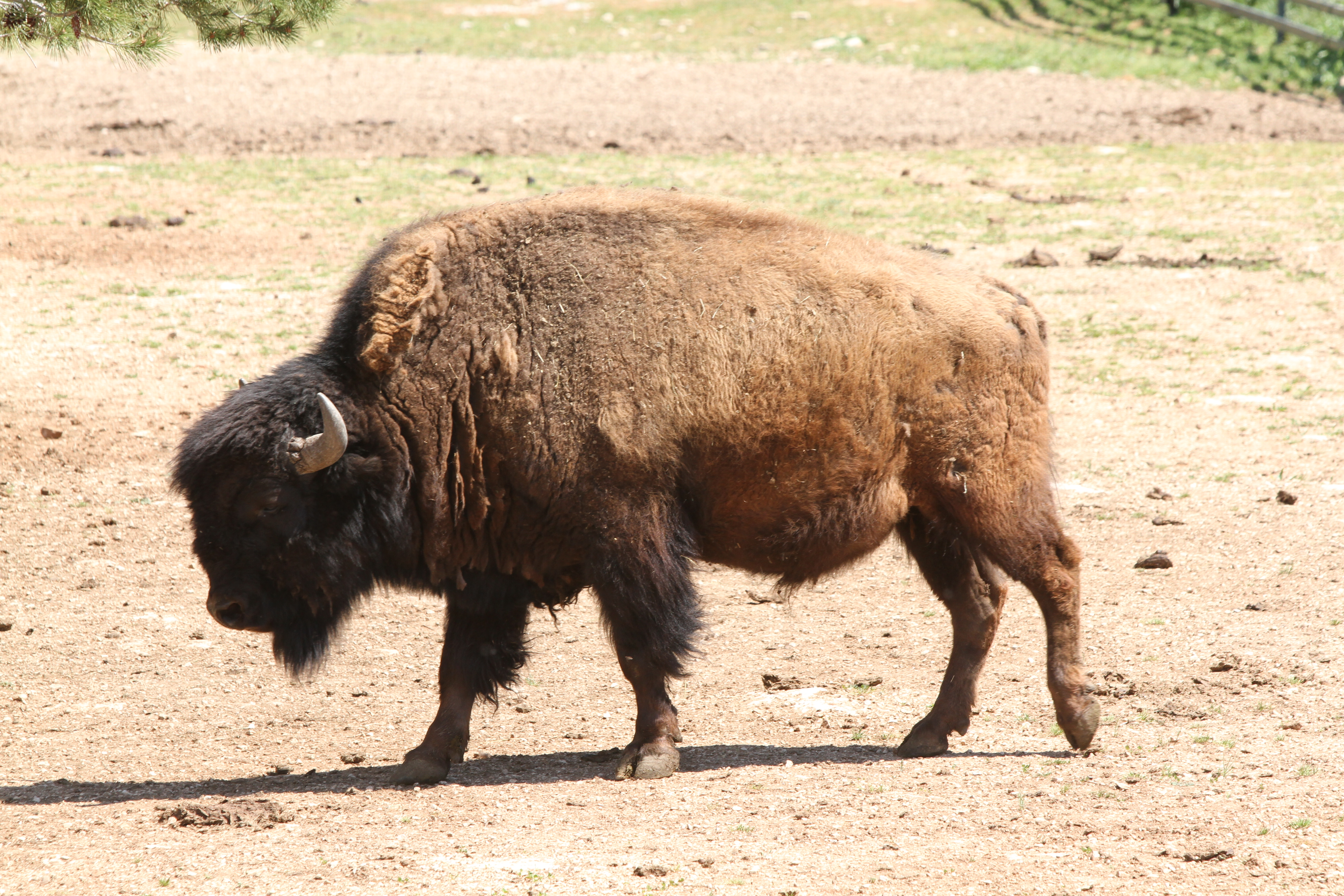
Bison

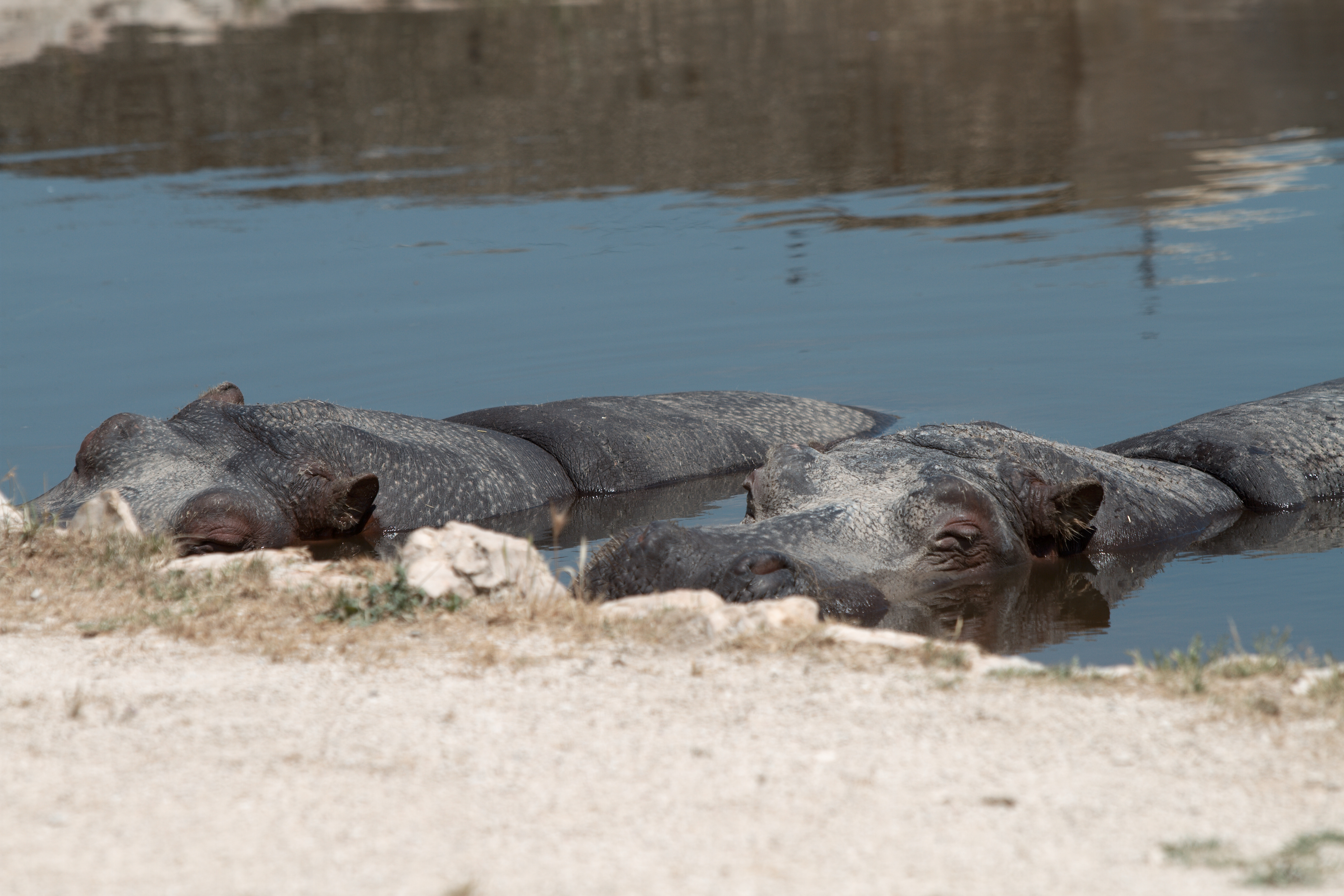
Hippopotamus

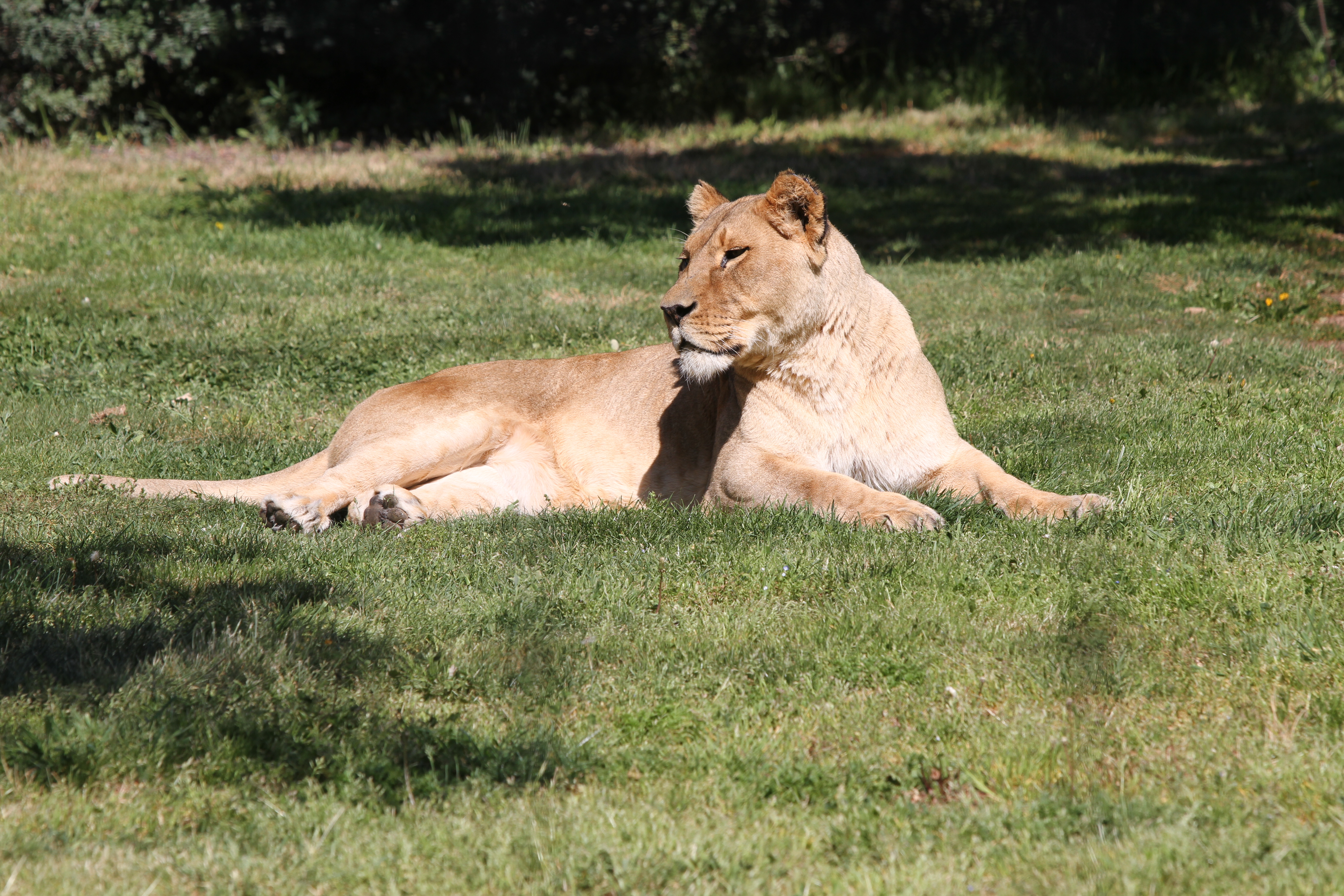
Lion

=== Religious heritage ===
The commune has several religious buildings and structures that are registered as historical monuments:

- The Parish Church of Saint-Sauveur The Church contains several items that are registered as historical objects:
  - 2 Chairs (19th century)
  - A Statue: Virgin and child (18th century)
  - A framed Painting: the Transfiguration (1632)
  - A Painting: Saint Jerome (17th century)
- The Benedictine Church of Saint-Sauveur (11th century)
- The Benedictine Convent of Saint-Victor-de-Danes at Le Mounestier (12th century)
- A Monumental Cross at Val d'Estable (17th century)
- A Monumental Cross at La Beaumé de Matelas (19th century)

== Notable people linked to the commune ==
- Count Auguste de Forbin (1777-1841), painter, pupil of Jacques-Louis David, Director of the Louvre Museum.

== See also ==
- Communes of the Bouches-du-Rhône department
