= Simon Porte Jacquemus =

French fashion designer (born 1990)

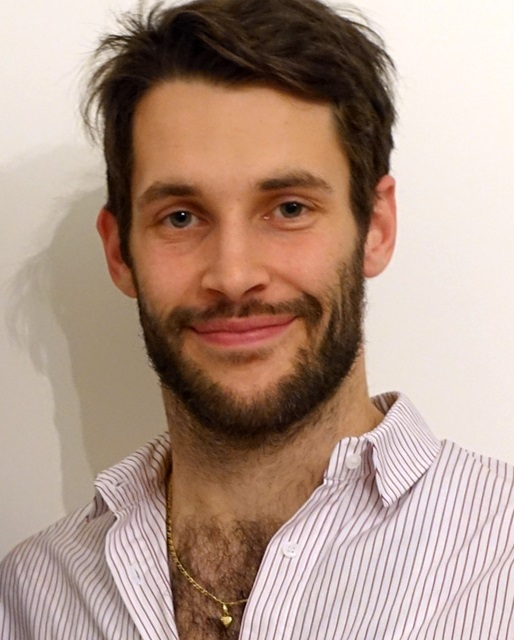
- Jacquemus in 2015
- Born: 16 January 1990 (age 36); Salon-de-Provence, France
- Education: ESMOD
- Occupation: Fashion designer
- Years active: 2009–present
- Spouse: Marco Maestri (m. 2022)
- Children: 2

Simon Porte Jacquemus (French pronunciation: [simɔ̃ pɔʁt ʒakmys]; born 16 January 1990) is a French fashion designer and the founder of the Jacquemus fashion label.

== Early life ==
Jacquemus was born in Salon-de-Provence, France, into a family of farmers; his father occasionally sang in metal bands and his mother raised him. He grew up in the small town of Mallemort in southern France.

In 2008, at the age of 18, he went to Paris, where he studied for a few months at the École supérieure des arts et techniques de la mode (ESMOD) like Olivier Rousteing. He then left the program for a position as an artist manager's assistant at Citizen K fashion magazine. The sudden death of his mother prompted him to begin his own career as a fashion designer.

== Career ==
He was 20 years old when he created his brand, Jacquemus, his mother's maiden name. He promoted his designs by having friends wear his creations in shops during Vogue's Fashion Night Out in 2010 in Paris. In 2012, he was invited to present his collection during Paris Fashion Week.

Most of the fabrics used in his collections come from a workwear supplier. The cut is simple, with few details, but original. The prints sometimes recall the world of films by Jacques Tati or Louis Malle. He has described his creations as a "naïve" fashion with a pop of color with unique silhouettes. Having achieved initial interest, his pieces were carried in stores such as Opening Ceremony in New York, Broken Arm in Paris, Gago in Aix-en-Provence and Dover Street Market in London.

In 2014, he designed a collection for La Redoute. In 2015, he received the Special Jury Prize at the LVMH Prize, an international competition created by Delphine Arnault for young fashion designers.

In 2017, Jacquemus added a line of footwear to his collections. He also announced in 2018 that he would be designing menswear, creating the first collection in 2019. In addition to shoes, Jacquemus also designs handbags and hats.

In March 2019, Porte opened the restaurant "Citron", located in the new Galeries Lafayette flagship at Champs-Elysees, at the location of a former Virgin Megastore.

On 24 June 2019, Jacquemus organized a parade to celebrate ten years of the brand, hosting its new collection, Le coup de soleil, in a lavender field. The brand's Spring/Summer 2021 collection took place in a wheat field an hour outside of Paris during the COVID-19 pandemic with only 100 guests in attendance.

Around 2021, Puig acquired a 10 percent stake in Jacquemus with the goal of partnering on a beauty venture, but the plan was aborted and Jacquemus subsequently bought back the stake.

Nike announced a women-focused collection with Jacquemus, with the collaborative capsule first previewed in mid-May 2022. "Having this imagery in mind, we designed women's athletic wear with sensuous details and neutral colors, along with my own interpretation of the Humara, my favorite Nike shoe", said Simon Porte Jacquemus when asked about the inspiration behind the footwear pieces. In 2023, Nike and Jacquemus continued their collaboration as they unveiled a new pair of sneakers called JF1.

In June 2023, Beyoncé was dressed by Jacquemus when she performed in Marseille's Vélodrome. Later in the month, on June 26th, Jacquemus' eponymous brand revealed its Fall 2023 collection at the Palace of Versailles.

The brand has stores in Avenue Montaigne in Paris, SoHo, Manhattan and New Bond Street, London.

In January 2025, it was reported that Sarah Benady, president of Céline North America, would take the CEO position in the company. In February 2025 it was announced that Jacquemus will launch a beauty line in partnership with L’Oréal, and that L’Oréal had invested to retain a minority stake in the brand.

== Personal life ==
Porte married French digital agent Marco Maestri on 28 August 2022 at the town hall of Charleval, Bouches-du-Rhône. On 22 April 2024, the couple announced the birth of their twins, a son and a daughter.

== Awards ==
- 2014: Finalist, LVMH Prize
- 2015: Special Jury LVMH Prize
- 2017: Fashion Director's Choice Award at the Elle Style Awards
- 2024: Chevalier des Arts et des Lettres
