= Aix-Marseille-Provence Metropolis =

Coordinates: 43.2924°N 5.3596°E

Métropole d'Aix-Marseille-Provence
- Métropole
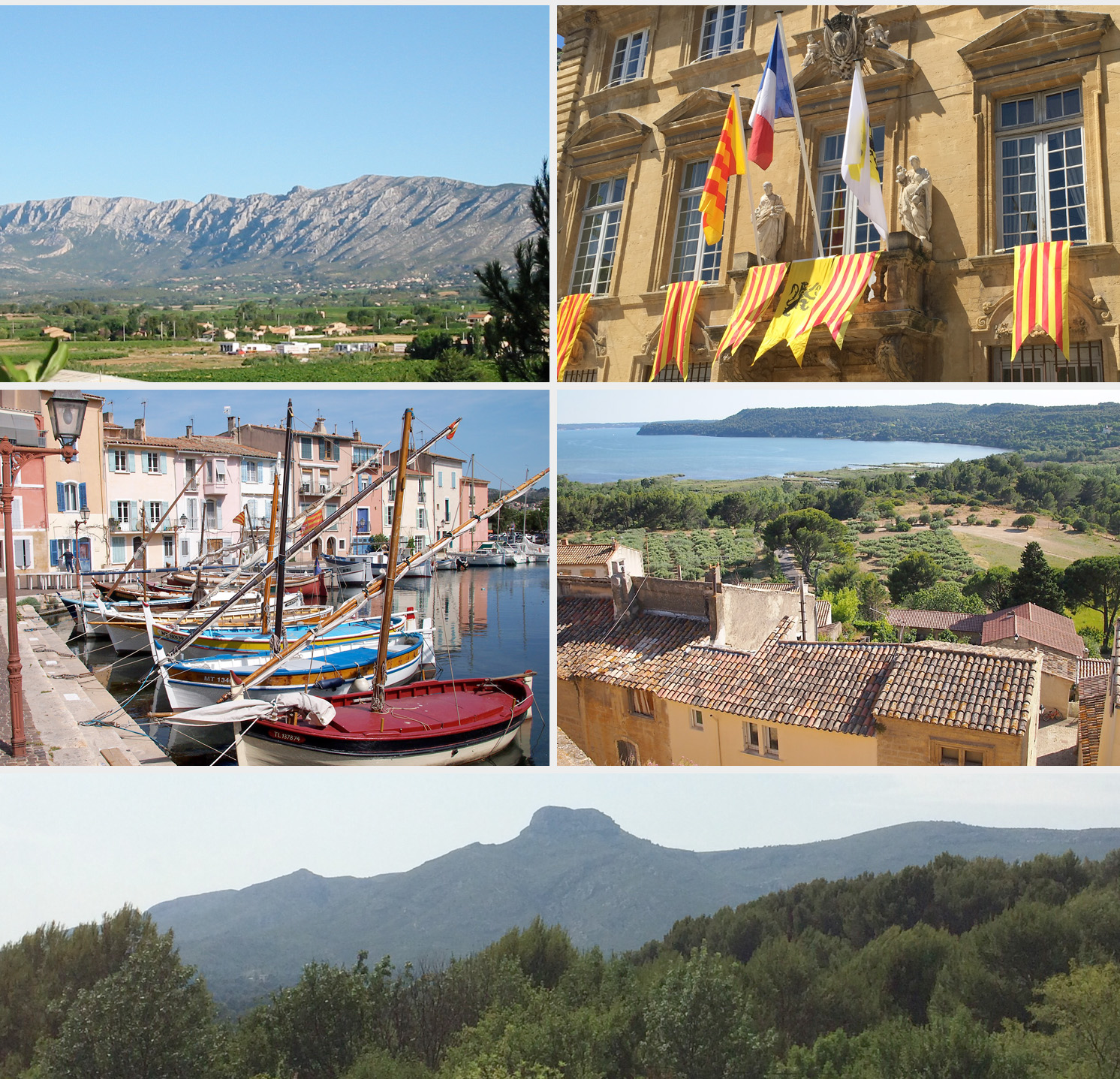

- Territory of the metropolis of Aix-Marseille-Provence (in red the communes of Bouches-du-Rhône, in dark red those of Var and Vaucluse).
- Country: France
- Region: Provence-Alpes-Côte d'Azur
- Department: Bouches-du-Rhône, Var, Vaucluse
- No. of communes: {{{nbcomm}}}
- Established: 1 January 2016
- Area: 3,149.2 km^{2} (1,215.9 sq mi)
- Population (2018): 1,889,666
  - Density: 600.05/km^{2} (1,554.1/sq mi)
- Website: www.ampmetropole.fr

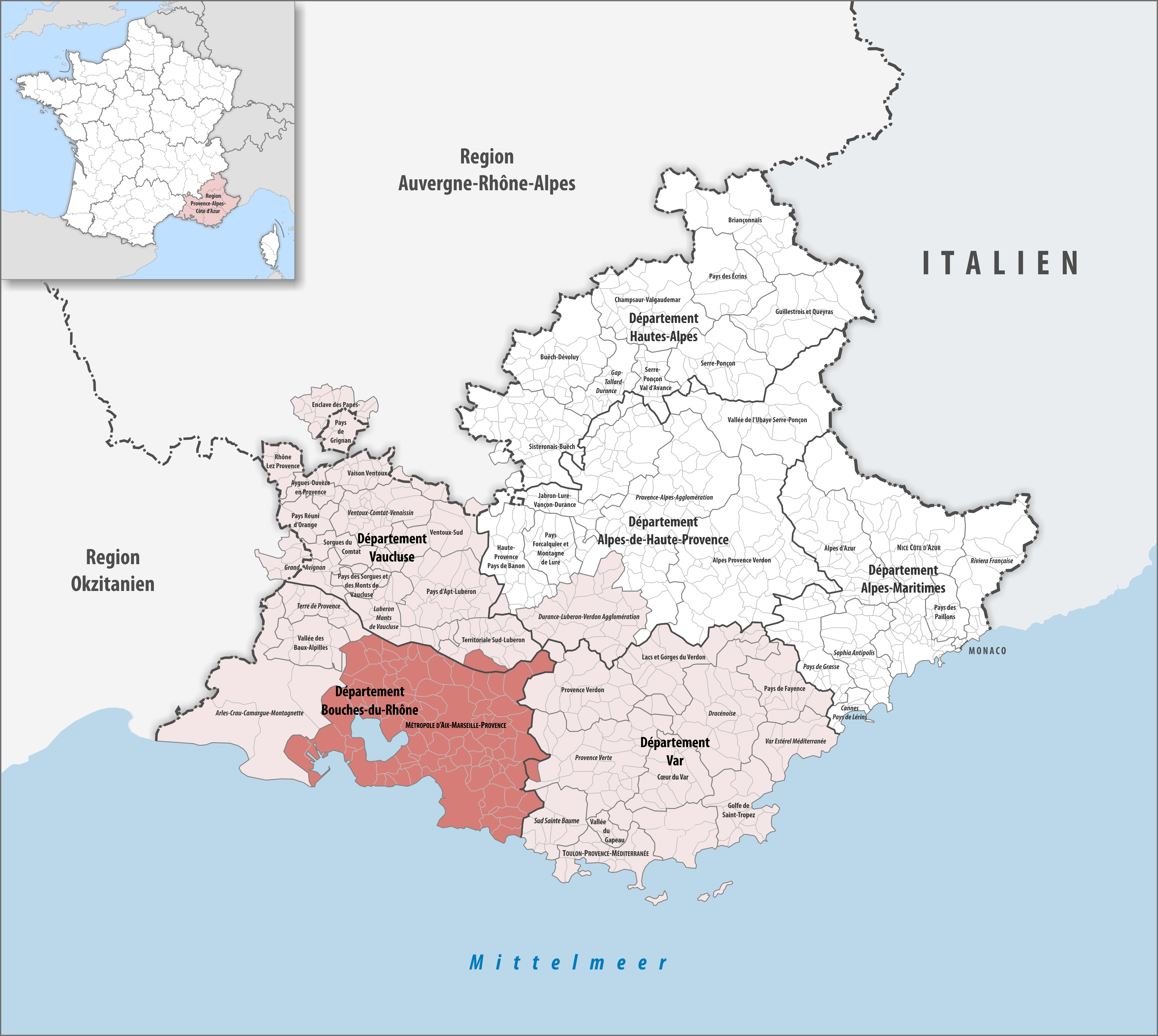

The Aix-Marseille-Provence Metropolis (French: métropole d'Aix-Marseille-Provence, pronounced [metʁɔpɔl dɛks maʁsɛj pʁɔvɑ̃s]) is the métropole, an intercommunal structure, centred on the cities of Marseille and Aix-en-Provence. It is located in the Bouches-du-Rhône, Var and Vaucluse departments, in the Provence-Alpes-Côte d'Azur region, southeastern France. It was created in January 2016, replacing the previous Communauté urbaine Marseille Provence Métropole and five communautés d'agglomération. Its area is 3149.2 km^{2}. Its population was 1,889,666 in 2018, of which 868,277 in Marseille proper and 143,097 in Aix-en-Provence.

== History ==
The Aix-Marseille-Provence Metropolis was formed through the merger of the following communities:

- Urban Community of Marseille Provence Métropole
- Agglomeration Community of Pays d'Aix
- Agglopole Provence
- Ouest Provence
- Agglomeration Community of Pays d'Aubagne et de l'Étoile
- Agglomeration Community of Pays de Martigues

== Communes ==
Of the 92 communes of the métropole d'Aix-Marseille-Provence, 90 are part of the Bouches-du-Rhône department. Pertuis is in Vaucluse, and Saint-Zacharie is in Var.

1. Aix-en-Provence
2. Allauch
3. Alleins
4. Aubagne
5. Auriol
6. Aurons
7. La Barben
8. Beaurecueil
9. Belcodène
10. Berre-l'Étang
11. Bouc-Bel-Air
12. La Bouilladisse
13. Cabriès
14. Cadolive
15. Carnoux-en-Provence
16. Carry-le-Rouet
17. Cassis
18. Ceyreste
19. Charleval
20. Châteauneuf-le-Rouge
21. Châteauneuf-les-Martigues
22. La Ciotat
23. Cornillon-Confoux
24. Coudoux
25. Cuges-les-Pins
26. La Destrousse
27. Éguilles
28. Ensuès-la-Redonne
29. Eyguières
30. La Fare-les-Oliviers
31. Fos-sur-Mer
32. Fuveau
33. Gardanne
34. Gémenos
35. Gignac-la-Nerthe
36. Grans
37. Gréasque
38. Istres
39. Jouques
40. Lamanon
41. Lambesc
42. Lançon-Provence
43. Mallemort
44. Marignane
45. Marseille
46. Martigues
47. Meyrargues
48. Meyreuil
49. Mimet
50. Miramas
51. Pélissanne
52. Les Pennes-Mirabeau
53. La Penne-sur-Huveaune
54. Pertuis
55. Peynier
56. Peypin
57. Peyrolles-en-Provence
58. Plan-de-Cuques
59. Port-de-Bouc
60. Port-Saint-Louis-du-Rhône
61. Puyloubier
62. Le Puy-Sainte-Réparade
63. Rognac
64. Rognes
65. La Roque-d'Anthéron
66. Roquefort-la-Bédoule
67. Roquevaire
68. Rousset
69. Le Rove
70. Saint-Antonin-sur-Bayon
71. Saint-Cannat
72. Saint-Chamas
73. Saint-Estève-Janson
74. Saint-Marc-Jaumegarde
75. Saint-Mitre-les-Remparts
76. Saint-Paul-lès-Durance
77. Saint-Savournin
78. Saint-Victoret
79. Saint-Zacharie
80. Salon-de-Provence
81. Sausset-les-Pins
82. Sénas
83. Septèmes-les-Vallons
84. Simiane-Collongue
85. Le Tholonet
86. Trets
87. Vauvenargues
88. Velaux
89. Venelles
90. Ventabren
91. Vernègues
92. Vitrolles
