= Canton of Aix-en-Provence-I =

Coordinates: 43°31′52″N 5°27′14″E

Aix-en-Provence-I
- Former canton
- Interactive map of Aix-en-Provence-I
- Country: France
- Region: Provence-Alpes-Côte d'Azur
- Department: Bouches-du-Rhône
- No. of communes: {{{nbcomm}}}
- Established: 2003
- Disbanded: 2015
- Population (2012): 41,361

The Canton of Aix-en-Provence-I or Aix-en-Provence-Centre is a former canton located within the commune of Aix-en-Provence in the Bouches-du-Rhône department of France. It had 41,361 inhabitants (2012). It was created on 27 February 2003 by the decree 2003-156 of that date. It was disbanded following the French canton reorganisation which came into effect in March 2015.

Elected to represent the canton in the General Council of Bouches-du-Rhône:

- Bruno Genzana (UMP, 2001-2008)

== Area ==
It is composed of the part of Aix-en-Provence along the centre of a line defined by the axis of the following roads: avenue Eugène-de-Mazenod, avenue Joseph-Rigaud, avenue Georges-Brassens, route des Alpes, ruisseau La Torse, avenue Jean-et-Marcel-Fontenaille, avenue Sainte-Victoire, cours Saint-Louis, boulevard Carnot, cours Gambetta, rue Paul-Beltçaguy, avenue Saint-Jérôme, chemin Robert, boulevard du Roi-René, avenue Benjamin-Abram, voie de chemin de fer, avenue des Belges, avenue de l'Europe, avenue du Petit-Barthélemy, avenue de la Figuière, avenue du Club-Hippique, chemin des Piboules, chemin des Aubépines, chemin des Flâneurs, avenue de l'Europe, route de Valcros, route de Galice, voie de chemin de fer, avenue Jean-Dalmas, cours des Minimes, avenue De Lattre-de-Tassigny, avenue Henri-Pontier, avenue Paul-Cézanne, chemin des Lauves.

=== Neighbourhoods ===
- Centre-ville: Mazarin, Villeneuve, Tanneurs, Ville comtale et Bourg Saint-Sauveur, Ville de Tours
- Sextius-Mirabeau
- Montperrin
- Encagnane
- Val de l'Arc
- Pont de Béraud
- Tour d'Aygosi
- Val Saint-André
- Corsy
- Beisson
- Saint-Eutrope

== See also ==
- Arrondissement of Aix-en-Provence
- Cantons of the Bouches-du-Rhône department
- Communes of the Bouches-du-Rhône department
