= Simiane-Collongue =

Commune in Provence-Alpes-Côte d'Azur, France

- Commune
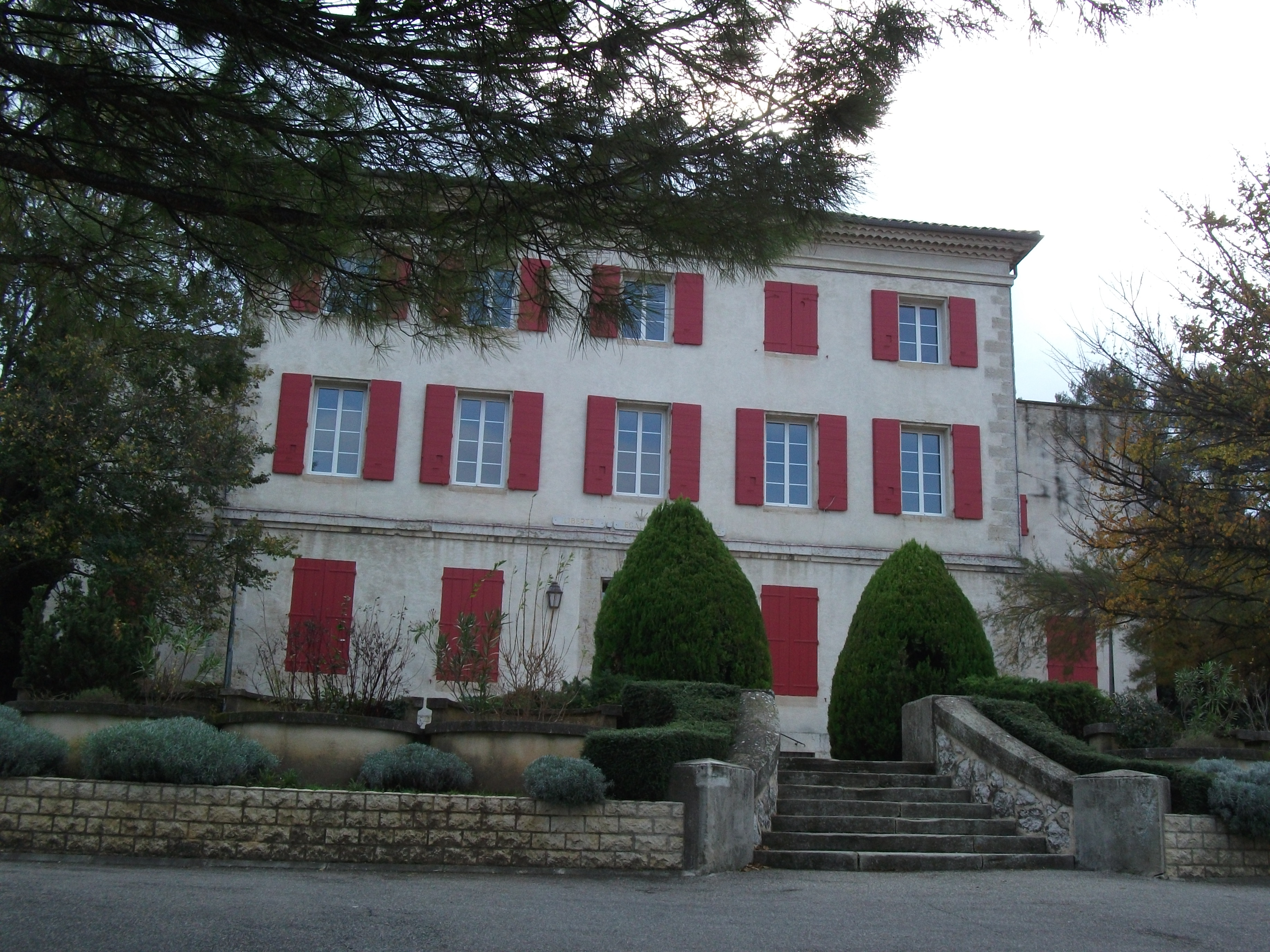
- The town hall of Simiane-Collongue

- Coat of arms
- Location of Simiane-Collongue
- Location within France Location within Provence-Alpes-Côte d'Azur
- Coordinates: 43°25′55″N 5°26′00″E
- Country: France
- Region: Provence-Alpes-Côte d'Azur
- Department: Bouches-du-Rhône
- Arrondissement: Aix-en-Provence
- Canton: Gardanne
- Intercommunality: Aix-Marseille-Provence

Government
  - Mayor (2026–32): Philippe Ardhuin
- Area^{1}: 29.84 km^{2} (11.52 sq mi)
- Elevation: 238 m (781 ft)
- Highest elevation: 711 m (2,333 ft)
- Lowest elevation: 192 m (630 ft)
- Population (2023): 5,780
  - Density: 194/km^{2} (502/sq mi)
- Time zone: UTC+01:00 (CET)
  - Summer (DST): UTC+02:00 (CEST)
- INSEE/Postal code: 13107 /13109
- ^{1} French Land Register data, which excludes lakes, ponds, glaciers > 1 km^{2} (0.386 sq mi or 247 acres) and river estuaries.

Simiane-Collongue (French pronunciation: [simjan kɔlɔ̃g]; Occitan: Simiana) is a commune in the Bouches-du-Rhône department in the Provence-Alpes-Côte d'Azur region of southern France.

== Population ==
Historical population

Year	Pop.	±% p.a.
1793	842	—
1800	784	−1.01%
1806	836	+1.08%
1821	984	+1.09%
1831	992	+0.08%
1836	1,035	+0.85%
1841	1,034	−0.02%
1846	1,020	−0.27%
1851	1,087	+1.28%
1856	1,043	−0.82%
1861	1,060	+0.32%
1866	1,029	−0.59%
1872	1,008	−0.34%
1876	1,071	+1.53%
1881	897	−3.48%
1886	858	−0.89%
1891	786	−1.74%
1896	817	+0.78%
1901	770	−1.18%

Year	Pop.	±% p.a.
1906	752	−0.47%
1911	744	−0.21%
1921	717	−0.37%
1926	754	+1.01%
1931	717	−1.00%
1936	694	−0.65%
1946	787	+1.27%
1954	824	+0.58%
1962	1,123	+3.95%
1968	1,406	+3.82%
1975	1,926	+4.60%
1982	3,030	+6.69%
1990	4,304	+4.48%
1999	5,224	+2.18%
2007	5,947	+1.63%
2012	5,437	−1.78%
2017	5,596	+0.58%
2023	5,780	+0.54%

Source: EHESS and INSEE (1968-2023)

== See also ==
- Communes of the Bouches-du-Rhône department
