= Rognes, Bouches-du-Rhône =

Commune in Provence-Alpes-Côte d'Azur, France

Rognes
- Commune
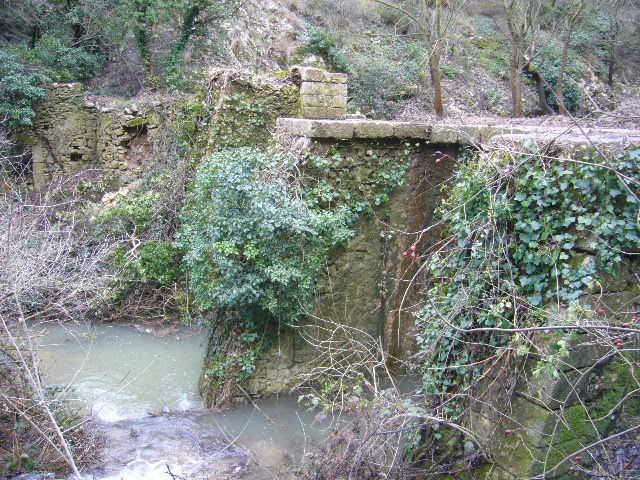
- The dam of the ruined mill of Rossignol, in Rognes

- Coat of arms
- Location of Rognes
- Location within France Location within Provence-Alpes-Côte d'Azur
- Coordinates: 43°39′50″N 5°20′49″E
- Country: France
- Region: Provence-Alpes-Côte d'Azur
- Department: Bouches-du-Rhône
- Arrondissement: Aix-en-Provence
- Canton: Pélissanne
- Intercommunality: Aix-Marseille-Provence

Government
  - Mayor (2026–32): Cédric Orofino
- Area^{1}: 58.32 km^{2} (22.52 sq mi)
- Elevation: 324 m (1,063 ft)
- Highest elevation: 501 m (1,644 ft)
- Lowest elevation: 160 m (520 ft)
- Population (2023): 4,693
  - Density: 80.47/km^{2} (208.4/sq mi)
- Time zone: UTC+01:00 (CET)
  - Summer (DST): UTC+02:00 (CEST)
- INSEE/Postal code: 13082 /13840
- ^{1} French Land Register data, which excludes lakes, ponds, glaciers > 1 km^{2} (0.386 sq mi or 247 acres) and river estuaries.

Rognes (French pronunciation: [ʁɔɲ]; Occitan: Ronha) is a commune in the Bouches-du-Rhône department in southern France.

== Population ==
Historical population

Year	Pop.	±% p.a.
1793	1,919	—
1800	1,960	+0.30%
1806	1,959	−0.01%
1821	1,768	−0.68%
1831	1,641	−0.74%
1836	1,479	−2.06%
1841	1,573	+1.24%
1846	1,677	+1.29%
1851	1,561	−1.42%
1856	1,538	−0.30%
1861	1,578	+0.51%
1866	1,515	−0.81%
1872	1,426	−1.00%
1876	1,617	+3.19%
1881	1,344	−3.63%
1886	1,288	−0.85%
1891	1,215	−1.16%
1896	1,130	−1.44%
1901	1,147	+0.30%

Year	Pop.	±% p.a.
1906	1,156	+0.16%
1911	1,128	−0.49%
1921	918	−2.04%
1926	1,003	+1.79%
1931	1,015	+0.24%
1936	970	−0.90%
1946	1,046	+0.76%
1954	1,017	−0.35%
1962	1,109	+1.09%
1968	1,183	+1.08%
1975	1,426	+2.70%
1982	2,216	+6.50%
1990	3,450	+5.69%
1999	4,194	+2.19%
2007	4,562	+1.06%
2012	4,684	+0.53%
2017	4,735	+0.22%
2023	4,693	−0.15%

Source: EHESS and INSEE (1968-2023)

== See also ==
- 1909 Lambesc earthquake
- Communes of the Bouches-du-Rhône department
