= Mimet =

Commune in Provence-Alpes-Côte d'Azur, France

- Commune
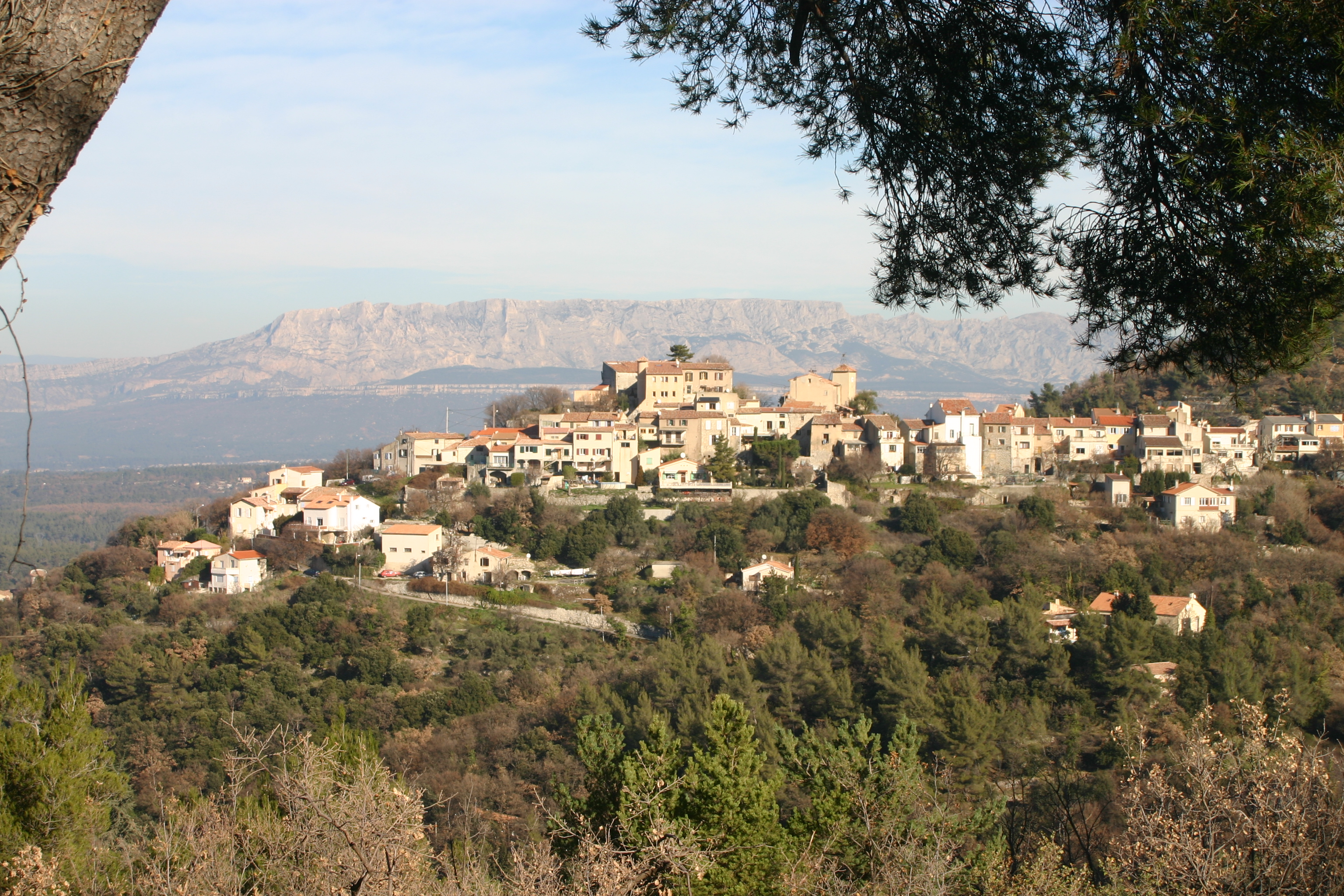
- The village of Mimet

- Coat of arms
- Location of Mimet
- Location within France Location within Provence-Alpes-Côte d'Azur
- Coordinates: 43°24′51″N 5°30′22″E
- Country: France
- Region: Provence-Alpes-Côte d'Azur
- Department: Bouches-du-Rhône
- Arrondissement: Aix-en-Provence
- Canton: Gardanne
- Intercommunality: Aix-Marseille-Provence

Government
  - Mayor (2026–32): Georges Cristiani
- Area^{1}: 18.7 km^{2} (7.2 sq mi)
- Elevation: 512 m (1,680 ft)
- Highest elevation: 782 m (2,566 ft)
- Lowest elevation: 269 m (883 ft)
- Population (2023): 4,241
  - Density: 227/km^{2} (587/sq mi)
- Time zone: UTC+01:00 (CET)
  - Summer (DST): UTC+02:00 (CEST)
- INSEE/Postal code: 13062 /13105
- ^{1} French Land Register data, which excludes lakes, ponds, glaciers > 1 km^{2} (0.386 sq mi or 247 acres) and river estuaries.

Mimet (French pronunciation: [mimɛ]) is a commune in the Bouches-du-Rhône department in southern France.

== Population ==
Historical population

Year	Pop.	±% p.a.
1793	376	—
1800	378	+0.08%
1806	418	+1.69%
1821	464	+0.70%
1831	641	+3.28%
1836	609	−1.02%
1841	585	−0.80%
1846	593	+0.27%
1851	568	−0.86%
1856	584	+0.56%
1861	605	+0.71%
1866	629	+0.78%
1872	647	+0.47%
1876	620	−1.06%
1881	552	−2.30%
1886	542	−0.36%
1891	505	−1.40%
1896	481	−0.97%
1901	440	−1.77%

Year	Pop.	±% p.a.
1906	509	+2.96%
1911	512	+0.12%
1921	618	+1.90%
1926	682	+1.99%
1931	632	−1.51%
1936	610	−0.71%
1946	844	+3.30%
1954	1,253	+5.06%
1962	1,291	+0.37%
1968	1,360	+0.87%
1975	1,476	+1.18%
1982	2,374	+7.02%
1990	3,464	+4.84%
1999	4,151	+2.03%
2007	4,433	+0.82%
2012	4,536	+0.46%
2017	4,482	−0.24%
2023	4,241	−0.92%

Source: EHESS and INSEE (1968-2023)

== See also ==
- Communes of the Bouches-du-Rhône department
