= Canton of Gardanne =

Coordinates: 43.45°N 5.47°E

- Canton
- Situation of the canton of Gardanne in the department of Bouches-du-Rhône
- Country: France
- Region: Provence-Alpes-Côte d'Azur
- Department: Bouches-du-Rhône
- No. of communes: {{{nbcomm}}}
- Population (2023): 66,150
- INSEE code: 1309

The canton of Gardanne is an administrative division of the Bouches-du-Rhône department, in southeastern France. At the French canton reorganisation which came into effect in March 2015, it was expanded from 4 to 5 communes. Its seat is in Gardanne.

It consists of the following communes:

1. Gardanne
2. Mimet
3. Les Pennes-Mirabeau
4. Septèmes-les-Vallons
5. Simiane-Collongue
