= Alleins =

Commune in Provence-Alpes-Côte d'Azur, France

- Commune
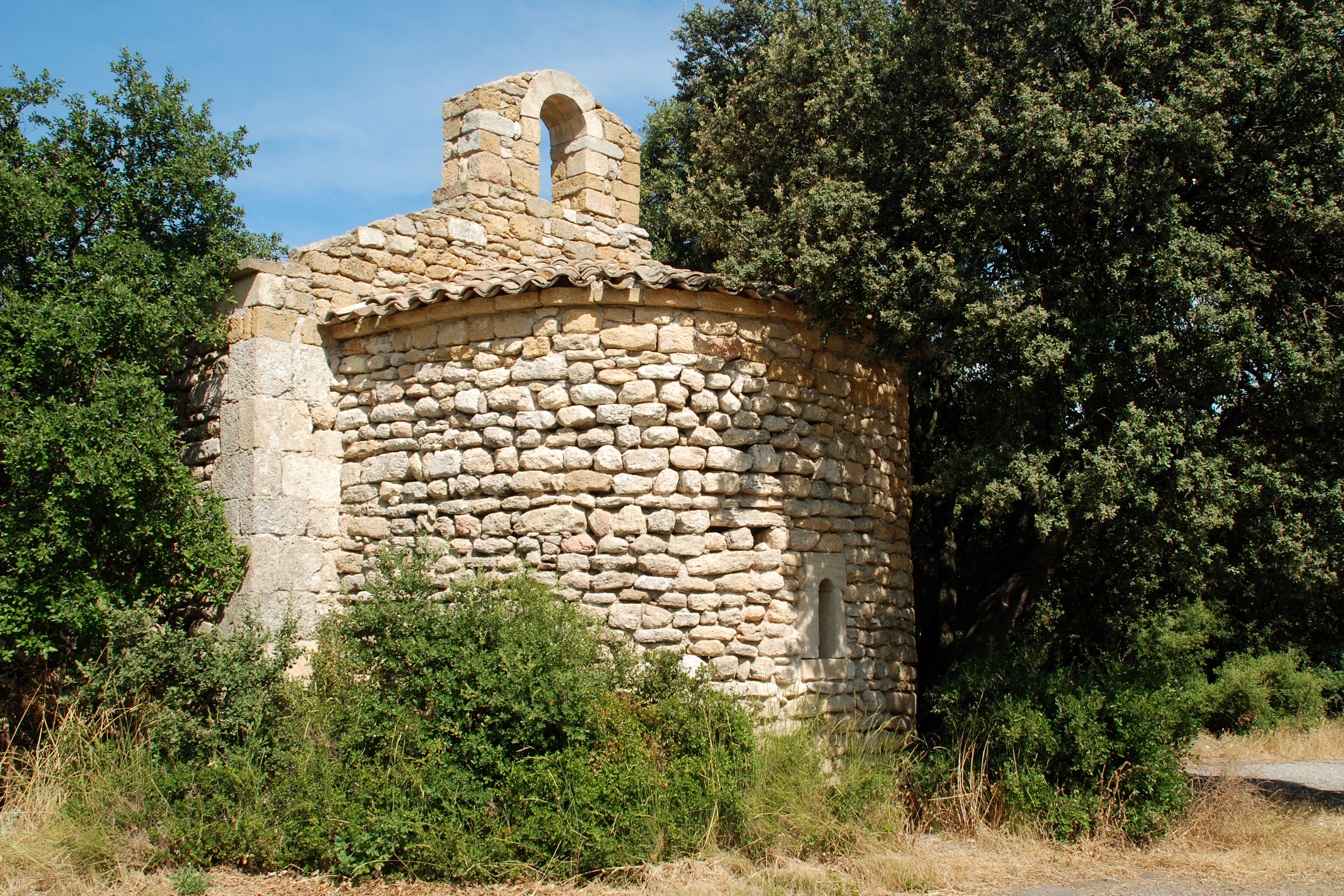
- The Chapel of Saint John

- Coat of arms
- Location of Alleins
- Location within France Location within Provence-Alpes-Côte d'Azur
- Coordinates: 43°42′16″N 5°09′45″E
- Country: France
- Region: Provence-Alpes-Côte d'Azur
- Department: Bouches-du-Rhône
- Arrondissement: Aix-en-Provence
- Canton: Pélissanne
- Intercommunality: Aix-Marseille-Provence

Government
  - Mayor (2026–32): Catherine Moyemont Gaildry
- Area^{1}: 16.78 km^{2} (6.48 sq mi)
- Elevation: 168 m (551 ft)
- Highest elevation: 345 m (1,132 ft)
- Lowest elevation: 104 m (341 ft)
- Population (2023): 2,852
  - Density: 170.0/km^{2} (440.2/sq mi)
- Time zone: UTC+01:00 (CET)
  - Summer (DST): UTC+02:00 (CEST)
- INSEE/Postal code: 13003 /13980
- ^{1} French Land Register data, which excludes lakes, ponds, glaciers > 1 km^{2} (0.386 sq mi or 247 acres) and river estuaries.

Alleins (French pronunciation: [alɛ̃s]; Occitan: Alen) is a commune in the Bouches-du-Rhône department in the Provence-Alpes-Côte d'Azur region of southern France.

== Geography ==
Alleins is located some 45 km southeast of Avignon and 10 km northeast of Salon-de-Provence. It can be accessed by the D16 road from Salon-de-Provence which passes through the village and continues north-east to Mallemort. The D23 road from Lamanon to Mallemort also passes through the north of the commune. The Électricité de France Canal passes through the north of the commune from west to east. Most of the commune is farmland but the whole area south of the village is heavily forested. The TGV Railway line from Avignon to Marseille passes through the commune but there is no station.

== History ==
In April 1545, during the wars of religion, Alleins was pillaged by troops of Paulin de la Garde under the direction of Jean Maynier, the lord of Oppede and first president of the Parliament of Aix. The land was confiscated and the people were massacred.

=== French Revolution ===
A Committee of Revolutionary Surveillance was established in Alleins in 1793. It was made up partly of simple peasants who were sometimes illiterate and this institution somehow marked the democratic heyday of the Revolution. Illiterate members took their place in the debates and turn occupied the place of president. The committee in charge of monitoring the implementation of laws devoted much of their time to reading, copying, and discussing their scope thus contributing to the political and democratic education of citizens. In their primary mission, to arrest suspects, they were very cautious and legalistic unlike the tyrannical reputation of these committees. They also defended the village community, for example in the case of the Statue of Equality which was overturned in June 1794. After investigation, a committee member after meeting the Représentant en mission Maignet spared any untoward consequence for the commune.

=== Heraldry ===
Arms of Alleins	Blazon: Gules, ten lozenges of Or posed 4, 4, 2.

== Administration ==
List of Successive Mayors

From	To	Name	Party
2001	2014	Yves Fabre	DVG
2014	2026	Philippe Grange	DVG
2026	incumbent	Catherine Moyemont Gaildry	

== Population ==
The inhabitants of the commune are known as Alleinois or Alleinoises in French.

Historical population
Year	Pop.	±% p.a.
1968	975	—
1975	1,041	+0.94%
1982	1,224	+2.34%
1990	1,759	+4.64%
1999	2,071	+1.83%
2007	2,424	+1.99%
2012	2,428	+0.03%
2017	2,512	+0.68%
2023	2,852	+2.14%
Source: INSEE

== Culture and heritage ==
=== Civil heritage ===
The commune has two sites that are registered as historical monuments:

- A Bullring (20th century)
- Ancient fragments of the City gate and the Cemetery Chapel (1st century)

=== Religious heritage ===
The commune has two religious sites that are registered as historical monuments:

- The Chapel of the White Penitents (1608). The chapel contains several items that are registered as historical objects:
  - The Wall Panelling with Cathèdres (18th century)
  - 2 Processional Staves of penitence (18th century)
  - 2 Processional Banners: the Immaculate Conception (19th century)
  - A Processional Banner: 2 Penitents kneeling (19th century)
  - A Processional Cross (18th century)
  - A Statue: Saint Joseph (18th century)
  - A Statue, processional dais: Our Lady of Seven Sorrows (19th century)
  - An Altar (19th century)
- The Romanesque Cemetery Chapel of Saint John

Other religious sites

- The Parish Church contains several items that are registered as historical objects:
  - A Painting: The Institution of the Rosary (18th century)
  - 2 Chasses-Reliquaries (19th century)
  - 4 Reliquaries (19th century)
  - A set of 12 Candelabra, 6 large Candelabra, 4 smaller Candelabra with angels, 2 large door Candelabra (19th century)
  - The main Altar (19th century)
  - A Baptismal font (16th century)
- The Cemetery contains a Bas-relief (19th century) which is registered as an historical object.

== See also ==
- Cantons of the Bouches-du-Rhône department
- Communes of the Bouches-du-Rhône department
- Arrondissements of the Bouches-du-Rhône department
