= Canton of Pélissanne =

Coordinates: 43.63°N 5.15°E

- Canton
- Situation of the canton of Pélissanne in the department of Bouches-du-Rhône
- Country: France
- Region: Provence-Alpes-Côte d'Azur
- Department: Bouches-du-Rhône
- No. of communes: {{{nbcomm}}}
- Population (2023): 61,441
- INSEE code: 1325

The canton of Pélissanne is an administrative division of the Bouches-du-Rhône department, in southeastern France. At the French canton reorganisation which came into effect in March 2015, it was expanded from 8 to 13 communes. Its seat is in Pélissanne.

It consists of the following communes:

1. Alleins
2. Aurons
3. La Barben
4. Charleval
5. Éguilles
6. Lambesc
7. Mallemort
8. Pélissanne
9. Rognes
10. La Roque-d'Anthéron
11. Saint-Cannat
12. Saint-Estève-Janson
13. Vernègues
