= Pélissanne =

Commune in Provence-Alpes-Côte d'Azur, France

Pélissanne Peliçana (Occitan)
- Commune
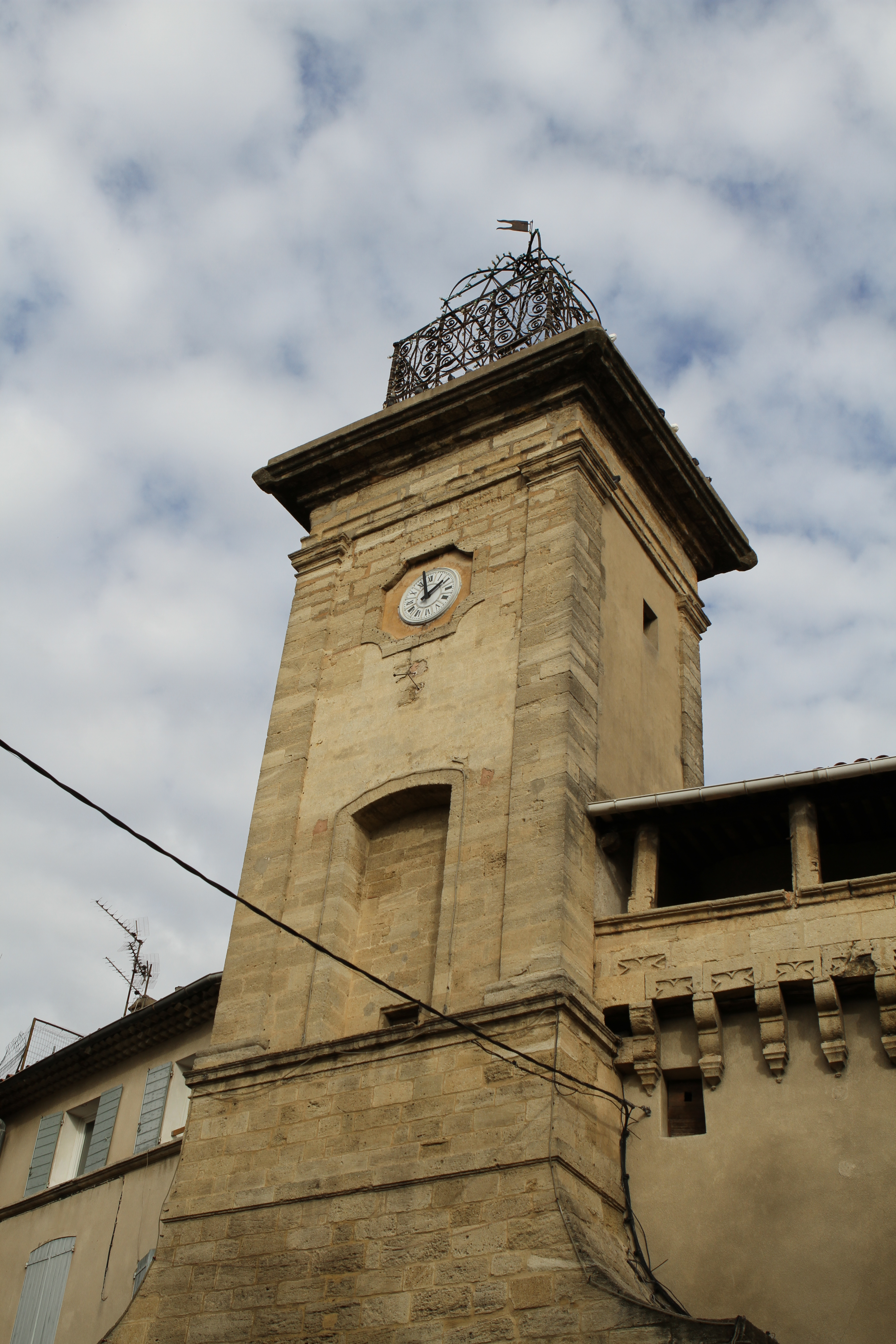
- Beffroi de Pélissanne

- Coat of arms
- Location of Pélissanne
- Location within France Location within Provence-Alpes-Côte d'Azur
- Coordinates: 43°37′56″N 5°09′04″E
- Country: France
- Region: Provence-Alpes-Côte d'Azur
- Department: Bouches-du-Rhône
- Arrondissement: Aix-en-Provence
- Canton: Pélissanne
- Intercommunality: Aix-Marseille-Provence

Government
  - Mayor (2026–32): Pascal Montécot
- Area^{1}: 19.11 km^{2} (7.38 sq mi)
- Elevation: 84 m (276 ft)
- Highest elevation: 295 m (968 ft)
- Lowest elevation: 70 m (230 ft)
- Population (2023): 11,085
  - Density: 580.1/km^{2} (1,502/sq mi)
- Time zone: UTC+01:00 (CET)
  - Summer (DST): UTC+02:00 (CEST)
- INSEE/Postal code: 13069 /13330
- ^{1} French Land Register data, which excludes lakes, ponds, glaciers > 1 km^{2} (0.386 sq mi or 247 acres) and river estuaries.

Pélissanne (French pronunciation: [pelisan]; Occitan: Peliçana, Mistralian norm: Pelissano) is a commune in the Bouches-du-Rhône department in the Provence-Alpes-Côte d'Azur region in Southern France. It is located just east of Salon-de-Provence, within the Aix-Marseille-Provence Metropolis.

== Demographics ==
Historical population

Year	Pop.	±% p.a.
1793	2,440	—
1800	2,600	+0.91%
1806	2,391	−1.39%
1821	2,511	+0.33%
1831	2,500	−0.04%
1836	2,261	−1.99%
1841	2,106	−1.41%
1846	2,112	+0.06%
1851	2,010	−0.99%
1856	1,984	−0.26%
1861	1,946	−0.39%
1866	1,922	−0.25%
1872	1,818	−0.92%
1876	1,724	−1.32%
1881	1,627	−1.15%
1886	1,597	−0.37%
1891	1,533	−0.81%
1896	1,594	+0.78%
1901	1,685	+1.12%

Year	Pop.	±% p.a.
1906	1,558	−1.56%
1911	1,583	+0.32%
1921	1,305	−1.91%
1926	1,400	+1.42%
1931	1,330	−1.02%
1936	1,311	−0.29%
1946	1,631	+2.21%
1954	1,950	+2.26%
1962	2,636	+3.84%
1968	3,505	+4.86%
1975	5,155	+5.67%
1982	6,245	+2.78%
1990	7,341	+2.04%
1999	8,580	+1.75%
2007	9,133	+0.78%
2012	9,601	+1.00%
2017	10,344	+1.50%
2023	11,085	+1.16%

Source: EHESS and INSEE

== See also ==
- Communes of the Bouches-du-Rhône department
