= Mallemort =

Commune in Provence-Alpes-Côte d'Azur, France

- Commune
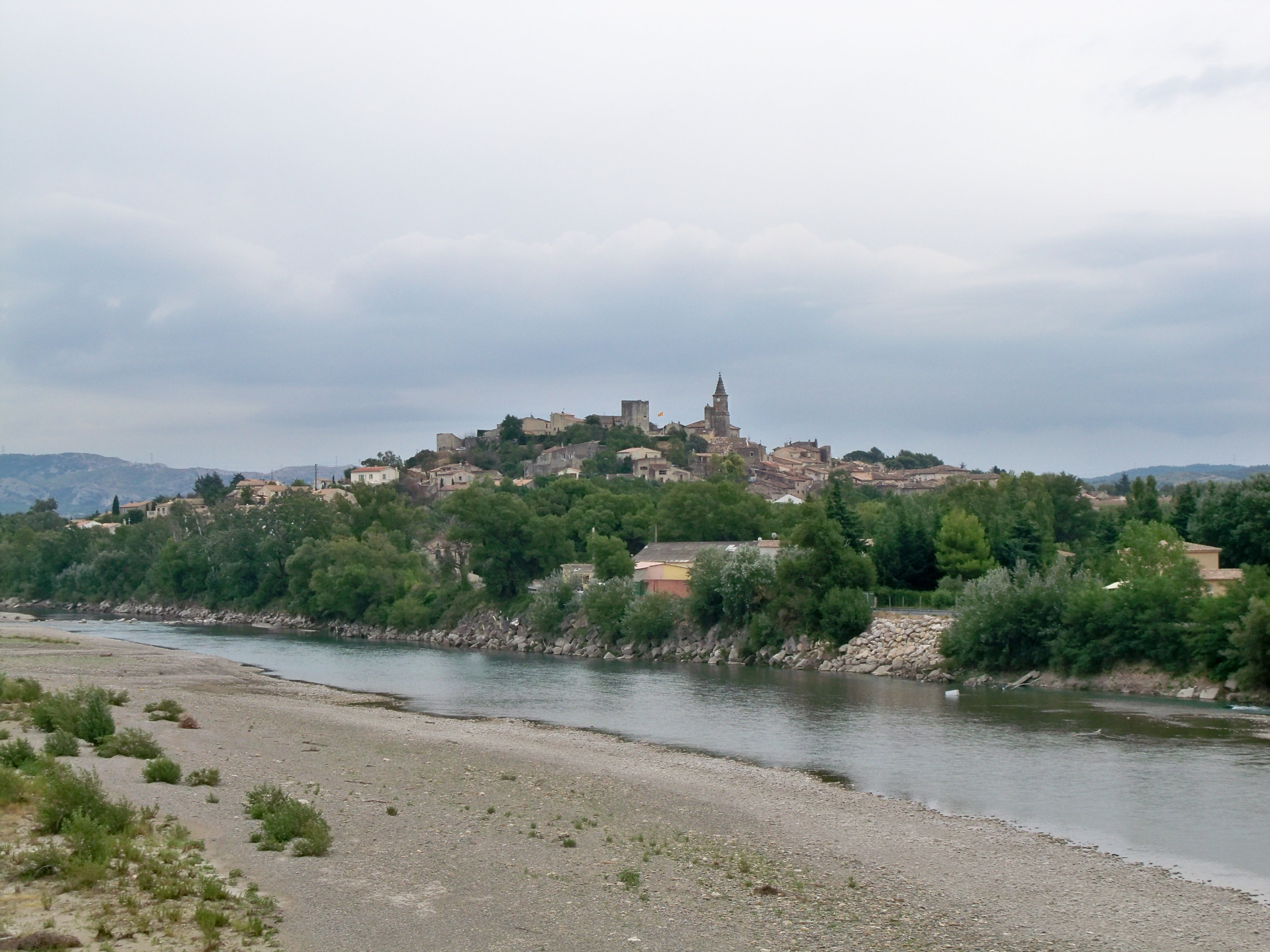
- A general view of Mallemort, with the river in the foreground

- Coat of arms
- Location of Mallemort
- Location within France Location within Provence-Alpes-Côte d'Azur
- Coordinates: 43°43′54″N 5°10′49″E
- Country: France
- Region: Provence-Alpes-Côte d'Azur
- Department: Bouches-du-Rhône
- Arrondissement: Aix-en-Provence
- Canton: Pélissanne
- Intercommunality: Aix-Marseille-Provence

Government
  - Mayor (2026–32): Dimitri Farro
- Area^{1}: 28.16 km^{2} (10.87 sq mi)
- Elevation: 150 m (490 ft)
- Highest elevation: 225 m (738 ft)
- Lowest elevation: 99 m (325 ft)
- Population (2023): 6,166
  - Density: 219.0/km^{2} (567.1/sq mi)
- Time zone: UTC+01:00 (CET)
  - Summer (DST): UTC+02:00 (CEST)
- INSEE/Postal code: 13053 /13370
- ^{1} French Land Register data, which excludes lakes, ponds, glaciers > 1 km^{2} (0.386 sq mi or 247 acres) and river estuaries.

Mallemort (French pronunciation: [malmɔʁ]; Occitan: Malamòrt) is a commune in the Bouches-du-Rhône department in southern France.

Mallemort is a quiet town located on the river Durance, south of the Luberon mountain range. The town itself is 10 km (6.2 mi) off the Autoroute du Soleil (the main motorway to the South and Marseille), within easy reach of Arles, Saint-Rémy, and Salon-de-Provence.

== Climate ==
Climate data for Mallemont (1995-2007)
Month	Jan	Feb	Mar	Apr	May	Jun	Jul	Aug	Sep	Oct	Nov	Dec	Year
Record high °C (°F)	20.0 (68.0)	22.6 (72.7)	22.5 (72.5)	30.1 (86.2)	33.4 (92.1)	37.4 (99.3)	37.5 (99.5)	39.1 (102.4)	33.5 (92.3)	29.6 (85.3)	23.0 (73.4)	19.7 (67.5)	39.1 (102.4)
Mean daily maximum °C (°F)	10.8 (51.4)	12.5 (54.5)	16.7 (62.1)	19.4 (66.9)	24.3 (75.7)	28.7 (83.7)	31.0 (87.8)	30.2 (86.4)	25.4 (77.7)	21.3 (70.3)	14.2 (57.6)	10.7 (51.3)	20.4 (68.8)
Daily mean °C (°F)	6.0 (42.8)	6.9 (44.4)	10.2 (50.4)	13.1 (55.6)	17.6 (63.7)	21.6 (70.9)	23.7 (74.7)	23.3 (73.9)	19.1 (66.4)	15.9 (60.6)	9.5 (49.1)	6.1 (43.0)	14.4 (58.0)
Mean daily minimum °C (°F)	1.2 (34.2)	1.2 (34.2)	3.6 (38.5)	6.8 (44.2)	10.8 (51.4)	14.4 (57.9)	16.4 (61.5)	16.4 (61.5)	12.9 (55.2)	10.4 (50.7)	4.7 (40.5)	1.6 (34.9)	8.4 (47.1)
Record low °C (°F)	−10.5 (13.1)	−10.2 (13.6)	−10.6 (12.9)	−2.3 (27.9)	2.0 (35.6)	4.7 (40.5)	7.1 (44.8)	8.0 (46.4)	4.2 (39.6)	−3.9 (25.0)	−8.4 (16.9)	−11.9 (10.6)	−11.9 (10.6)
Average precipitation mm (inches)	50.2 (1.98)	35.4 (1.39)	32.6 (1.28)	57 (2.2)	47.7 (1.88)	26.7 (1.05)	14.3 (0.56)	47.2 (1.86)	70.5 (2.78)	84.1 (3.31)	65.9 (2.59)	51.6 (2.03)	583.2 (22.91)
Average precipitation days (≥ 1 mm)	5.7	4.7	4.5	7.1	5.9	4	2.3	3	4.8	7.2	7	6	62.2
Source: Meteociel

== Population ==
Historical population

Year	Pop.	±% p.a.
1793	1,757	—
1800	1,757	+0.00%
1806	1,727	−0.29%
1821	1,730	+0.01%
1831	2,123	+2.07%
1836	2,153	+0.28%
1841	2,165	+0.11%
1846	2,356	+1.71%
1851	2,416	+0.50%
1856	2,404	−0.10%
1861	2,395	−0.07%
1866	2,210	−1.59%
1872	2,195	−0.11%
1876	2,130	−0.75%
1881	2,149	+0.18%
1886	2,147	−0.02%
1891	2,059	−0.83%
1896	2,201	+1.34%
1901	2,215	+0.13%

Year	Pop.	±% p.a.
1906	2,195	−0.18%
1911	2,259	+0.58%
1921	1,979	−1.31%
1926	1,867	−1.16%
1931	1,969	+1.07%
1936	2,141	+1.69%
1946	2,221	+0.37%
1954	2,427	+1.11%
1962	3,029	+2.81%
1968	3,090	+0.33%
1975	3,344	+1.13%
1982	3,946	+2.39%
1990	4,366	+1.27%
1999	4,984	+1.48%
2007	5,676	+1.64%
2012	6,197	+1.77%
2017	6,019	−0.58%
2023	6,166	+0.40%

Source: EHESS and INSEE (1968-2023)

== Notable people ==
- Jean Boutière, philologist
- Simon Porte Jacquemus, fashion designer
- Camille Roqueplan, painter

== See also ==
- Communes of the Bouches-du-Rhône department
