= Charleval, Bouches-du-Rhône =

Commune in Provence-Alpes-Côte d'Azur, France

Charleval
- Commune
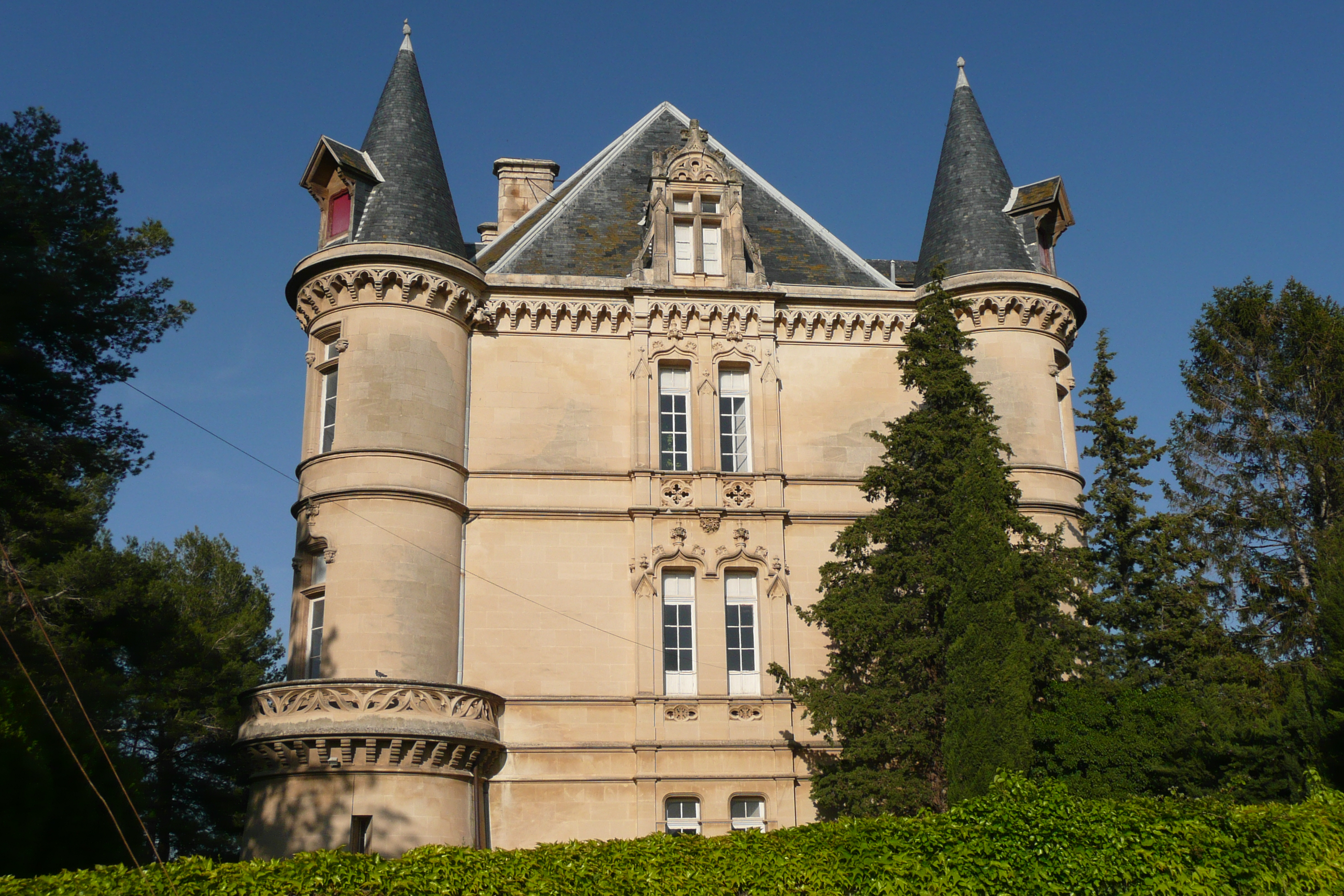
- Chateau

- Coat of arms
- Location of Charleval
- Location within France Location within Provence-Alpes-Côte d'Azur
- Coordinates: 43°43′11″N 5°14′47″E
- Country: France
- Region: Provence-Alpes-Côte d'Azur
- Department: Bouches-du-Rhône
- Canton: Pélissanne
- Intercommunality: Aix-Marseille-Provence

Government
  - Mayor (2026–32): Christophe Hocmard
- Area^{1}: 14.41 km^{2} (5.56 sq mi)
- Elevation: 139 m (456 ft)
- Highest elevation: 390 m (1,280 ft)
- Lowest elevation: 121 m (397 ft)
- Population (2023): 2,640
  - Density: 183/km^{2} (475/sq mi)
- Time zone: UTC+01:00 (CET)
  - Summer (DST): UTC+02:00 (CEST)
- INSEE/Postal code: 13024 /13350
- ^{1} French Land Register data, which excludes lakes, ponds, glaciers > 1 km^{2} (0.386 sq mi or 247 acres) and river estuaries.

Charleval (French pronunciation: [ʃaʁləval]) is a commune in the Bouches-du-Rhône department in southern France.

== Population ==
Historical population

Year	Pop.	±% p.a.
1793	464	—
1800	572	+3.03%
1806	598	+0.74%
1821	746	+1.49%
1831	909	+2.00%
1836	947	+0.82%
1841	939	−0.17%
1846	1,001	+1.29%
1851	966	−0.71%
1856	1,076	+2.18%
1861	1,054	−0.41%
1866	1,067	+0.25%
1872	1,021	−0.73%
1876	1,073	+1.25%
1881	1,022	−0.97%
1886	947	−1.51%
1891	934	−0.28%
1896	965	+0.66%
1901	921	−0.93%

Year	Pop.	±% p.a.
1906	900	−0.46%
1911	891	−0.20%
1921	904	+0.14%
1926	1,008	+2.20%
1931	1,004	−0.08%
1936	996	−0.16%
1946	966	−0.31%
1954	1,005	+0.50%
1962	1,347	+3.73%
1968	1,278	−0.87%
1975	1,417	+1.49%
1982	1,684	+2.50%
1990	1,877	+1.37%
1999	2,080	+1.15%
2007	2,360	+1.59%
2012	2,515	+1.28%
2017	2,700	+1.43%
2023	2,640	−0.37%

Source: EHESS and INSEE (1968-2023)

== See also ==
- Communes of the Bouches-du-Rhône department
