= Canton of Tarascon =

Former French canton in the Bouches-du-Rhône département

Coordinates: 43°48′21″N 4°39′37″E

The Canton of Tarascon is a former French canton located in the Bouches-du-Rhône département of France, in the arrondissement of Arles. It had 18,091 inhabitants (2012). It was disbanded following the French canton reorganisation which came into effect in March 2015.

Conseiller Général: Lucien Limousin (UMP)

It comprised the following communes:

- Boulbon
- Mas-Blanc-des-Alpilles
- Saint-Étienne-du-Grès
- Saint-Pierre-de-Mézoargues
- Tarascon
