= Graveson (disambiguation) =

Graveson is commune in the Bouches-du-Rhône department in southern France.

Graveson may also refer to:

- Jan Graveson (born 1965 in Easington, County Durham) is an English actress and singer
- Graveson Glacier, glacier in Antarctica
- Samuel Graveson (1868–1957) was a British printer and philatelist
