= Communes of the Bouches-du-Rhône department =

The following is a list of the 119 communes of the Bouches-du-Rhône department of France.

The communes cooperate in the following intercommunalities (as of 2025):

- Métropole d'Aix-Marseille-Provence (partly)
- Communauté d'agglomération Arles-Crau-Camargue-Montagnette
- Communauté d'agglomération Terre de Provence
- Communauté de communes Vallée des Baux-Alpilles

INSEE	Postal	Commune
13001	13090	Aix-en-Provence
13002	13190	Allauch
13003	13980	Alleins
13004	13200	Arles
13005	13400	Aubagne
13006	13930	Aureille
13007	13390	Auriol
13008	13121	Aurons
13009	13330	La Barben
13010	13570	Barbentane
13011	13520	Les Baux-de-Provence
13012	13100	Beaurecueil
13013	13720	Belcodène
13014	13130	Berre-l'Étang
13015	13320	Bouc-Bel-Air
13016	13720	La Bouilladisse
13017	13150	Boulbon
13018	13440	Cabannes
13019	13480	Cabriès
13020	13950	Cadolive
13119	13470	Carnoux-en-Provence
13021	13620	Carry-le-Rouet
13022	13260	Cassis
13023	13600	Ceyreste
13024	13350	Charleval
13025	13790	Châteauneuf-le-Rouge
13026	13220	Châteauneuf-les-Martigues
13027	13160	Châteaurenard
13028	13600	La Ciotat
13029	13250	Cornillon-Confoux
13118	13111	Coudoux
13030	13780	Cuges-les-Pins
13031	13112	La Destrousse
13032	13510	Éguilles
13033	13820	Ensuès-la-Redonne
13034	13810	Eygalières
13035	13430	Eyguières
13036	13630	Eyragues
13037	13580	La Fare-les-Oliviers
13038	13990	Fontvieille
13039	13270	Fos-sur-Mer
13040	13710	Fuveau
13041	13120	Gardanne
13042	13420	Gémenos
13043	13180	Gignac-la-Nerthe
13044	13450	Grans
13045	13690	Graveson
13046	13850	Gréasque
13047	13800	Istres
13048	13490	Jouques
13049	13113	Lamanon
13050	13410	Lambesc
13051	13680	Lançon-Provence
13052	13910	Maillane
13053	13370	Mallemort
13054	13700	Marignane
13055	13001, 13002, 13003, 13004, 13005, 13006, 13007, 13008, 13009, 13010, 13011, 13012, 13013, 13014, 13015, 13016	Marseille

INSEE	Postal	Commune
13056	13500	Martigues
13057	13103	Mas-Blanc-des-Alpilles
13058	13520	Maussane-les-Alpilles
13059	13650	Meyrargues
13060	13590	Meyreuil
13062	13105	Mimet
13063	13140	Miramas
13064	13940	Mollégès
13065	13890	Mouriès
13066	13550	Noves
13067	13660	Orgon
13068	13520	Paradou
13069	13330	Pélissanne
13071	13170	Les Pennes-Mirabeau
13070	13821	La Penne-sur-Huveaune
13072	13790	Peynier
13073	13124	Peypin
13074	13860	Peyrolles-en-Provence
13075	13380	Plan-de-Cuques
13076	13750	Plan-d'Orgon
13077	13110	Port-de-Bouc
13078	13230	Port-Saint-Louis-du-Rhône
13079	13114	Puyloubier
13080	13610	Le Puy-Sainte-Réparade
13081	13340	Rognac
13082	13840	Rognes
13083	13870	Rognonas
13084	13640	La Roque-d'Anthéron
13085	13830	Roquefort-la-Bédoule
13086	13360	Roquevaire
13087	13790	Rousset
13088	13740	Le Rove
13089	13670	Saint-Andiol
13090	13100	Saint-Antonin-sur-Bayon
13091	13760	Saint-Cannat
13092	13250	Saint-Chamas
13096	13460	Saintes-Maries-de-la-Mer
13093	13610	Saint-Estève-Janson
13094	13103	Saint-Étienne-du-Grès
13095	13100	Saint-Marc-Jaumegarde
13097	13310	Saint-Martin-de-Crau
13098	13920	Saint-Mitre-les-Remparts
13099	13115	Saint-Paul-lès-Durance
13061	13150	Saint-Pierre-de-Mézoargues
13100	13210	Saint-Rémy-de-Provence
13101	13119	Saint-Savournin
13102	13730	Saint-Victoret
13103	13300	Salon-de-Provence
13104	13960	Sausset-les-Pins
13105	13560	Sénas
13106	13240	Septèmes-les-Vallons
13107	13109	Simiane-Collongue
13108	13150	Tarascon
13109	13100	Le Tholonet
13110	13530	Trets
13111	13126	Vauvenargues
13112	13880	Velaux
13113	13770	Venelles
13114	13122	Ventabren
13115	13116	Vernègues
13116	13670	Verquières
13117	13127	Vitrolles

== List of communes ==
List of the 119 communes of the Bouches-du-Rhône department on 1 January 2024
Name	Code INSEE	Postal code	Arrondissement	Canton	Intercommunality	Area (km^{2})	Population (2021)	Population density (per km^{2})
Marseille _{(prefecture)}	13055	13001 to 13016	Marseille	Marseille-1; Marseille-2; Marseille-3; Marseille-4; Marseille-5; Marseille-6; Marseille-7; Marseille-8; Marseille-9; Marseille-10; Marseille-11; Marseille-12	Aix-Marseille-Provence Metropolis	240.62	873,076	3,628
Aix-en-Provence	13001	13080; 13090; 13100; 13290; 13540	Aix-en-Provence	Aix-en-Provence-1; Aix-en-Provence-2	Aix-Marseille-Provence Metropolis	186.08	147,478	793
Allauch	13002	13190	Marseille	Allauch	Aix-Marseille-Provence Metropolis	50.30	21,490	427
