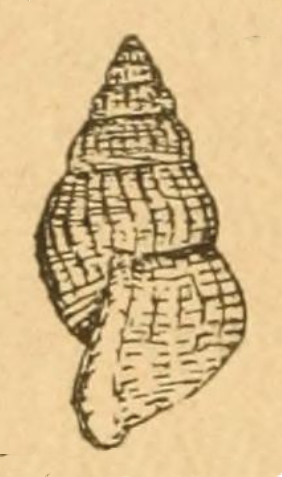
- Shell of Alvania urgonensis (holotype)

Scientific classification
- Kingdom: Animalia
- Phylum: Mollusca
- Class: Gastropoda
- Subclass: Caenogastropoda
- Order: Littorinimorpha
- Superfamily: Rissooidea
- Family: Rissoidae
- Genus: Alvania
- Species: †A. urgonensis

Binomial name
- †Alvania urgonensis Cossmann, 1918

= Alvania urgonensis =

Species of gastropod

Alvania urgonensis is an extinct species of minute sea snail, a marine gastropod mollusc or micromollusk in the family Rissoidae.

== Description ==
The length of the shell attains 3.5 mm, its diameter is 1.25 mm.

== Distribution ==
Fossils of this species have been found in the Barremian strata (Cretaceous) near Orgon, southern France after several research studies.
