= Verquières =

Commune in Provence-Alpes-Côte d'Azur, France

- Commune
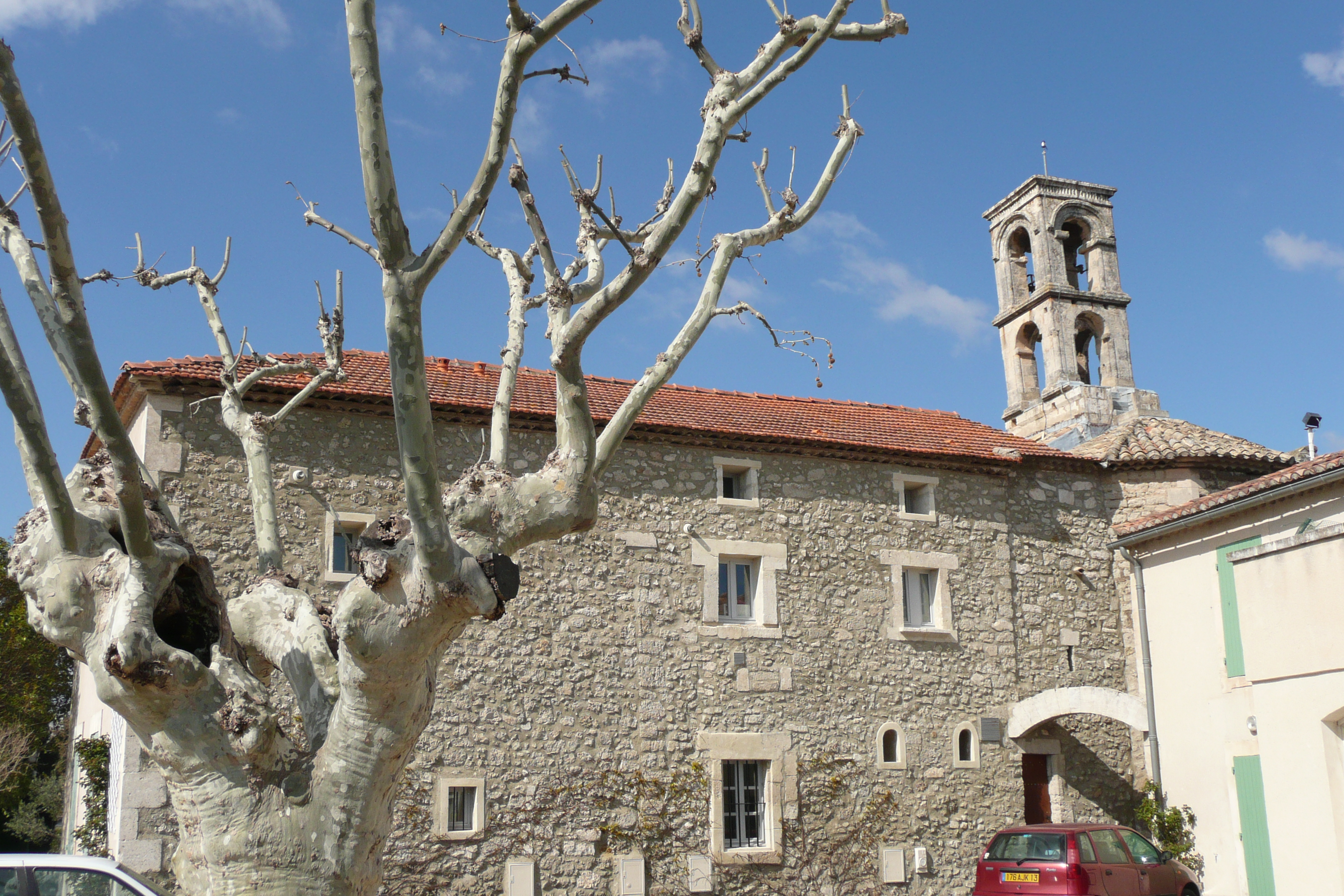
- The church in Verquières

- Coat of arms
- Location of Verquières
- Location within France Location within Provence-Alpes-Côte d'Azur
- Coordinates: 43°50′27″N 4°55′09″E
- Country: France
- Region: Provence-Alpes-Côte d'Azur
- Department: Bouches-du-Rhône
- Arrondissement: Arles
- Canton: Châteaurenard
- Intercommunality: CA Terre de Provence

Government
  - Mayor (2026–32): Jean-Marc Martin-Teisserre
- Area^{1}: 4.91 km^{2} (1.90 sq mi)
- Elevation: 49 m (161 ft)
- Highest elevation: 51 m (167 ft)
- Lowest elevation: 45 m (148 ft)
- Population (2023): 772
  - Density: 157/km^{2} (407/sq mi)
- Time zone: UTC+01:00 (CET)
  - Summer (DST): UTC+02:00 (CEST)
- INSEE/Postal code: 13116 /13670
- ^{1} French Land Register data, which excludes lakes, ponds, glaciers > 1 km^{2} (0.386 sq mi or 247 acres) and river estuaries.

Verquières (French pronunciation: [vɛʁkjɛʁ]; Occitan: Verquiera) is a commune in the Bouches-du-Rhône department in southern France.

== History ==
Towards the middle of the 12th century when the manor fell Diocese of Avignon on which city had been built. The parish was removed and attached to Saint-Andiol, and then restored in 1841.

Aside from his Mas Provençal, very typical include its castle and the Jesuit Church of St. Vérédème, fortified 14th century and enlarged in the 19th.

Its features: a massive square tower and spire serving his masons' marks, its barrel-vaulted nave broken, its apse semi-circular buttresses crowned with watch towers.

There are also beautiful wrought iron cross, very ornate they are due to the dexterity of the Reverend Roy who was pastor of the town from 1876 to 1894.

== Population ==
Historical population
Year	Pop.	±% p.a.
1968	335	—
1975	316	−0.83%
1982	508	+7.02%
1990	654	+3.21%
1999	801	+2.28%
2007	776	−0.40%
2012	799	+0.59%
2017	818	+0.47%
2023	772	−0.96%
Source: INSEE

== See also ==
- Communes of the Bouches-du-Rhône department
