= Arrondissement of Arles =

Coordinates: 43°41′N 4°37′E

Arles
- Arrondissement
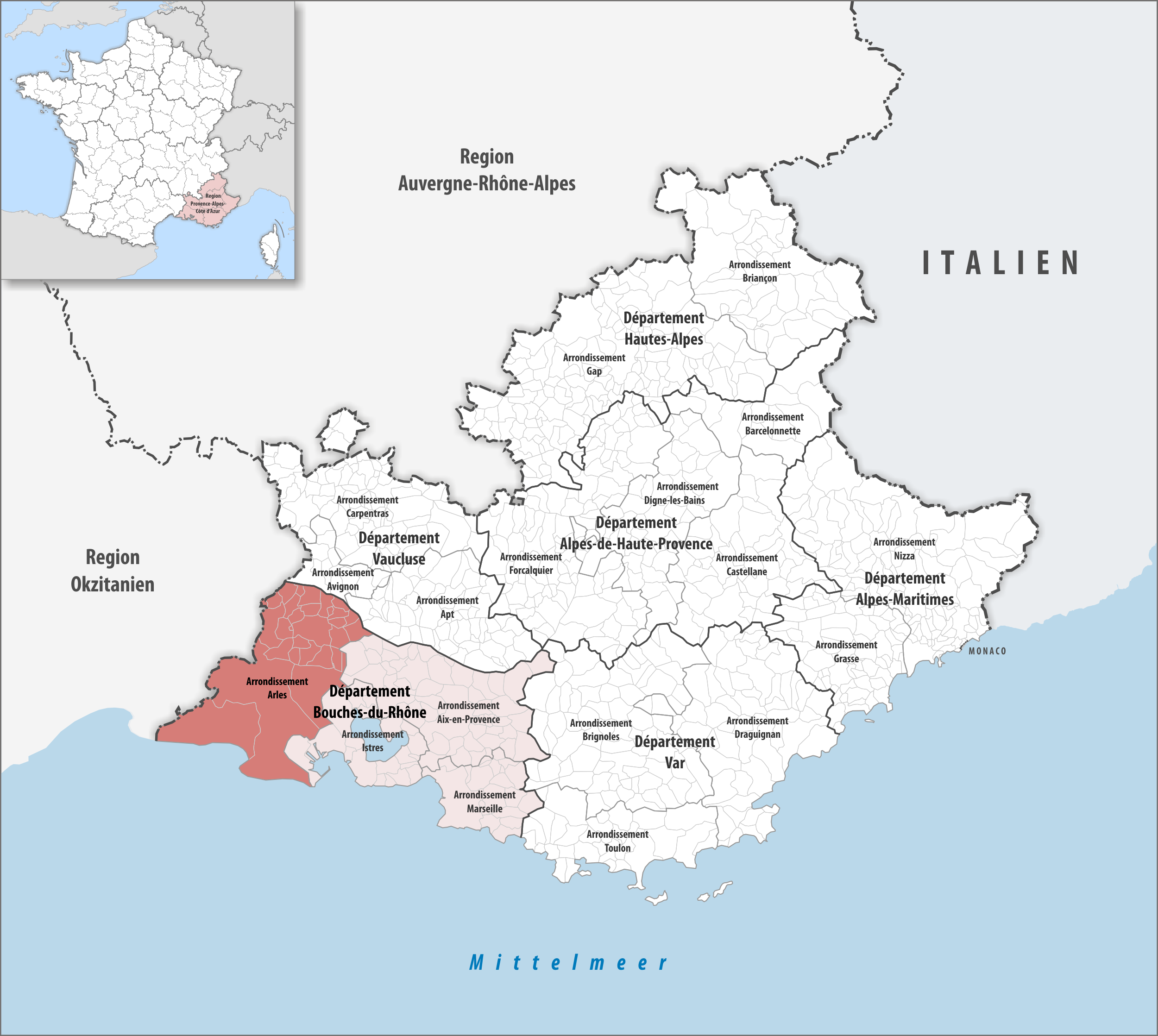
- Location within the region Provence-Alpes-Côte d'Azur
- Country: France
- Region: Provence-Alpes-Côte d'Azur
- Department: Bouches-du-Rhône
- No. of communes: {{{nbcomm}}}
- Area: 2,031.5 km^{2} (784.4 sq mi)
- Population (2023): 174,008
  - Density: 85.655/km^{2} (221.85/sq mi)
- INSEE code: 132

The arrondissement of Arles is an arrondissement of France in the Bouches-du-Rhône department in the Provence-Alpes-Côte d'Azur region. It has 29 communes. Its population is 171,575 (2021), and its area is 2,031.5 km^{2} (784.4 sq mi).

== Composition ==
The communes of the arrondissement of Arles, and their INSEE codes, are:

1. Arles (13004)
2. Aureille (13006)
3. Barbentane (13010)
4. Les Baux-de-Provence (13011)
5. Boulbon (13017)
6. Cabannes (13018)
7. Châteaurenard (13027)
8. Eygalières (13034)
9. Eyragues (13036)
10. Fontvieille (13038)
11. Graveson (13045)
12. Maillane (13052)
13. Mas-Blanc-des-Alpilles (13057)
14. Maussane-les-Alpilles (13058)
15. Mollégès (13064)
16. Mouriès (13065)
17. Noves (13066)
18. Orgon (13067)
19. Paradou (13068)
20. Plan-d'Orgon (13076)
21. Rognonas (13083)
22. Saint-Andiol (13089)
23. Saintes-Maries-de-la-Mer (13096)
24. Saint-Étienne-du-Grès (13094)
25. Saint-Martin-de-Crau (13097)
26. Saint-Pierre-de-Mézoargues (13061)
27. Saint-Rémy-de-Provence (13100)
28. Tarascon (13108)
29. Verquières (13116)

== History ==
The arrondissement of Tarascon was created in 1800. The subprefecture was moved to Arles in 1817. At the March 2017 reorganization of the arrondissements of Bouches-du-Rhône, it lost six communes to the arrondissement of Aix-en-Provence and one commune to the arrondissement of Istres.

As a result of the reorganisation of the cantons of France which came into effect in 2015, the borders of the cantons are no longer related to the borders of the arrondissements. The cantons of the arrondissement of Arles were, as of January 2015:

1. Arles-Est
2. Arles-Ouest
3. Châteaurenard
4. Eyguières
5. Orgon
6. Port-Saint-Louis-du-Rhône
7. Saint-Rémy-de-Provence
8. Saintes-Maries-de-la-Mer
9. Tarascon
