= Maillane =

Commune in Provence-Alpes-Côte d'Azur, France

- Commune
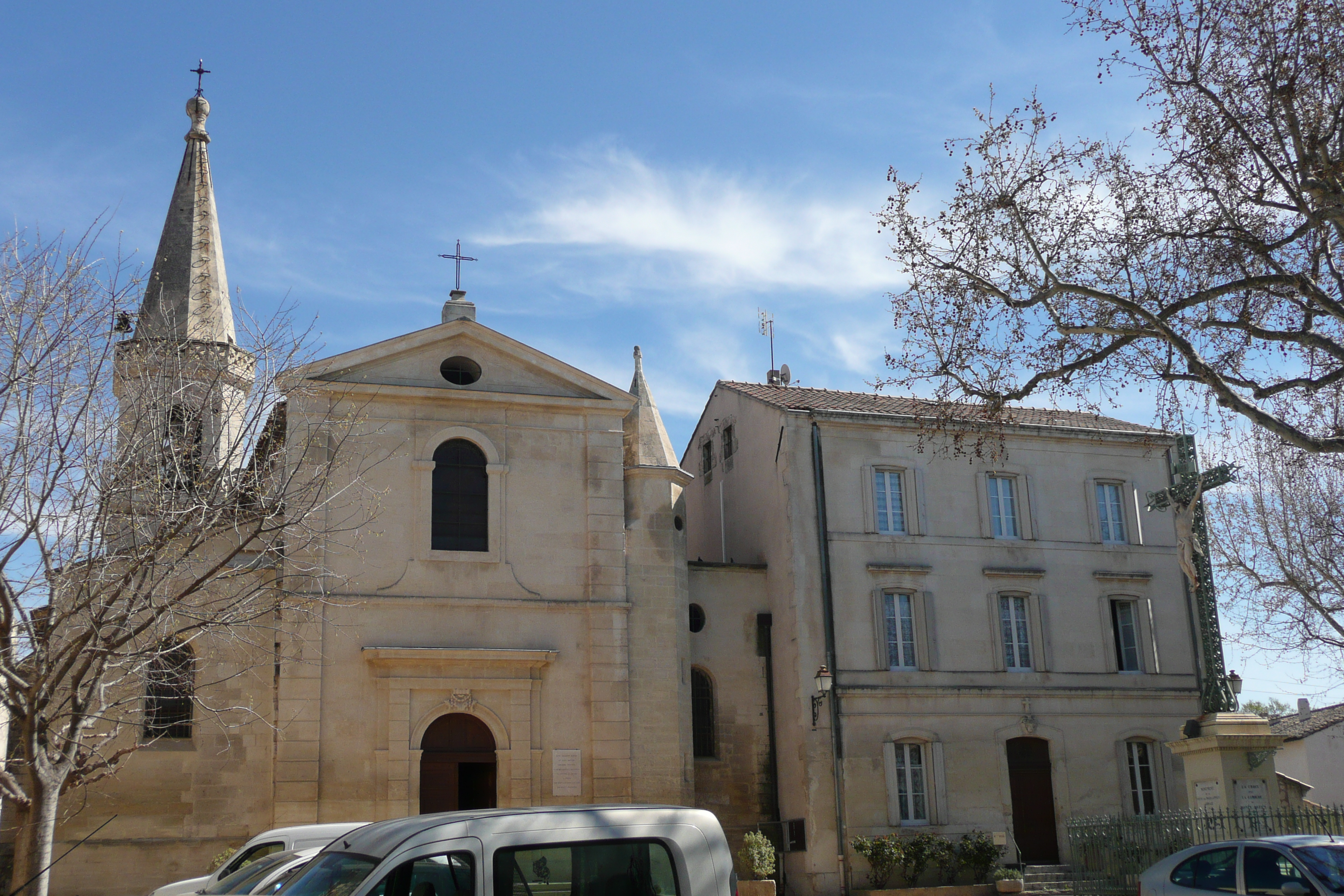
- The church of Maillane

- Coat of arms
- Location of Maillane
- Location within France Location within Provence-Alpes-Côte d'Azur
- Coordinates: 43°50′01″N 4°46′58″E
- Country: France
- Region: Provence-Alpes-Côte d'Azur
- Department: Bouches-du-Rhône
- Arrondissement: Arles
- Canton: Châteaurenard
- Intercommunality: CA Terre de Provence

Government
  - Mayor (2026–32): Éric Lecoffre
- Area^{1}: 16.77 km^{2} (6.47 sq mi)
- Elevation: 12 m (39 ft)
- Highest elevation: 17 m (56 ft)
- Lowest elevation: 7 m (23 ft)
- Population (2023): 2,775
  - Density: 165.5/km^{2} (428.6/sq mi)
- Time zone: UTC+01:00 (CET)
  - Summer (DST): UTC+02:00 (CEST)
- INSEE/Postal code: 13052 /13910
- ^{1} French Land Register data, which excludes lakes, ponds, glaciers > 1 km^{2} (0.386 sq mi or 247 acres) and river estuaries.

Maillane (French pronunciation: [majan]; Occitan: Malhana) is a commune in the Bouches-du-Rhône department in southern France in the former province of Provence.

== Geography ==
Maillane is located 7 km (4.3 mi) north-west of Saint-Rémy-de-Provence and 15 km (9.3 mi) north-east of Tarascon.

== Population ==
Historical population

Year	Pop.	±% p.a.
1793	1,200	—
1800	1,324	+1.41%
1806	1,273	−0.65%
1821	1,386	+0.57%
1831	1,505	+0.83%
1836	1,356	−2.06%
1841	1,430	+1.07%
1846	1,507	+1.05%
1851	1,556	+0.64%
1856	1,522	−0.44%
1861	1,541	+0.25%
1866	1,532	−0.12%
1872	1,480	−0.57%
1876	1,390	−1.56%
1881	1,347	−0.63%
1886	1,342	−0.07%
1891	1,383	+0.60%
1896	1,347	−0.53%
1901	1,373	+0.38%

Year	Pop.	±% p.a.
1906	1,369	−0.06%
1911	1,407	+0.55%
1921	1,325	−0.60%
1926	1,354	+0.43%
1931	1,372	+0.26%
1936	1,308	−0.95%
1946	1,315	+0.05%
1954	1,306	−0.09%
1962	1,354	+0.45%
1968	1,472	+1.40%
1975	1,430	−0.41%
1982	1,571	+1.35%
1990	1,664	+0.72%
1999	1,880	+1.37%
2007	2,156	+1.73%
2012	2,437	+2.48%
2017	2,582	+1.16%
2023	2,775	+1.21%

Source: EHESS and INSEE (1968-2023)

== People ==
Maillane was the birthplace of the 19th century poet Frédéric Mistral (1904 Nobel Prize in Literature winner and founder of Felibrige).

== See also ==
- Communes of the Bouches-du-Rhône department
