= Plan-d'Orgon =

Commune in Provence-Alpes-Côte d'Azur, France

- Commune
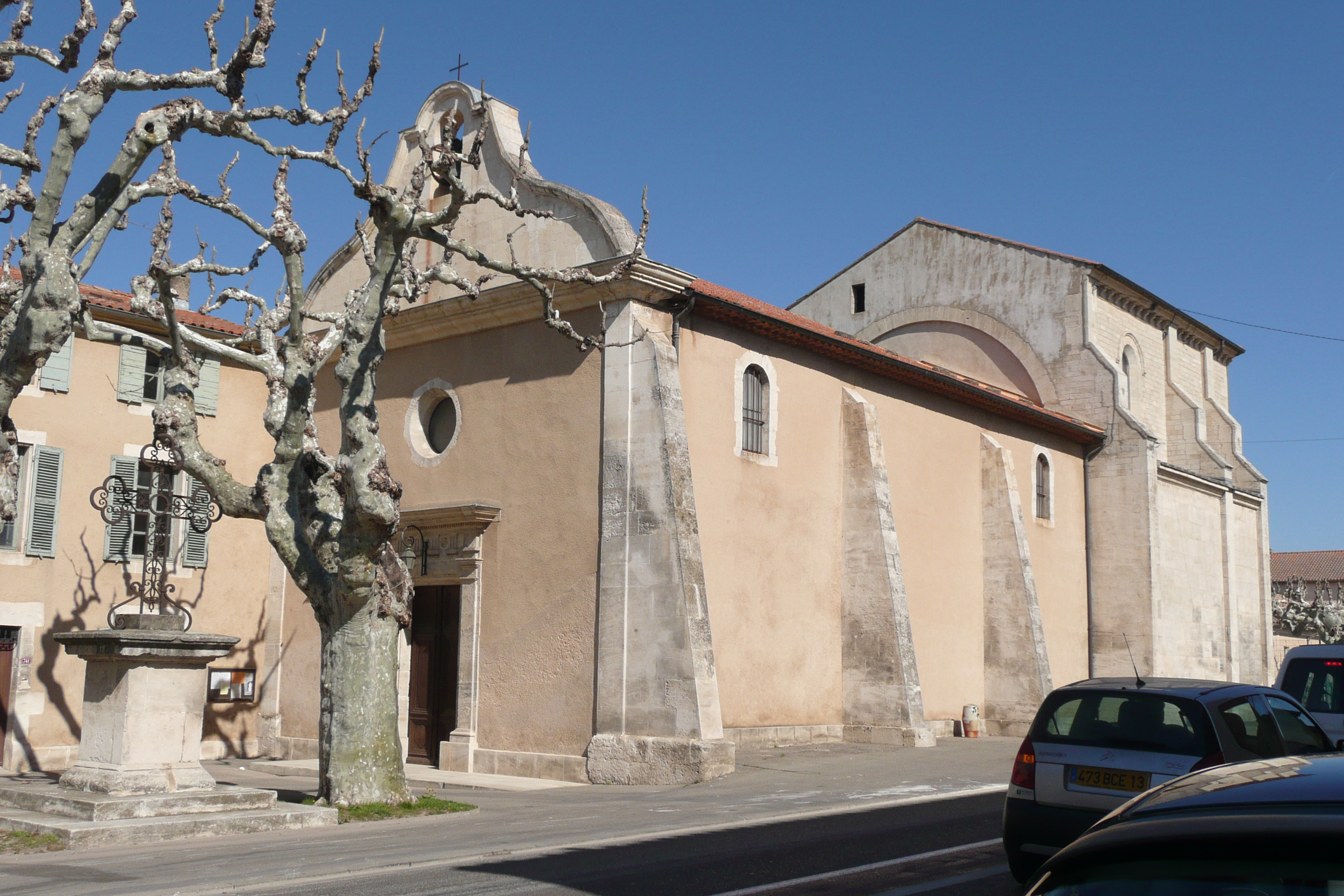
- The church of Plan d'Orgon
- Location of Plan-d'Orgon
- Location within France Location within Provence-Alpes-Côte d'Azur
- Coordinates: 43°48′42″N 5°00′07″E
- Country: France
- Region: Provence-Alpes-Côte d'Azur
- Department: Bouches-du-Rhône
- Arrondissement: Arles
- Canton: Châteaurenard
- Intercommunality: CA Terre de Provence

Government
  - Mayor (2026–32): Jérôme Guichard
- Area^{1}: 14.94 km^{2} (5.77 sq mi)
- Elevation: 69 m (226 ft)
- Highest elevation: 165 m (541 ft)
- Lowest elevation: 58 m (190 ft)
- Population (2023): 3,573
  - Density: 239.2/km^{2} (619.4/sq mi)
- Time zone: UTC+01:00 (CET)
  - Summer (DST): UTC+02:00 (CEST)
- INSEE/Postal code: 13076 /13750
- ^{1} French Land Register data, which excludes lakes, ponds, glaciers > 1 km^{2} (0.386 sq mi or 247 acres) and river estuaries.

Plan-d'Orgon (French pronunciation: [plɑ̃ dɔʁɡɔ̃]; Occitan: Lo Plan d'Orgon) is a commune in the Bouches-du-Rhône department in southern France. The commune was created in 1923 from part of Orgon.

== Population ==
Historical population

Year	Pop.	±% p.a.
1926	1,230	—
1931	1,344	+1.79%
1936	1,453	+1.57%
1946	1,422	−0.22%
1954	1,441	+0.17%
1962	1,543	+0.86%
1968	1,707	+1.70%
1975	1,745	+0.32%

Year	Pop.	±% p.a.
1982	1,885	+1.11%
1990	2,294	+2.48%
1999	2,417	+0.58%
2007	2,738	+1.57%
2012	3,067	+2.30%
2017	3,453	+2.40%
2023	3,573	+0.57%

Source: EHESS and INSEE (1968-2023)

== See also ==
- Communes of the Bouches-du-Rhône department
