= Mollégès =

Commune in Provence-Alpes-Côte d'Azur, France

- Commune
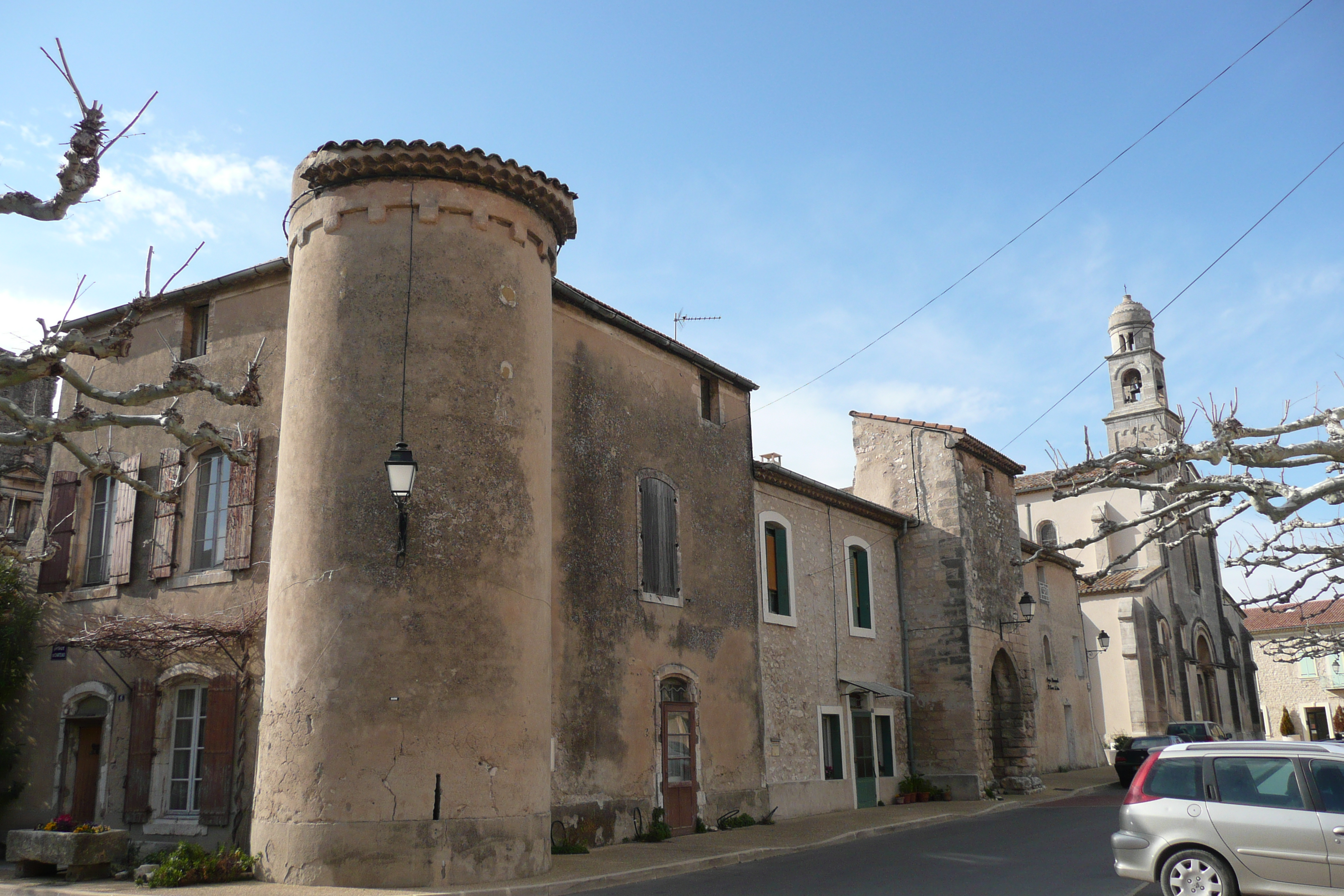
- Chateau and church

- Coat of arms
- Location of Mollégès
- Location within France Location within Provence-Alpes-Côte d'Azur
- Coordinates: 43°48′22″N 4°57′01″E
- Country: France
- Region: Provence-Alpes-Côte d'Azur
- Department: Bouches-du-Rhône
- Arrondissement: Arles
- Canton: Châteaurenard
- Intercommunality: CA Terre de Provence

Government
  - Mayor (2026–32): Corinne Chabaud
- Area^{1}: 14.20 km^{2} (5.48 sq mi)
- Elevation: 55 m (180 ft)
- Highest elevation: 67 m (220 ft)
- Lowest elevation: 45 m (148 ft)
- Population (2023): 2,647
  - Density: 186.4/km^{2} (482.8/sq mi)
- Time zone: UTC+01:00 (CET)
  - Summer (DST): UTC+02:00 (CEST)
- INSEE/Postal code: 13064 /13940
- ^{1} French Land Register data, which excludes lakes, ponds, glaciers > 1 km^{2} (0.386 sq mi or 247 acres) and river estuaries.

Mollégès (French pronunciation: [mɔleʒɛs]; Occitan: Molegés) is a commune in the Bouches-du-Rhône department in southern France.

== Population ==
Historical population

Year	Pop.	±% p.a.
1793	514	—
1800	506	−0.22%
1806	582	+2.36%
1821	648	+0.72%
1831	646	−0.03%
1836	684	+1.15%
1841	684	+0.00%
1846	700	+0.46%
1851	728	+0.79%
1856	813	+2.23%
1861	831	+0.44%
1866	820	−0.27%
1872	785	−0.72%
1876	761	−0.77%
1881	752	−0.24%
1886	795	+1.12%
1891	745	−1.29%
1896	758	+0.35%
1901	792	+0.88%

Year	Pop.	±% p.a.
1906	808	+0.40%
1911	800	−0.20%
1921	736	−0.83%
1926	770	+0.91%
1931	797	+0.69%
1936	845	+1.18%
1946	887	+0.49%
1954	1,027	+1.85%
1962	1,107	+0.94%
1968	1,132	+0.37%
1975	1,048	−1.10%
1982	1,354	+3.73%
1990	1,862	+4.06%
1999	2,171	+1.72%
2007	2,422	+1.38%
2012	2,534	+0.91%
2017	2,594	+0.47%
2023	2,647	+0.34%

Source: EHESS and INSEE (1968-2023)

== See also ==
- Communes of the Bouches-du-Rhône department
