= La Destrousse =

Commune in Provence-Alpes-Côte d'Azur, France

- Commune
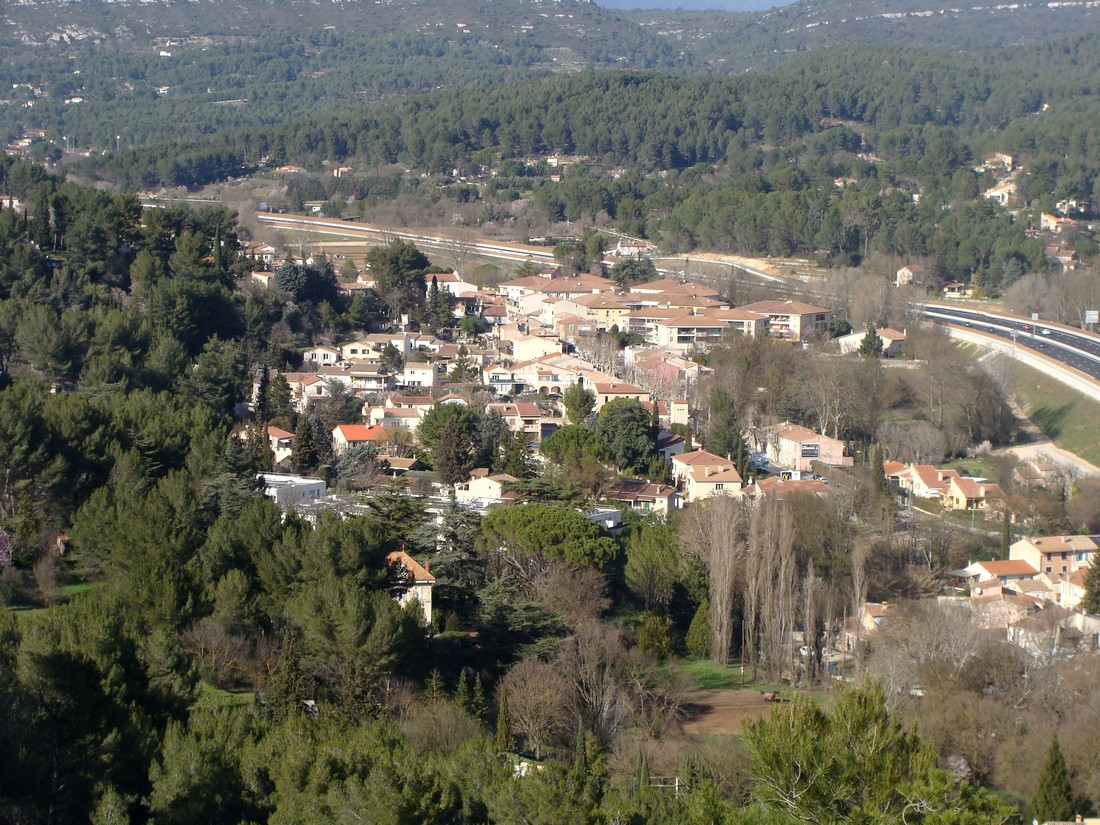

- Coat of arms
- Location of La Destrousse
- Location within France Location within Provence-Alpes-Côte d'Azur
- Coordinates: 43°22′29″N 5°36′24″E
- Country: France
- Region: Provence-Alpes-Côte d'Azur
- Department: Bouches-du-Rhône
- Arrondissement: Marseille
- Canton: Allauch
- Intercommunality: Aix-Marseille-Provence

Government
  - Mayor (2026–32): Michel Lan
- Area^{1}: 2.93 km^{2} (1.13 sq mi)
- Highest elevation: 364 m (1,194 ft)
- Lowest elevation: 177 m (581 ft)
- Population (2023): 4,133
  - Density: 1,410/km^{2} (3,650/sq mi)
- Time zone: UTC+01:00 (CET)
  - Summer (DST): UTC+02:00 (CEST)
- INSEE/Postal code: 13031 /13112
- Dialling codes: 0491
- ^{1} French Land Register data, which excludes lakes, ponds, glaciers > 1 km^{2} (0.386 sq mi or 247 acres) and river estuaries.

La Destrousse (French pronunciation: [la dɛstʁus]; Occitan: La Destroça) is a commune in the department of Bouches-du-Rhône in the Provence-Alpes-Côte d'Azur region in southern France. The commune was created in 1870 from part of Peypin.

== Population ==
Historical population

Year	Pop.	±% p.a.
1872	690	—
1876	593	−3.72%
1881	572	−0.72%
1886	578	+0.21%
1891	629	+1.71%
1896	550	−2.65%
1901	581	+1.10%
1906	644	+2.08%
1911	712	+2.03%
1921	703	−0.13%
1926	702	−0.03%
1931	771	+1.89%
1936	700	−1.91%

Year	Pop.	±% p.a.
1946	769	+0.94%
1954	688	−1.38%
1962	748	+1.05%
1968	854	+2.23%
1975	1,205	+5.04%
1982	1,755	+5.52%
1990	2,270	+3.27%
1999	2,489	+1.03%
2007	2,736	+1.19%
2012	3,074	+2.36%
2017	3,503	+2.65%
2023	4,133	+2.79%

Source: EHESS and INSEE (1968-2023)

== See also ==
- Communes of the Bouches-du-Rhône department
