= Eyragues =

Commune in Provence-Alpes-Côte d'Azur, France

- Commune
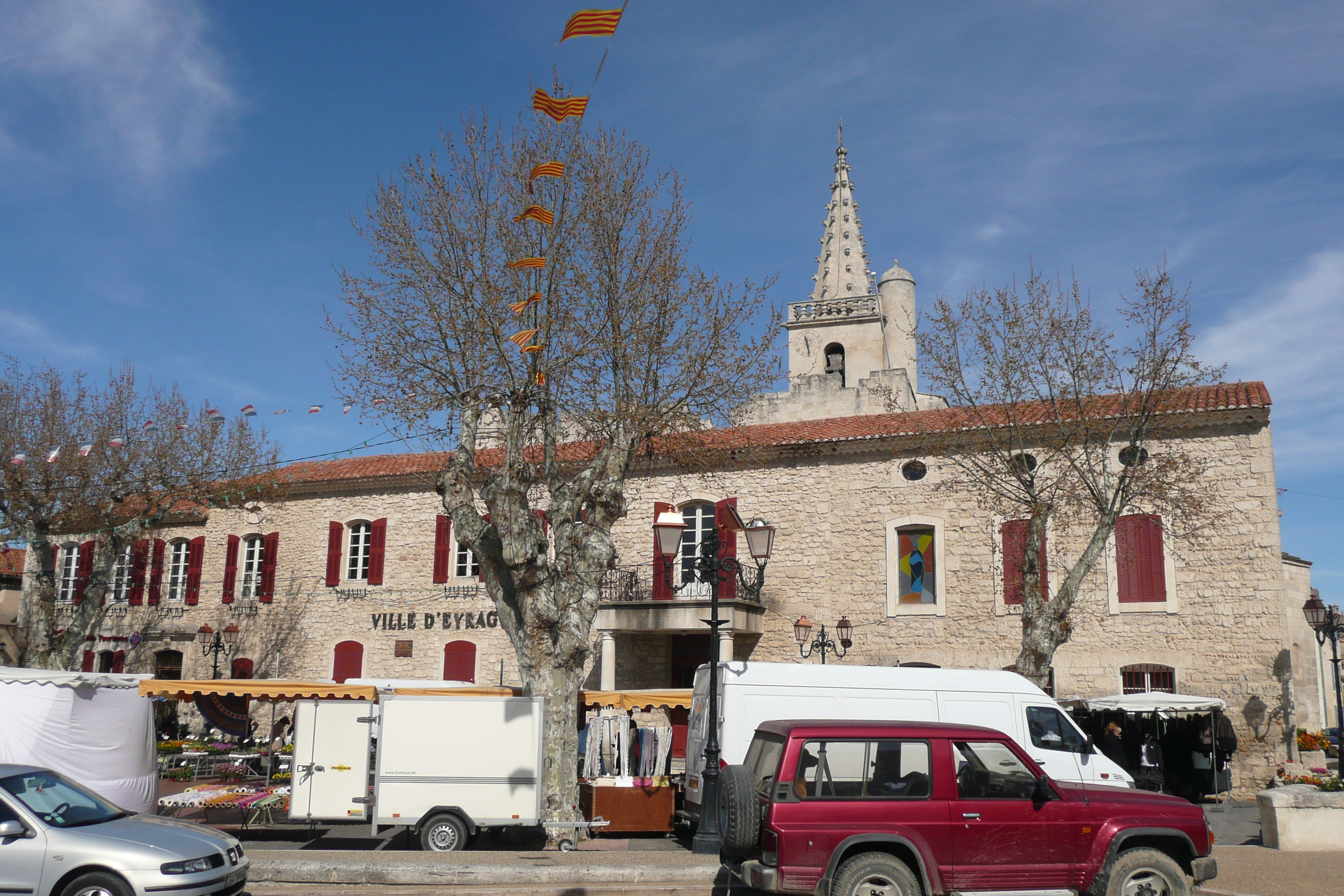
- The marketplace in Eyragues

- Coat of arms
- Location of Eyragues
- Location within France Location within Provence-Alpes-Côte d'Azur
- Coordinates: 43°50′31″N 4°50′30″E
- Country: France
- Region: Provence-Alpes-Côte d'Azur
- Department: Bouches-du-Rhône
- Arrondissement: Arles
- Canton: Châteaurenard
- Intercommunality: CA Terre de Provence

Government
  - Mayor (2026–32): Michel Gavanon
- Area^{1}: 20.78 km^{2} (8.02 sq mi)
- Elevation: 23 m (75 ft)
- Highest elevation: 99 m (325 ft)
- Lowest elevation: 11 m (36 ft)
- Population (2023): 4,298
  - Density: 206.8/km^{2} (535.7/sq mi)
- Time zone: UTC+01:00 (CET)
  - Summer (DST): UTC+02:00 (CEST)
- INSEE/Postal code: 13036 /13630
- ^{1} French Land Register data, which excludes lakes, ponds, glaciers > 1 km^{2} (0.386 sq mi or 247 acres) and river estuaries.

Eyragues (French pronunciation: [ɛʁaɡ]; Occitan: Airaga en Provença) is a commune in the Bouches-du-Rhône department in southern France. Located 14 km (8.7 mi) south of Avignon, and 6 km (3.7 mi) north of Saint-Rémy-de-Provence, it has a weekly market on Fridays in the large village square.

== Population ==
Historical population

Year	Pop.	±% p.a.
1793	2,389	—
1800	2,388	−0.01%
1806	2,060	−2.43%
1821	2,206	+0.46%
1831	2,227	+0.09%
1836	2,272	+0.40%
1841	2,290	+0.16%
1846	2,319	+0.25%
1851	2,368	+0.42%
1856	2,527	+1.31%
1861	2,554	+0.21%
1866	2,583	+0.23%
1872	2,461	−0.80%
1876	2,361	−1.03%
1881	2,191	−1.48%
1886	2,069	−1.14%
1891	2,008	−0.60%
1896	1,946	−0.63%
1901	1,957	+0.11%

Year	Pop.	±% p.a.
1906	1,937	−0.21%
1911	1,935	−0.02%
1921	1,575	−2.04%
1926	1,745	+2.07%
1931	1,767	+0.25%
1936	1,878	+1.23%
1946	1,864	−0.07%
1954	2,015	+0.98%
1962	2,092	+0.47%
1968	2,288	+1.50%
1975	2,512	+1.34%
1982	2,968	+2.41%
1990	3,504	+2.10%
1999	3,941	+1.31%
2007	4,258	+0.97%
2012	4,178	−0.38%
2017	4,468	+1.35%
2023	4,298	−0.64%

Source: EHESS and INSEE (1968-2023)

== See also ==
- Communes of the Bouches-du-Rhône department
