= Saint-Martin-de-Crau =

Commune in Provence-Alpes-Côte d'Azur, France

- Commune
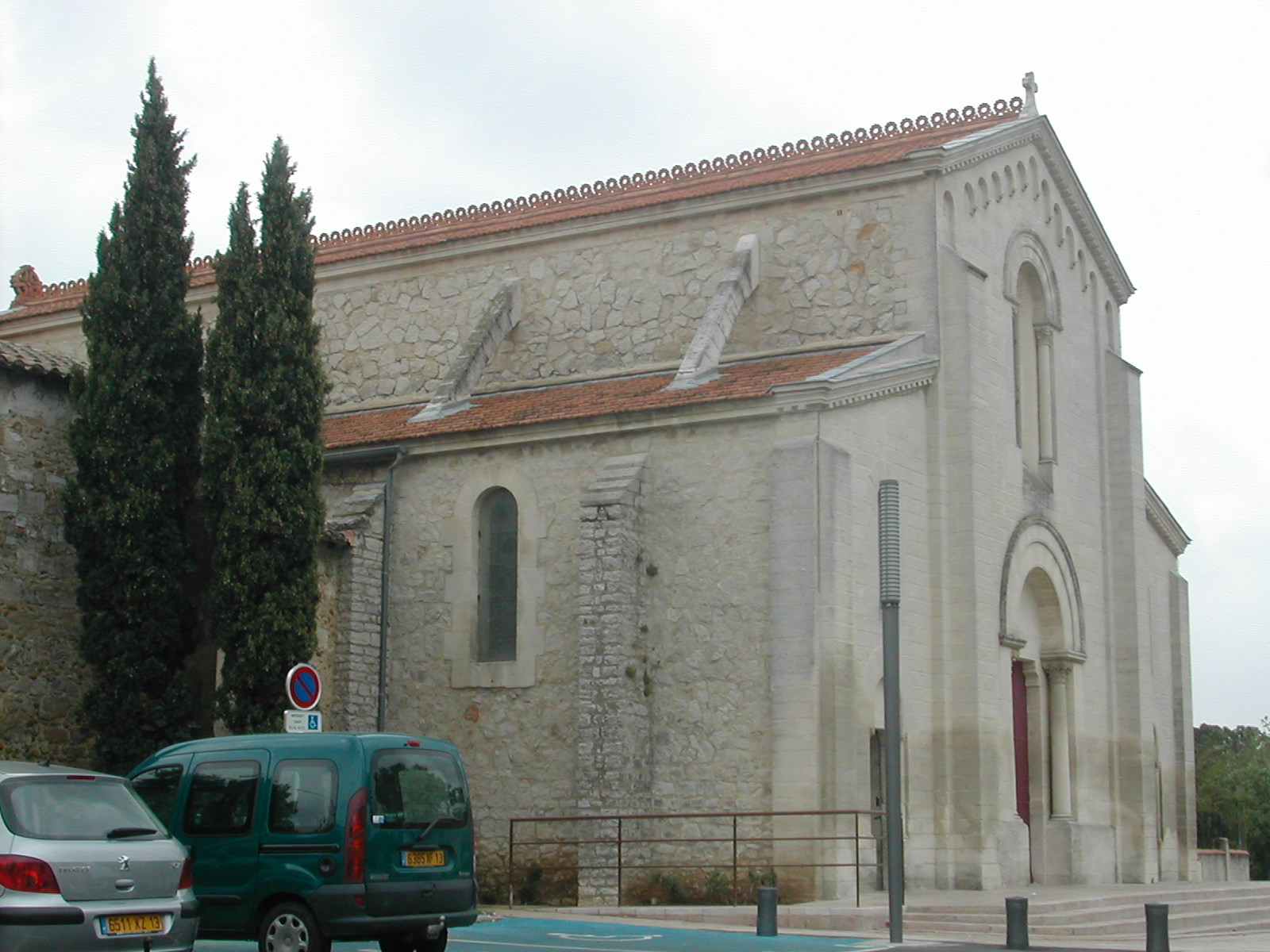
- The church in Saint-Martin-de-Crau

- Coat of arms
- Location of Saint-Martin-de-Crau
- Location within France Location within Provence-Alpes-Côte d'Azur
- Coordinates: 43°38′27″N 4°48′48″E
- Country: France
- Region: Provence-Alpes-Côte d'Azur
- Department: Bouches-du-Rhône
- Arrondissement: Arles
- Canton: Salon-de-Provence-2
- Intercommunality: CA Arles-Crau-Camargue-Montagnette

Government
  - Mayor (2026–32): Séverine Dellanegra
- Area^{1}: 214.87 km^{2} (82.96 sq mi)
- Elevation: 24 m (79 ft)
- Highest elevation: 447 m (1,467 ft)
- Lowest elevation: 2 m (6.6 ft)
- Population (2023): 14,145
  - Density: 65.831/km^{2} (170.50/sq mi)
- Demonym: Saint-Martinois
- Time zone: UTC+01:00 (CET)
  - Summer (DST): UTC+02:00 (CEST)
- INSEE/Postal code: 13097 /13310
- ^{1} French Land Register data, which excludes lakes, ponds, glaciers > 1 km^{2} (0.386 sq mi or 247 acres) and river estuaries.

Saint-Martin-de-Crau (French pronunciation: [sɛ̃ maʁtɛ̃ də kʁo]; Provençal: Sant Martin de Crau) is a commune in the Bouches-du-Rhône department in southern France. Inhabitants are called Saint-Martinois.

== Population ==
Saint-Martin-de-Crau has the lowest population density of all communes in metropolitan France that have a population exceeding 12,000 inhabitants. With a land area of 214.87 km^{2} (82.962 sq mi), it is the fifth-largest commune in geographic area in metropolitan France (after Arles, Saintes-Maries-de-la-Mer, Laruns, and Marseille).

Historical population

Year	Pop.	±% p.a.
1926	2,303	—
1931	2,487	+1.55%
1936	2,361	−1.03%
1946	2,487	+0.52%
1954	2,824	+1.60%
1962	3,075	+1.07%
1968	3,257	+0.96%
1975	5,551	+7.91%

Year	Pop.	±% p.a.
1982	10,155	+9.01%
1990	11,040	+1.05%
1999	11,013	−0.03%
2007	11,215	+0.23%
2012	12,072	+1.48%
2017	13,389	+2.09%
2023	14,145	+0.92%

Source: EHESS and INSEE (1968-2023)

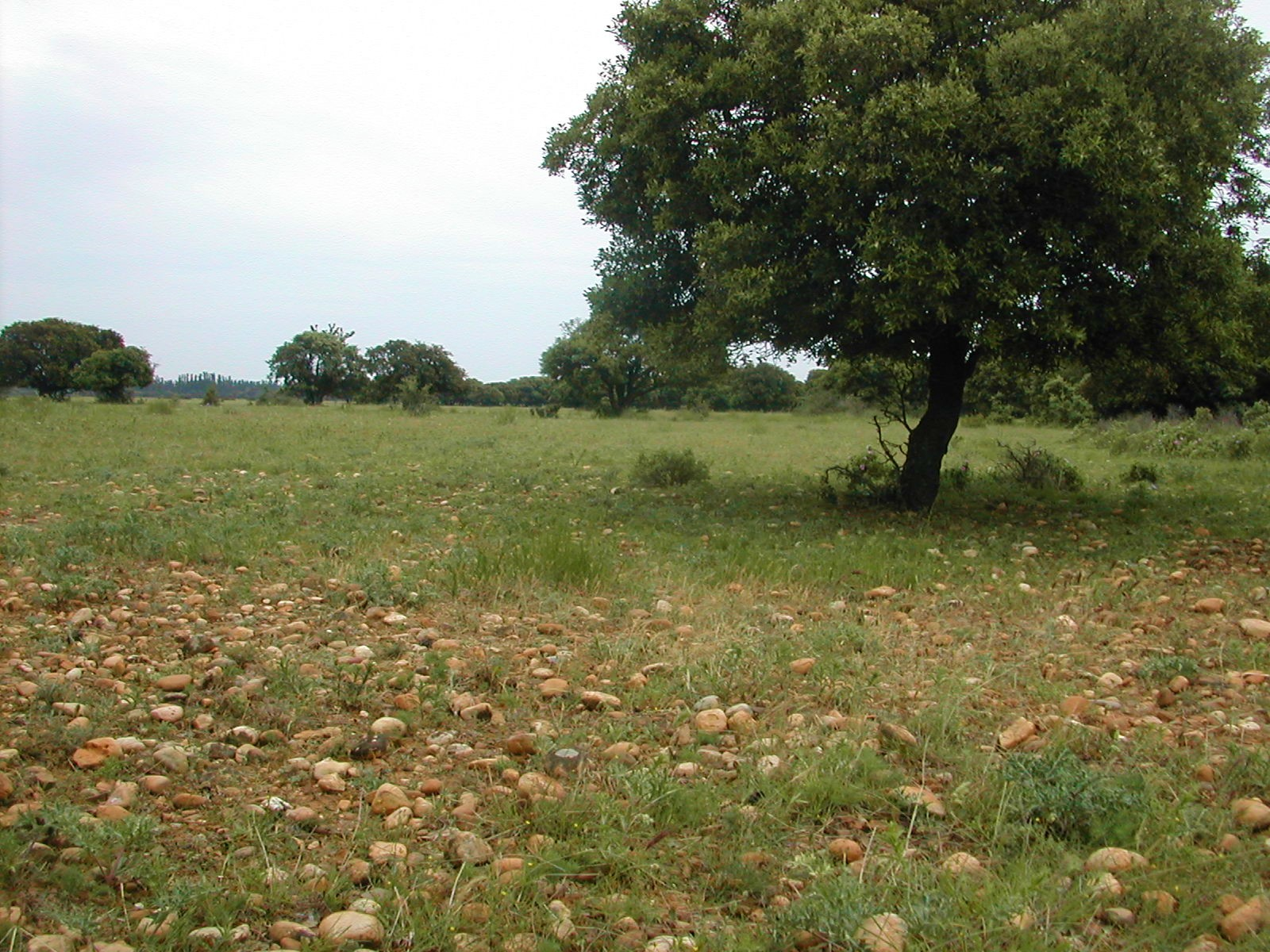
Crau in Saint Martin de Crau

== Twin towns ==
Saint-Martin-de-Crau is twinned with:

- Markgröningen, Germany

== See also ==
- Alpilles
- Communes of the Bouches-du-Rhône department
