= Rognonas =

Commune in Provence-Alpes-Côte d'Azur, France

- Commune
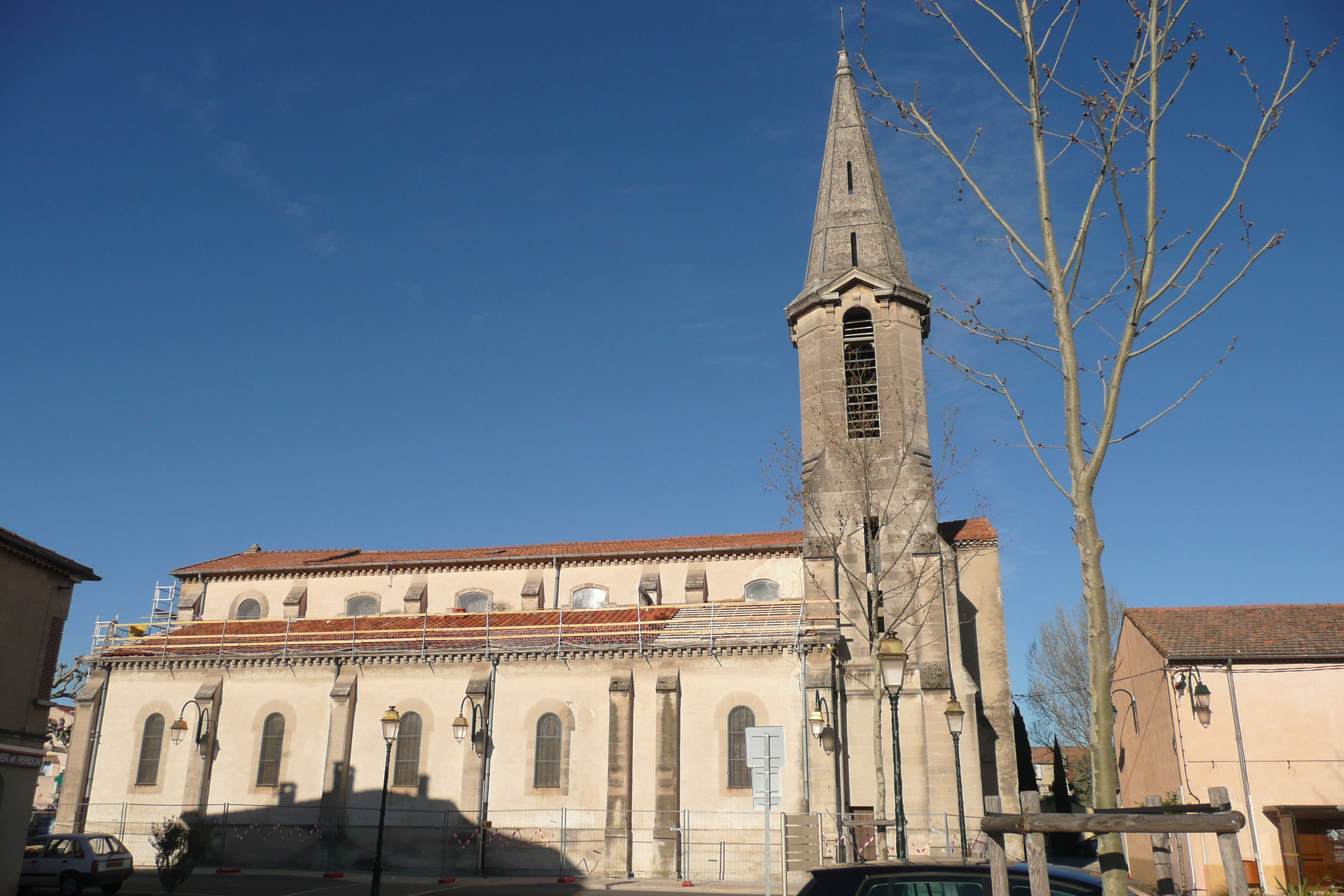
- The church of Rognonas

- Coat of arms
- Location of Rognonas
- Location within France Location within Provence-Alpes-Côte d'Azur
- Coordinates: 43°54′06″N 4°48′19″E
- Country: France
- Region: Provence-Alpes-Côte d'Azur
- Department: Bouches-du-Rhône
- Arrondissement: Arles
- Canton: Châteaurenard
- Intercommunality: CA Terre de Provence

Government
  - Mayor (2026–32): Yves Picarda
- Area^{1}: 9.41 km^{2} (3.63 sq mi)
- Elevation: 20 m (66 ft)
- Highest elevation: 25 m (82 ft)
- Lowest elevation: 16 m (52 ft)
- Population (2023): 4,261
  - Density: 453/km^{2} (1,170/sq mi)
- Time zone: UTC+01:00 (CET)
  - Summer (DST): UTC+02:00 (CEST)
- INSEE/Postal code: 13083 /13870
- ^{1} French Land Register data, which excludes lakes, ponds, glaciers > 1 km^{2} (0.386 sq mi or 247 acres) and river estuaries.

Rognonas (French pronunciation: [ʁɔɲɔna]; Occitan: Ronhonàs) is a commune in the Bouches-du-Rhône department in southern France.

== Population ==
Historical population

Year	Pop.	±% p.a.
1793	573	—
1800	589	+0.39%
1806	666	+2.07%
1821	682	+0.16%
1831	979	+3.68%
1836	1,010	+0.63%
1841	1,055	+0.88%
1846	1,199	+2.59%
1851	1,043	−2.75%
1856	1,153	+2.03%
1861	1,230	+1.30%
1866	1,273	+0.69%
1872	1,320	+0.61%
1876	1,382	+1.15%
1881	1,381	−0.01%
1886	1,385	+0.06%
1891	1,323	−0.91%
1896	1,330	+0.11%
1901	1,441	+1.62%

Year	Pop.	±% p.a.
1906	1,608	+2.22%
1911	1,629	+0.26%
1921	1,645	+0.10%
1926	1,703	+0.70%
1931	1,791	+1.01%
1936	1,841	+0.55%
1946	1,787	−0.30%
1954	1,905	+0.80%
1962	1,927	+0.14%
1968	2,247	+2.59%
1975	2,680	+2.55%
1982	3,156	+2.36%
1990	3,358	+0.78%
1999	3,578	+0.71%
2007	4,025	+1.48%
2012	4,024	−0.00%
2017	4,101	+0.38%
2023	4,261	+0.64%

Source: EHESS and INSEE (1968-2023)

== See also ==
- Communes of the Bouches-du-Rhône department
- Pont de Rognonas
