= Cabannes, Bouches-du-Rhône =

Commune in Provence-Alpes-Côte d'Azur, France

Cabannes
- Commune
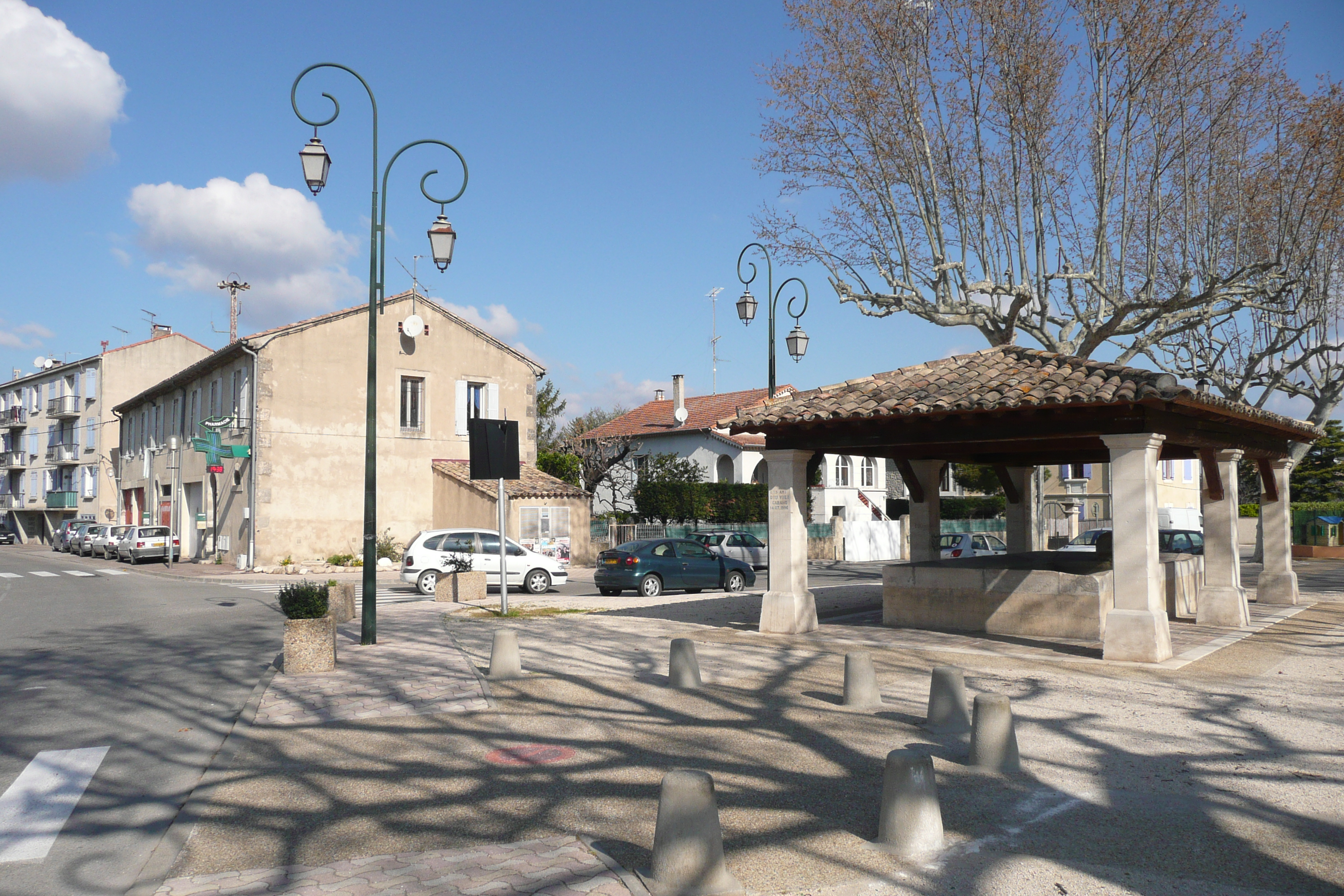
- Wash house

- Coat of arms
- Location of Cabannes
- Location within France Location within Provence-Alpes-Côte d'Azur
- Coordinates: 43°51′41″N 4°57′06″E
- Country: France
- Region: Provence-Alpes-Côte d'Azur
- Department: Bouches-du-Rhône
- Arrondissement: Arles
- Canton: Châteaurenard
- Intercommunality: CA Terre de Provence

Government
  - Mayor (2026–32): Gilles Mourgues
- Area^{1}: 20.91 km^{2} (8.07 sq mi)
- Elevation: 50 m (160 ft)
- Highest elevation: 65 m (213 ft)
- Lowest elevation: 42 m (138 ft)
- Population (2023): 4,595
  - Density: 219.8/km^{2} (569.2/sq mi)
- Time zone: UTC+01:00 (CET)
  - Summer (DST): UTC+02:00 (CEST)
- INSEE/Postal code: 13018 /13440
- ^{1} French Land Register data, which excludes lakes, ponds, glaciers > 1 km^{2} (0.386 sq mi or 247 acres) and river estuaries.

Cabannes (French pronunciation: [kaban]; Occitan: Cabanas) is a commune in the Bouches-du-Rhône department in southern France.

== Heraldry ==
Cabannes	Azure, a hunting horn Or surmounted by three billets of the same arranged in chief.

== Population ==
Historical population
Year	Pop.	±% p.a.
1968	2,698	—
1975	2,767	+0.36%
1982	2,982	+1.07%
1990	3,929	+3.51%
1999	4,119	+0.53%
2007	4,291	+0.51%
2012	4,357	+0.31%
2017	4,441	+0.38%
2023	4,595	+0.57%
Source: INSEE

== See also ==
- Communes of the Bouches-du-Rhône department
