= Gréasque =

Commune in Provence-Alpes-Côte d'Azur, France

- Commune
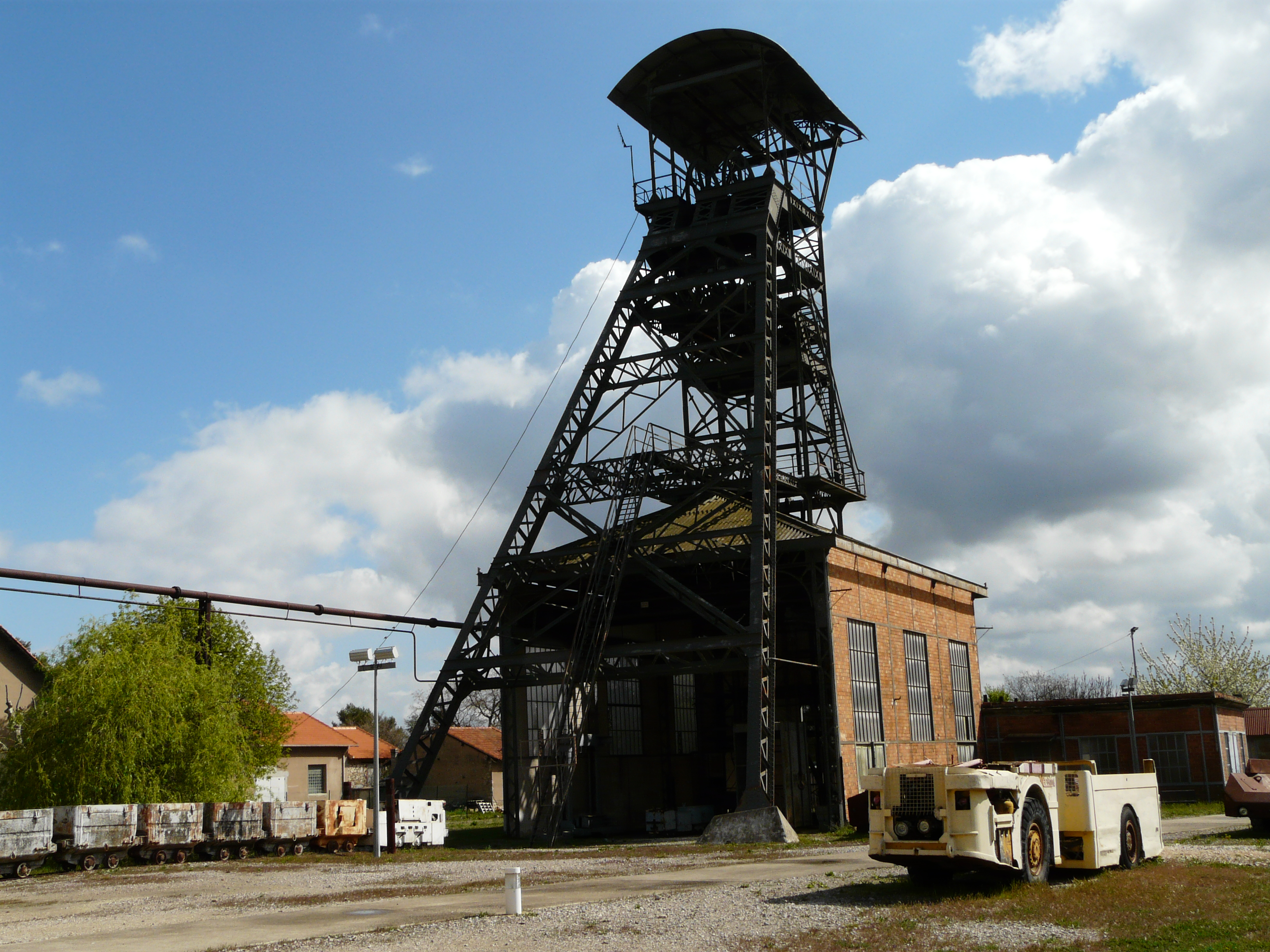
- Headframe of the Hély d'Oissel coal mine, registered as an historic monument in 1989

- Coat of arms
- Location of Gréasque
- Location within France Location within Provence-Alpes-Côte d'Azur
- Coordinates: 43°25′50″N 5°32′21″E
- Country: France
- Region: Provence-Alpes-Côte d'Azur
- Department: Bouches-du-Rhône
- Arrondissement: Aix-en-Provence
- Canton: Allauch
- Intercommunality: Aix-Marseille-Provence

Government
  - Mayor (2026–32): Hélène Gaillard
- Area^{1}: 6.15 km^{2} (2.37 sq mi)
- Highest elevation: 385 m (1,263 ft)
- Lowest elevation: 276 m (906 ft)
- Population (2023): 4,554
  - Density: 740/km^{2} (1,920/sq mi)
- Time zone: UTC+01:00 (CET)
  - Summer (DST): UTC+02:00 (CEST)
- INSEE/Postal code: 13046 /13850
- Dialling codes: 0442
- ^{1} French Land Register data, which excludes lakes, ponds, glaciers > 1 km^{2} (0.386 sq mi or 247 acres) and river estuaries.

Gréasque (French pronunciation: [gʁeask]; Occitan: Griasca) is a commune northeast of Marseille in the department of Bouches-du-Rhône in the Provence-Alpes-Côte d'Azur region in southern France. It was traditionally a mining town.

== Population ==
The inhabitants are called Gréasquéens.

Historical population

Year	Pop.	±% p.a.
1793	202	—
1800	209	+0.49%
1806	240	+2.33%
1821	259	+0.51%
1831	310	+1.81%
1836	298	−0.79%
1841	371	+4.48%
1846	402	+1.62%
1851	466	+3.00%
1856	485	+0.80%
1861	557	+2.81%
1866	685	+4.22%
1872	802	+2.66%
1876	854	+1.58%
1881	903	+1.12%
1886	831	−1.65%
1891	821	−0.24%
1896	775	−1.15%
1901	815	+1.01%

Year	Pop.	±% p.a.
1906	792	−0.57%
1911	849	+1.40%
1921	1,172	+3.28%
1926	1,806	+9.03%
1931	1,898	+1.00%
1936	1,671	−2.52%
1946	1,742	+0.42%
1954	2,053	+2.07%
1962	2,073	+0.12%
1968	2,309	+1.81%
1975	2,439	+0.79%
1982	2,674	+1.32%
1990	3,081	+1.79%
1999	3,576	+1.67%
2007	3,878	+1.02%
2012	4,086	+1.05%
2017	4,235	+0.72%
2023	4,554	+1.22%

Source: EHESS and INSEE (1968-2023)

== See also ==
- Communes of the Bouches-du-Rhône department
