= Saint-Savournin =

Commune in Provence-Alpes-Côte d'Azur, France

- Commune
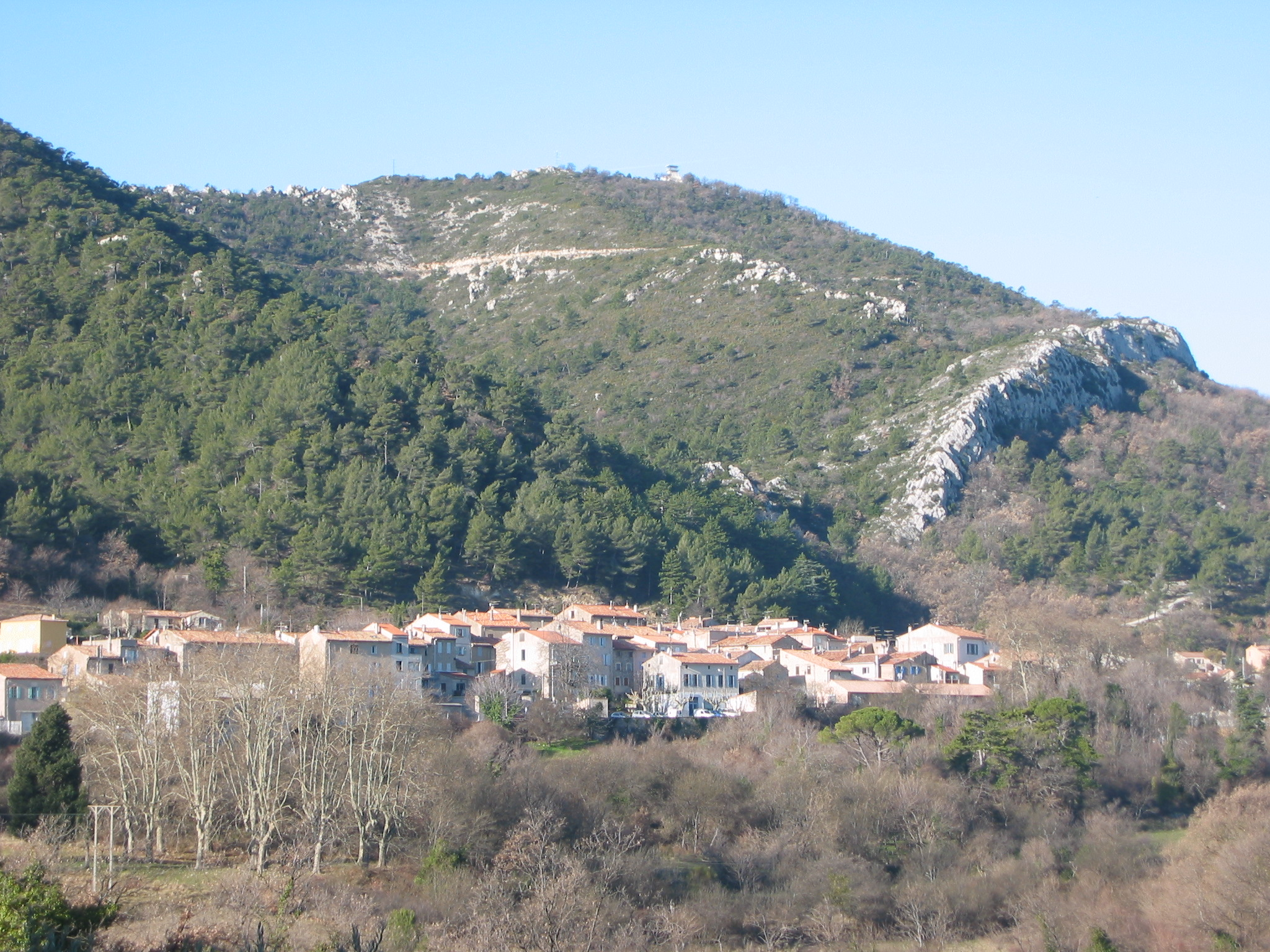
- The village of Saint-Savournin in 2005

- Coat of arms
- Location of Saint-Savournin
- Location within France Location within Provence-Alpes-Côte d'Azur
- Coordinates: 43°24′22″N 5°31′41″E
- Country: France
- Region: Provence-Alpes-Côte d'Azur
- Department: Bouches-du-Rhône
- Arrondissement: Marseille
- Canton: Allauch
- Intercommunality: Aix-Marseille-Provence

Government
  - Mayor (2026–32): Lionel Lenel
- Area^{1}: 5.89 km^{2} (2.27 sq mi)
- Elevation: 450 m (1,480 ft)
- Highest elevation: 778 m (2,552 ft)
- Lowest elevation: 307 m (1,007 ft)
- Population (2023): 3,397
  - Density: 577/km^{2} (1,490/sq mi)
- Time zone: UTC+01:00 (CET)
  - Summer (DST): UTC+02:00 (CEST)
- INSEE/Postal code: 13101 /13119
- Dialling codes: 0491
- ^{1} French Land Register data, which excludes lakes, ponds, glaciers > 1 km^{2} (0.386 sq mi or 247 acres) and river estuaries.

Saint-Savournin (French pronunciation: [sɛ̃ savuʁnɛ̃]; Occitan: Sant Savornin) is a commune east of Marseille at the eastern extremity of the Massif de l'Étoile between Cadolive and Mimet in the Bouches-du-Rhône department in the Provence-Alpes-Côte d'Azur region in southern France.

== History ==
Signs of Neolithic settlement have been found and extensive evidence of human habitation during the Gallo-Roman centuries has been identified.

Medieval Saint-Savournin was a village that made its living from the land, rearing sheep and goats and cultivating olives.

== Name ==
The commune's name originated from the first church in the area, seen in writings donated to the Abbey of Saint-Victor in 1010. The church was known as Sanctus Saturninus at the time and was most likely built on the ruins of a temple dedicated to Saturn. In the 16th century, Saint-Saturnin became Saint-Savournin following the ordinance of Villers-Cotterêts in 1539 which prescribed the writing in French of all official acts.

== Population ==
Historical population

Year	Pop.	±% p.a.
1793	369	—
1800	429	+2.18%
1806	513	+3.03%
1821	612	+1.18%
1831	735	+1.85%
1836	759	+0.64%
1841	797	+0.98%
1846	813	+0.40%
1851	904	+2.14%
1856	1,006	+2.16%
1861	1,111	+2.01%
1866	1,266	+2.65%
1872	1,392	+1.59%
1876	1,553	+2.77%
1881	1,775	+2.71%
1886	1,753	−0.25%
1891	1,931	+1.95%
1896	1,820	−1.18%
1901	987	−11.52%

Year	Pop.	±% p.a.
1906	997	+0.20%
1911	984	−0.26%
1921	1,092	+1.05%
1926	1,211	+2.09%
1931	1,225	+0.23%
1936	1,110	−1.95%
1946	1,168	+0.51%
1954	1,199	+0.33%
1962	1,184	−0.16%
1968	1,120	−0.92%
1975	1,140	+0.25%
1982	1,589	+4.86%
1990	2,093	+3.50%
1999	2,558	+2.25%
2007	3,035	+2.16%
2012	3,240	+1.32%
2017	3,361	+0.74%
2023	3,397	+0.18%

Source: EHESS and INSEE (1968-2023)

In the 19th century, Italian immigration encouraged the growth of the population, particularly in La Valentine, thanks to the industrial activity around the mines. Most of the Italians came from the village of Moiola in Piedmont. A friendship pact was signed between the two villages on April 29, 1979.

== See also ==
- Communes of the Bouches-du-Rhône department
