= Pont de Rognonas =

- Pont de Rognonas in 2022
- Coordinates: 43.915085°N 4.808516°E
- Carries: D 570N
- Crosses: Durance
- Locale: Rognonas, Avignon

Characteristics
- Design: Suspension bridge
- Material: Steel
- Pier construction: Reinforced concrete
- Total length: 415 m (1,362 ft)
- Longest span: 255 m (837 ft)
- No. of spans: 3
- No. of lanes: 2

History
- Constructed by: Boussiron
- Construction start: 8 August 1946
- Construction end: 1950

Location
- Interactive map of Pont de Rognonas

Pont de Rognonas in 2022. Warren trusses are clearly visible along the sides of the spans

Pont de Rognonas is a 415-meter-long steel suspension road bridge. It crosses the Durance to connect Rognonas in the Bouches-du-Rhône department with Avignon in the Vaucluse department of southern France.

It was reported in 2026 that the bridge was crossed by 26,500 vehicles daily.

== History ==
An earlier bridge at Rognonas was approved by royal ordinance in December 1832 and opened to traffic on 29 July 1834. On 31 May 1835, following an exceptional rise of the Durance that flooded the Rognonas plain, local farmers threatened to breach an embankment associated with the recently opened bridge. A company of the 34th Line Infantry Regiment and several gendarmerie brigades were sent to the area, and their presence was sufficient to restore order. The bridge was damaged by flooding in 1840 and partially destroyed by further flooding in November 1843, before reopening in September 1844.

During World War II, the bridge became a target of Allied bombing and was hit during an air raid on 16 August 1944. It was subsequently repaired and reopened to traffic, but its age and condition led to its replacement.

Construction of the current bridge began on 8 August 1946, with the work undertaken by the Paris-based Boussiron company. The bridge was completed in 1950.

== Design ==
A contemporary description of the project specified three spans, comprising a central span of 254.5 m and two side spans of 80 m, for a total length of 414.5 m. The planned width was 10 m, including a 7 m roadway and two 1.5 m sidewalks.

The suspended deck is stiffened by a pair of double Warren trusses running along the sides of the spans. They are spaced 10.76 m (35.3 ft) center to center and are 4.20 m (13.8 ft) high. The stiffening trusses of the central span and the two side spans are structurally independent.

== Traffic restrictions ==
In October 2025, the Bouches-du-Rhône department restricted vehicles weighing more than 26 tonnes from using the bridge. The department said that Cerema, a French public agency providing technical expertise on infrastructure and transport, had recommended that the bridge not be exposed to an increase in heavy-vehicle traffic pending further studies. A detailed inspection and a complete recalculation of the admissible loads were planned for 2026. The restriction became part of a wider debate over the management of heavy-goods traffic around Avignon, including disputes over its implementation and the absence of a designated diversion route.
