= Châteaurenard =

Commune in Provence-Alpes-Côte d'Azur, France

Châteaurenard Castèurainard (Occitan)
- Commune
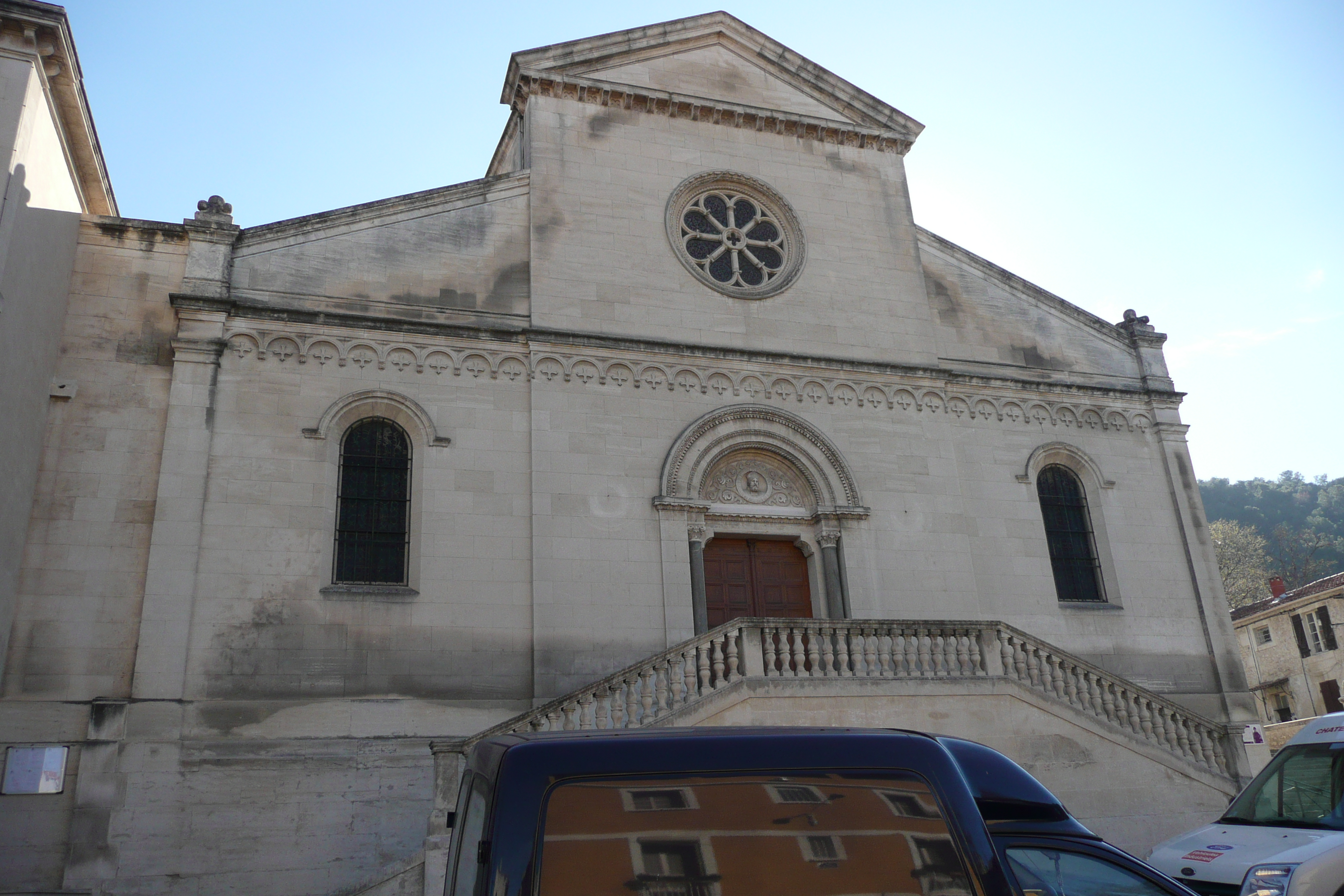
- The church of Châteaurenard

- Coat of arms
- Location of Châteaurenard
- Location within France Location within Provence-Alpes-Côte d'Azur
- Coordinates: 43°53′00″N 4°51′19″E
- Country: France
- Region: Provence-Alpes-Côte d'Azur
- Department: Bouches-du-Rhône
- Arrondissement: Arles
- Canton: Châteaurenard
- Intercommunality: CA Terre de Provence

Government
  - Mayor (2026–32): Marcel Martel
- Area^{1}: 34.95 km^{2} (13.49 sq mi)
- Highest elevation: 110 m (360 ft)
- Lowest elevation: 15 m (49 ft)
- Population (2023): 16,545
  - Density: 473.4/km^{2} (1,226/sq mi)
- Time zone: UTC+01:00 (CET)
  - Summer (DST): UTC+02:00 (CEST)
- INSEE/Postal code: 13027 /13160
- ^{1} French Land Register data, which excludes lakes, ponds, glaciers > 1 km^{2} (0.386 sq mi or 247 acres) and river estuaries.

Châteaurenard (French: [ʃɑtoʁənaʁ]; Provençal Occitan: Castèurainard; Occitan: [kastɛwʀajnaʀt]) is a commune in the Arles arrondissement, in the Bouches-du-Rhône department, in the Provence-Alpes-Côte d'Azur region, in southern France.

== Population ==
Historical population

Year	Pop.	±% p.a.
1793	2,958	—
1800	3,154	+0.92%
1806	3,395	+1.23%
1821	3,816	+0.78%
1831	4,151	+0.85%
1836	4,376	+1.06%
1841	4,744	+1.63%
1846	5,107	+1.49%
1851	5,358	+0.96%
1856	5,511	+0.56%
1861	5,532	+0.08%
1866	5,409	−0.45%
1872	5,708	+0.90%
1876	5,554	−0.68%
1881	5,801	+0.87%
1886	5,934	+0.45%
1891	5,960	+0.09%
1896	6,194	+0.77%
1901	7,398	+3.62%

Year	Pop.	±% p.a.
1906	8,036	+1.67%
1911	8,638	+1.46%
1921	8,016	−0.74%
1926	8,646	+1.52%
1931	8,872	+0.52%
1936	8,695	−0.40%
1946	8,604	−0.11%
1954	9,063	+0.65%
1962	9,602	+0.72%
1968	10,220	+1.05%
1975	11,027	+1.09%
1982	11,072	+0.06%
1990	11,790	+0.79%
1999	13,070	+1.15%
2007	14,495	+1.30%
2012	15,934	+1.91%
2017	15,814	−0.15%
2023	16,545	+0.76%

Source: EHESS and INSEE (1968-2023)

== Twin towns ==
Châteaurenard is twinned with:

- Altenholz, Germany
- Villanova d'Asti, Italy

== See also ==
- Communes of the Bouches-du-Rhône department
