= Noves =

Commune in Provence-Alpes-Côte d'Azur, France

- Commune
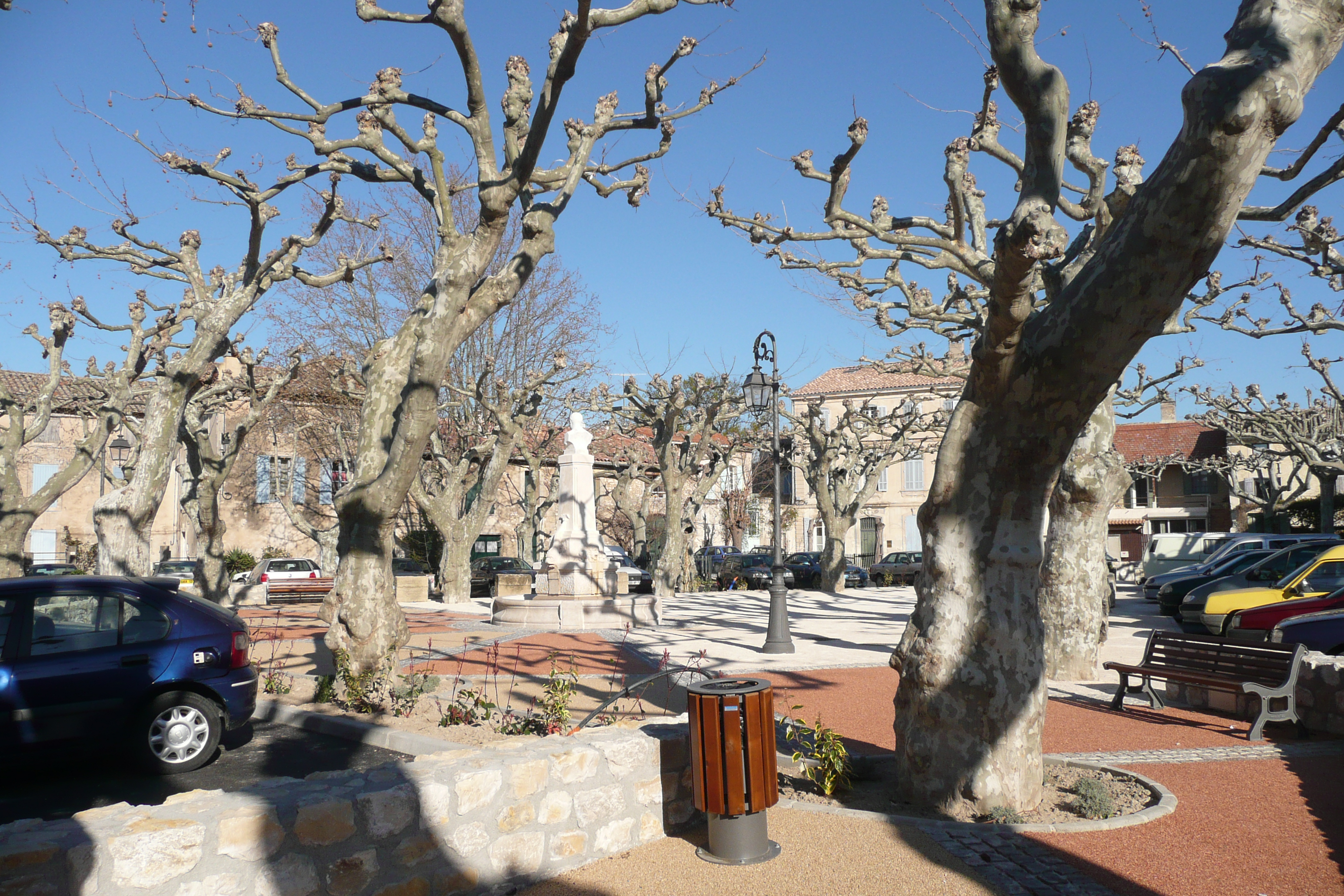
- The main square in Noves

- Coat of arms
- Location of Noves
- Location within France Location within Provence-Alpes-Côte d'Azur
- Coordinates: 43°52′12″N 4°54′07″E
- Country: France
- Region: Provence-Alpes-Côte d'Azur
- Department: Bouches-du-Rhône
- Arrondissement: Arles
- Canton: Châteaurenard
- Intercommunality: CA Terre de Provence

Government
  - Mayor (2026–32): Laurent Fabre
- Area^{1}: 27.92 km^{2} (10.78 sq mi)
- Elevation: 43 m (141 ft)
- Highest elevation: 105 m (344 ft)
- Lowest elevation: 32 m (105 ft)
- Population (2023): 6,080
  - Density: 218/km^{2} (564/sq mi)
- Time zone: UTC+01:00 (CET)
  - Summer (DST): UTC+02:00 (CEST)
- INSEE/Postal code: 13066 /13550
- ^{1} French Land Register data, which excludes lakes, ponds, glaciers > 1 km^{2} (0.386 sq mi or 247 acres) and river estuaries.

Noves (French pronunciation: [nɔv]; Occitan: Nòvas) is a commune in the Bouches-du-Rhône department in southern France.

== Population ==
Historical population

Year	Pop.	±% p.a.
1793	1,200	—
1800	1,490	+3.14%
1806	1,262	−2.73%
1821	1,772	+2.29%
1831	1,908	+0.74%
1836	1,877	−0.33%
1841	1,927	+0.53%
1846	2,051	+1.26%
1851	2,161	+1.05%
1856	2,174	+0.12%
1861	2,130	−0.41%
1866	2,187	+0.53%
1872	2,200	+0.10%
1876	2,018	−2.14%
1881	2,064	+0.45%
1886	2,038	−0.25%
1891	2,111	+0.71%
1896	2,173	+0.58%
1901	2,260	+0.79%

Year	Pop.	±% p.a.
1906	2,408	+1.28%
1911	2,494	+0.70%
1921	2,475	−0.08%
1926	2,642	+1.31%
1931	2,823	+1.33%
1936	2,929	+0.74%
1946	2,840	−0.31%
1954	2,984	+0.62%
1962	3,267	+1.14%
1968	3,579	+1.53%
1975	3,593	+0.06%
1982	3,693	+0.39%
1990	4,021	+1.07%
1999	4,440	+1.11%
2007	5,045	+1.61%
2012	5,293	+0.96%
2017	5,891	+2.16%
2023	6,080	+0.53%

Source: EHESS and INSEE (1968-2023)

== Sights ==
- Church of Sainte Baudille, located in the site of a 3rd-century Palaeo-Christian worship area and of a Roman temple. The current building was built by will of the bishops of Avignon in the 10th century
- Chapel of the White Penitents, built in the 12th century over a former synagogue.
- Church of Notre-Dame de Piété, founded as a Franciscan hermitage in the 13th century. The current edifice dates to the 1630 and 1720s reconstructions.

== Twin towns ==
- Calcinaia, Italy

== See also ==
- Communes of the Bouches-du-Rhône department
