= Orgon =

Commune in Provence-Alpes-Côte d'Azur, France

- Commune
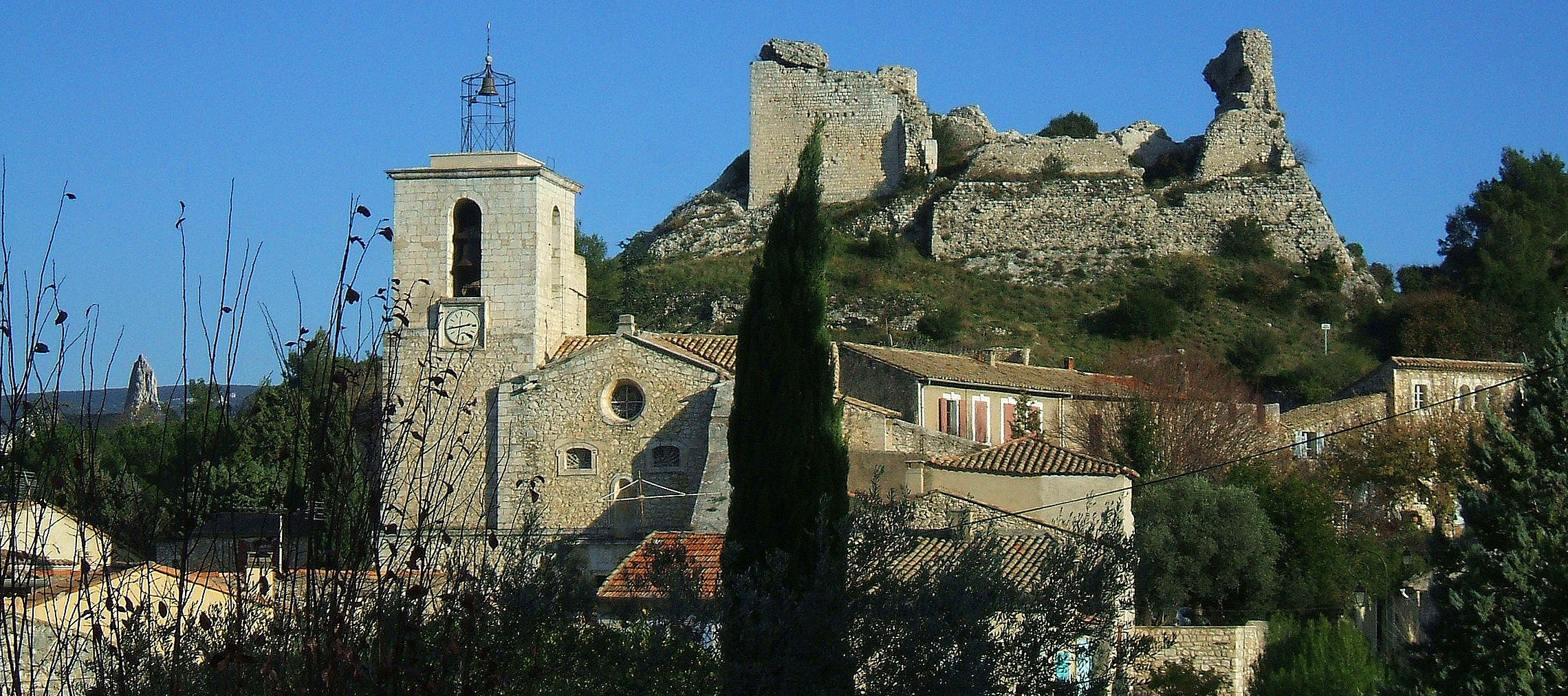
- Church of the Assumption and castle of the Duke of Guise

- Coat of arms
- Location of Orgon
- Location within France Location within Provence-Alpes-Côte d'Azur
- Coordinates: 43°47′29″N 5°02′20″E
- Country: France
- Region: Provence-Alpes-Côte d'Azur
- Department: Bouches-du-Rhône
- Arrondissement: Arles
- Canton: Salon-de-Provence-1
- Intercommunality: CA Terre de Provence

Government
  - Mayor (2026–32): Angélique Ytier Clareton
- Area^{1}: 34.78 km^{2} (13.43 sq mi)
- Highest elevation: 298 m (978 ft)
- Lowest elevation: 62 m (203 ft)
- Population (2023): 2,762
  - Density: 79.41/km^{2} (205.7/sq mi)
- Time zone: UTC+01:00 (CET)
  - Summer (DST): UTC+02:00 (CEST)
- INSEE/Postal code: 13067 /13667
- ^{1} French Land Register data, which excludes lakes, ponds, glaciers > 1 km^{2} (0.386 sq mi or 247 acres) and river estuaries.

Orgon (French pronunciation: [ɔʁɡɔ̃]; ancient: Urgonum, or Castrum de Urgone) is a commune in the Bouches-du-Rhône department in the Provence-Alpes-Côte d'Azur region in Southern France. It is located on the departmental border with Vaucluse, which follows the river Durance.

== Geography ==
Neighbouring villages and small towns include Les Baux-de-Provence, Saint-Rémy-de-Provence and Cavaillon. Orgon is one of the twelve communes of the Alpilles area, a small mountain chain made famous through the paintings of Vincent van Gogh and novels of the French author Alphonse Daudet. The river Durance runs through it.

== Demographics ==
In 1923 the commune of Plan-d'Orgon was created from part of Orgon.

Historical population

Year	Pop.	±% p.a.
1793	1,900	—
1800	1,829	−0.54%
1806	2,100	+2.33%
1821	2,036	−0.21%
1831	2,584	+2.41%
1836	2,641	+0.44%
1841	2,748	+0.80%
1846	2,932	+1.30%
1851	3,089	+1.05%
1856	3,060	−0.19%
1861	3,174	+0.73%
1866	2,984	−1.23%
1872	3,160	+0.96%
1876	2,789	−3.07%
1881	2,816	+0.19%
1886	2,818	+0.01%
1891	2,637	−1.32%
1896	2,616	−0.16%
1901	2,624	+0.06%

Year	Pop.	±% p.a.
1906	2,610	−0.11%
1911	2,703	+0.70%
1921	2,439	−1.02%
1926	1,315	−11.62%
1931	1,421	+1.56%
1936	1,461	+0.56%
1946	1,383	−0.55%
1954	1,512	+1.12%
1962	1,874	+2.72%
1968	2,049	+1.50%
1975	2,285	+1.57%
1982	2,339	+0.33%
1990	2,453	+0.60%
1999	2,642	+0.83%
2007	3,005	+1.62%
2012	3,120	+0.75%
2017	2,963	−1.03%
2023	2,762	−1.16%

Source: EHESS and INSEE (1968–2023)

== Sights ==
The village of Orgon harbours a 19th-century monastery overlooking the Durance valley (Notre Dame du Beauregard) and the ruins of a Templar castle.

== History ==
In history, Orgon is known through the attempted lynching of Napoleon Bonaparte on his way to Saint Helane passing through the village. Orgon was also the birthplace of the French peot Antoine Pomme (1620) and the painter Louis Espérandieu (1787-1857).

== Ecology ==
Having given its name to a specific type of limestone found only in this area, the recent plans of extension of the mining activities of the company OMYA in Orgon have led to protest actions by French intellectuals throughout the country, worried about the risks to the preservation of the natural and historic specificities of Alpilles hills. The dispute regarding the extension plans of the multi-national mining company OMYA have to an extent come to an end through the announced nomination of the territory as a protected Regional Parc as of 1 January 2007.

== See also ==
- Communes of the Bouches-du-Rhône department
