= Communauté d'agglomération Terre de Provence =

Terre de Provence
- Communauté d'agglomération
- Interactive map of Terre de Provence
- Coordinates: 43°51′N 04°54′E
- Country: France
- Region: Provence-Alpes-Côte d'Azur
- Department: Bouches-du-Rhône
- No. of communes: {{{nbcomm}}}
- Established: 1996
- Area: 265.9 km^{2} (102.7 sq mi)
- Population (2019): 59,775
  - Density: 224.8/km^{2} (582.2/sq mi)
- Website: www.terredeprovence-agglo.com

Communauté d'agglomération Terre de Provence is the communauté d'agglomération, an intercommunal structure, covering the area around the town of Châteaurenard. It is located in the Bouches-du-Rhône department, in the Provence-Alpes-Côte d'Azur region, southeastern France. Created in 1996, its seat is in Eyragues. Its area is 265.9 km^{2}. Its population was 59,775 in 2019.

== Composition ==
The communauté d'agglomération consists of the following 13 communes:

1. Barbentane
2. Cabannes
3. Châteaurenard
4. Eyragues
5. Graveson
6. Maillane
7. Mollégès
8. Noves
9. Orgon
10. Plan-d'Orgon
11. Rognonas
12. Saint-Andiol
13. Verquières
