= Samuel Graveson =

British printer and philatelist

Samuel Graveson (1868–1957) was a British printer and philatelist who was added to the Roll of Distinguished Philatelists in 1948.

Graveson was a specialised in British postal history and editor of the Postal History Society Bulletin from 1936 to 1947.

== Selected publications ==
- Ocean Penny Post.
