= Graveson =

Commune in Provence-Alpes-Côte d'Azur, France

- Commune
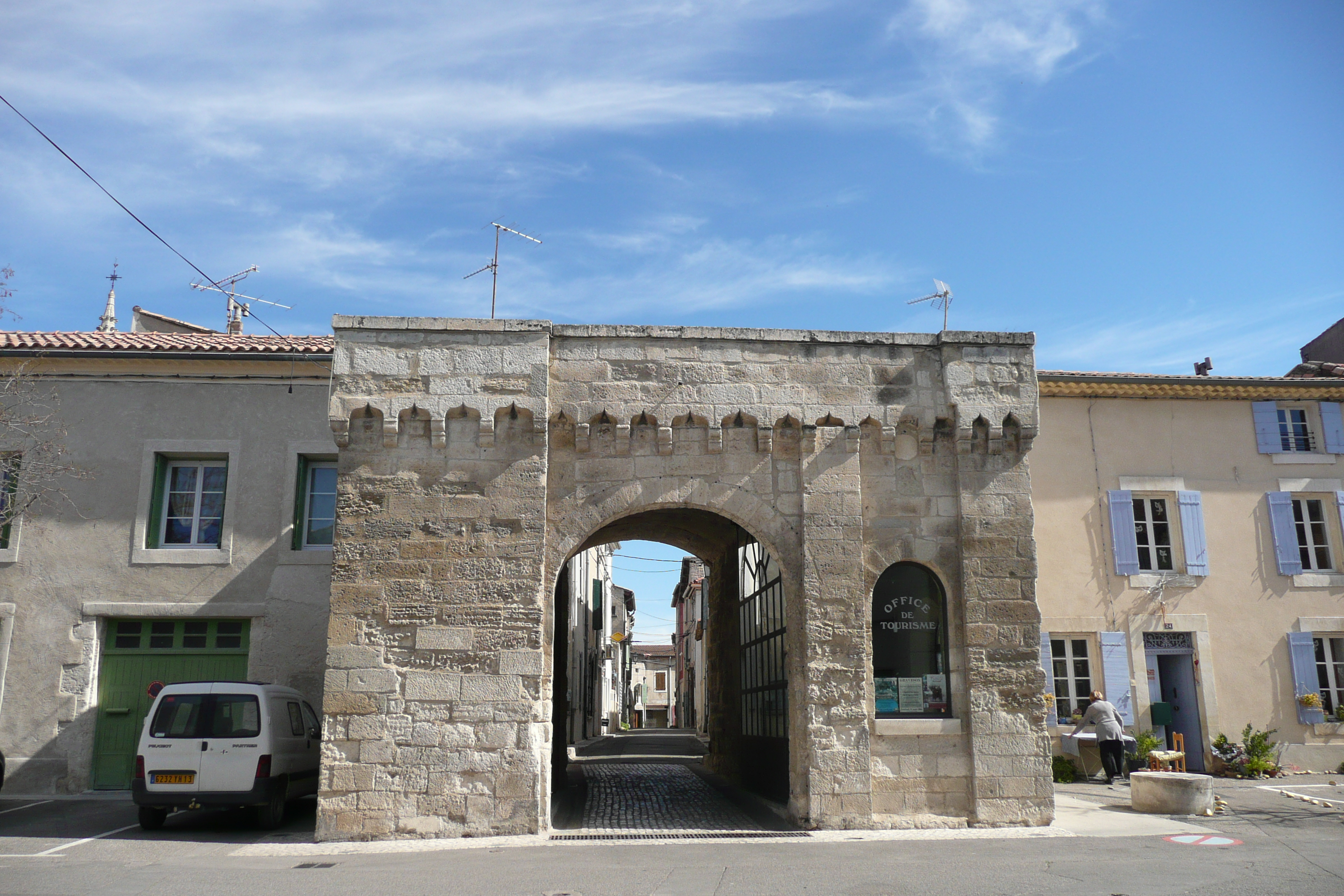
- City gate

- Coat of arms
- Location of Graveson
- Location within France Location within Provence-Alpes-Côte d'Azur
- Coordinates: 43°51′04″N 4°46′25″E
- Country: France
- Region: Provence-Alpes-Côte d'Azur
- Department: Bouches-du-Rhône
- Arrondissement: Arles
- Canton: Châteaurenard
- Intercommunality: CA Terre de Provence

Government
  - Mayor (2026–32): Michel Pécout
- Area^{1}: 23.54 km^{2} (9.09 sq mi)
- Highest elevation: 143 m (469 ft)
- Lowest elevation: 8 m (26 ft)
- Population (2023): 4,698
  - Density: 199.6/km^{2} (516.9/sq mi)
- Demonym: Gravesonnais
- Time zone: UTC+01:00 (CET)
  - Summer (DST): UTC+02:00 (CEST)
- INSEE/Postal code: 13045 /13690
- ^{1} French Land Register data, which excludes lakes, ponds, glaciers > 1 km^{2} (0.386 sq mi or 247 acres) and river estuaries.

Graveson (French pronunciation: [ɡʁavəzɔ̃]; Occitan in the Mistralian norm: Gravesoun) is a commune in the Bouches-du-Rhône department in southern France.

== Population ==
Historical population

Year	Pop.	±% p.a.
1793	1,600	—
1800	1,520	−0.73%
1806	1,549	+0.32%
1821	1,454	−0.42%
1831	1,528	+0.50%
1836	1,478	−0.66%
1841	1,447	−0.42%
1846	1,570	+1.65%
1851	1,709	+1.71%
1856	1,675	−0.40%
1861	1,724	+0.58%
1866	1,700	−0.28%
1872	1,659	−0.41%
1876	1,600	−0.90%
1881	1,570	−0.38%
1886	1,622	+0.65%
1891	1,615	−0.09%
1896	1,616	+0.01%
1901	1,684	+0.83%

Year	Pop.	±% p.a.
1906	1,754	+0.82%
1911	1,758	+0.05%
1921	1,665	−0.54%
1926	1,814	+1.73%
1931	1,805	−0.10%
1936	1,888	+0.90%
1946	1,935	+0.25%
1954	1,912	−0.15%
1962	2,035	+0.78%
1968	2,024	−0.09%
1975	2,134	+0.76%
1982	2,276	+0.92%
1990	2,752	+2.40%
1999	3,188	+1.65%
2007	3,797	+2.21%
2012	4,271	+2.38%
2017	4,864	+2.63%
2023	4,698	−0.58%

Source: EHESS and INSEE (1968-2023)

== See also ==
- Communes of the Bouches-du-Rhône department
