= Saint-Andiol =

Commune in Provence-Alpes-Côte d'Azur, France

Saint-Andiol Sant Andiòu (Occitan)
- Commune
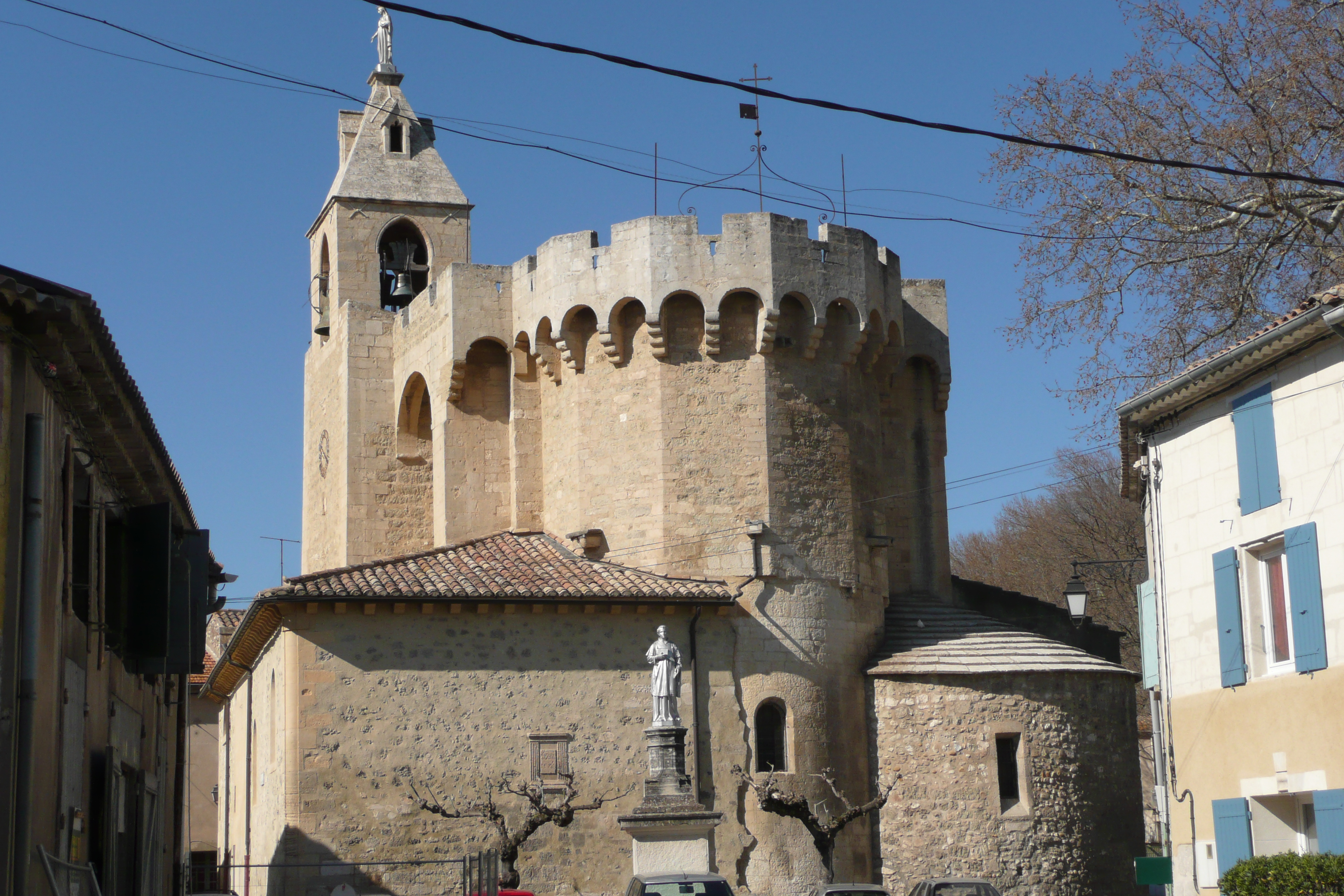
- The church in Saint-Andiol

- Coat of arms
- Location of Saint-Andiol
- Location within France Location within Provence-Alpes-Côte d'Azur
- Coordinates: 43°50′11″N 4°56′43″E
- Country: France
- Region: Provence-Alpes-Côte d'Azur
- Department: Bouches-du-Rhône
- Arrondissement: Arles
- Canton: Châteaurenard
- Intercommunality: CA Terre de Provence

Government
  - Mayor (2026–32): Jean-Luc Perin
- Area^{1}: 16 km^{2} (6.2 sq mi)
- Elevation: 53 m (174 ft)
- Highest elevation: 67 m (220 ft)
- Lowest elevation: 47 m (154 ft)
- Population (2023): 3,353
  - Density: 210/km^{2} (540/sq mi)
- Time zone: UTC+01:00 (CET)
  - Summer (DST): UTC+02:00 (CEST)
- INSEE/Postal code: 13089 /13670
- ^{1} French Land Register data, which excludes lakes, ponds, glaciers > 1 km^{2} (0.386 sq mi or 247 acres) and river estuaries.

Saint-Andiol (French pronunciation: [sɛ̃.t‿ɑ̃djɔl]; Occitan: Sant Andiòu) is a commune in the Bouches-du-Rhône department in the Provence-Alpes-Côte d'Azur region in Southern France.

== Demographics ==
Historical population

Year	Pop.	±% p.a.
1793	590	—
1800	740	+3.29%
1806	776	+0.79%
1821	933	+1.24%
1831	1,080	+1.47%
1836	1,140	+1.09%
1841	1,251	+1.88%
1846	1,324	+1.14%
1851	1,377	+0.79%
1856	1,448	+1.01%
1861	1,454	+0.08%
1866	1,429	−0.35%
1872	1,381	−0.57%
1876	1,170	−4.06%
1881	1,265	+1.57%
1886	1,236	−0.46%
1891	1,182	−0.89%
1896	1,232	+0.83%
1901	1,276	+0.70%

Year	Pop.	±% p.a.
1906	1,229	−0.75%
1911	1,320	+1.44%
1921	1,253	−0.52%
1926	1,362	+1.68%
1931	1,524	+2.27%
1936	1,508	−0.21%
1946	1,596	+0.57%
1954	1,616	+0.16%
1962	1,805	+1.39%
1968	2,023	+1.92%
1975	2,019	−0.03%
1982	2,372	+2.33%
1990	2,253	−0.64%
1999	2,605	+1.63%
2007	3,200	+2.60%
2012	3,298	+0.61%
2017	3,247	−0.31%
2023	3,353	+0.54%

Source: EHESS and INSEE (1968–2023)

== See also ==
- Communes of the Bouches-du-Rhône department
