= Saint-Pierre-de-Mézoargues =

Commune in Provence-Alpes-Côte d'Azur, France

- Commune
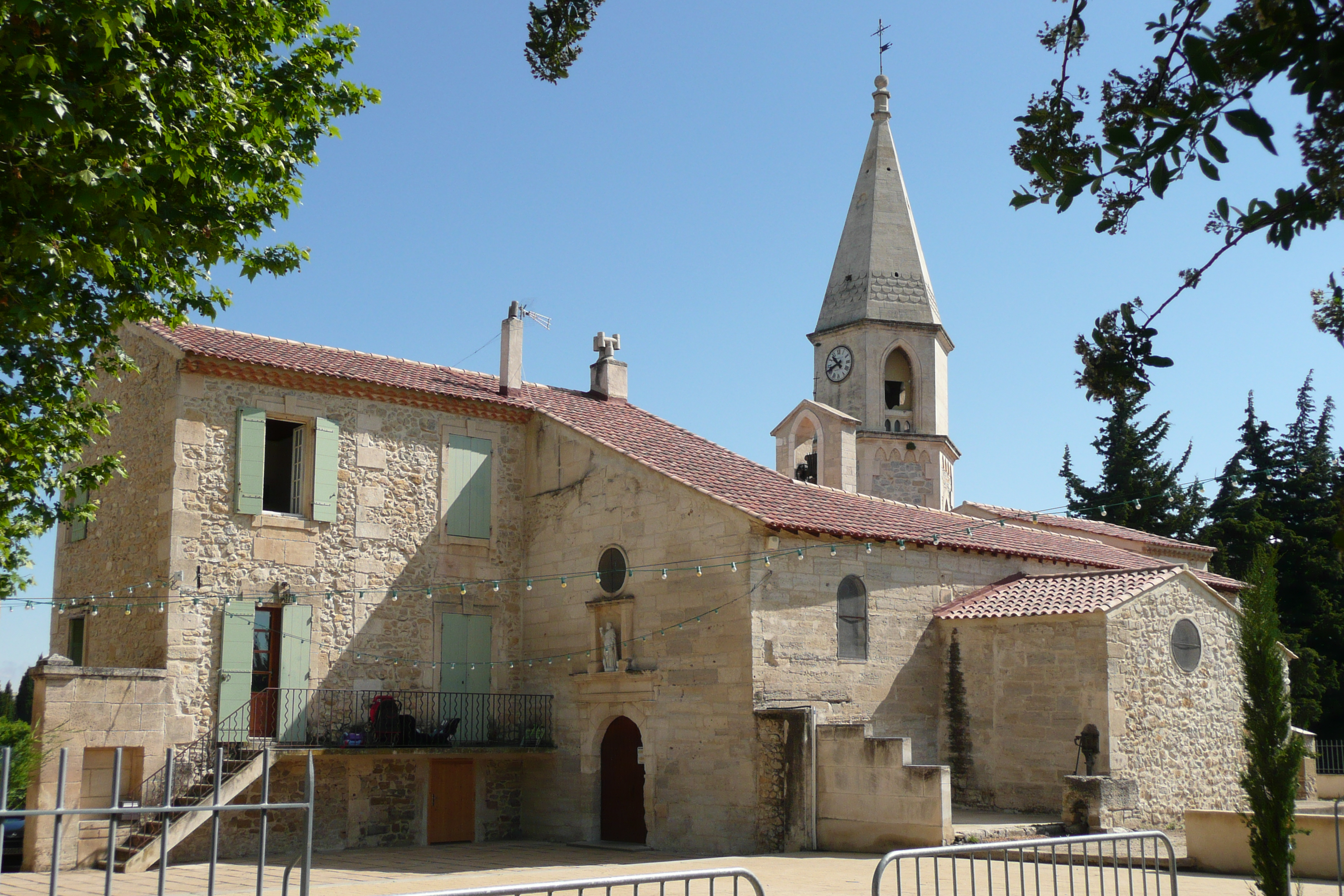
- The church in Saint-Pierre-de-Mézoargues

- Coat of arms
- Location of Saint-Pierre-de-Mézoargues
- Location within France Location within Provence-Alpes-Côte d'Azur
- Coordinates: 43°51′35″N 4°38′59″E
- Country: France
- Region: Provence-Alpes-Côte d'Azur
- Department: Bouches-du-Rhône
- Arrondissement: Arles
- Canton: Châteaurenard
- Intercommunality: CA Arles-Crau-Camargue-Montagnette

Government
  - Mayor (2026–32): Laurie Pons
- Area^{1}: 4.13 km^{2} (1.59 sq mi)
- Elevation: 12 m (39 ft)
- Highest elevation: 18 m (59 ft)
- Lowest elevation: 9 m (30 ft)
- Population (2023): 229
  - Density: 55.4/km^{2} (144/sq mi)
- Time zone: UTC+01:00 (CET)
  - Summer (DST): UTC+02:00 (CEST)
- INSEE/Postal code: 13061 /13150
- ^{1} French Land Register data, which excludes lakes, ponds, glaciers > 1 km^{2} (0.386 sq mi or 247 acres) and river estuaries.

Saint-Pierre-de-Mézoargues (French pronunciation: [sɛ̃ pjɛʁ də mezoaʁg]; Occitan: Sant Pèire de Mesoarga, before 1992: Mézoargues) is a commune in the Bouches-du-Rhône department in southern France.

== Population ==
Historical population
Year	Pop.	±% p.a.
1968	204	—
1975	182	−1.62%
1982	215	+2.41%
1990	217	+0.12%
1999	225	+0.40%
2007	257	+1.68%
2012	232	−2.03%
2017	207	−2.25%
2023	229	+1.70%
Source: INSEE

== See also ==
- Communes of the Bouches-du-Rhône department
