= Communauté d'agglomération Arles-Crau-Camargue-Montagnette =

Coordinates: 43°41′N 4°39′E

Arles-Crau-Camargue-Montagnette
- Communauté d'agglomération
- Country: France
- Region: Provence-Alpes-Côte d'Azur
- Department: Bouches-du-Rhône
- No. of communes: {{{nbcomm}}}
- Established: 2003

Government
  - President: Claude Vulpian
- Area: 1,446 km^{2} (558 sq mi)
- Population (2018): 83,669
  - Density: 57.86/km^{2} (149.9/sq mi)

The Communauté d'agglomération Arles-Crau-Camargue-Montagnette (CCAM) is the communauté d'agglomération, an intercommunal structure, centred on the city of Arles. It is located in the Bouches-du-Rhône department, in the Provence-Alpes-Côte d'Azur region, southeastern France. It was created in December 2003. Its area is 1445.8 km^{2}. Its population was 83,669 in 2018, of which 51,031 in Arles proper.

== Composition ==
The communauté d'agglomération consists of the following 6 communes:

1. Arles
2. Boulbon
3. Saintes-Maries-de-la-Mer
4. Saint-Martin-de-Crau
5. Saint-Pierre-de-Mézoargues
6. Tarascon

== See also ==
- Crau
- Camargue
