= Mas-Blanc-des-Alpilles =

Commune in Provence-Alpes-Côte d'Azur, France

- Commune
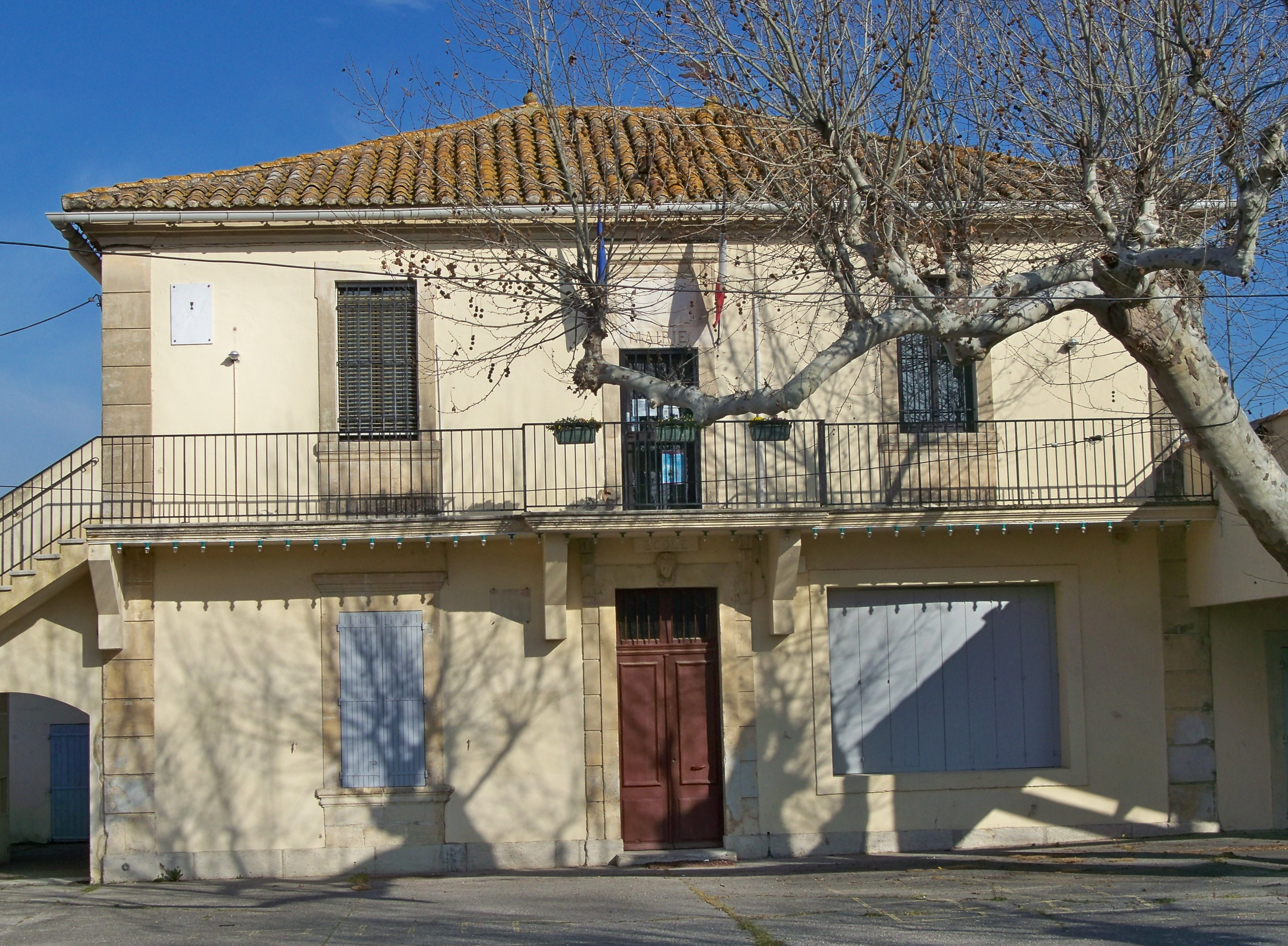
- Town hall

- Coat of arms
- Location of Mas-Blanc-des-Alpilles
- Location within France Location within Provence-Alpes-Côte d'Azur
- Coordinates: 43°47′24″N 4°45′28″E
- Country: France
- Region: Provence-Alpes-Côte d'Azur
- Department: Bouches-du-Rhône
- Arrondissement: Arles
- Canton: Salon-de-Provence-1

Government
  - Mayor (2026–32): Laurent Geslin
- Area^{1}: 1.57 km^{2} (0.61 sq mi)
- Elevation: 15 m (49 ft)
- Highest elevation: 65 m (213 ft)
- Lowest elevation: 9 m (30 ft)
- Population (2023): 564
  - Density: 359/km^{2} (930/sq mi)
- Time zone: UTC+01:00 (CET)
  - Summer (DST): UTC+02:00 (CEST)
- INSEE/Postal code: 13057 /13103
- ^{1} French Land Register data, which excludes lakes, ponds, glaciers > 1 km^{2} (0.386 sq mi or 247 acres) and river estuaries.

Mas-Blanc-des-Alpilles (French pronunciation: [mas blɑ̃ dez‿alpij]; Occitan: Mas Blanc deis Aupilhas) is a commune in the Bouches-du-Rhône department in southern France.

== Population ==
Historical population
Year	Pop.	±% p.a.
1968	136	—
1975	139	+0.31%
1982	248	+8.62%
1990	348	+4.33%
1999	373	+0.77%
2007	491	+3.50%
2012	507	+0.64%
2017	511	+0.16%
2023	564	+1.66%
Source: INSEE

== See also ==
- Alpilles
- Communes of the Bouches-du-Rhône department
