= Saint-Étienne-du-Grès =

Commune in Provence-Alpes-Côte d'Azur, France

- Commune
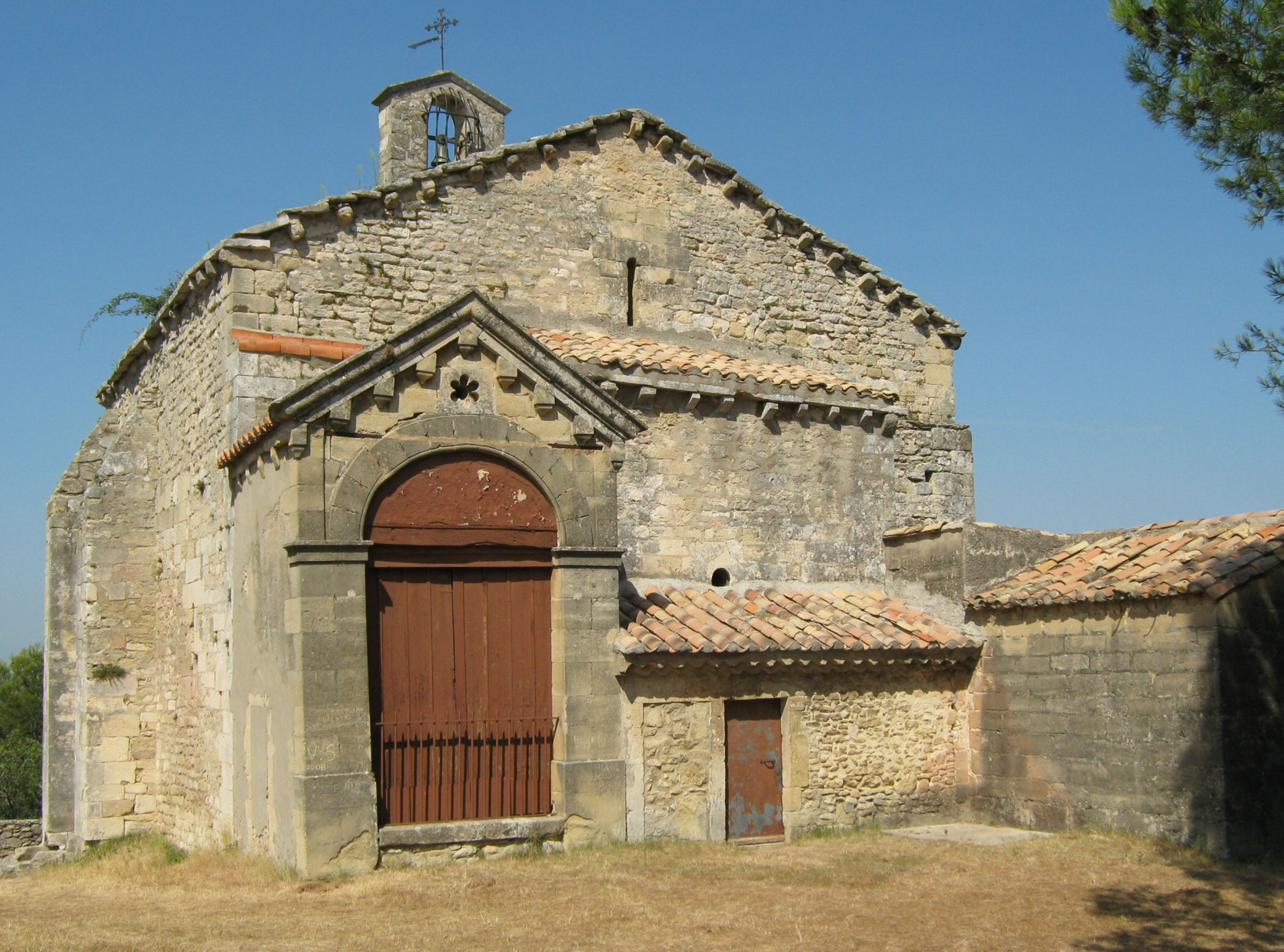
- Notre-Dame du Château Chapel

- Coat of arms
- Location of Saint-Étienne-du-Grès
- Location within France Location within Provence-Alpes-Côte d'Azur
- Coordinates: 43°46′53″N 4°43′34″E
- Country: France
- Region: Provence-Alpes-Côte d'Azur
- Department: Bouches-du-Rhône
- Arrondissement: Arles
- Canton: Salon-de-Provence-1

Government
  - Mayor (2026–32): Jean Mangion
- Area^{1}: 29.04 km^{2} (11.21 sq mi)
- Elevation: 10 m (33 ft)
- Highest elevation: 231 m (758 ft)
- Lowest elevation: 5 m (16 ft)
- Population (2023): 2,489
  - Density: 85.71/km^{2} (222.0/sq mi)
- Time zone: UTC+01:00 (CET)
  - Summer (DST): UTC+02:00 (CEST)
- INSEE/Postal code: 13094 /13103
- ^{1} French Land Register data, which excludes lakes, ponds, glaciers > 1 km^{2} (0.386 sq mi or 247 acres) and river estuaries.

Saint-Étienne-du-Grès (French pronunciation: [sɛ̃t‿etjɛn dy ɡʁɛs]; Provençal: Sant Estève dau Gres) is a commune in the Bouches-du-Rhône department in the Provence-Alpes-Côte d'Azur region in southern France. The commune was created in 1935 from part of Tarascon. It is situated at the northwestern foot of the Alpilles. The French Protestant Pomeyrol Community has settled in the village since 1937.

== Population ==
Historical population

Year	Pop.	±% p.a.
1936	1,181	—
1946	1,222	+0.34%
1954	1,217	−0.05%
1962	1,214	−0.03%
1968	1,421	+2.66%
1975	1,484	+0.62%
1982	1,601	+1.09%

Year	Pop.	±% p.a.
1990	1,863	+1.91%
1999	2,103	+1.36%
2007	2,117	+0.08%
2012	2,302	+1.69%
2017	2,481	+1.51%
2023	2,489	+0.05%

Source: EHESS and INSEE (1968-2023)

== See also ==
- Communes of the Bouches-du-Rhône department
