= Canton of Châteaurenard =

Coordinates: 43.88°N 4.85°E

- Canton
- Situation of the canton of Châteaurenard in the department of Bouches-du-Rhône
- Country: France
- Region: Provence-Alpes-Côte d'Azur
- Department: Bouches-du-Rhône
- No. of communes: {{{nbcomm}}}
- Population (2023): 75,031
- INSEE code: 1307

The canton of Châteaurenard is an administrative division of the Bouches-du-Rhône department, in southeastern France. At the French canton reorganisation which came into effect in March 2015, it was expanded from 6 to 15 communes. Its seat is in Châteaurenard.

It consists of the following communes:

1. Barbentane
2. Boulbon
3. Cabannes
4. Châteaurenard
5. Eyragues
6. Graveson
7. Maillane
8. Mollégès
9. Noves
10. Plan-d'Orgon
11. Rognonas
12. Saint-Andiol
13. Saint-Pierre-de-Mézoargues
14. Tarascon
15. Verquières
