= Boulbon =

Commune in Provence-Alpes-Côte d'Azur, France

- Commune
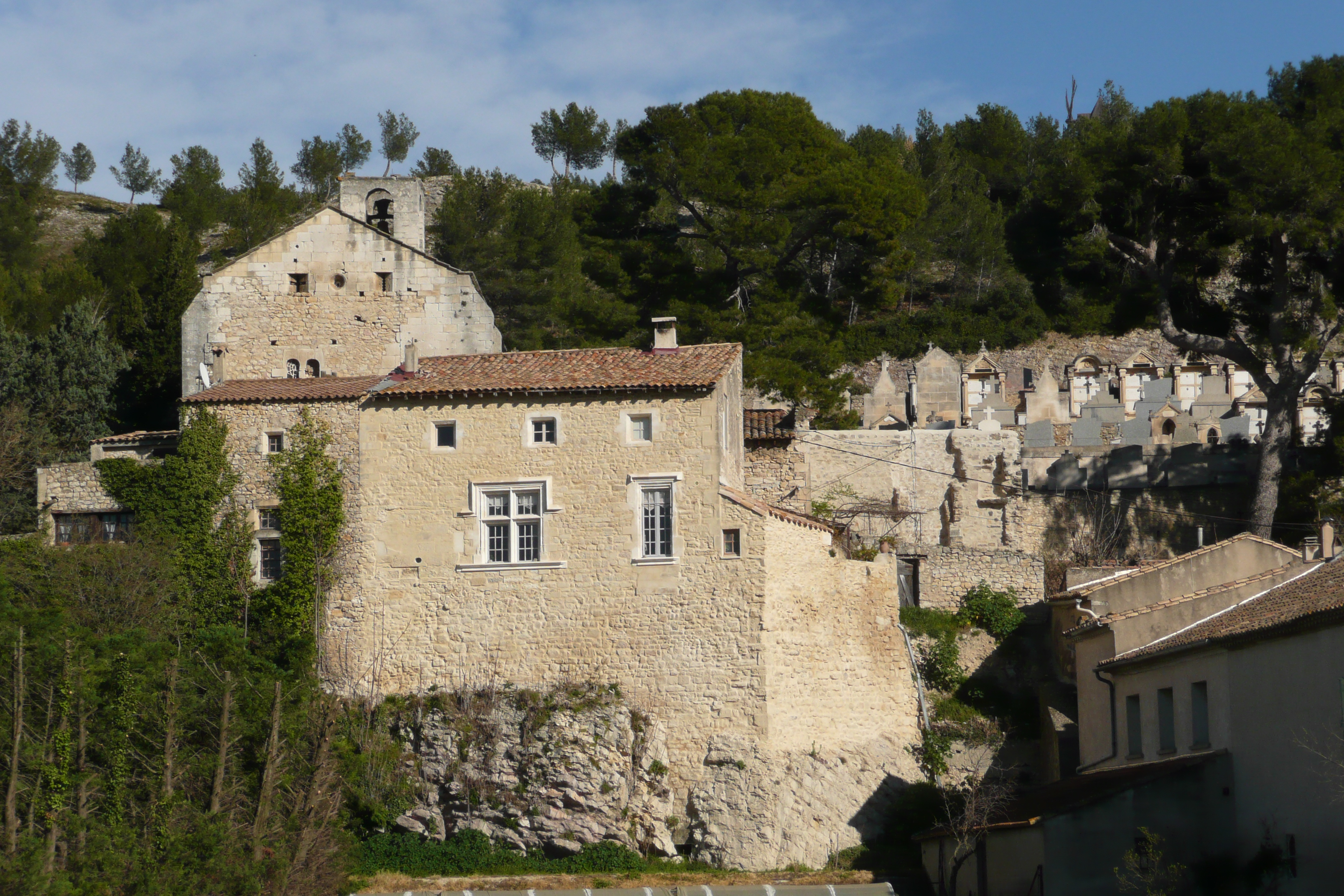
- Partial view of Boulbon with Saint-Marcellin Chapel

- Coat of arms
- Location of Boulbon
- Location within France Location within Provence-Alpes-Côte d'Azur
- Coordinates: 43°51′48″N 4°41′39″E
- Country: France
- Region: Provence-Alpes-Côte d'Azur
- Department: Bouches-du-Rhône
- Arrondissement: Arles
- Canton: Châteaurenard
- Intercommunality: CA Arles-Crau-Camargue-Montagnette

Government
  - Mayor (2026–32): Jérémie Becciu
- Area^{1}: 19.33 km^{2} (7.46 sq mi)
- Elevation: 51 m (167 ft)
- Highest elevation: 165 m (541 ft)
- Lowest elevation: 10 m (33 ft)
- Population (2023): 1,543
  - Density: 79.82/km^{2} (206.7/sq mi)
- Time zone: UTC+01:00 (CET)
  - Summer (DST): UTC+02:00 (CEST)
- INSEE/Postal code: 13017 /13150
- ^{1} French Land Register data, which excludes lakes, ponds, glaciers > 1 km^{2} (0.386 sq mi or 247 acres) and river estuaries.

Boulbon (French pronunciation: [bulbɔ̃]; Occitan: Borbon) is a commune in the Bouches-du-Rhône department in southern France. The Baroque composer and serpent player Guillaume Poitevin (1646–1706) was born in Boulbon.

== Population ==
Historical population
Year	Pop.	±% p.a.
1968	935	—
1975	836	−1.59%
1982	1,042	+3.20%
1990	1,329	+3.09%
1999	1,510	+1.43%
2007	1,535	+0.21%
2012	1,510	−0.33%
2017	1,506	−0.05%
2023	1,543	+0.41%
Source: INSEE

== See also ==
- Communes of the Bouches-du-Rhône department
