= Lamanon =

Commune in Provence-Alpes-Côte d'Azur, France

- Commune
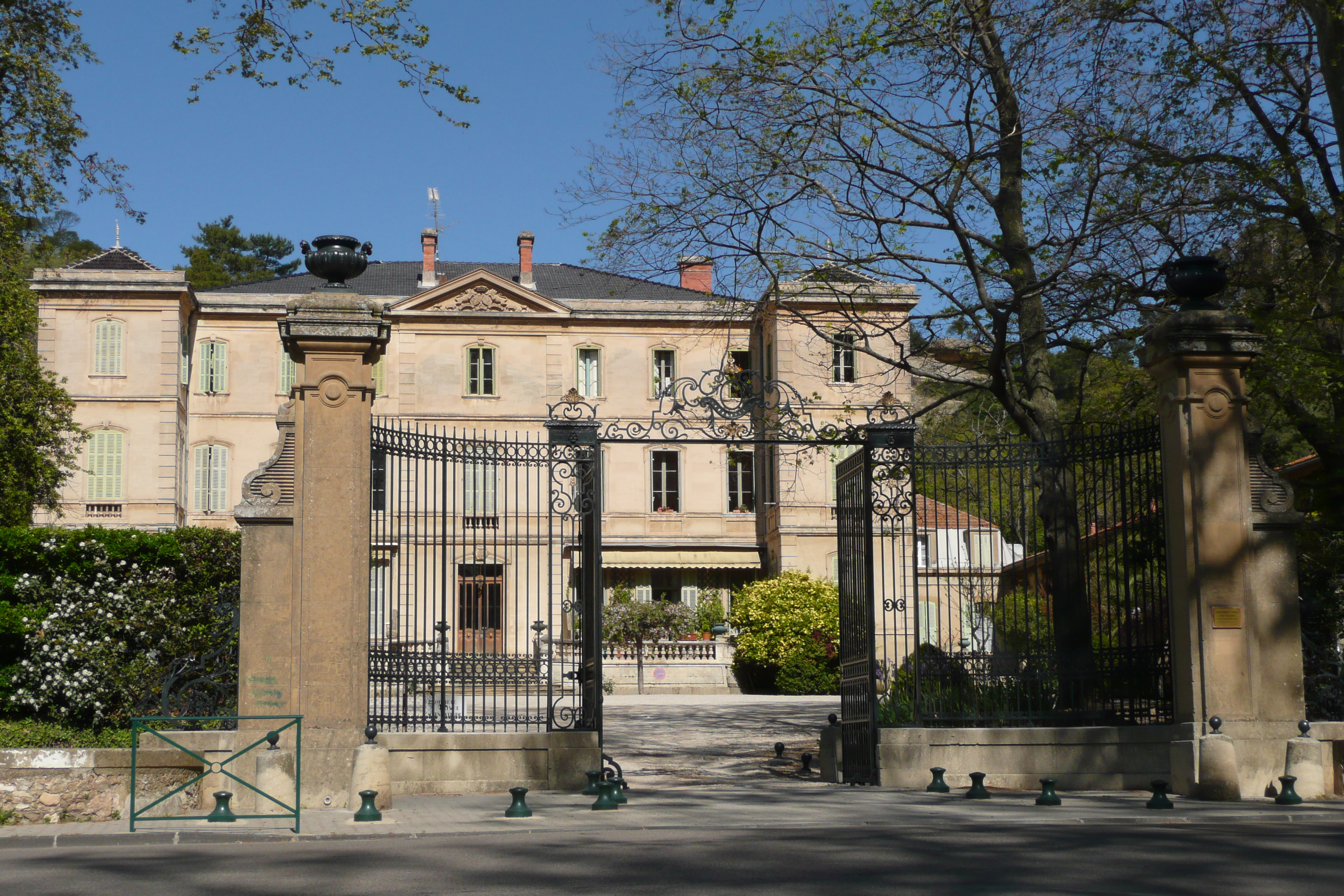
- Castle

- Coat of arms
- Location of Lamanon
- Location within France Location within Provence-Alpes-Côte d'Azur
- Coordinates: 43°42′10″N 5°05′13″E
- Country: France
- Region: Provence-Alpes-Côte d'Azur
- Department: Bouches-du-Rhône
- Arrondissement: Aix-en-Provence
- Canton: Salon-de-Provence-1
- Intercommunality: Aix-Marseille-Provence

Government
  - Mayor (2026–32): Christian Nervi
- Area^{1}: 19.19 km^{2} (7.41 sq mi)
- Elevation: 112 m (367 ft)
- Highest elevation: 326 m (1,070 ft)
- Lowest elevation: 94 m (308 ft)
- Population (2023): 2,097
  - Density: 109.3/km^{2} (283.0/sq mi)
- Time zone: UTC+01:00 (CET)
  - Summer (DST): UTC+02:00 (CEST)
- INSEE/Postal code: 13049 /13113
- ^{1} French Land Register data, which excludes lakes, ponds, glaciers > 1 km^{2} (0.386 sq mi or 247 acres) and river estuaries.

Lamanon (French pronunciation: [lamanɔ̃]) is a commune located in the Bouches-du-Rhône department, part of the Provence-Alpes-Côte d'Azur region in southern France. Its inhabitants are called Lamanonais in French.

North of the village the archaeological site of Grottes de Calès represents a cave dwelling from prehistoric to medieval times.

== Toponym ==
The oldest known form is Alamannon, found around 1031. It changes then towards de Lamanone (1253). This toponym could come from a German name, Alaman, together with the suffix -onem, while the initial a disappeared due to apheresis.

Lamanon is pronounced Lamanoun in provençal in the Mistralian norm.

== Geography and climate ==
=== Directions ===
Railroads

- Trunk roads : the Route nationale 538 (RN 538) crosses the village from the north to the south while the RN 17d runs alongside the east-west direction. The RN 72 and 72f connect it to the neighbouring village in the West, Eyguières.
- Motorway : the nearest motorway is the A7 autoroute, reachable by two interchanges : Salon-Nord or Sénas. There is a rest area near Lamanon.

Public transport

- Libébus : the village is served by two bus lines from the agglomeration community's (Agglopole Provence) public transport network.: lines 11 and 12.
- TER PACA : line 9 of the regional train service (Marseille-Avignon, by Salon and Cavaillon) passes through the village.

=== Geology ===
On the west side of the village stands the défens of Eyguières, the eastern part of the chaîne des Alpilles. Défens is a French medieval term for a lord's property used as a warren or a hunting place. Similarly, in the north-east, one finds the défens of Alleins. The Roquerousse hills are located in the south-east of the village.

During the Miocene epoch, 12 million years ago, the river Durance did not flow into the Rhône but into the Mediterranean Sea. It passed nearby Lamanon before forming a large delta covering what is now the Berre lagoon and the Crau plains. Therefore, Lamanon is situated in the ancient Durance valley.

=== Climate ===
The climate in the Alpilles is considered as mediterranean. Winters are mild and dry while summers are warm and dry. The hottest months are July and August when the mean temperature rises to (+29 °C); in December and January, the chillest months, it drops to (+3 °C). The rainiest month is January with 7 days of rain on average, against 2 days in July. The Alpilles area receives more precipitation than the Mediterranean seaside : 500 mm/year in Camargue against 600–700 mm/year in the Alpilles.

There have been dramatic freezes in the 19th century with the Rhône turning to ice, but since then it has become very rare.

==== The mistral ====
The mistral is a very powerful north/north-east wind, blowing strongly 100 days per year on average and slightly 83 days per year, which leaves only 182 days without wind per year.

It is said to be two sorts of mistral: the "white mistral" clearing the sky from any cloud and the "black mistral" accompanied by rain.

==== Meteorological data ====
Lamanon does not have a weather station, the nearest being in Salon-de-Provence.

The following table shows temperatures and rains for the period 1971-2000:

Climate data for Salon de Provence
Month	Jan	Feb	Mar	Apr	May	Jun	Jul	Aug	Sep	Oct	Nov	Dec	Year
Mean daily maximum °C (°F)	10.9 (51.6)	12.3 (54.1)	15.3 (59.5)	17.5 (63.5)	22 (72)	25.8 (78.4)	29.4 (84.9)	29 (84)	25 (77)	19.9 (67.8)	14.2 (57.6)	11.6 (52.9)	19.4 (66.9)
Daily mean °C (°F)	6.1 (43.0)	7.2 (45.0)	9.7 (49.5)	12 (54)	16.1 (61.0)	19.8 (67.6)	22.9 (73.2)	22.7 (72.9)	19.2 (66.6)	14.7 (58.5)	9.6 (49.3)	7 (45)	13.9 (57.0)
Mean daily minimum °C (°F)	1.2 (34.2)	2 (36)	4 (39)	6.4 (43.5)	10.1 (50.2)	13.7 (56.7)	16.4 (61.5)	16.3 (61.3)	13.3 (55.9)	9.5 (49.1)	4.9 (40.8)	2.4 (36.3)	8.4 (47.0)
Average precipitation mm (inches)	59 (2.3)	47 (1.9)	44 (1.7)	63 (2.5)	42 (1.7)	31 (1.2)	16 (0.6)	37 (1.5)	64 (2.5)	98 (3.9)	58 (2.3)	54 (2.1)	623.4 (24.54)
Source: Météo France

== History ==
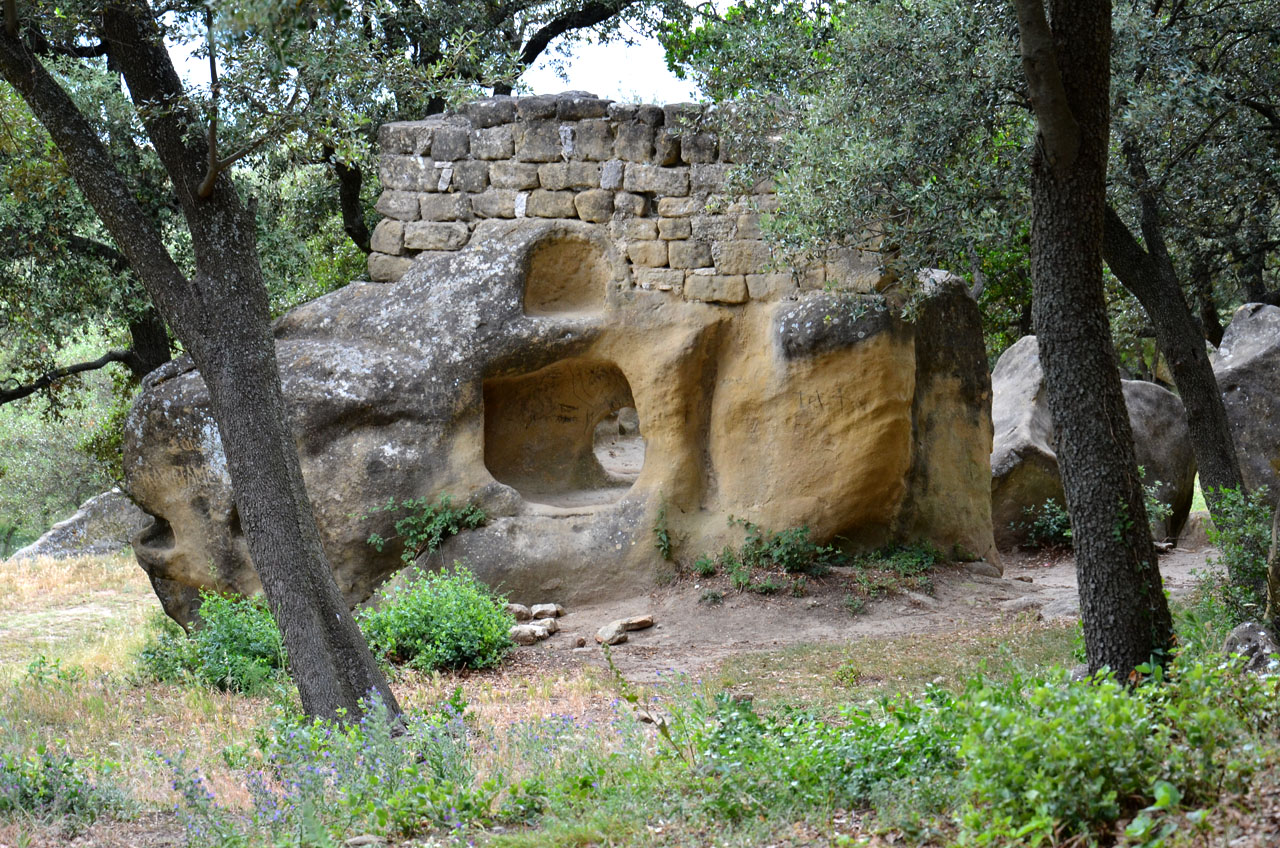
Grottes de Calès

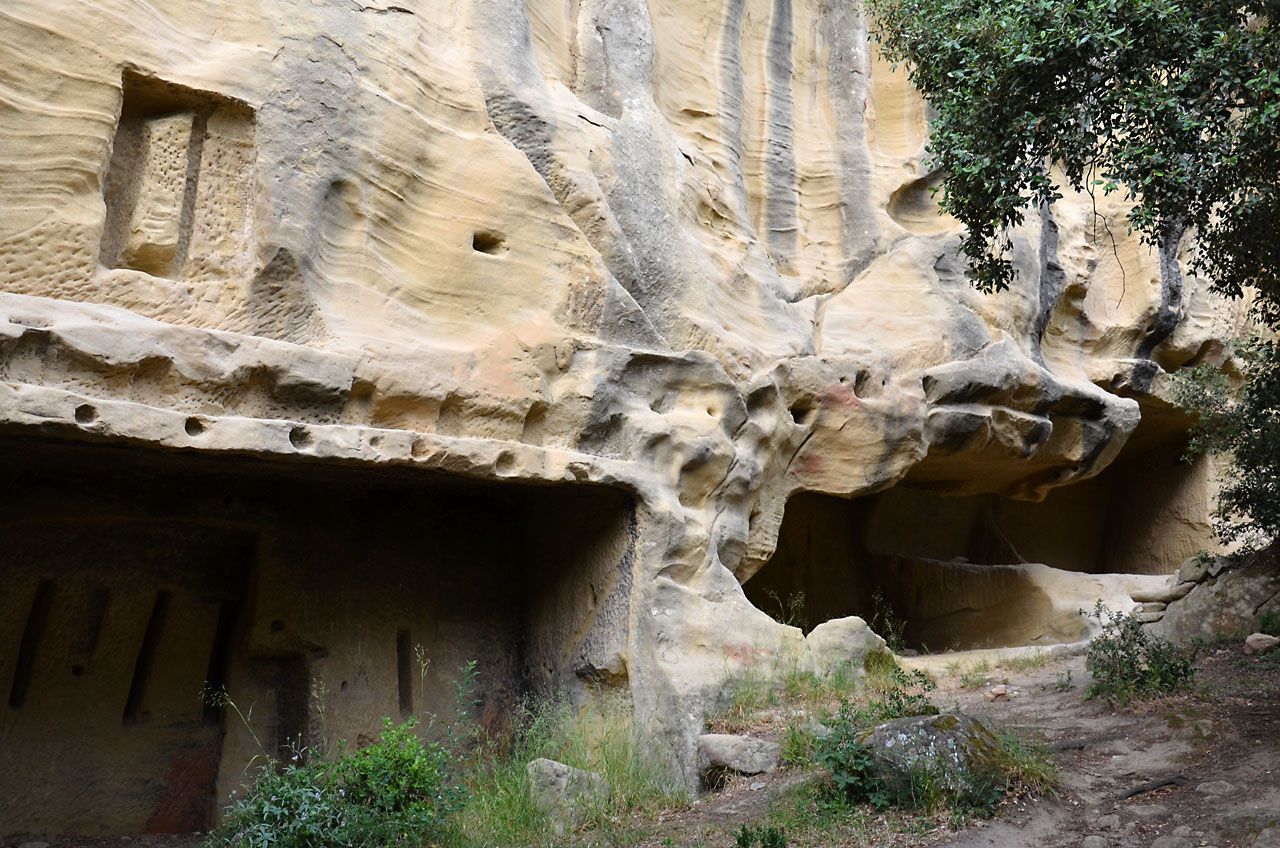
Grottes de Calès.

On the northern part of the current village, the archaeological place called Grottes de Calès features prehistoric dwelling sites. They were inhabited until the 16th century. Originally, it was an oppidum with roads connecting different villages. In the second half of the Iron Age (7th to 6th centuries BC), the population starts to settle down and to build the castrum, with streets and buildings. The increasing commerce in Méditerranée reaches the Alpilles where they trade cereals for luxury goods. In the following centuries, the population in the Alpilles decreased drastically because of the growing attraction of the Arles trading post. At the end of the Iron Age (2nd or 1st centuries BC), many sites were repopulated.

With the Roman invasion in Provence, the oppida in the Alpilles, including Lamanon's one, were dismantled, the only remaining being places of worship, such as the Saint-Jean chapel.

After the fall of the Western Roman Empire, the area became part of the County of Provence. After a time of turmoil, the death of Queen Joanna I in Naples, caused a war of succession for the County of Provence. An alliance of several Provençal towns (Aix, Nice and Tarascon) supported Charles of Durazzo, Queen Joanna I's adversary, murderer and successor, against Louis I of Anjou, brother of John II of France who was adopted by Queen Joanna in exchange of his help during the war against Charles of Durazzo. During summer 1383, Charles VI, King of France, Louis of Anjou's grandnephew, took action and mandated the Seneschal of Beaucaire, Enguerrand d'Eudin, to support Louis I in raising an army, thus conquering strongholds and villages, such as Lamanon. In 1384, Louis I of Anjou died after being crowned King of Naples (defeating Charles of Durazzo). Arles and Marseille, followed by a lot of towns, pledged allegiance to his son, Louis II of Anjou, who was only 7 years old. When his mother, Marie de Blois, Louis I's widow, arrived in Provence and asked Seneschal d'Eudin to give Lamanon up for Louis II, he refused on the name of Charles VI the King.

During the French Revolution, a comité de surveillance is established in Lamanon, charged to list every foreigner in France, as strangers were suspected to be plotters. It does not manage to recruit the twelve members as needed by the Convention and among those who were recruited were peasants and illiterates. Even though, the comité declared that they were no suspect in the village, which was only populated by farmers at this time.

== Administration ==
According to the French laws, due to its size, the village has a town council of 19 members (article L2121-2 du Code général des collectivités territoriales). At the last elections in 2014, Roland Darrouzès was re-elected for the sixth time with 54,87% of valid votes against Nicolas Sias, the participation rate being 72,53%. A recent modification of the vote procedure forbade to strike out names on the ballot paper, which was possible until then for villages under 3500 inhabitants. This led to situation, such as in 2008, where Roland Darrouzès scored the antepenultimate place but was still elected by his list as mayor.

=== Succession of mayors ===
From 1789 to 1799, the mayor was elected by direct suffrage for two years and re-eligible. The voters were the active citizens paying a tax equivalent to at least three working days in the village. To be candidate, one needed to pay taxes at least equal to ten working days.

From 1799 to 1848, the 22 frimaire an VIII constitution changed this procedure: mayors are now nominated by the préfet for small towns under 5000 inhabitants. During the Restauration regime, local councillors are also nominated. After 1831, the mayor is then nominated by the king for towns over 3000 inhabitants, by the préfet elsewise, but the local councillors are elected for six years.

From July 3, 1848, to 1851, mayors were elected by the town council for towns under 6000 inhabitants.

From 1851 to 1871, they were again nominated by the préfet in towns under 3000 inhabitants, for five years as for 1855.

Since 1871, mayors are elected by the town council after its election by universal suffrage.

Mayor	Term start	Term end	Party
Jean-Marie Chevallier	1971	1977	Apolitic
Roland Darrouzès	1977	-	Socialist

== Twin towns ==
Lamanon is twinned with:

- Gualba, Spain

== Population and society ==
=== Demography ===
Historical population

Year	Pop.	±% p.a.
1793	286	—
1800	229	−3.13%
1806	253	+1.67%
1821	355	+2.28%
1831	392	+1.00%
1836	422	+1.49%
1841	413	−0.43%
1846	438	+1.18%
1851	486	+2.10%
1856	474	−0.50%
1861	535	+2.45%
1866	477	−2.27%
1872	408	−2.57%
1876	438	+1.79%
1881	441	+0.14%
1886	404	−1.74%
1891	433	+1.40%
1896	450	+0.77%
1901	439	−0.49%

Year	Pop.	±% p.a.
1906	429	−0.46%
1911	451	+1.01%
1921	505	+1.14%
1926	532	+1.05%
1931	528	−0.15%
1936	487	−1.60%
1946	486	−0.02%
1954	670	+4.09%
1962	708	+0.69%
1968	735	+0.63%
1975	1,025	+4.87%
1982	1,377	+4.31%
1990	1,487	+0.97%
1999	1,713	+1.58%
2007	1,737	+0.17%
2012	1,900	+1.81%
2017	2,004	+1.07%
2023	2,097	+0.76%

Source: EHESS and INSEE (1968-2023)

=== Education ===
The village has a nursery school and a primary school, both public. Afterwards, pupils go to collège (high-school) at the Collège Lucie-Aubrac in Eyguières. Then, they go to the lycée (high-school) de L'Emperi in Salon-de-Provence.

=== Sports ===
There are many sport associations in the village: tennis, cycling, pétanque, football, gym. Also, one can find a stud farm and a GR footpath, GR n°6.

=== Health ===
There are several doctors and a pharmacy. Not far, in Eyguières, there is a cardiovascular center. The nearest hospital is in Salon-de-Provence.

== Economy ==
=== Agriculture ===
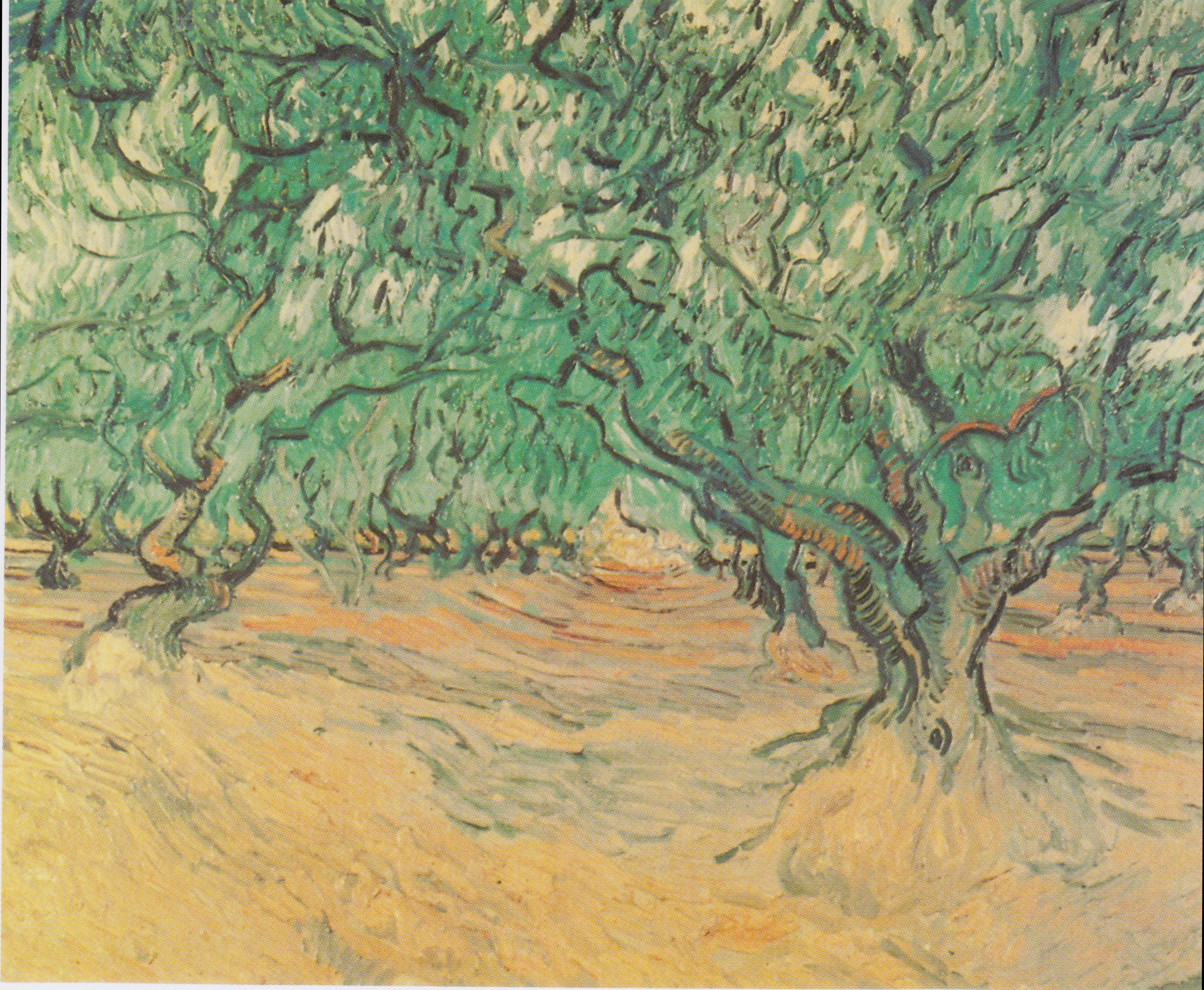
Oliveraie des Alpilles Vincent van Gogh September 1889

The vin de pays des Alpilles is a country wine from the North of Bouches-du-Rhône which is not part of the Appellation d'origine contrôlée label. It was known until 2001 under the name "Vin de pays de la Petite Crau". The production is about 6000 hectolitres per year. Its vineyard lies on a stony soil, delimited by the Durance in the north and the Alpilles in the south.

The village produces an olive oil protected by an AOC label since August 1997. The different olive species used are the salonenque, the beruguette, the grossane and the verdale from the Bouches-du-Rhône.

=== Tourism ===
Around the Alpilles, tourism is declined around three axes: first, the historical and cultural tourism including visits (Les Baux-de-Provence, Glanum, etc.) and festivals, such as the Festival des Alpilles. Secondly, the relaxation tourism, taking advantage of the growing business around guestrooms and hotel trade, with the local animations such as market and artisans. Thirdly, the green tourism around walking trails in the hills.

== Main sights ==
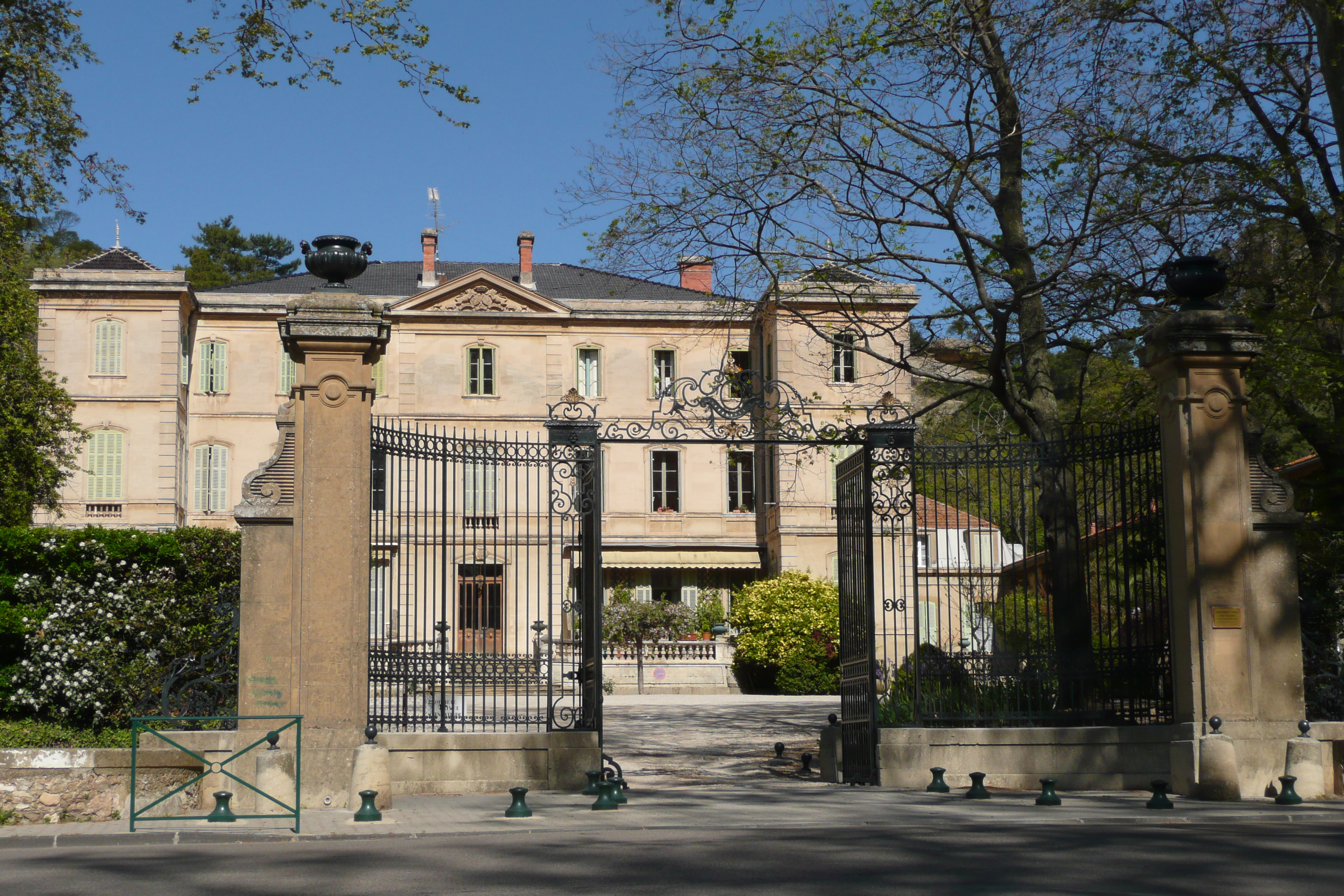
The castle

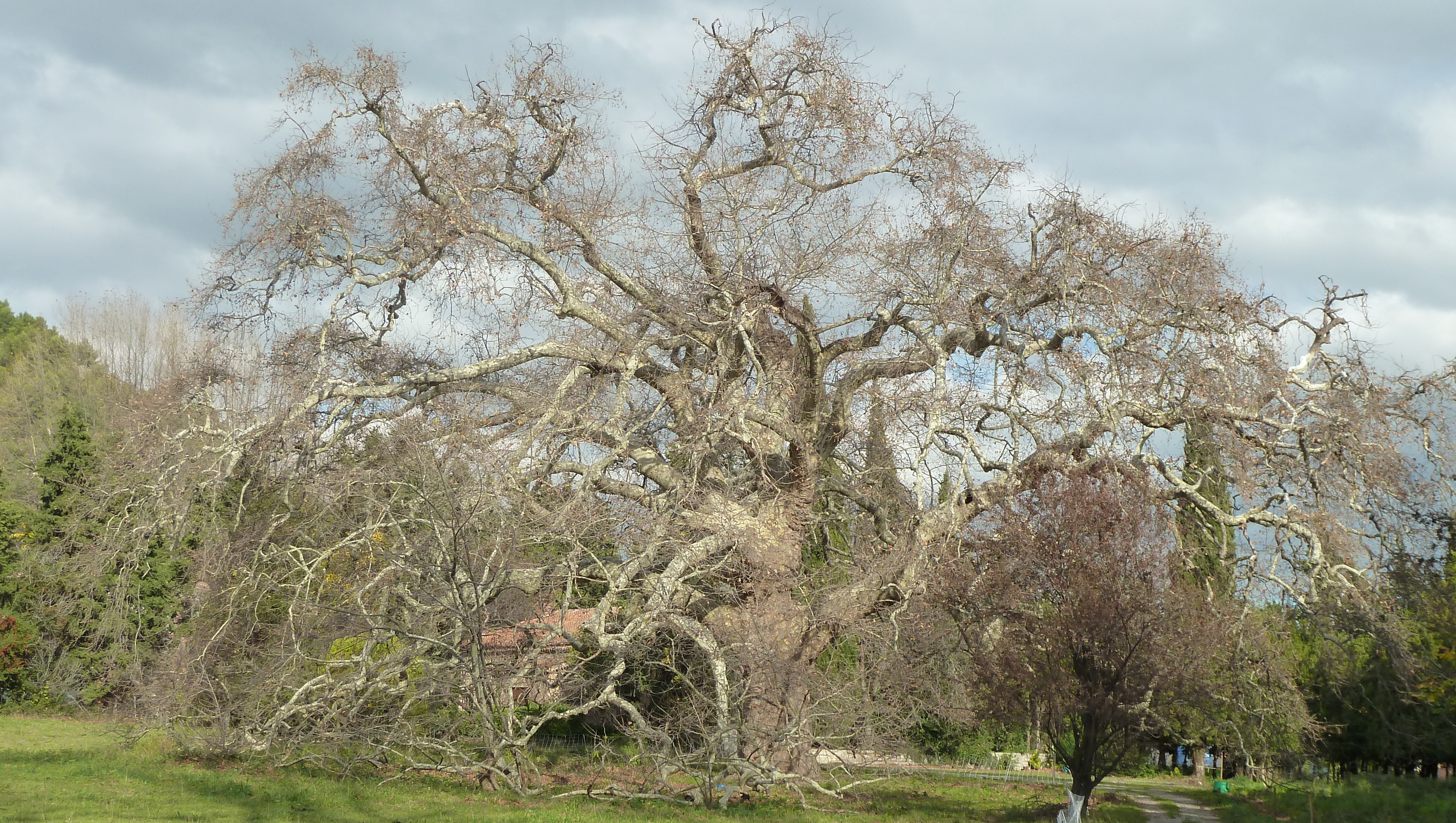
The giant plane tree

- A castle
- The giant plane tree of Lamanon could have been planted by Catherine de Médicis during the 16th century when she came in Salon-de-Provence to meet Nostradamus. The tree was formerly owned by a private individual but he recently donated his land to the village.
- The Calès dwellings. This underground living place is very popular among tourists. Located in a large basin with dozens of dwellings, it is connected to the Saint-Denis chapel, just above a water-spring.

Each year, Lamanon hosts one of the biggest concerts of the festival des Alpilles, the "Lam' du blues", starring big names such as Tony Joe White, Billy Boy Arnold, John Primer, Billy Branch, Lurrie Bell, Louisiana Red or Wes Mackey.

== People ==
- Jean Honoré Robert de Paul de Lamanon, also known as Robert de Lamanon, (1752–1787), a member of the La Pérouse expedition around the world (August 1 – December 11, 1785) and eventually died in it.
- Bertran de Lamanon (1210–1270), provençal troubadour and lord of Lamanon

== See also ==
- Communes of the Bouches-du-Rhône department
