= Mont Gaussier =

Mountain in France

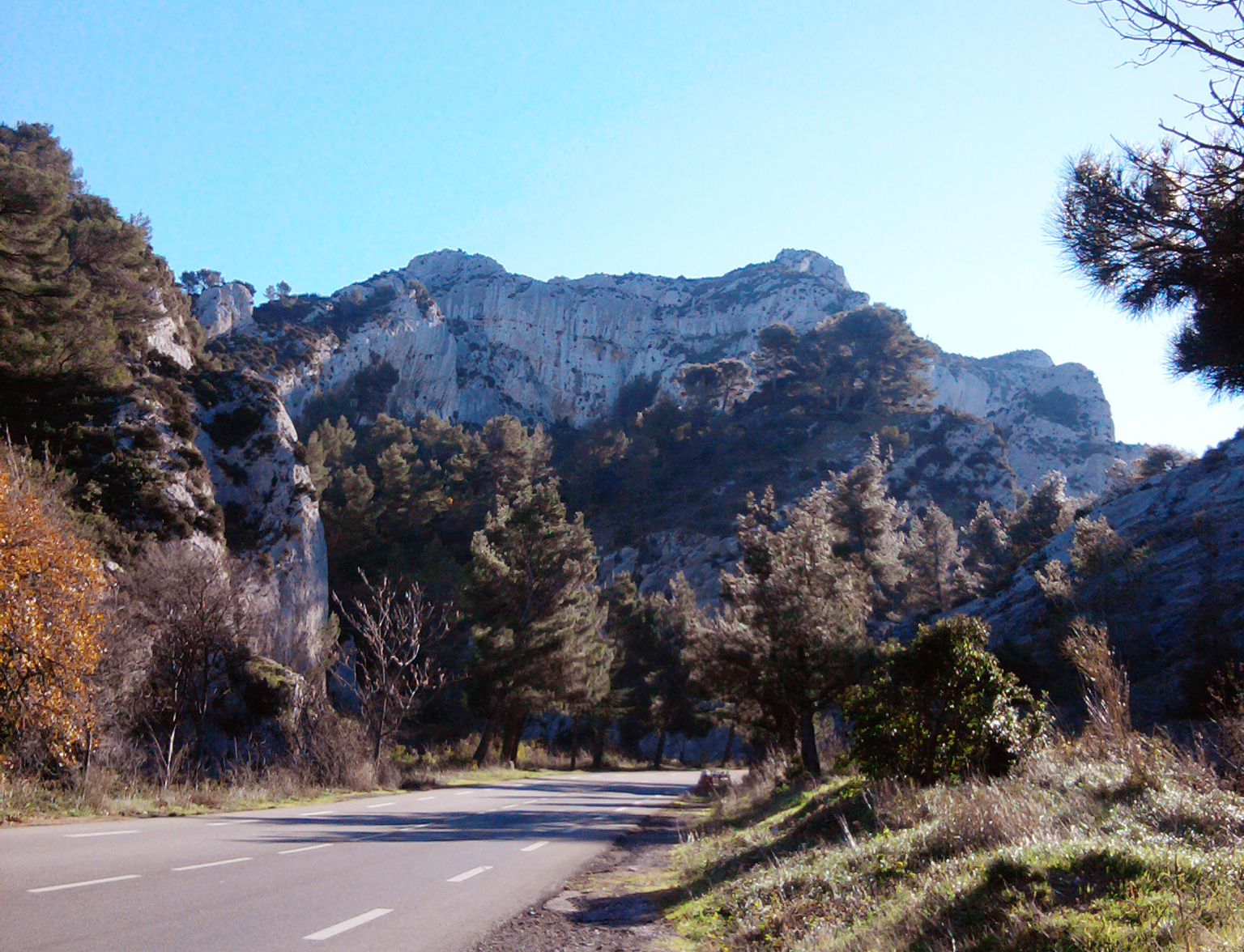
- View of Mont Gaussier

Highest point
- Elevation: 306 m (1,004 ft)
- Coordinates: 43°46′00″N 04°50′13″E

Geography
- Location within France
- Location: Saint-Rémy-de-Provence, Bouches-du-Rhône, France
- Parent range: Alpilles

Geology
- Mountain type: Limestone

Mont Gaussier is a mountain of the Alpilles, located in the southern part of the commune of Saint-Rémy-de-Provence. It is a place of passage for many hikers who cross it via the GR6, Mont Gaussier was very early used as a habitat by protohistoric populations, before seeing a medieval castle at its summit, which has now disappeared.

== Geology ==
Mont Gaussier is made up of crystalline, white, hard limestone. Traces of numerous fossils can be found in the ground. This type of summit is characteristic of the Alpilles, particularly on the north face.

== History ==
The first traces of human habitation on Mont Gaussier can be traced back to ancient times. In 1996, at least three habitation sites dating from Protohistory and Late Antiquity were discovered at the summit and on the slopes. This is what is revealed by the study of rubble stones, tiles, ceramics and amphora shards found on the site. In addition, the base of a wall was identified at the summit.
