= Bertran d'Alamanon =

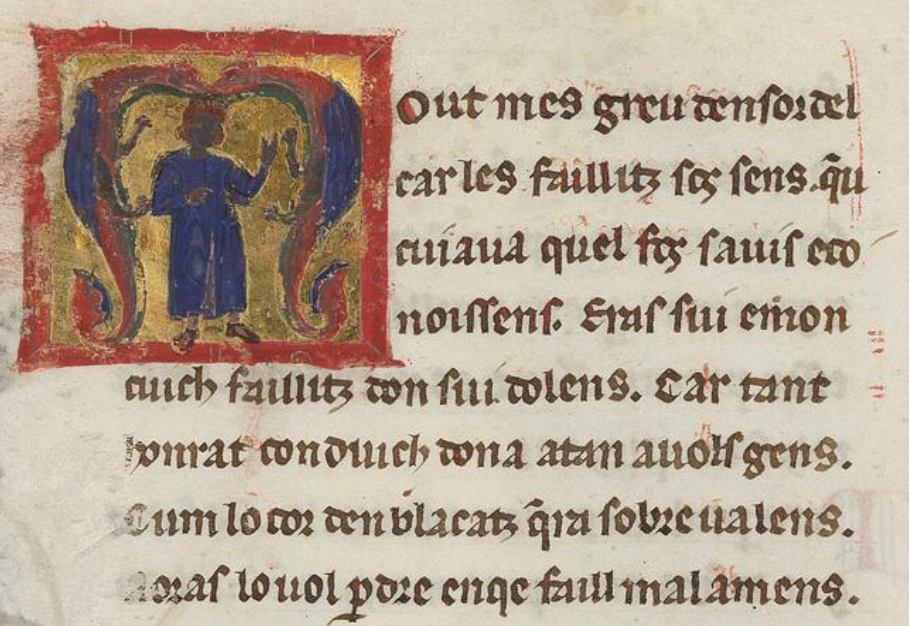
Start of Mout m'es greu d'En Sordel in chansonnier A

Bertran d'Alamanon, also spelled de Lamanon or d'Alamano (fl. 1229–1266), was a Provençal knight and troubadour, and an official, diplomat, and ambassador of the court of the Count of Provence. Twenty-two of his works survive, mainly provocative tensos and sirventes, many dealing with Crusading themes.

== Life ==
Bertran's vida is one of the shortest of the troubadours' at only twenty-seven words in one manuscript:

Bertran de Lamanon si fo de Proensa, fill d'en Pons de Brugeiras. Cortes cavalliers fo e gens parlans, e fetz bonas coblas de solatz e sirventes

Bertran d'Alamanon was from Provence, the son of Lord Pons de Brugières. He was a courtly knight and an eloquent speaker. And he composed good tensos and sirventes.

Among the reliable points in this short biography is that he was from Lamanon, in modern Eyguières. He is described as the son of a lord of Brugières, which could refer to localities in Castres, Uzès, or Toulouse.

Other sources describe him as the son of a Catalan, Ponç de Bruguers, who came to Provence in the late 12th century after Alphonse I of Provence and who received the seignory of Lamanon from the count-king. According to these sources, it is Bertran who took the surname "de Lamanon".

Bertran appears with some frequency in documents of the period, however, so his scant vida is not a major handicap. He is first attested serving Raymond Berengar IV of Provence in 1235. He continued to serve his successor, Charles I, until at least 1260, when he last appears in documents. He is sometimes assumed to have accompanied Charles in 1265 when the latter conquered the Kingdom of Sicily.

On 5 June 1241 at Montpellier he signed the act of divorce of Raymond VII of Toulouse and Sancha, daughter of Alfonso II of Aragon. He was also signatory to the peace treaty of 1262 between Charles I and the city of Marseille. In the same collection of documents that contains the latter is one which shows Bertran and his brother Pons recognising the right of the Bishop of Avignon to land in Beauvezer, for which they owed two oboes or two partridges annually.

== Poetry ==
In an early work of 1233, Bertran criticises the oppressive behaviour of Raymond Berengar towards his Provençal subjects when he has made Crusader vows. In a work of 1247, Charles comes in for criticism for planning to go on Crusade when he ought to be making good his claim on Provence. A similar theme appears in another poem, which criticises Charles for planning to fight Turks and Khwarezmians instead of dealing with Provence. In an undatable work Bertran expresses frustration with his lady and would rather be imprisoned by the "Masmutz" (Masmuda) than by her.

In one sirventes, Bertran complains about life in the Provençal capital of Aix-en-Provence: "I have to think about lawsuits and lawyers in order to draw up notarial acts; then I look out along the road to see if any courier is coming ... And then they tell me 'Get on your horse, you're required in court; you will be fined and you won't be pardoned if the hearing can't go ahead because of you'." In Pos anc nous valc amors, seigner Bertran, Bertran eagerly awaits the arrival of the Antichrist, so that he may possess a lady who is resisting him.

In D'un sirventes mi ven gran voluntate, written after the death of the Emperor Frederick II in 1250 and before 1265, Bertran lambastes the Papacy for intentionally keeping the throne of the Holy Roman Empire vacant to extort money from imperial candidates: as if he owned the Empire. Bertran suggests that the candidates ought to go to battle, for the Church would surely support the stronger—at least until his power began to wane. But all the candidates could do better if they just went on a Crusade to the Holy Land, then the Pope would grant them indulgences, but certainly none of his cash.

One of Bertran's last works was written between the Seventh and Eighth Crusades (1260–1265) and bewails the decline of Christendom in Outremer. Bertran's most famous work is probably Us cavaliers si jazia ("Once a gentleman was lying"), which has been translated into English. Among the other troubadours with whom Bertran composed tensos were Guigon de Cabanas (Vist hai, Bertran, pos no-us uiron mei oill and Amicx Guigo, be.m asaut de ton sen) and Sordello (Bertrans, lo joy de dompnas e d'amia and Mout m'es greu d'En Sordel, car l'es faillitz sos senz). Against Sordello, Bertran believed that the heart should be given only to the noblest ladies and not divided among cowards. Nonetheless, he was following Sordello when he composed a hybrid of a sirventes and a planh.

== List of works ==
- Un sirventes farai ses alegratge
- Qi qe s'esmai ni.s desconort
- De l'arciuesque mi sa bon
- Ja de chantar nulh temps no serai mutz
- Pueis chanson far no m'agensa
- Lo segle m'es camiatz
- De la sal de Proenza.m doill
- D'un sirventes mi ven gran voluntatc
- L'escurgazhar a me fa tan gran feresa
- Tut nos cuzauam ses faillia
- Vist hai, Bertran, pos no-us uiron mei oill
- Amicx Guigo, be.m asaut de ton sen
- Bertrans, lo joy de dompnas e d'amia
- Doas domnas aman dos cavalliers
- Mout m'es greu d'En Sordel, car l'es faillitz sos senz
- Seigner coms, eu.s prec que.m diiatz
- Pos anc no.us ualc amors, senh'en Bertran
- De uos mi rancur, compaire
- Una chanzon dimeia ai talan
- Nuls hom non-deu eser meraveilaz
- S'ieu agues uirat l'escut

== Sources ==
- Aurell, Martin. "Le troubadour Bertran de Lamanon (c. 1210–1270) et les luttes de son temps", Boletín de la Real Academia de Buenas Letras de Barcelona, 1987–1988, p. 121-162.
- Cabré, Miriam. "Italian and Catalan troubadours" (pp. 127–140). The Troubadours: An Introduction. Simon Gaunt and Sarah Kay, edd. Cambridge: Cambridge University Press, 1999. ISBN 0-521-57473-0.
- Chaytor, H. J. The Troubadours. Cambridge: Cambridge University Press, 1912.
- Egan, Margarita, ed. and trans. The Vidas of the Troubadours. New York: Garland, 1984. ISBN 0-8240-9437-9.
- Harvey, Ruth. "Courtly culture in medieval Occitania" (pp. 8–27). The Troubadours: An Introduction. Simon Gaunt and Sarah Kay, edd. Cambridge: Cambridge University Press, 1999. ISBN 0-521-57473-0.
- Salverda de Grave, J. J. Le Troubadour Bertran D' Alamanon. Toulouse, 1902.
- Throop, Palmer A. "Criticism of Papal Crusade Policy in Old French and Provençal." Speculum, Vol. 13, No. 4. (Oct. 1938), pp. 379–412.
