= Maussane-les-Alpilles =

Commune in Provence-Alpes-Côte d'Azur, France

Maussane-les-Alpilles Maussana deis Aupilhas (Occitan)
- Commune
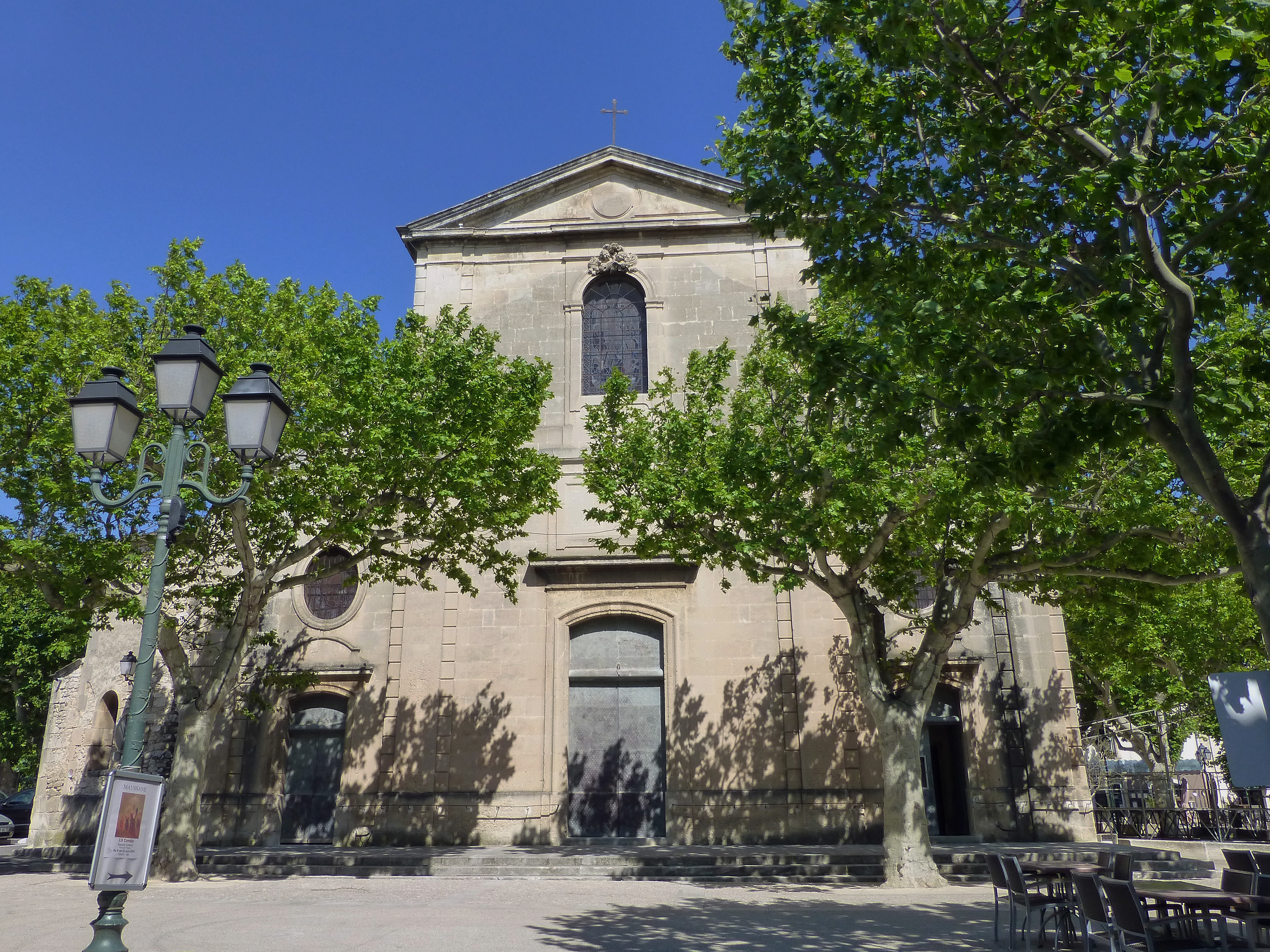
- Sainte-Croix church

- Coat of arms
- Location of Maussane-les-Alpilles
- Location within France Location within Provence-Alpes-Côte d'Azur
- Coordinates: 43°43′18″N 4°48′15″E
- Country: France
- Region: Provence-Alpes-Côte d'Azur
- Department: Bouches-du-Rhône
- Arrondissement: Arles
- Canton: Salon-de-Provence-1
- Intercommunality: Vallée des Baux-Alpilles

Government
  - Mayor (2026–32): Jean-Christophe Carré
- Area^{1}: 31.60 km^{2} (12.20 sq mi)
- Elevation: 40 m (130 ft)
- Highest elevation: 342 m (1,122 ft)
- Lowest elevation: 0 m (0 ft)
- Population (2023): 2,347
  - Density: 74.27/km^{2} (192.4/sq mi)
- Demonym: Maussanais
- Time zone: UTC+01:00 (CET)
  - Summer (DST): UTC+02:00 (CEST)
- INSEE/Postal code: 13058 /13520
- Website: www.maussanelesalpilles.fr
- ^{1} French Land Register data, which excludes lakes, ponds, glaciers > 1 km^{2} (0.386 sq mi or 247 acres) and river estuaries.

Maussane-les-Alpilles (French pronunciation: [mosan le.z‿alpij]; Occitan: Maussana deis Aupilhas; Provençal: Maussano lis Aupiho) is a commune in the Bouches-du-Rhône department in the Provence-Alpes-Cote d'Azur region in Southern France. Part of Alpilles Regional Natural Park, it is located between Saint-Rémy-de-Provence to the north and Saint-Martin-de-Crau to the south.

== Geography ==
The commune of Maussane-les-Alpilles is situated on the southern slopes of the Alpilles in the heart Alpilles Regional Natural Park. It is bound by the rocky ridges and crests of the Entreconque on the north as well as the north rim of the Crau on the south.

== Demographics ==
Historical population

Year	Pop.	±% p.a.
1800	1,435	—
1806	1,372	−0.75%
1821	1,495	+0.57%
1831	1,402	−0.64%
1836	1,417	+0.21%
1841	1,402	−0.21%
1846	1,446	+0.62%
1851	1,545	+1.33%
1856	1,657	+1.41%
1861	1,742	+1.01%
1866	1,773	+0.35%
1872	1,625	−1.44%
1876	1,567	−0.90%
1881	1,541	−0.33%
1886	1,392	−2.01%
1891	1,383	−0.13%
1896	1,372	−0.16%
1901	1,426	+0.78%

Year	Pop.	±% p.a.
1906	1,307	−1.73%
1911	1,356	+0.74%
1921	1,286	−0.53%
1926	1,236	−0.79%
1931	1,171	−1.07%
1936	1,111	−1.05%
1946	1,150	+0.35%
1954	1,153	+0.03%
1962	1,212	+0.63%
1968	1,251	+0.53%
1975	1,352	+1.12%
1982	1,514	+1.63%
1990	1,886	+2.78%
1999	1,968	+0.47%
2007	2,127	+0.98%
2012	2,242	+1.06%
2017	2,289	+0.42%
2023	2,347	+0.42%

Source: EHESS and INSEE (1968–2023)

== See also ==
- Communes of the Bouches-du-Rhône department
