= Canton of Salon-de-Provence-1 =

Coordinates: 43.64°N 5.11°E

- Canton
- Situation of the canton of Salon-de-Provence-1 in the department of Bouches-du-Rhône
- Country: France
- Region: Provence-Alpes-Côte d'Azur
- Department: Bouches-du-Rhône
- No. of communes: {{{nbcomm}}}
- Population (2023): 65,164
- INSEE code: 1326

The canton of Salon-de-Provence-1 is an administrative division of the Bouches-du-Rhône department, in southeastern France. It was created at the French canton reorganisation which came into effect in March 2015. Its seat is in Salon-de-Provence.

It consists of the following communes:

1. Aureille
2. Les Baux-de-Provence
3. Eygalières
4. Eyguières
5. Fontvieille
6. Lamanon
7. Mas-Blanc-des-Alpilles
8. Maussane-les-Alpilles
9. Mouriès
10. Orgon
11. Paradou
12. Saint-Étienne-du-Grès
13. Saint-Rémy-de-Provence
14. Salon-de-Provence (partly)
15. Sénas
