= Mouriès =

Commune in Provence-Alpes-Côte d'Azur, France

- Commune
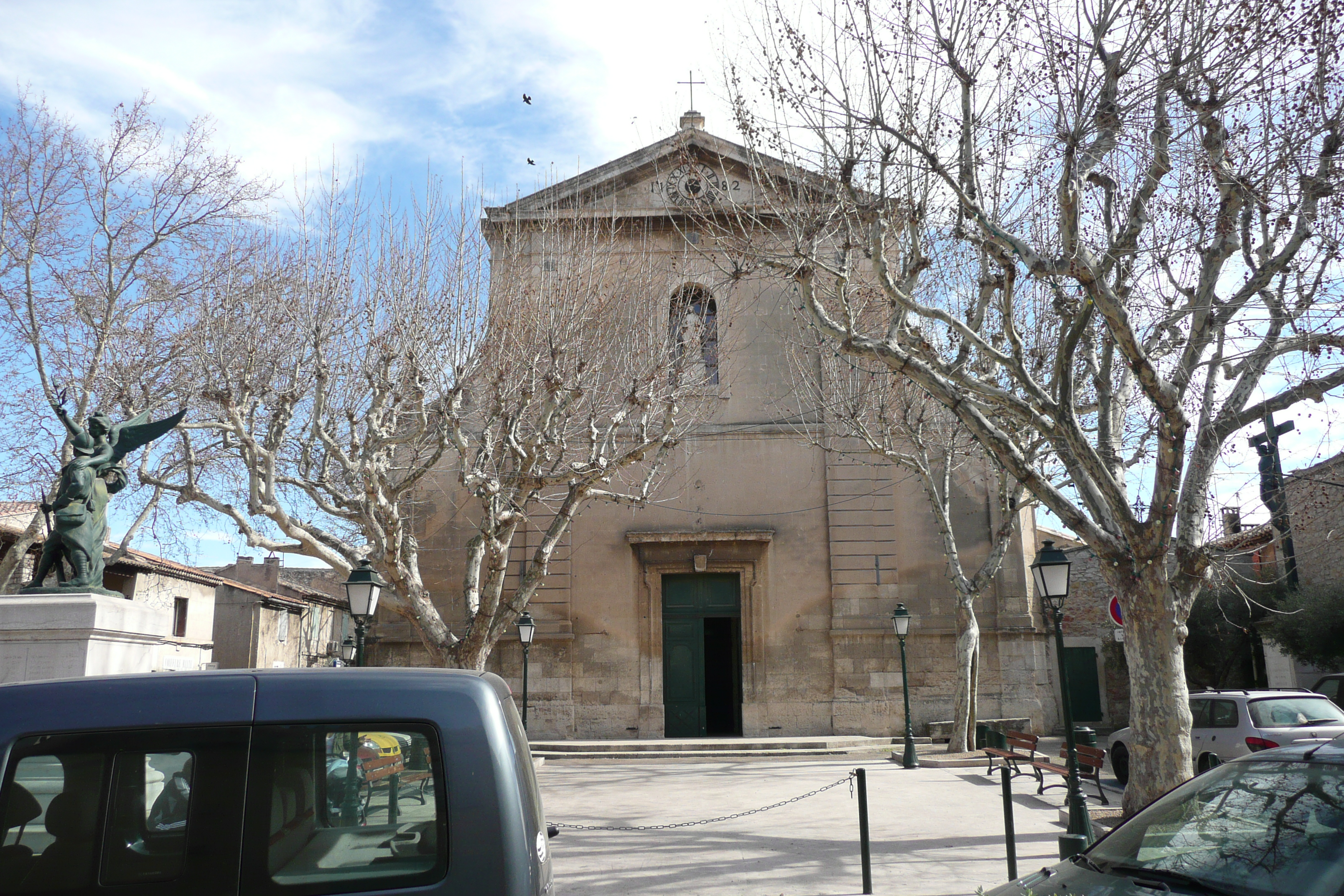
- The church of Mouriès

- Coat of arms
- Location of Mouriès
- Location within France Location within Provence-Alpes-Côte d'Azur
- Coordinates: 43°41′24″N 4°52′18″E
- Country: France
- Region: Provence-Alpes-Côte d'Azur
- Department: Bouches-du-Rhône
- Arrondissement: Arles
- Canton: Salon-de-Provence-1
- Intercommunality: Vallée des Baux-Alpilles

Government
  - Mayor (2026–32): Pascal Vianes
- Area^{1}: 38.35 km^{2} (14.81 sq mi)
- Highest elevation: 280 m (920 ft)
- Lowest elevation: 1 m (3.3 ft)
- Population (2023): 3,527
  - Density: 91.97/km^{2} (238.2/sq mi)
- Time zone: UTC+01:00 (CET)
  - Summer (DST): UTC+02:00 (CEST)
- INSEE/Postal code: 13065 /13890
- ^{1} French Land Register data, which excludes lakes, ponds, glaciers > 1 km^{2} (0.386 sq mi or 247 acres) and river estuaries.

Mouriès (French pronunciation: [muʁjɛs]; Occitan: Moriés, pronounced [muˈɾjes]) is a commune in the Bouches-du-Rhône department in southern France.

== Population ==
Historical population

Year	Pop.	±% p.a.
1800	1,966	—
1806	1,643	−2.95%
1821	1,936	+1.10%
1831	1,789	−0.79%
1836	1,845	+0.62%
1841	1,830	−0.16%
1846	1,890	+0.65%
1851	2,003	+1.17%
1856	2,101	+0.96%
1861	2,163	+0.58%
1866	2,242	+0.72%
1872	2,200	−0.31%
1876	2,060	−1.63%
1881	1,964	−0.95%
1886	1,995	+0.31%
1891	1,690	−3.26%
1896	1,680	−0.12%
1901	1,648	−0.38%

Year	Pop.	±% p.a.
1906	1,500	−1.86%
1911	1,500	+0.00%
1921	1,453	−0.32%
1926	1,417	−0.50%
1931	1,300	−1.71%
1936	1,300	+0.00%
1946	1,307	+0.05%
1954	1,383	+0.71%
1962	1,434	+0.45%
1968	1,631	+2.17%
1975	1,865	+1.93%
1982	2,283	+2.93%
1990	2,505	+1.17%
1999	2,752	+1.05%
2007	3,049	+1.29%
2012	3,484	+2.70%
2017	3,409	−0.43%
2023	3,527	+0.57%

Source: EHESS and INSEE (1968-2023)

== Economy ==
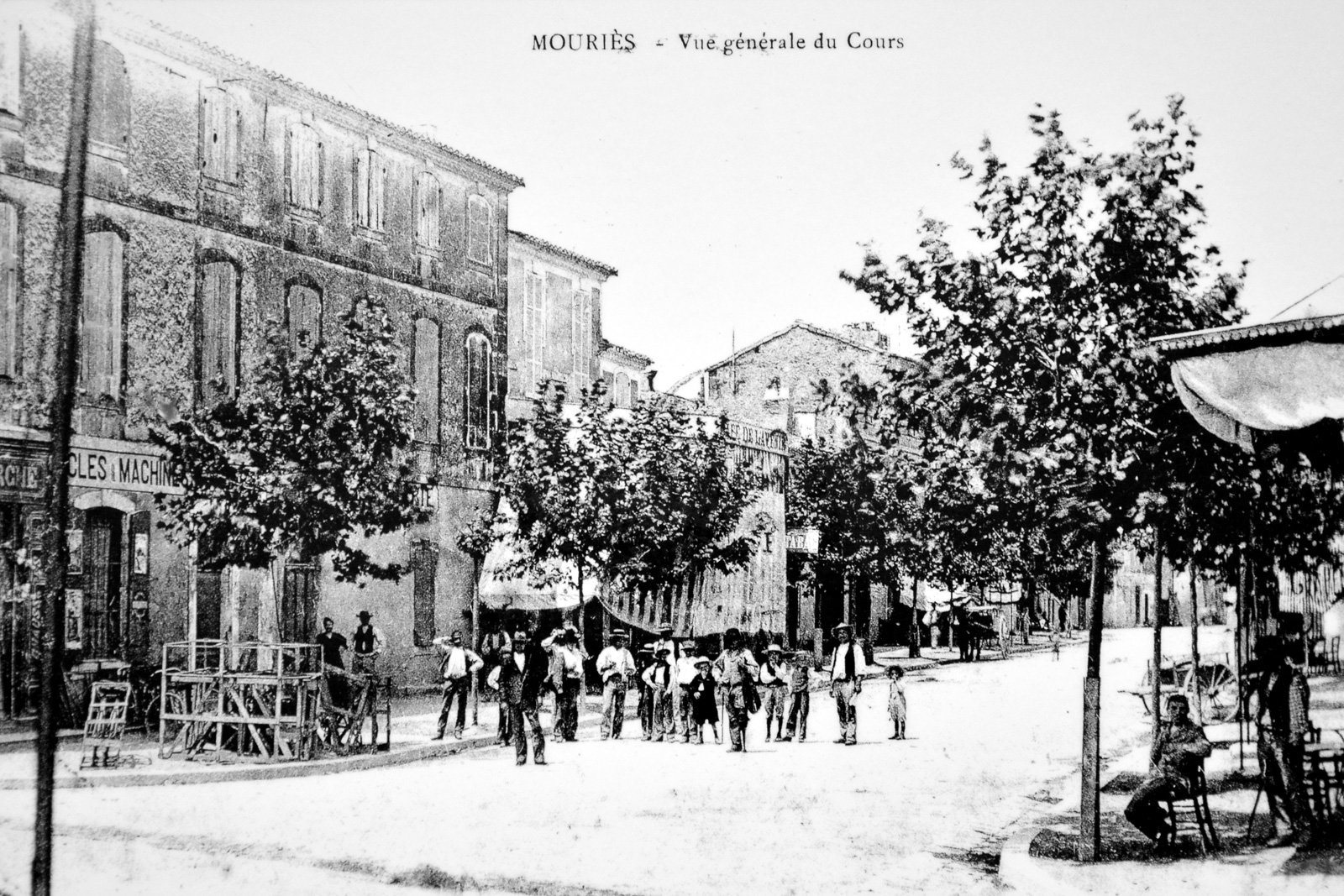
Mouriès in the year 1900. Le Cour (today Cour Paul Revoil)

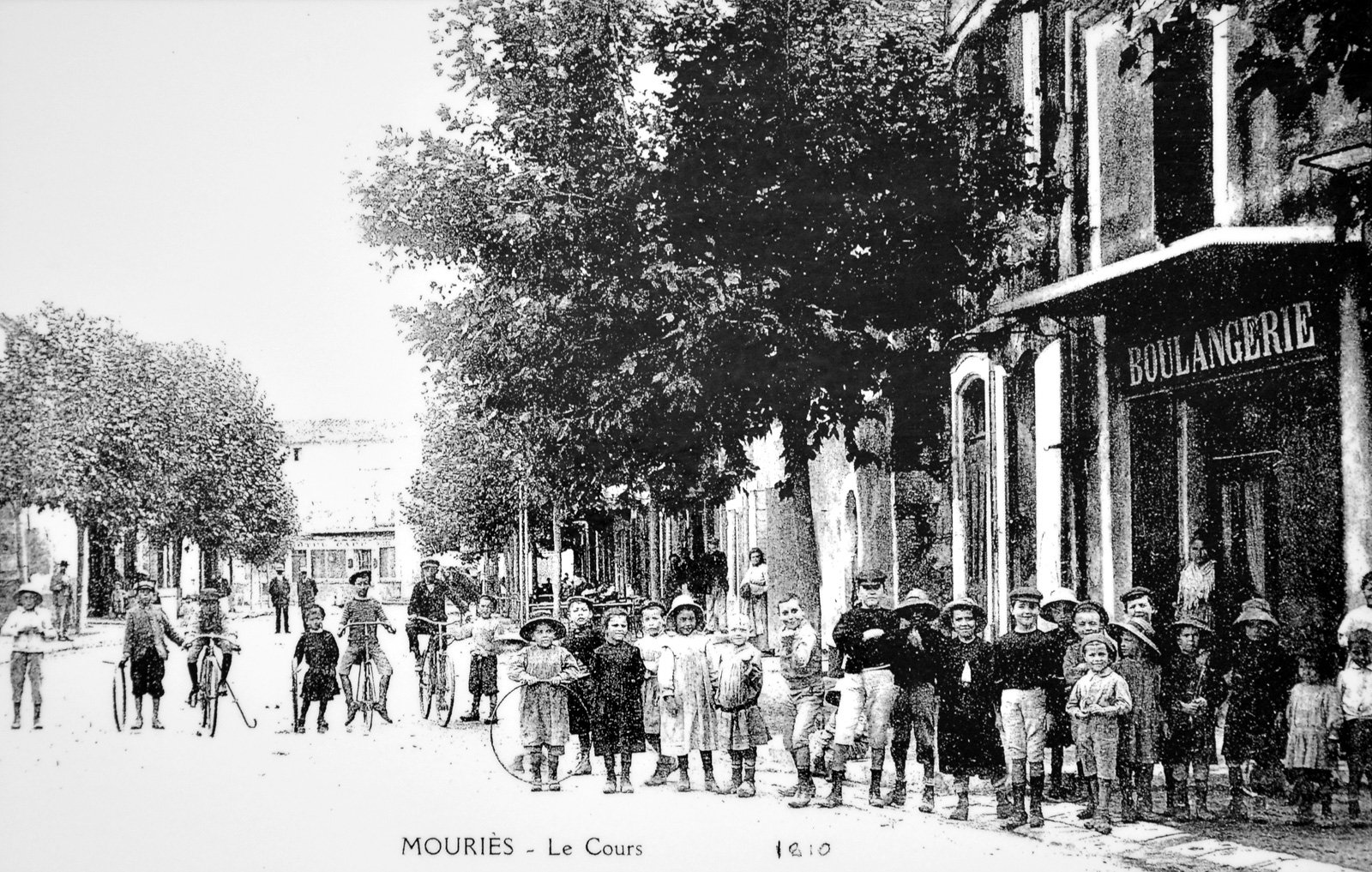
Mouriès in the year 1910. Le Cour (today Cour Paul Revoil)

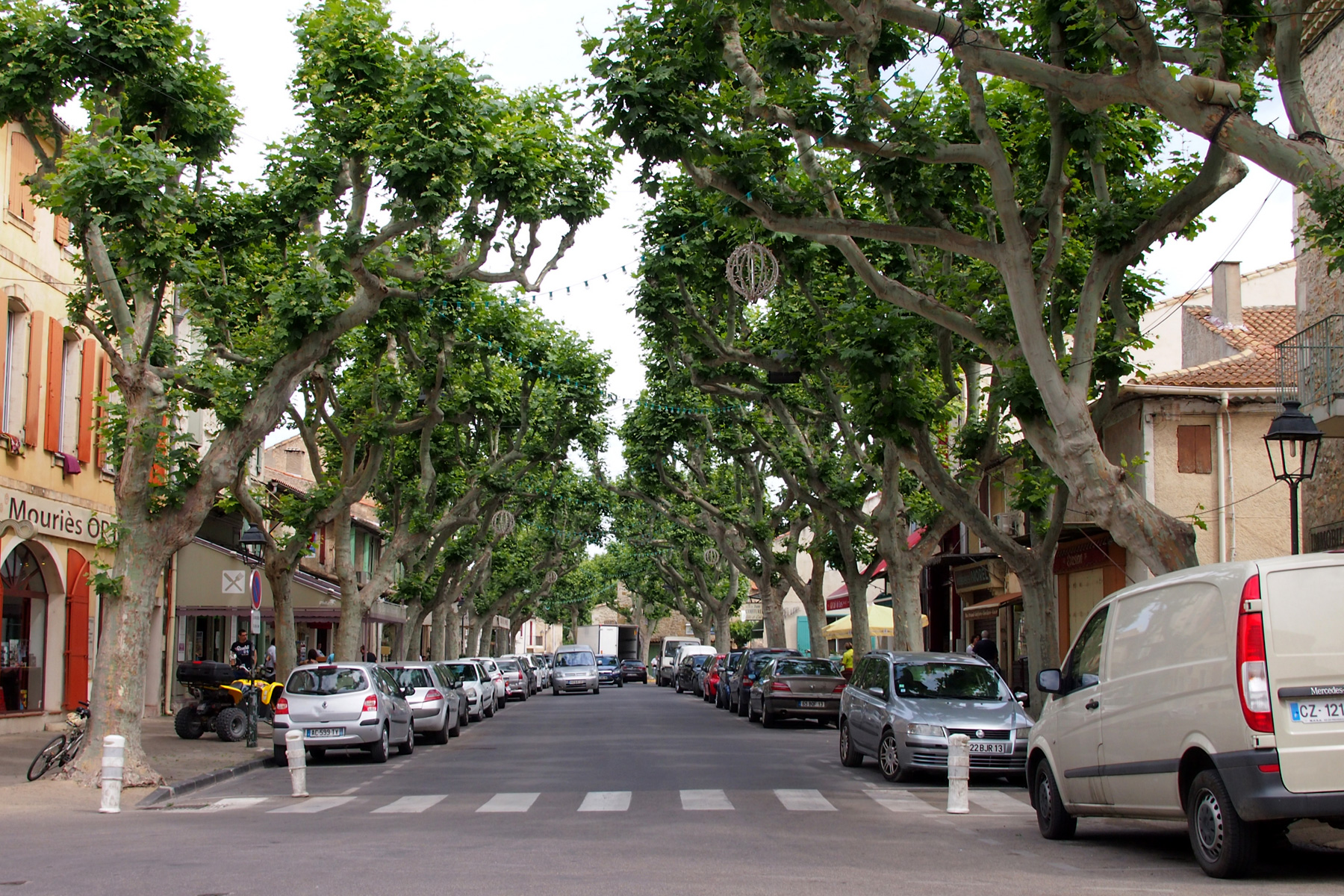
Mouriès in the year 2014, Cour Paul Revoil

Mouriès is known for its olive oil production, calling itself "the olive oil capital of France" (a claim disputed by Nyons, further north). There are still two working olive oil mills in town, including one which allows tours. In December of every year there is a festival celebrating the end of the harvest and the new oil, with a small parade and the benediction of the oil, along with various markets.

Wednesday is market day. The small tourism office in town supplies a list of all of the market days in the area. In winter the market here is much larger than in the other towns in the area (Maussane, Aureille or Eygalières).

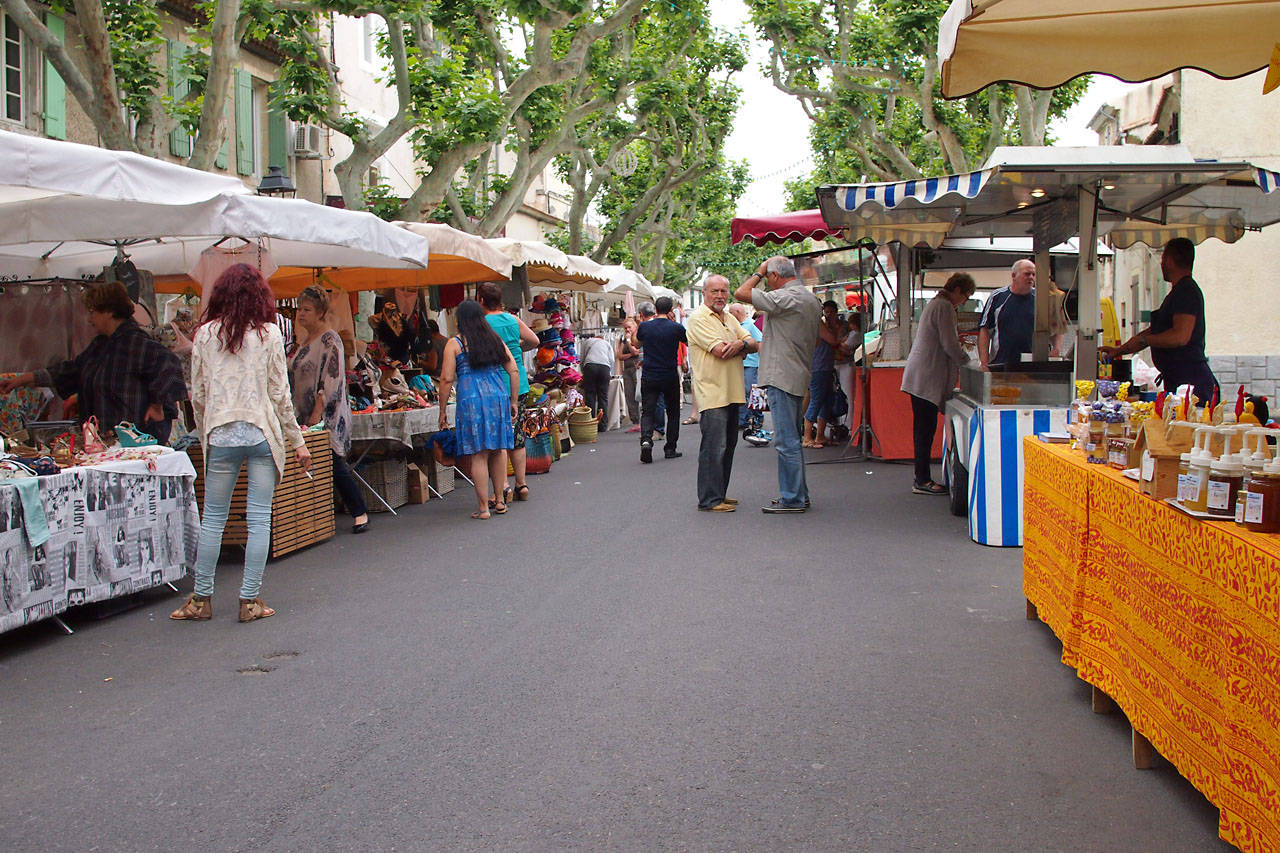
market in Mouriès, Cours Paul Revoil

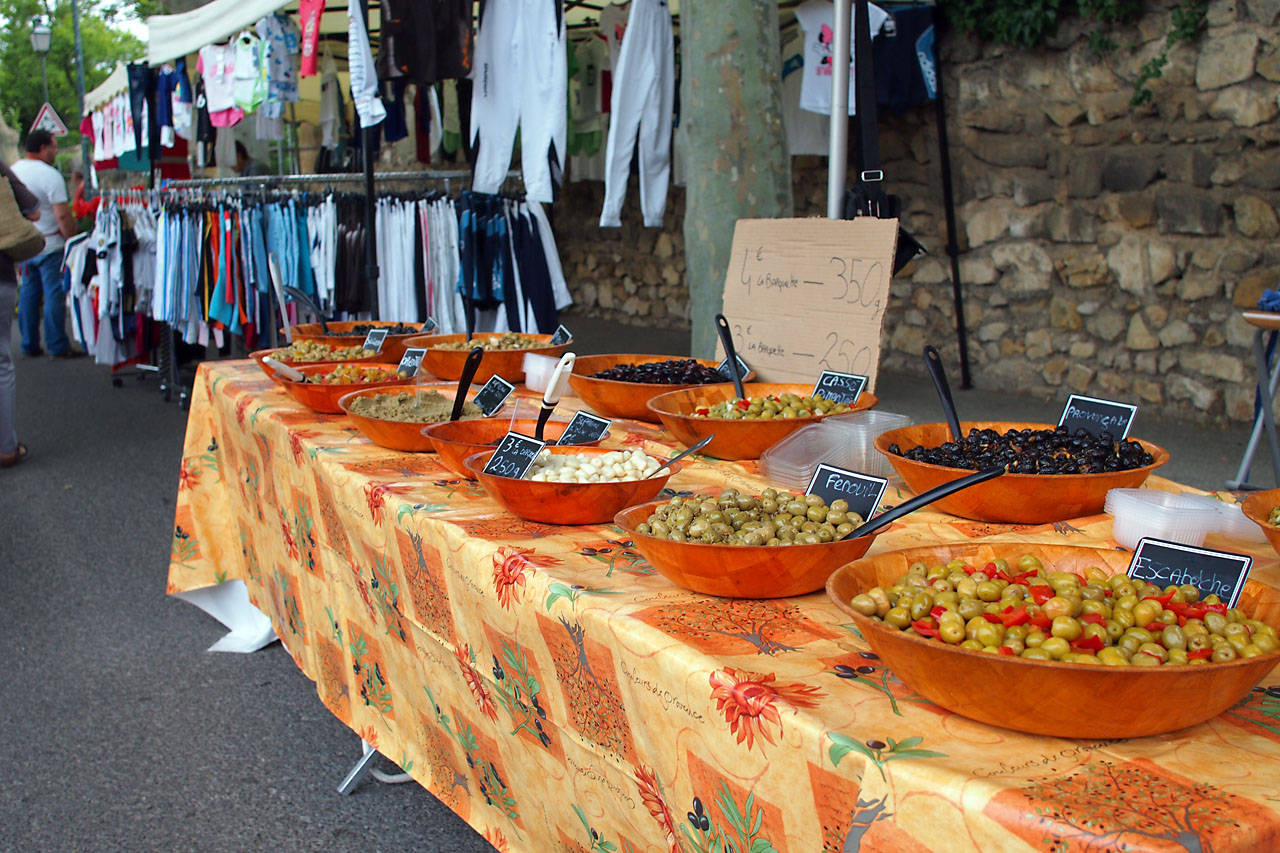
market in Mouriès, Cours Paul Revoil

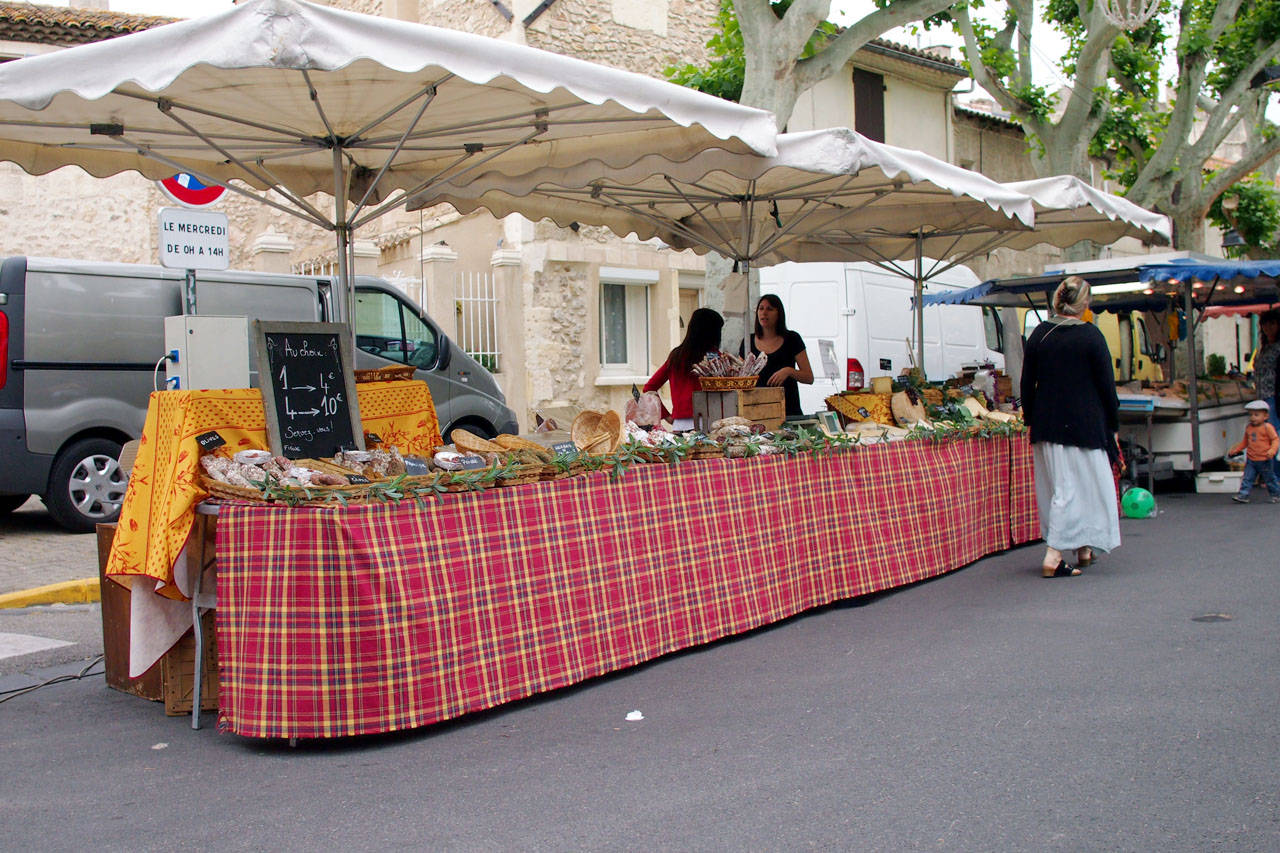
market in Mouriès, Cours Paul Revoil

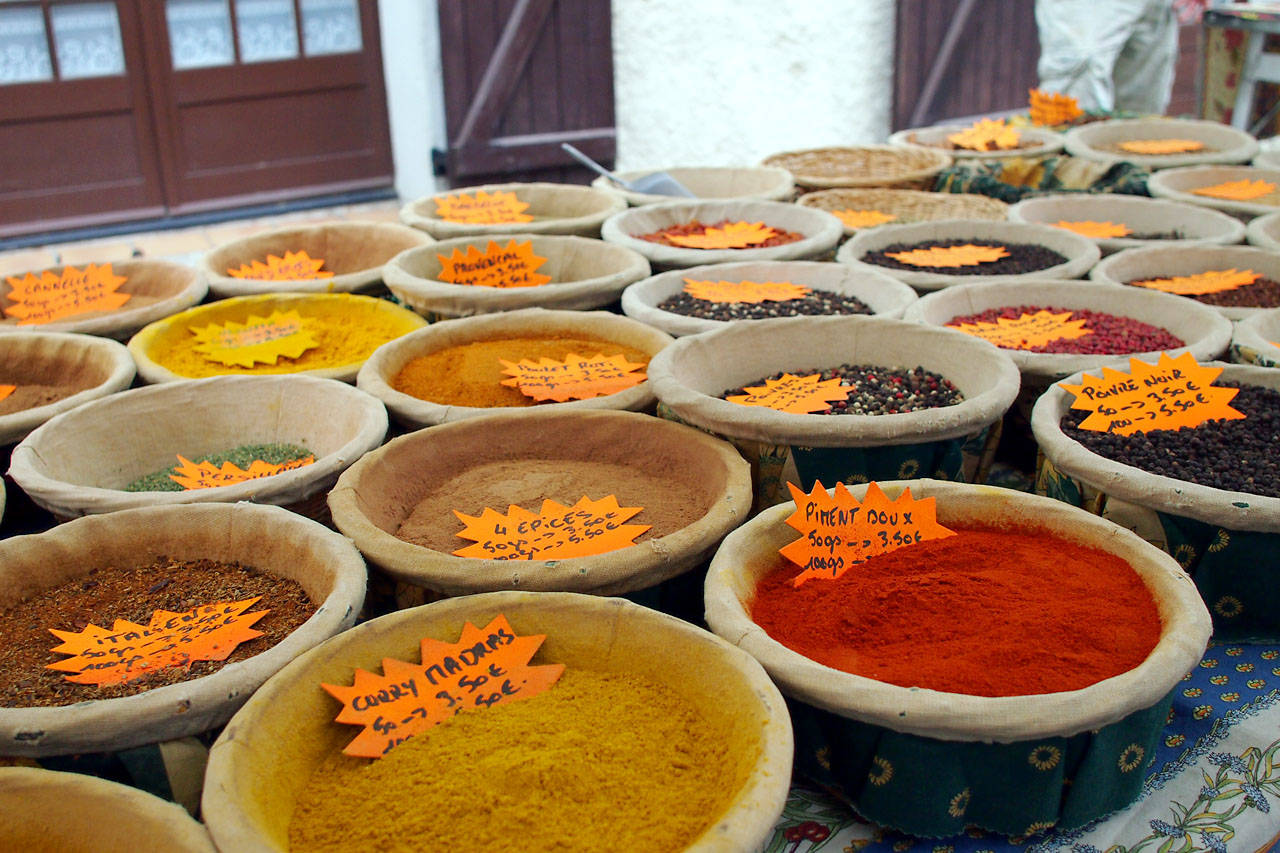
market in Mouriès, Cours Paul Revoil

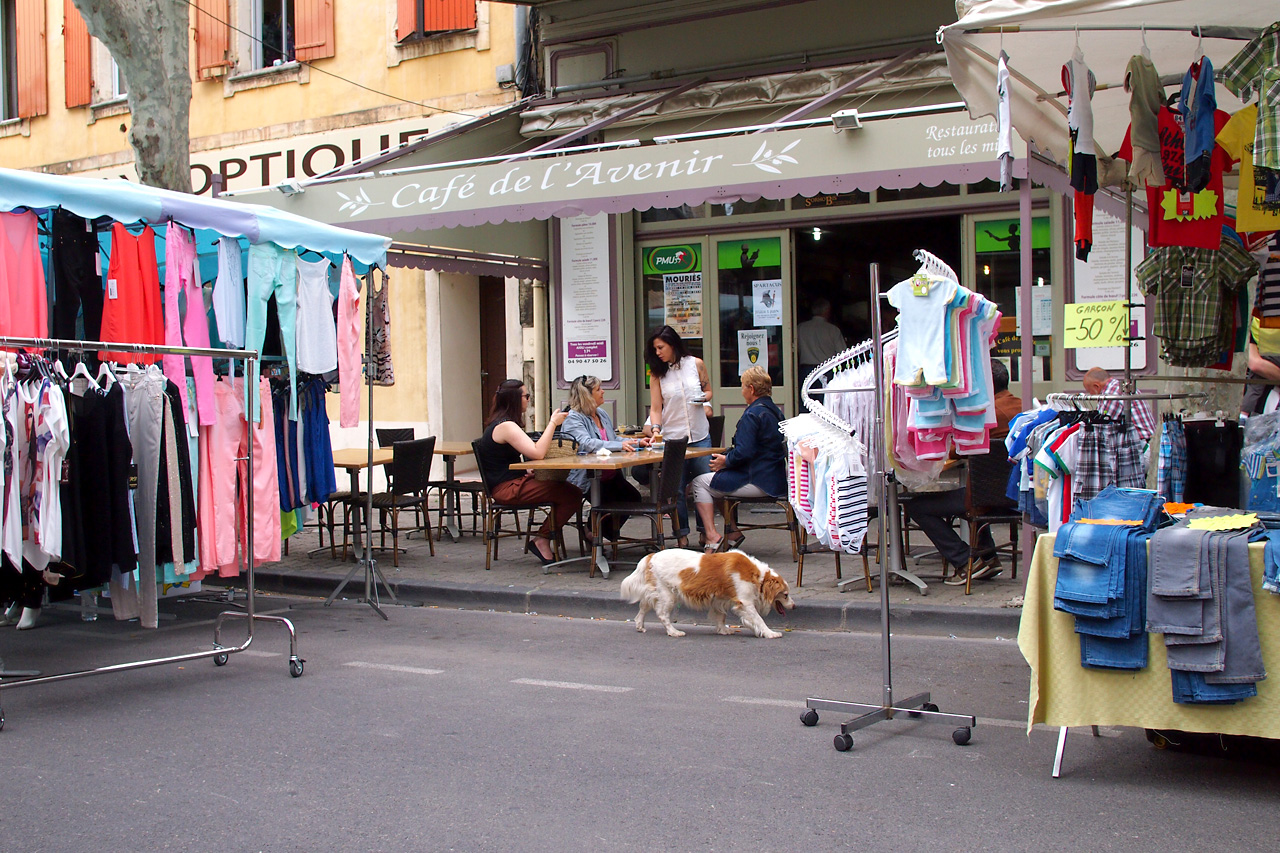
marché dans Mouriès, Cours Paul Revoil, Café de l'Avenir, which has been existing at least since 1900

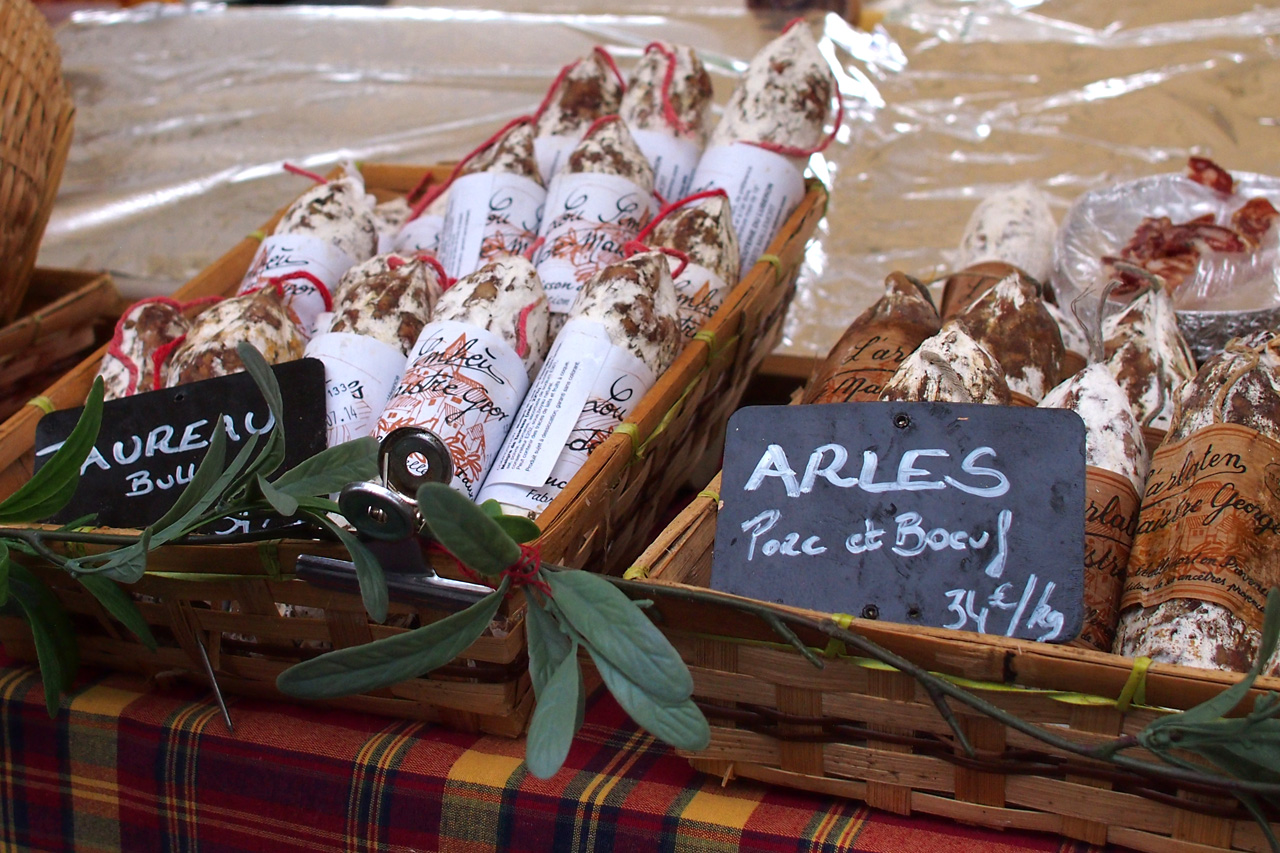
market in Mouriès, Cours Paul Revoil

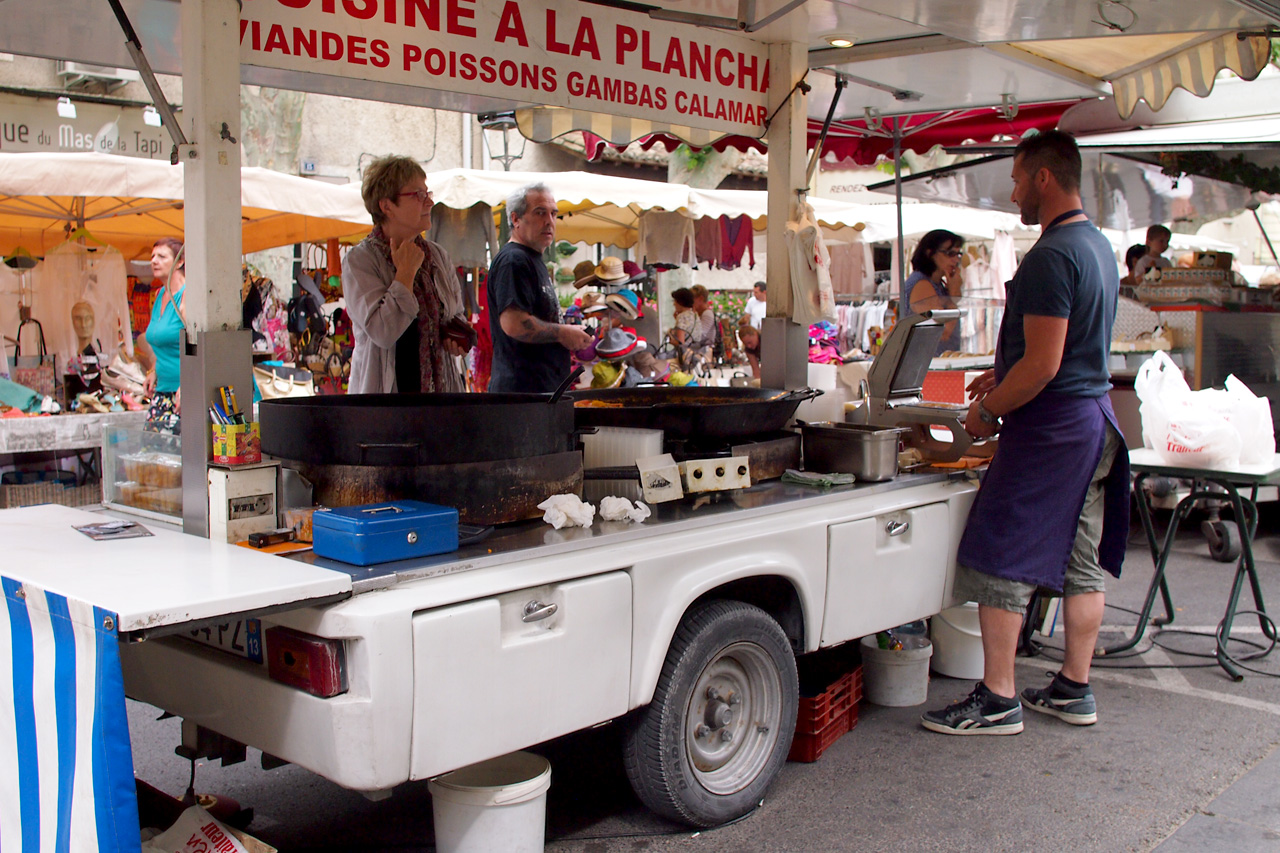
market in Mouriès, Cours Paul Revoil

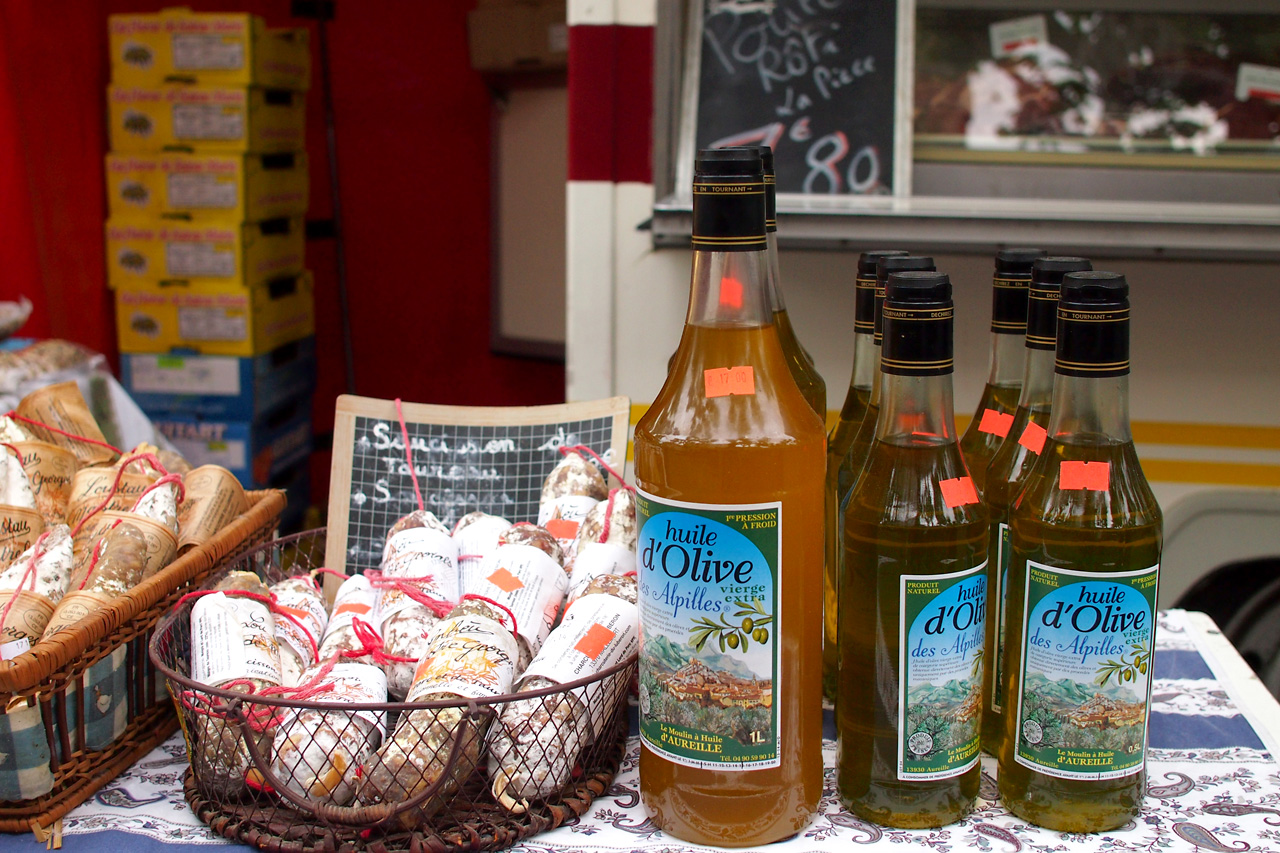
market in Mouriès, Cours Paul Revoil

== Sights ==
The town sits on an old Roman road, and there has been a settlement here since the Celto-Ligurian days. The old oppidum built by the Ligures is still visible on the Caisses de Jean-Jean at the eastern end above the golf course.

== Transportation ==
A bus connects the town with Arles to the west and Salon-de-Provence in the east.

== See also ==
- Alpilles
- Communes of the Bouches-du-Rhône department
