= Alpilles =

Chain of mountains in southern France

Coordinates: 43°45′00″N 4°50′00″E

- Chaîne des Alpilles
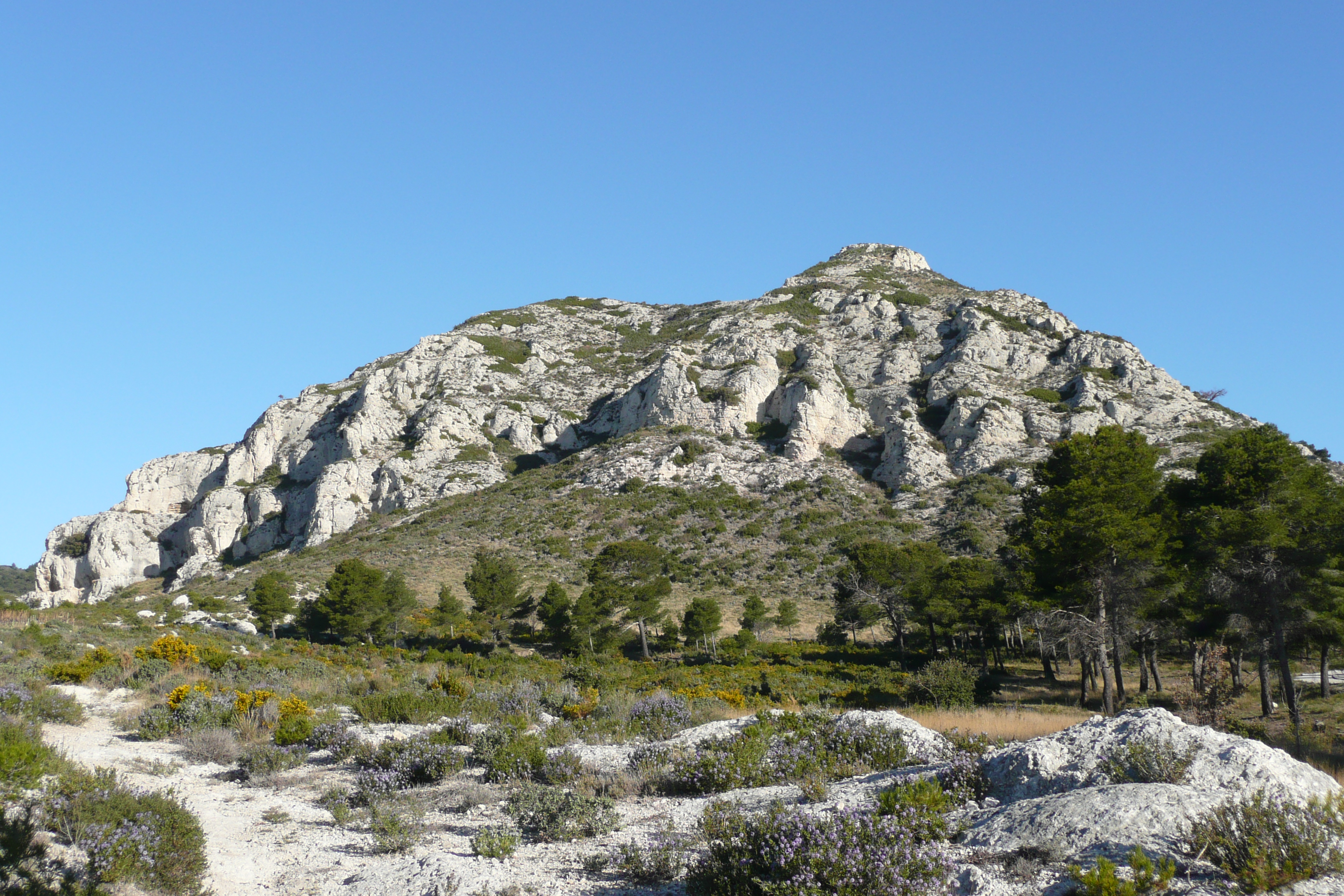
- Alpilles near the town of Maussane-les-Alpilles

Highest point
- Peak: Tour des Opies, Eyguières
- Elevation: 498 m (1,634 ft)

Dimensions
- Length: 25 km (16 mi)
- Width: 8 km (5.0 mi)
- Area: 171 km^{2} (66 mi^{2})

Geography
- Country: France
- Region: Bouches-du-Rhône

The Alpilles (French: chaîne des Alpilles [ʃɛːn dez‿alpij], lit. 'Chain of the Little Alps'; Occitan: cadena dels Alpilhas) is a small range of low mountains in Provence, southern France, located about 20 km (12 mi) south of Avignon.

== Geography ==
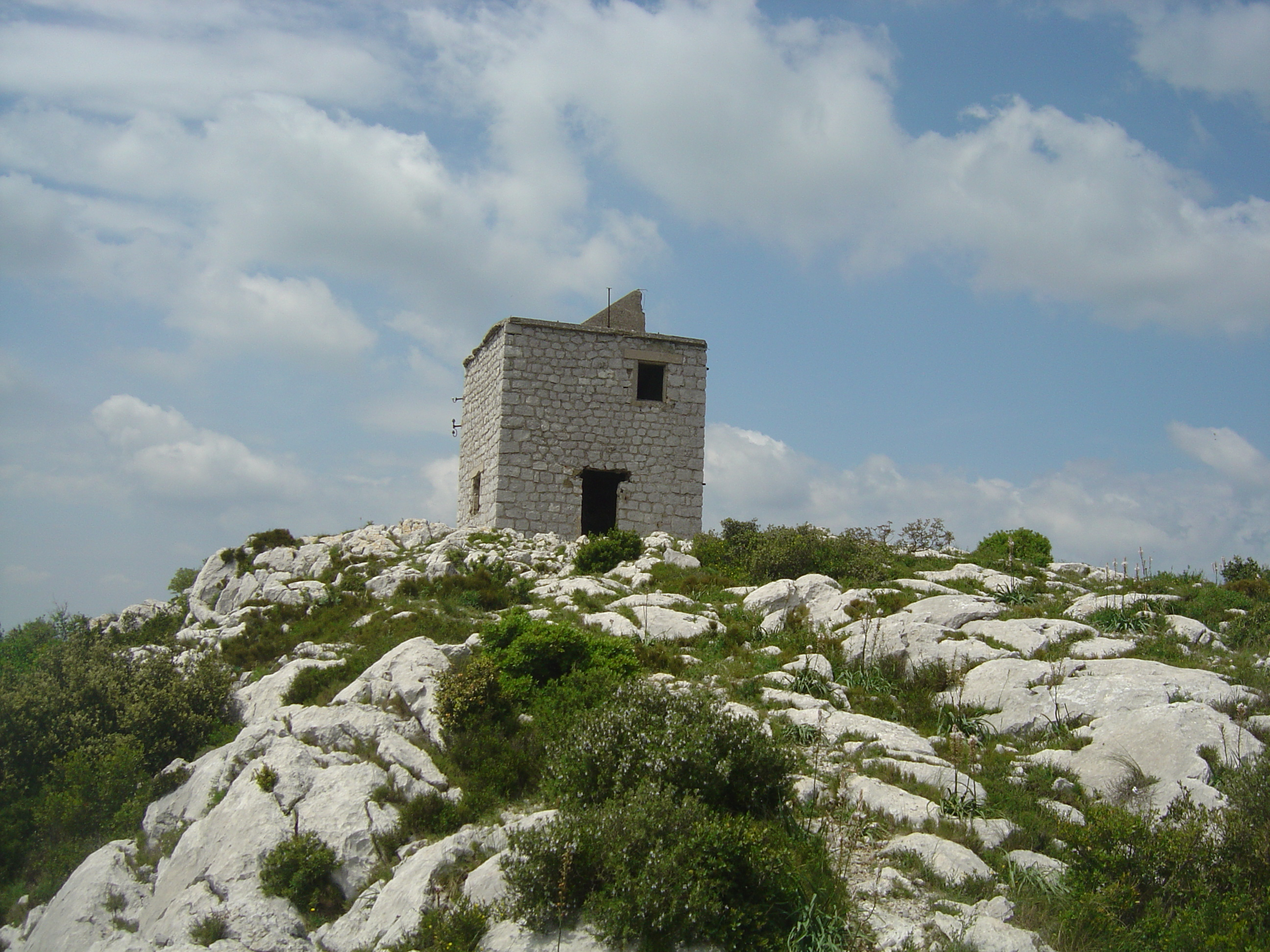
The Tour des Opies stands at the highest point of the Alpilles.

The range is an extension of the much larger Luberon range. Although it is not high – some 498 m (1,634 ft) at its highest point – the Alpilles range stands out impressively, as it rises abruptly from the Rhône valley and from the very flat alluvial plain of Crau. The range is about 25 km long by about 8 to 10 km wide, running in an east–west direction between the Rhône and Durance rivers. The landscape of the Alpilles is one of arid limestone peaks separated by dry valleys.

Topographic map of the Alpilles range.

== Communes ==
The Chaîne des Alpilles is part of the territory of 15 communes: Aureille, Les Baux-de-Provence, Eygalières, Eyguières, Fontvieille, Mas-Blanc-des-Alpilles, Maussane-les-Alpilles, Mouriès, Paradou, Orgon, Saint-Étienne-du-Grès, Saint-Martin-de-Crau, Saint-Rémy-de-Provence, Sénas, Tarascon.

== Flora and fauna ==
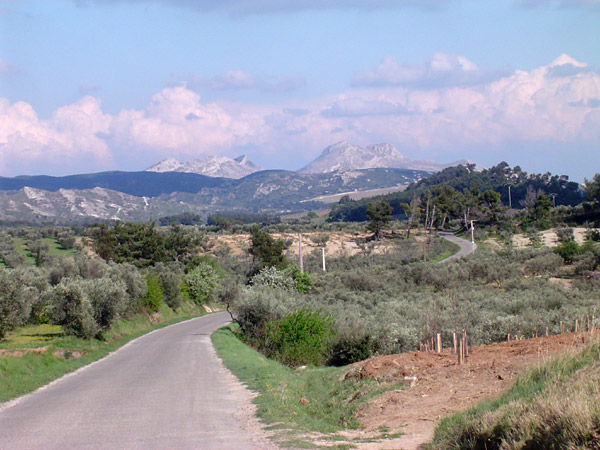
Alpilles landscape near Le Destet. The three types of landscape forms can clearly be seen: cultivated land on the lower slopes, trees on the foothills and bare rock on the peaks.

The lower slopes are planted with olive and almond trees. Kermes oaks and pines also grow there. Much of the range is bare rock or stony ground covered with scrub and maquis.

The highest parts of the range are a nature reserve inhabited by a number of rare species, including Bonelli's eagle, the Egyptian vulture and eagle owl. Some of these species were introduced in the Alpilles in the 1980s.

== History ==
Some protohistorical settlements have been found in the Alpilles. In the very old village of Les Baux de Provence, a cave was used 8000 years ago.

== Conservation ==
The Parc Naturel Régional des Alpilles was created on January 30, 2007. It covers the territory of 16 communes. The area is also under the protection of the Natura 2000 Environmental Protection Plan of the European Union.

== The Alpilles in arts ==
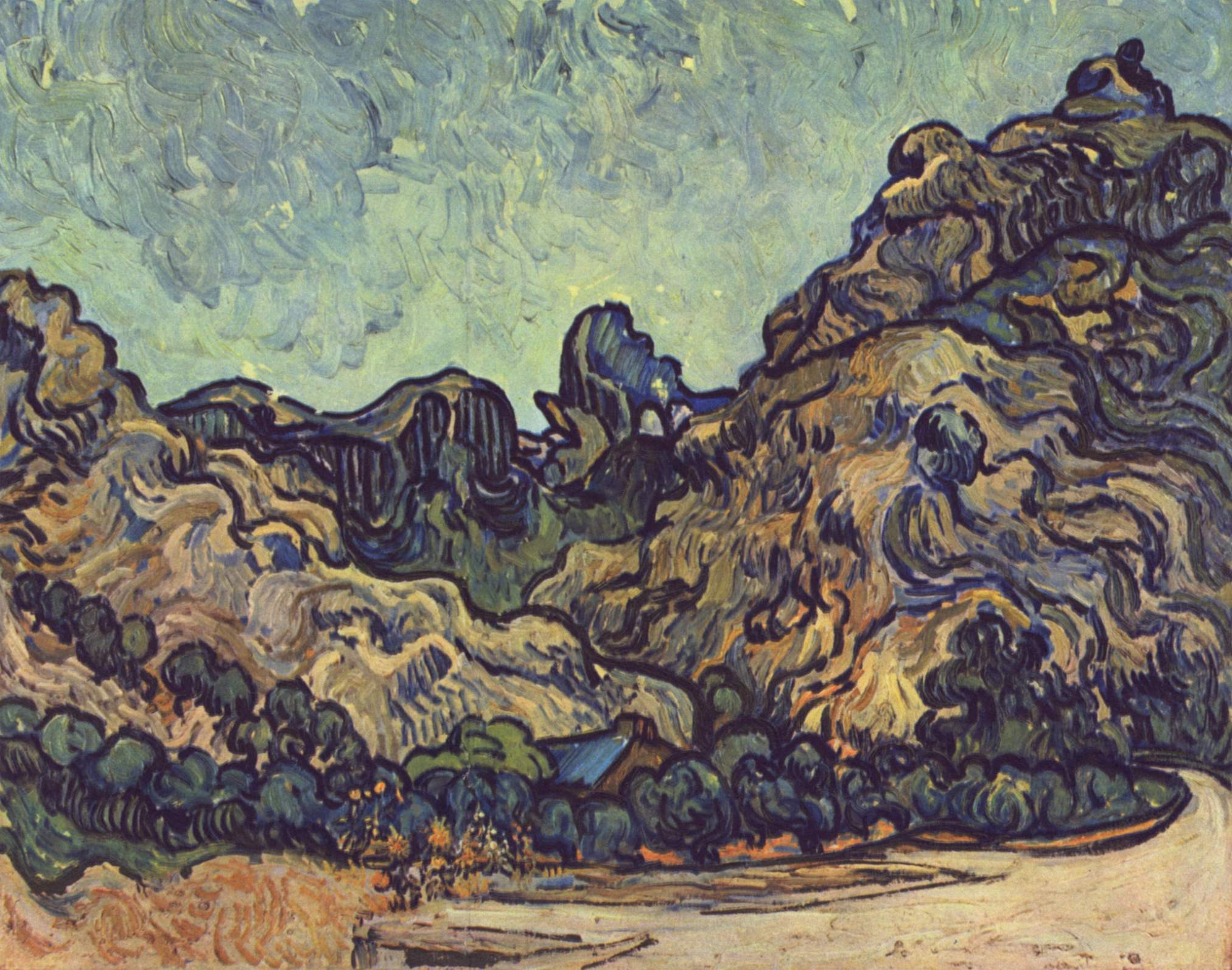
Les Alpilles (1889), painted by Vincent van Gogh while in Saint-Rémy

The Alpilles were immortalized in art by Vincent van Gogh, who painted many images of the Alpilles' landscapes during his time in Saint-Rémy-de-Provence on the north side of the mountains. One of the paintings was given by van Gogh to his friend Eugène Boch.

Alphonse Daudet's 1885 novel Tartarin sur les Alpes, which is a sequel to the 1872 Tartarin de Tarascon, takes place in the Alpilles.

== See also ==
- Barbegal aqueduct and mill
- Glanum
- Vincent Van Gogh paintings:
  - Wheat Fields (Van Gogh series)
  - Saint-Paul Asylum, Saint-Rémy (Van Gogh series)
  - Enclosed Field with Peasant
  - The Starry Night

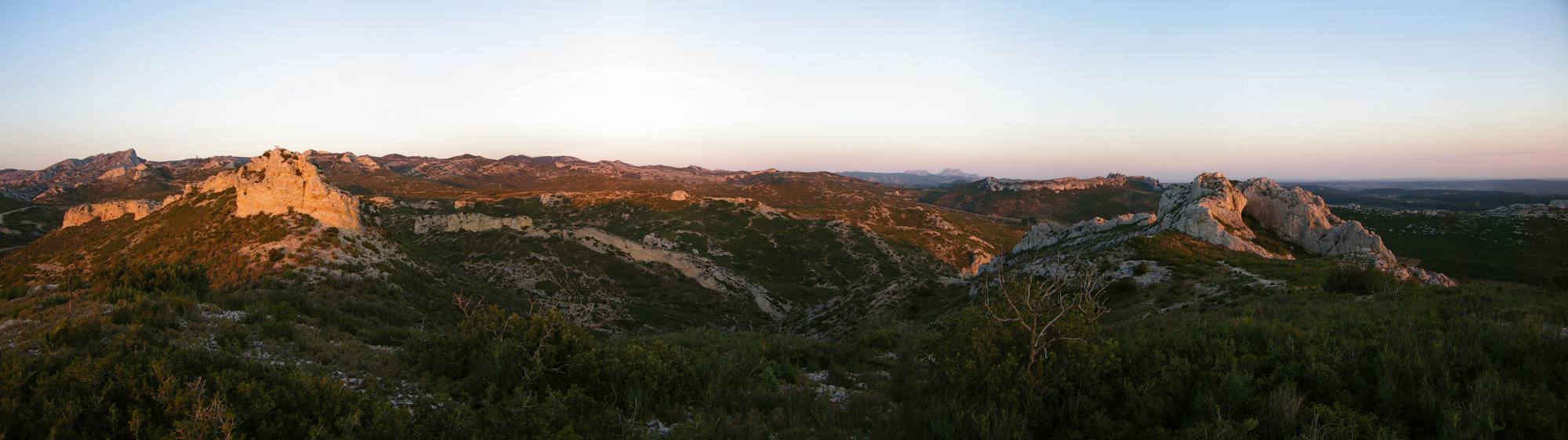
Panorama of the Alpilles
