= Crau =

Former confluence of the Durance and Rhône in France

Coordinates: 43°34′14.93″N 4°51′15.88″E

Approximative limits of Crau's biome area.

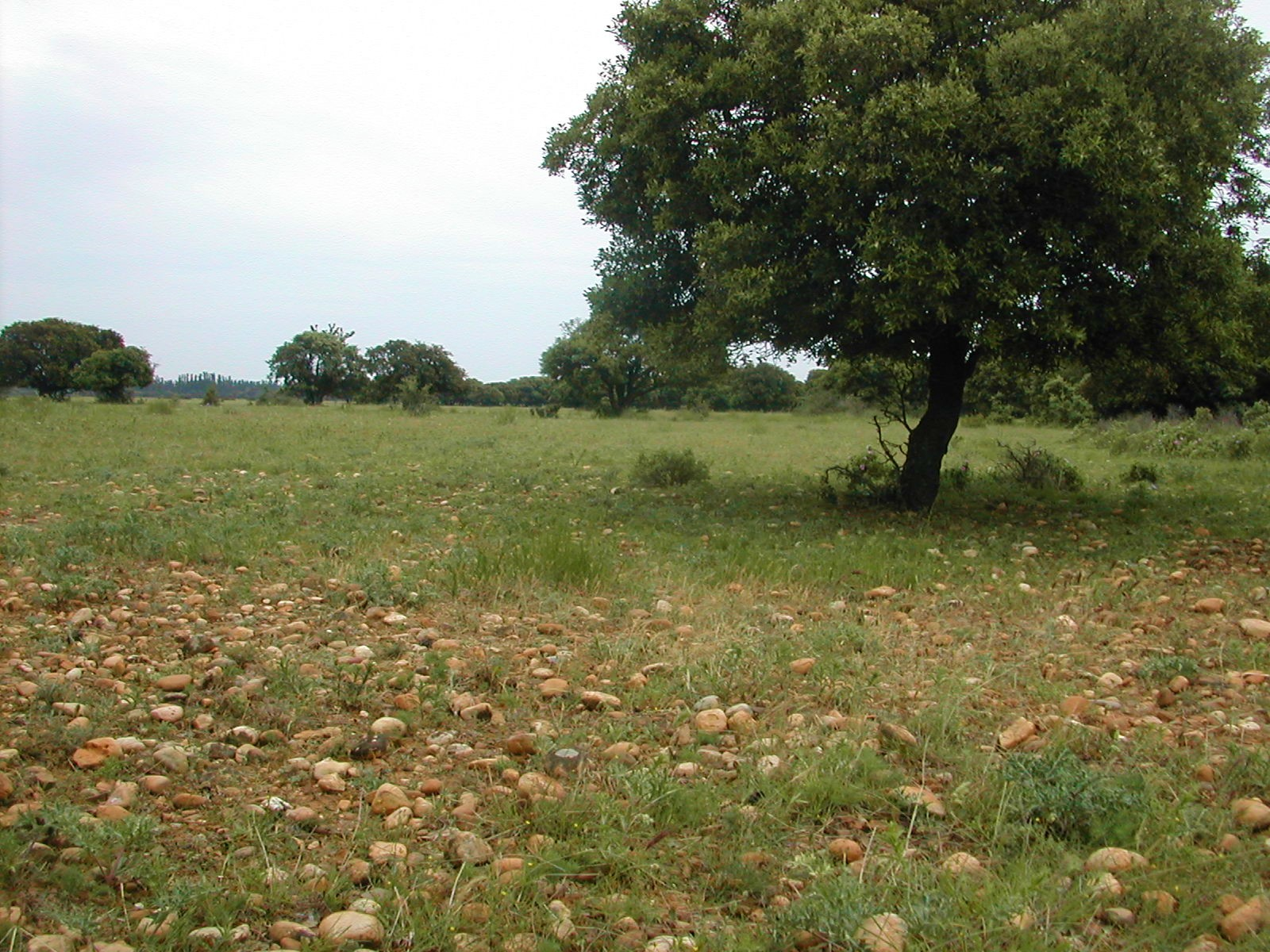
Crau stony plain

The Crau is the ancient confluence of the Durance and Rhône, and constitutes their vast flat alluvial fan.

== Agriculture ==
The Crau is composed of two different parts:

The dry Crau is in the south, and has been used as pasture from Roman times. There are around 100,000 sheep as of 2007, including the Merino sheep.

The wet Crau is in the north and includes the communes of Saint-Martin-de-Crau, Eyguières, Istres, Mouriès, and Arles. It produces the Crau hay, which benefits from an Appellation d’origine contrôlée

== Flora and fauna ==
- Thyme
- Holm oak
- Pin-tailed sandgrouse
- Little bustard
- Lesser kestrel

== History ==
The Crau was described by Strabo as the Stony Plain (Book IV Chapter 1).
