= Sénas =

Commune in Provence-Alpes-Côte d'Azur, France

Sénas Senàs (Occitan)
- Commune
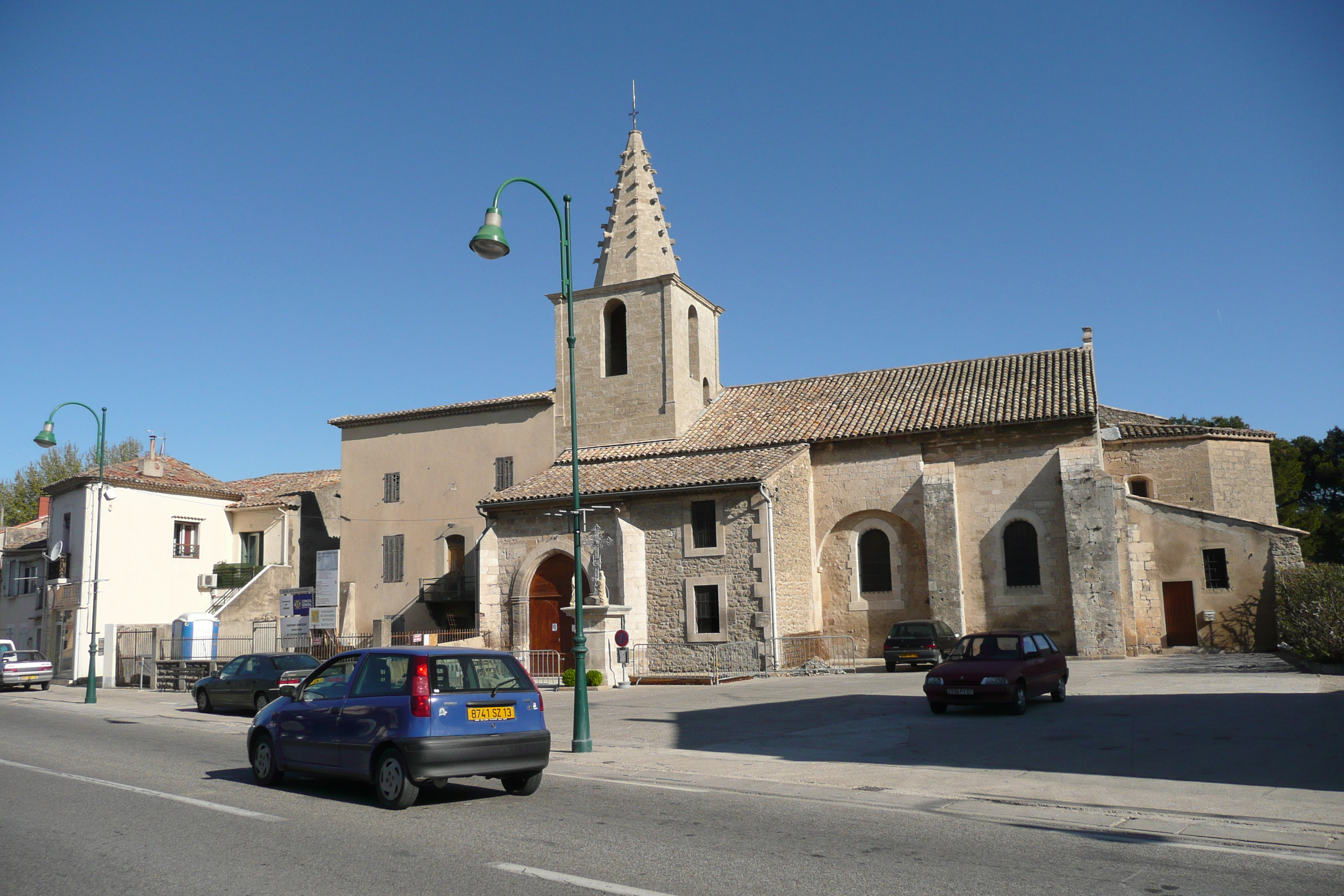
- The church in Sénas

- Coat of arms
- Location of Sénas
- Location within France Location within Provence-Alpes-Côte d'Azur
- Coordinates: 43°44′43″N 5°04′45″E
- Country: France
- Region: Provence-Alpes-Côte d'Azur
- Department: Bouches-du-Rhône
- Arrondissement: Aix-en-Provence
- Canton: Salon-de-Provence-1
- Intercommunality: Aix-Marseille-Provence

Government
  - Mayor (2026–32): Philippe Ginoux
- Area^{1}: 30.61 km^{2} (11.82 sq mi)
- Elevation: 95 m (312 ft)
- Highest elevation: 273 m (896 ft)
- Lowest elevation: 85 m (279 ft)
- Population (2023): 6,925
  - Density: 226.2/km^{2} (585.9/sq mi)
- Time zone: UTC+01:00 (CET)
  - Summer (DST): UTC+02:00 (CEST)
- INSEE/Postal code: 13105 /13560
- ^{1} French Land Register data, which excludes lakes, ponds, glaciers > 1 km^{2} (0.386 sq mi or 247 acres) and river estuaries.

Sénas (French pronunciation: [senas]; Occitan: Senàs) is a commune in the Bouches-du-Rhône department in the Provence-Alpes-Côte d'Azur region in Southern France. Sénas is located on the departmental border with Vaucluse, which follows the river Durance.

== Demographics ==
Historical population

Year	Pop.	±% p.a.
1793	1,350	—
1800	1,015	−3.99%
1806	1,240	+3.39%
1821	1,441	+1.01%
1831	1,491	+0.34%
1836	1,691	+2.55%
1841	1,862	+1.95%
1846	1,873	+0.12%
1851	2,020	+1.52%
1856	2,020	+0.00%
1861	2,080	+0.59%
1866	1,972	−1.06%
1872	1,987	+0.13%
1876	1,914	−0.93%
1881	1,845	−0.73%
1886	1,859	+0.15%
1891	1,800	−0.64%
1896	1,886	+0.94%
1901	2,055	+1.73%

Year	Pop.	±% p.a.
1906	1,924	−1.31%
1911	1,877	−0.49%
1921	1,855	−0.12%
1926	2,027	+1.79%
1931	2,177	+1.44%
1936	2,262	+0.77%
1946	2,281	+0.08%
1954	2,575	+1.53%
1962	2,917	+1.57%
1968	3,008	+0.51%
1975	3,265	+1.18%
1982	3,906	+2.59%
1990	5,113	+3.42%
1999	5,618	+1.05%
2007	6,228	+1.30%
2012	6,770	+1.68%
2017	6,965	+0.57%
2023	6,925	−0.10%

Source: EHESS and INSEE (1968–2023)

== See also ==
- Alpilles
- Communes of the Bouches-du-Rhône department
