= Eyguières =

Commune in Provence-Alpes-Côte d'Azur, France

- Commune
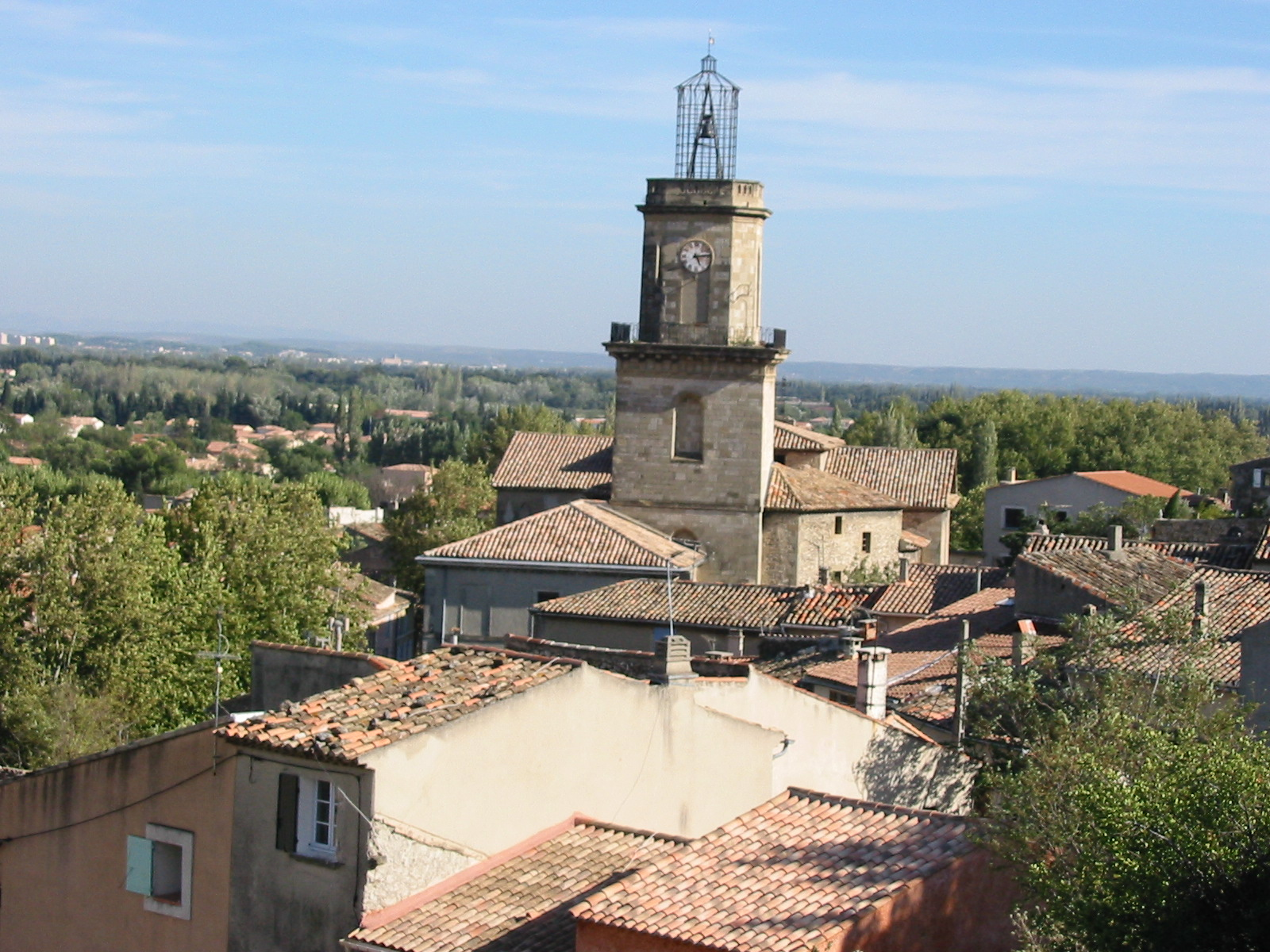
- A general view of the village of Eyguières

- Coat of arms
- Location of Eyguières
- Location within France Location within Provence-Alpes-Côte d'Azur
- Coordinates: 43°41′43″N 5°01′52″E
- Country: France
- Region: Provence-Alpes-Côte d'Azur
- Department: Bouches-du-Rhône
- Arrondissement: Aix-en-Provence
- Canton: Salon-de-Provence-1
- Intercommunality: Aix-Marseille-Provence

Government
  - Mayor (2026–32): Frédéric Durand
- Area^{1}: 68.75 km^{2} (26.54 sq mi)
- Highest elevation: 496 m (1,627 ft)
- Lowest elevation: 63 m (207 ft)
- Population (2023): 7,119
  - Density: 103.5/km^{2} (268.2/sq mi)
- Time zone: UTC+01:00 (CET)
  - Summer (DST): UTC+02:00 (CEST)
- INSEE/Postal code: 13035 /13430
- ^{1} French Land Register data, which excludes lakes, ponds, glaciers > 1 km^{2} (0.386 sq mi or 247 acres) and river estuaries.

Eyguières (French pronunciation: [ɛɡjɛʁ]; Occitan: Aiguiera) is a commune in the Bouches-du-Rhône department in southern France.

== Population ==
Historical population

Year	Pop.	±% p.a.
1793	2,300	—
1800	2,668	+2.14%
1806	2,435	−1.51%
1821	2,925	+1.23%
1831	2,987	+0.21%
1836	2,838	−1.02%
1841	2,920	+0.57%
1846	2,992	+0.49%
1851	2,999	+0.05%
1856	2,935	−0.43%
1861	2,999	+0.43%
1866	3,001	+0.01%
1872	3,246	+1.32%
1876	2,771	−3.88%
1881	2,591	−1.33%
1886	2,678	+0.66%
1891	2,368	−2.43%
1896	2,326	−0.36%
1901	2,333	+0.06%

Year	Pop.	±% p.a.
1906	2,267	−0.57%
1911	2,091	−1.60%
1921	1,946	−0.72%
1926	2,021	+0.76%
1931	1,951	−0.70%
1936	2,005	+0.55%
1946	2,013	+0.04%
1954	2,119	+0.64%
1962	2,450	+1.83%
1968	2,742	+1.89%
1975	3,284	+2.61%
1982	4,171	+3.47%
1990	4,481	+0.90%
1999	5,392	+2.08%
2007	6,331	+2.03%
2012	6,596	+0.82%
2017	7,008	+1.22%
2023	7,119	+0.26%

Source: EHESS and INSEE (1968-2023)

== See also ==
- Alpilles
- Communes of the Bouches-du-Rhône department
