= Barbentane =

Commune in Provence-Alpes-Côte d'Azur, France

- Commune
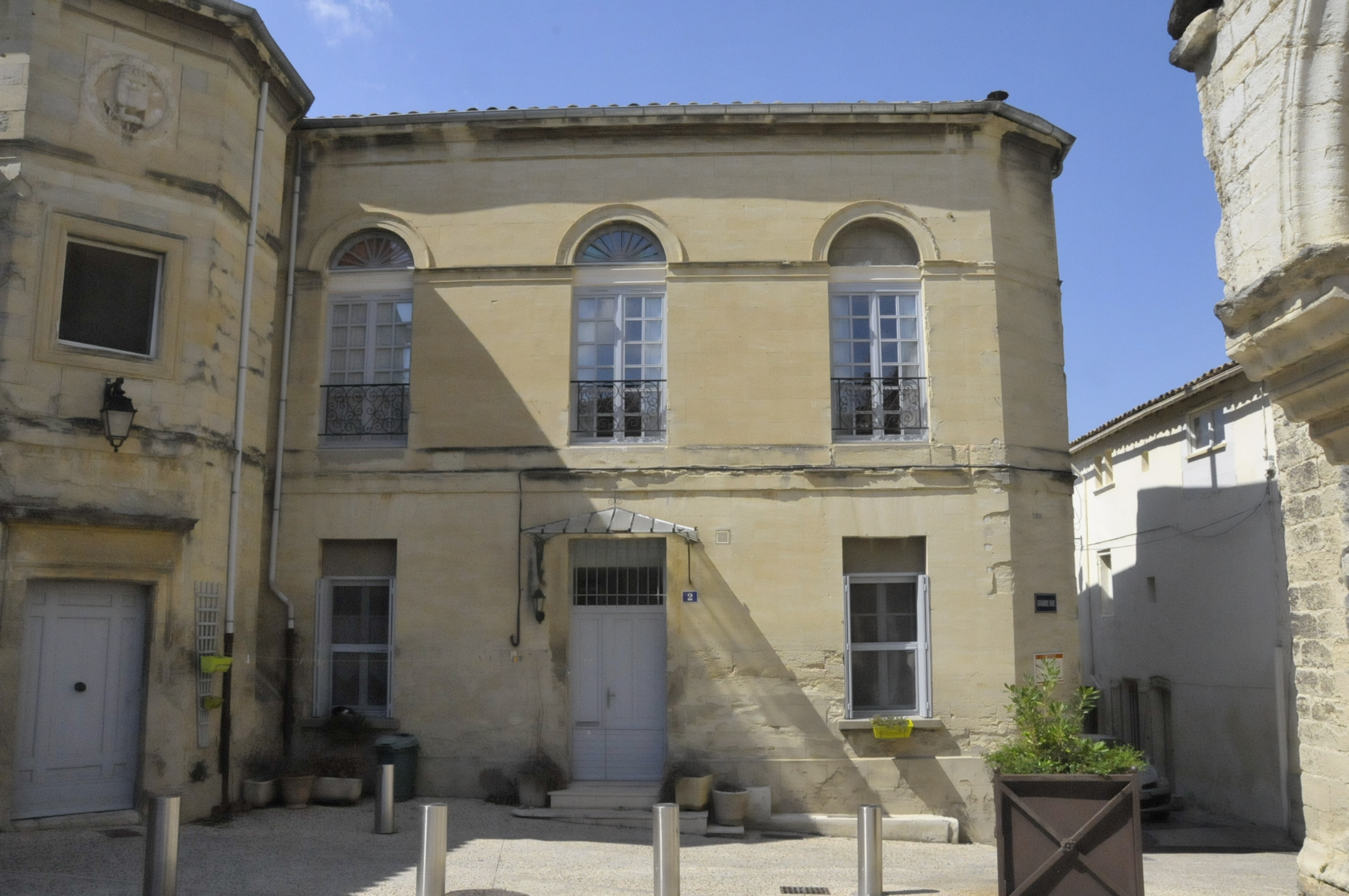
- The old Town Hall

- Coat of arms
- Location of Barbentane
- Location within France Location within Provence-Alpes-Côte d'Azur
- Coordinates: 43°54′01″N 4°44′55″E
- Country: France
- Region: Provence-Alpes-Côte d'Azur
- Department: Bouches-du-Rhône
- Arrondissement: Arles
- Canton: Châteaurenard
- Intercommunality: CA Terre de Provence

Government
  - Mayor (2026–32): Michel Blanc
- Area^{1}: 27.13 km^{2} (10.47 sq mi)
- Elevation: 51 m (167 ft)
- Highest elevation: 167 m (548 ft)
- Lowest elevation: 12 m (39 ft)
- Population (2023): 4,266
  - Density: 157.2/km^{2} (407.3/sq mi)
- Time zone: UTC+01:00 (CET)
  - Summer (DST): UTC+02:00 (CEST)
- INSEE/Postal code: 13010 /13570
- ^{1} French Land Register data, which excludes lakes, ponds, glaciers > 1 km^{2} (0.386 sq mi or 247 acres) and river estuaries.

Barbentane (French pronunciation: [baʁbɑ̃tan]; Provençal: Barbentana) is a commune of the Bouches-du-Rhône department in the Provence-Alpes-Côte d'Azur region of southern France.

== Geography ==
Barbentane is located at the northernmost point of the Bouches-du-Rhône department immediately south-west of Avignon near a rocky plateau and stretching a few kilometres across a flat low area and low hills where the urban area is located. The northern border of the commune is the departmental border between Bouches-du-Rhône and Vaucluse while the western border is the departmental border with Gard.

Access to the commune is by the D35 road from Rognonas in the east, which passes through the commune and the town and continues west, then south-west, to Boulbon. The D570N from Graveson in the south-east passes along the eastern border of the commune then goes east to Rognonas. The D34 goes east from the town to join the D570N. The D77D goes south-east from the town and also joins the D5470N. The D35E goes south from the village to join the D81 in the south. The main railway line from Avignon to the south passes through the east of the commune with the Barbentane-Rognonas Station east of the town. Apart from the town there are also the districts of La Chinquine, Carrière, Le Grand Roumette, Cambageon, Fontgisclar, La Bruyère, Bragalance, and Mas de Basette. The slopes in the south of the commune are forested while the rest of the commune is mostly farmland, with an urban area containing a significantly sized town at the base of the slopes.

=== Hydrography ===
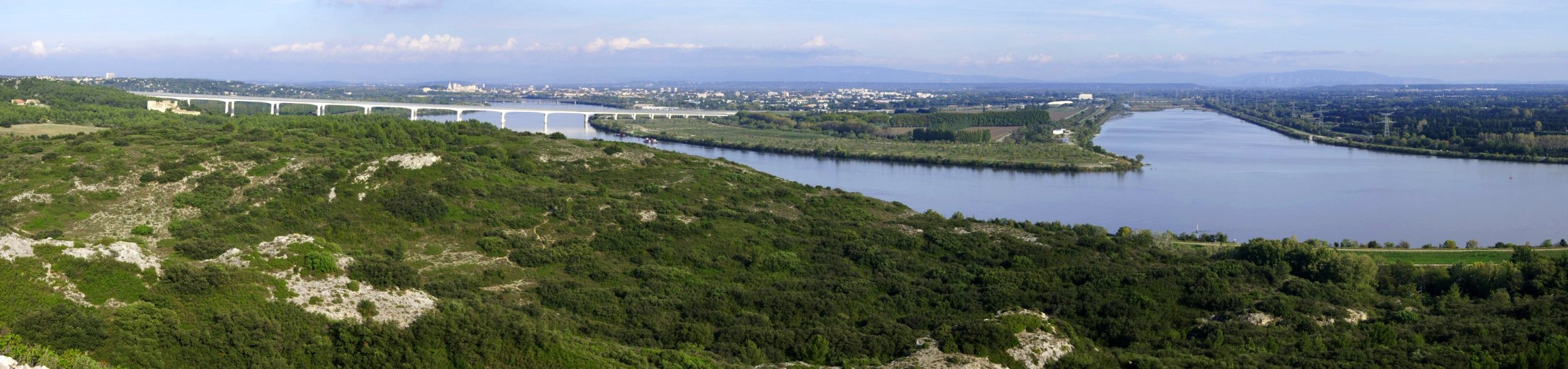
The confluence of the Durance and the Rhone

The north-western tip of the commune is the confluence of the Durance river, which forms the northern border of the commune, and the Rhône river, which forms the western border. The Canal des Alpines comes from the east and passes through the commune to continue south-west, parallel to the Rhône.

=== Geology ===
From a geological point of view there are two components of the commune's surface area:

- to the north and east, facing the present town, is a large plain which dates from the recent Quaternary period. It consists of modern alluvium from the Rhône and the Durance. The water table is located at one metre deep under very rich and intensely cultivated land which has neither pebbles nor gravel;
- to the west and south the Montagnette massif was formed by two uprisings. The first dates from the Neocomian period (70 million years ago) and the other is Miocene (10 million years ago).

This Montagnette hilly area has an area of about 6000 hectares, of which 2/3 are covered with Aleppo pines. About a quarter of the area is in the commune of Barbentane but the highest point, at 167m, is in the commune of Boulbon at Mount Raous, about 800m west of Frigolet Abbey.

== Toponymy ==
The first written evidence of Barbentane dates from the 9th century. Despite its late appearance this ancient name probably indicates a water source at the foot of a rocky rise: in Ligurian the syllable ar refers to water and tan to a cliff; and the prefixes barva or borvo are widespread throughout Europe. The etymology of Barbentane would be closer to spa towns such as La Bourboule, Barbotan-les-Thermes, etc.

Until the end of the 19th century the spelling was Barbantane with an "a" but the name is now consistently always spelled with an e instead, as Barbentane.

Barbentane is called Barbentana according to the classical norm of Occitan and Barbentano according to the Mistralian norm.

== History ==
=== Prehistory and Antiquity ===
Originally there were three separate occupied sites on the territory. The oldest is Fretta which disappeared in the 6th century but whose name has survived in the form of Frigolet. The other two sites of Bellinto and Barbentane are much better-known.

In 1957 excavations near the site of Fretta, a Chasséen human bone was discovered in a burial pit (right parietal bone from the 5th millennium BC) amongst various flints and animal bones (near Carrière district).

The Ligurians were the oldest people in the area who retained their name. Over time they associated with the Celts which resulted in the Celto-Ligurians. The name Bellinto came from these Celto-Ligurians (Bel meaning "ferry" and linto meaning "flat-bottomed boat") for the place where a ferry was permitted to cross the Durance.

The name Bellinto was written for the first time in 333 on the road from Bordeaux to Jerusalem. Well before that date, however, Bellinto already existed and it is likely that the most illustrious of its occupants during this period was Gaius Marius. This Roman general established his camp in the Montagnette before going to crush the Cimbri and the Teutons on the plain of Pourrières (near Aix-en-Provence) in 102 BC.

This came at the time of the Pax Romana which lasted for four centuries and of which many vestiges remain (sarcophagi and foundations in the upper village, etc.)

=== Middle Ages ===
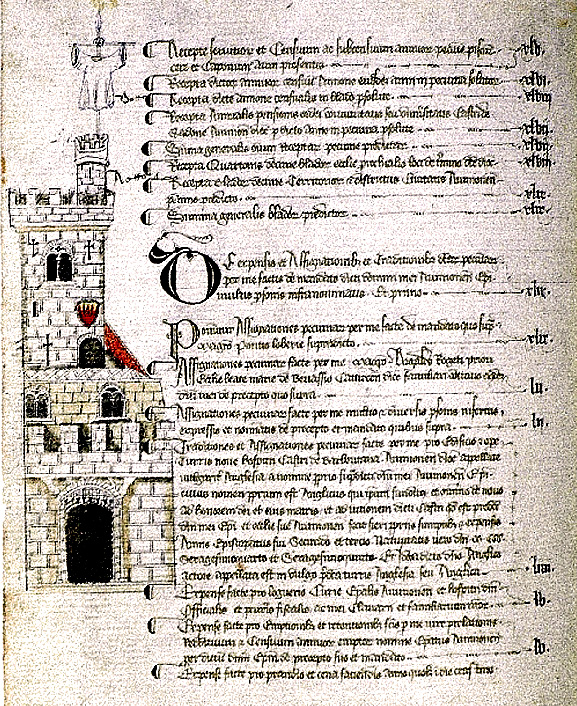
Drawing and description of the Tour Angelica (Anglica Tower), built in the 14th century at Barbentane by order of Cardinal Angel de Grimoard brother of Urban V in the Departmental Archives of Vaucluse

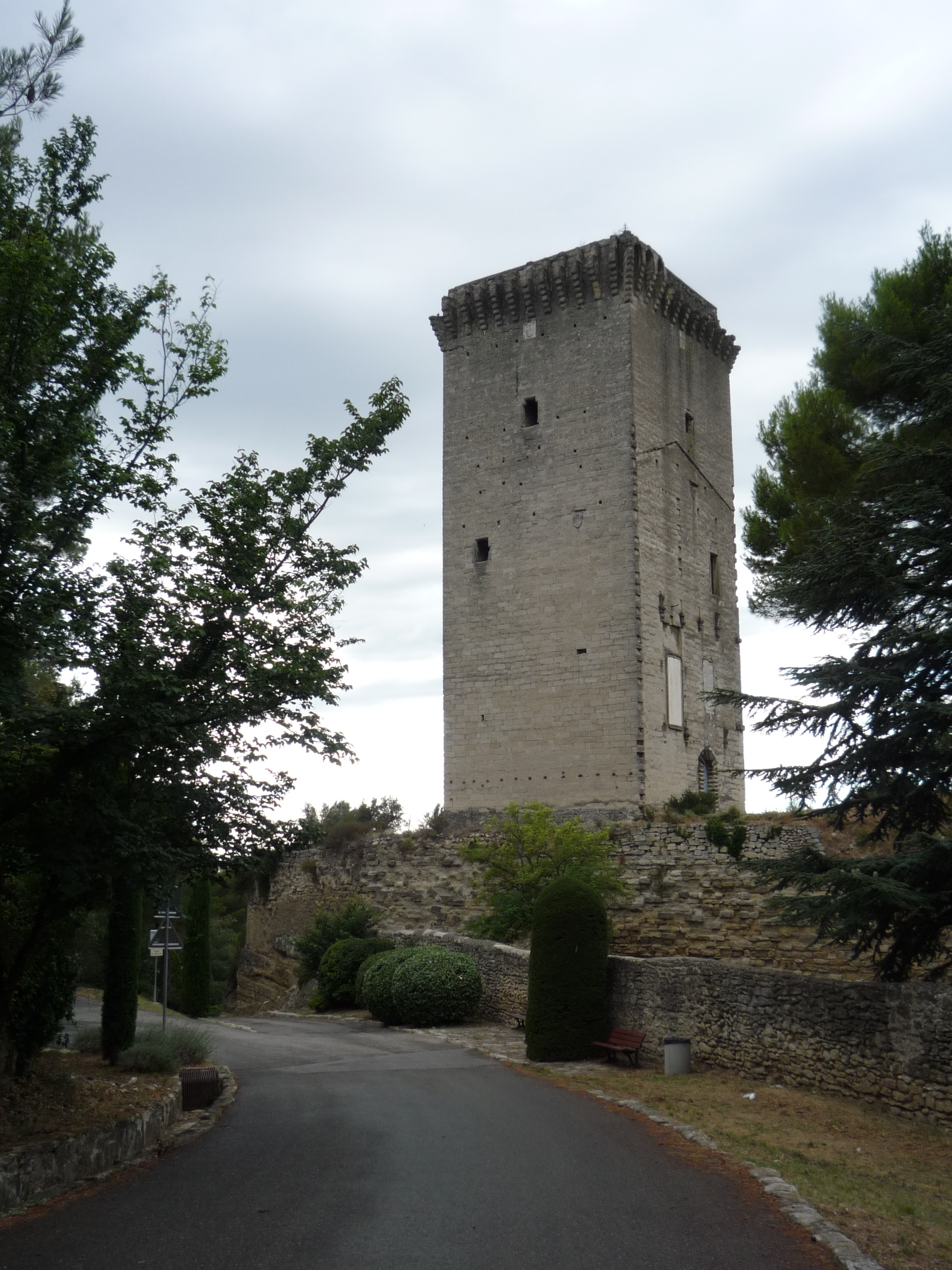
The Tour Barbentane

A time of peace was followed the successive invasions of the Alemanni, the Vandals, the Visigoths, the Burgundians, the Ostrogoths, the Franks, the Lombards, the Normans, and the Saracens.

The first known mention of a lord, in 1133, concerned Guillaume de Barbentane whose direct descendants until Marquis Henry de Puget de Cabassole du Réal de Barbentane were always from Barbentane. Guillaume lived in the Maison des Chevaliers (Knight's House), completed in 1178. As a borderland, Barbentane was alternately a fief of the Kingdom of France and of the Holy Roman Empire. It also benefited as a place of passage: a ferry crossing of the Durance is attested in 1178. The ferry merged with that of Rognonas around 1450.

The Papacy settled in Avignon in the 14th century and helped to clarify the situation. As well as all the benefits gained from the situation, including relief from or outright exemption from charges and taxes, the commune benefited from architectural attention and embellishments to the village. Enhanced fortifications and expansion of the church date from the same era as the Maison des Chevaliers and the construction of the Tour Anglica (Angelica Tower) in 1364-1365. This tower was named after Bishop Anglic de Grimoard, the brother of Pope Urban V and built for the modest sum of 4,000 florins.

=== French Revolution ===
During the French Revolution the priest of Barbentane, who was a Juror, was thrown bound and gagged into the Durance during the First White Terror of 1795.

Strong republican or monarchist/conservative family political traditions date from the Revolution. It is only since the end of the colonial wars that the people of Barbentane could express themselves politically as individuals without being banned from their families.

=== Heraldry ===
Old Arms of Barbentane	Old Arms of Barbentane Blazon: Gules, a tower Argent masoned in Sable.

Arms of Barbentane	Arms of Barbentane today. These arms date back to the first half of the 16th century. The F is the initial of King François I and the salamander was his personal emblem. Blazon: Parti per pale, first Gules, a tower Argent masoned in Sable; second Azure a salamander crowned enflamed of Or in pale grimpant a letter F turned to dexter.

== Administration ==
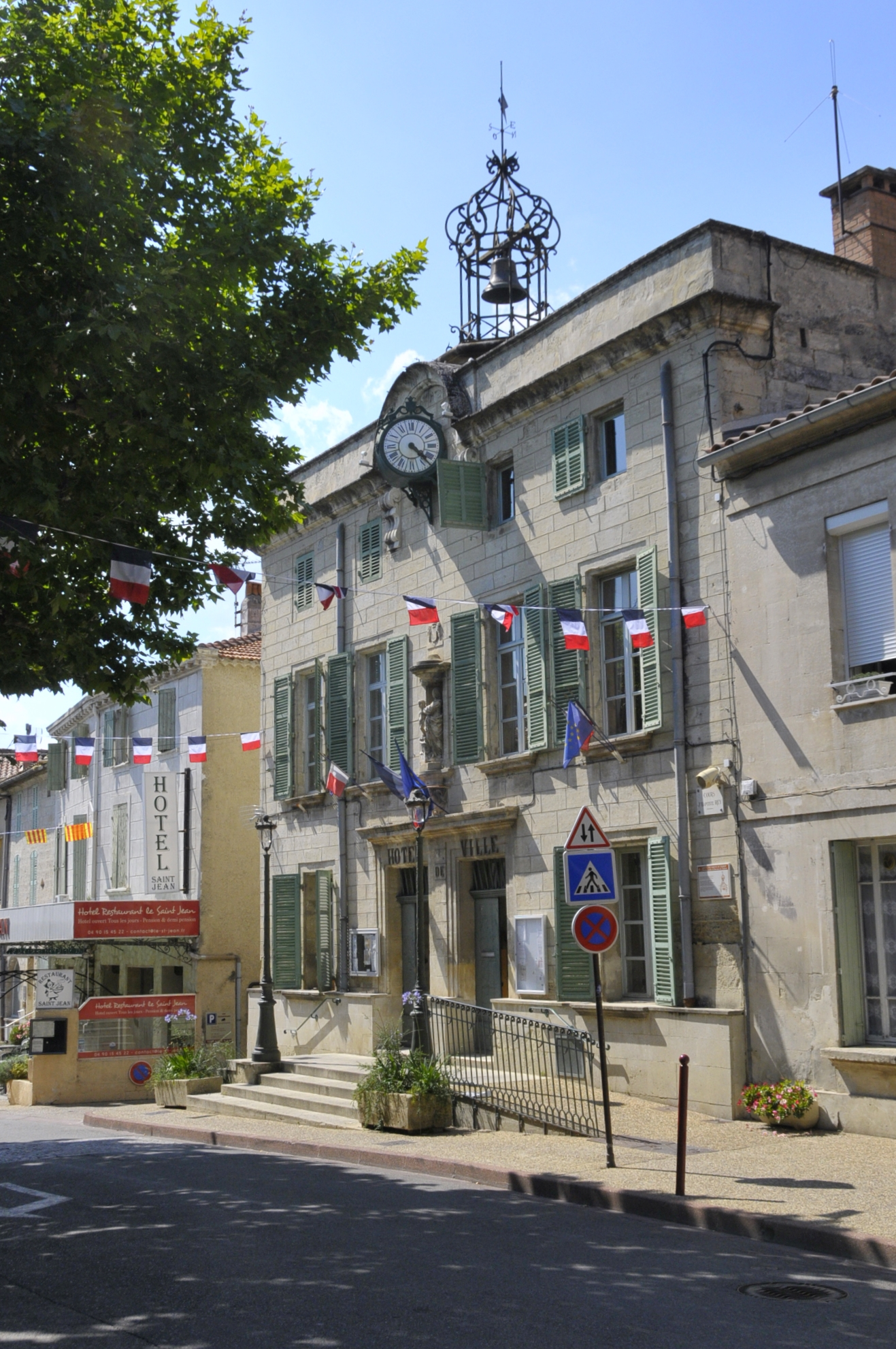
The Town Hall

List of Successive Mayors

From	To	Name
2001	March 2018	Jean-Louis Ichartel
March 2018	2026	Jean-Christophe Daudet
2026	incumbent	Michel Blanc

=== Twinning ===
Barbentane has twinning associations with Saillon (Switzerland) since 1994.

== Population ==
The inhabitants of the commune are known as Barbentanais or Barbentanaises in French.

Historical population
Year	Pop.	±% p.a.
1968	2,795	—
1975	2,864	+0.35%
1982	3,201	+1.60%
1990	3,273	+0.28%
1999	3,645	+1.20%
2007	3,757	+0.38%
2012	3,877	+0.63%
2017	4,143	+1.34%
2023	4,266	+0.49%
Source: INSEE

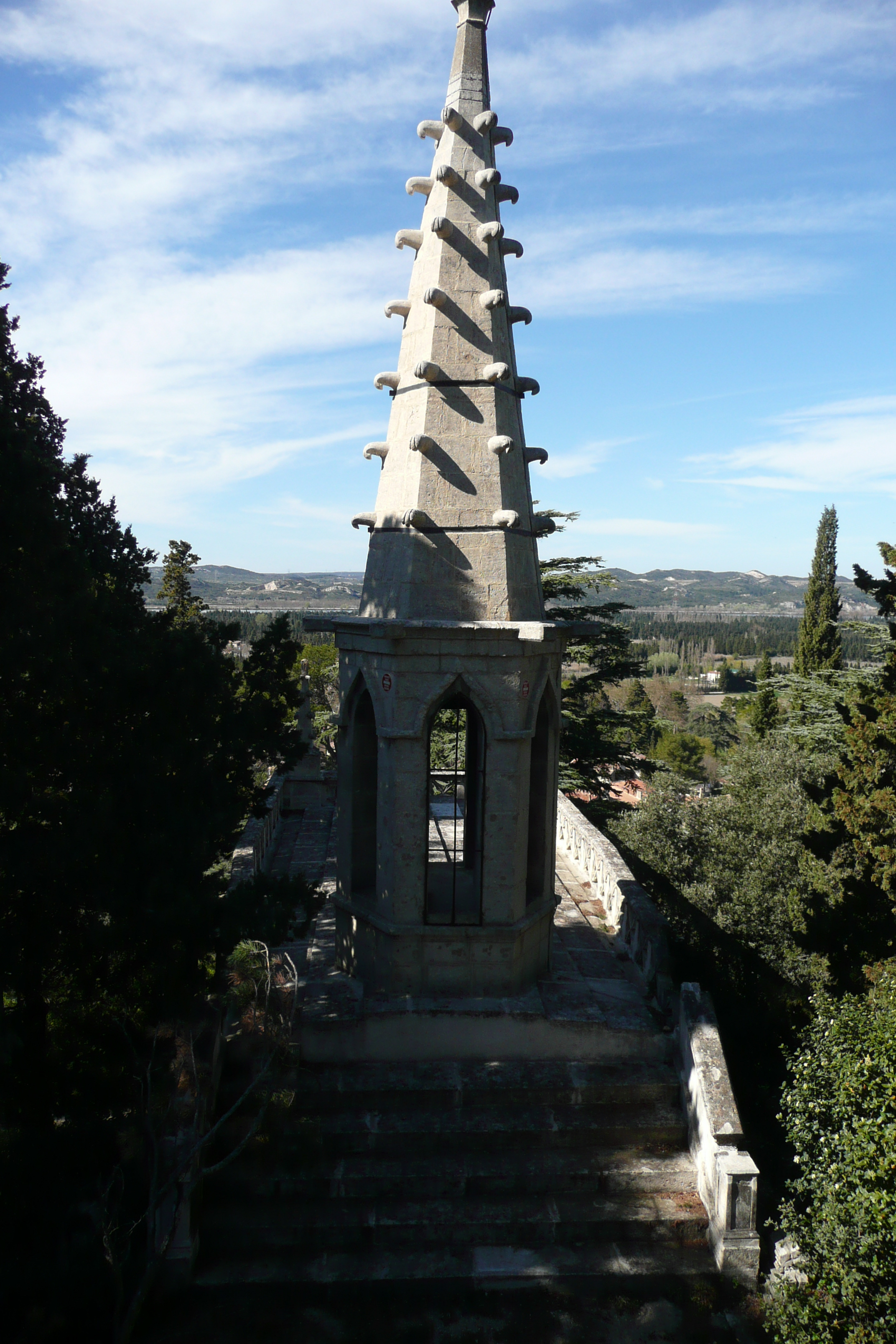
Oratory in Barbentane

== Economy ==
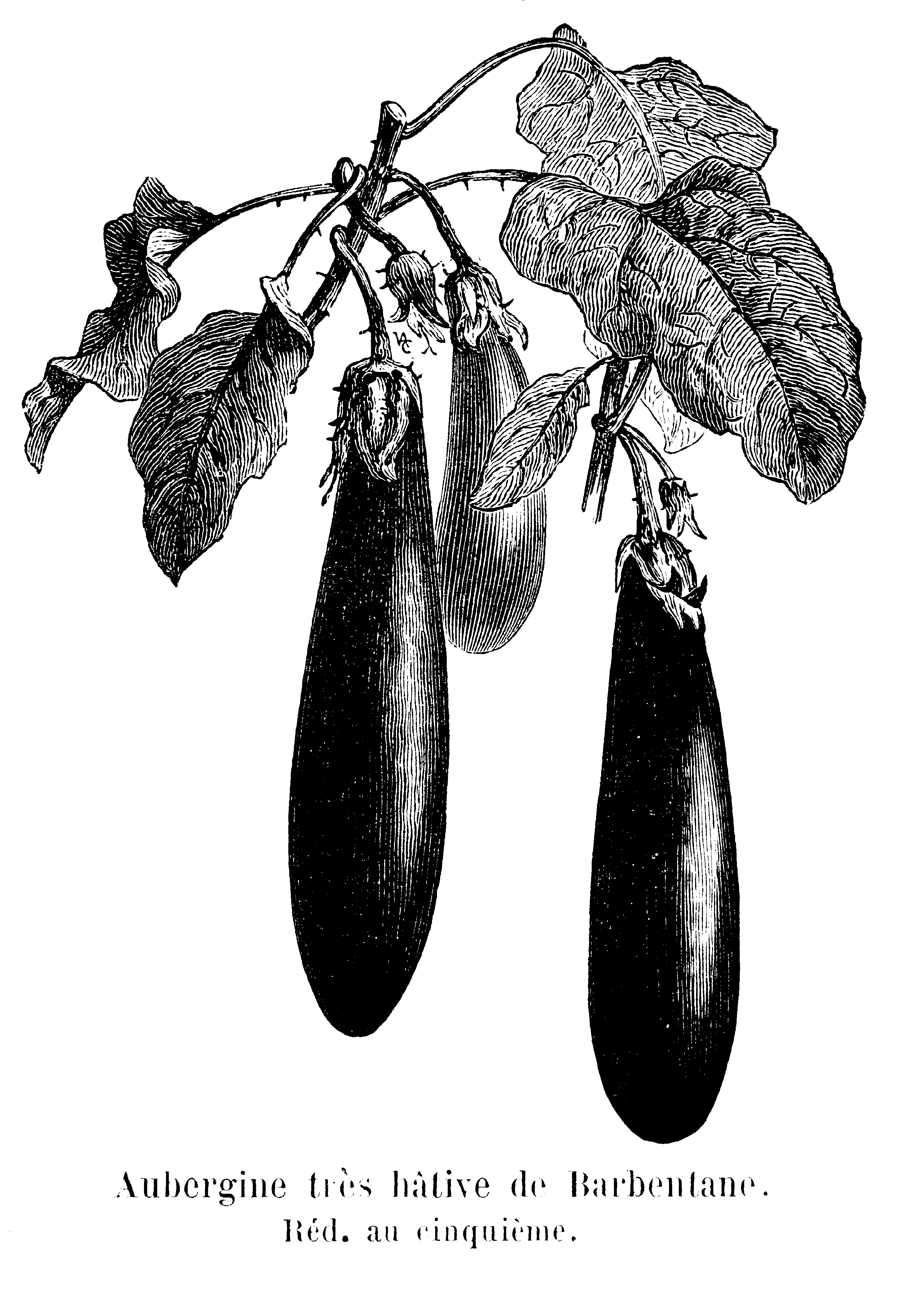
The native Aubergine (Eggplant)

The two major economic activities in Barbentane have always been from the beginning, agriculture and stone quarries.

Its large alluvial plain allows intensive, high quality agriculture, in historical times based mainly on autarkical crops—wheat, beans, etc. Then came a time when Dyer's Madder was cultivated - its first real industrial cultivation. Harvesting this plant required 1000 locals and 600 immigrant workers. This period of cultivation was short-lived—the market collapsed after a few years when chemical dyes appeared. However, the construction of the main Paris–Marseille railway via Lyon (the PLM) in the 1840s led to the replacement in local agricultures of madders by other fruit and vegetables. The land had already been leveled and irrigated; it remained only to plant cypress trees to protect the crops from the mistral to begin cultivation of these new crops. The Mediterranean sunshine combined with the presence of a very shallow and abundant water table and irrigation with water from the Canal des Alpines gave varied fruit (apples, pears, peaches, etc.) and vegetable (beans, eggplant, tomatoes, zucchini, etc.) crops. The Barbentane Railway Station was the junction with the railway line from Plan-d'Orgon (Bouches-du-Rhône) and for a long time was the largest railway station in France for fruit and vegetables. Farmers practiced a triennial crop rotation and continued their activities in winter with the harvest of olives and almonds in the Montagnette, and culture of salad plants (e.g. lettuce), cabbages, and spinach on the plain.

A variety of eggplant is called a "long purple eggplant of Barbentane". A variety of rustic and succulent figs is called "black of Barbentane". There is also a red cherry coloured rose which is named "Countess of Barbentane".

The rocky outcrop where the village is perched has been quarried for a long time. Barbentane stone was used in the construction of the village and the architectural elements of Avignon and surrounding villages.

The large void left by the quarrying within the village itself, were used by the inhabitants for Underground living and two districts remain fully inhabited today.

These two main economic activities are major users of manpower and this has led to strong immigration from Italy and Spain since ancient times and this lasted until the 1960s. Since then immigration has been mostly from the Maghreb.

Today the stone quarries have completely disappeared and agriculture has lost its primacy as the main activity of the village. Provençal culture remains very much alive.

As elsewhere it was common practice to give nicknames (place of residence, skill, notable actions, etc.) to differentiate between people who often had the same last name. The Barbentanais were nicknamed Li Broument, a Provençal word meaning "many" and used only in Barbentane.

Barbentane has its culinary specialty, "Les Tirettes" which are made from a special pâte and eaten at Sunday lunch and on holidays.

== Culture and heritage ==
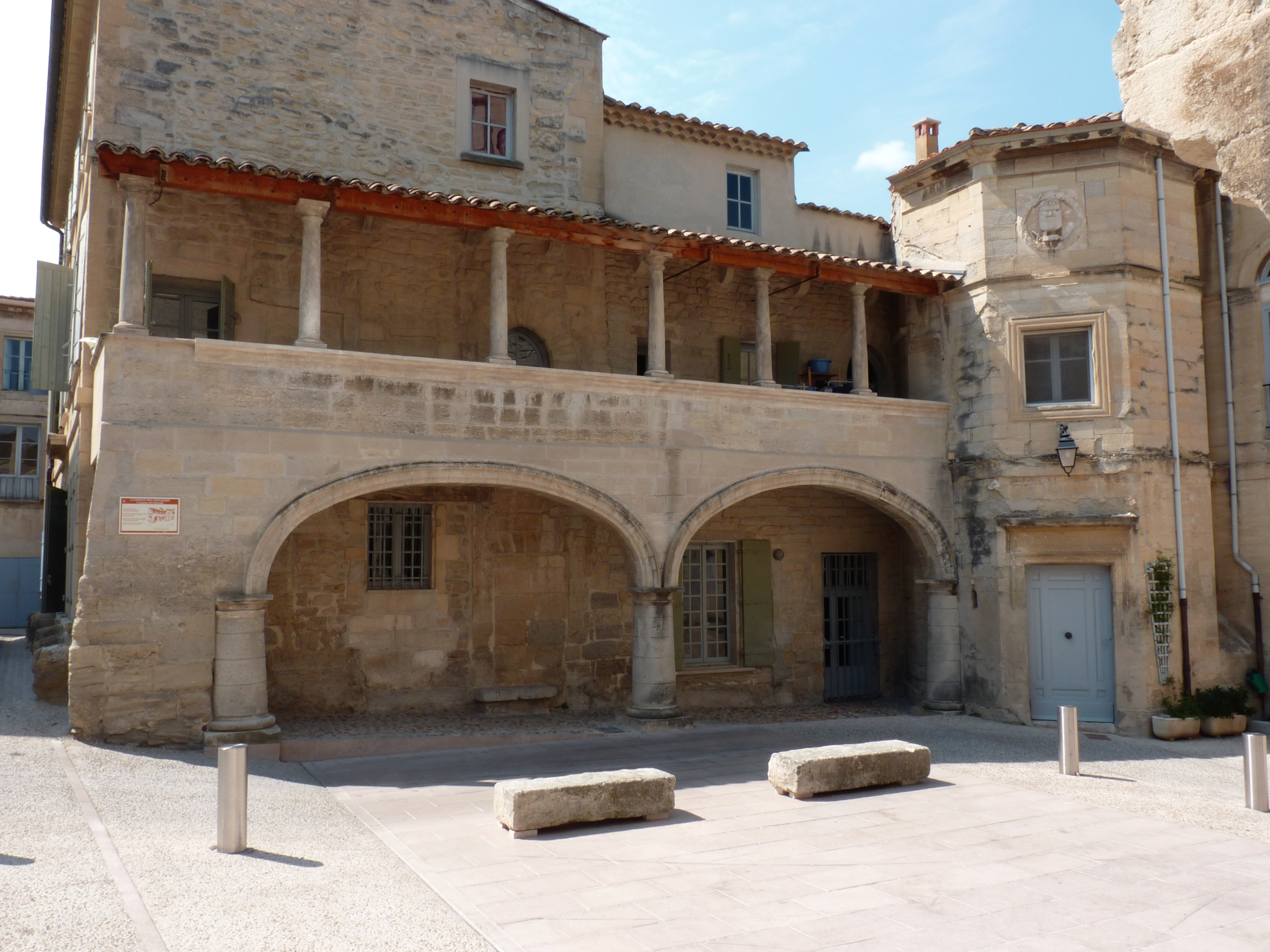
The Maison des Chevaliers

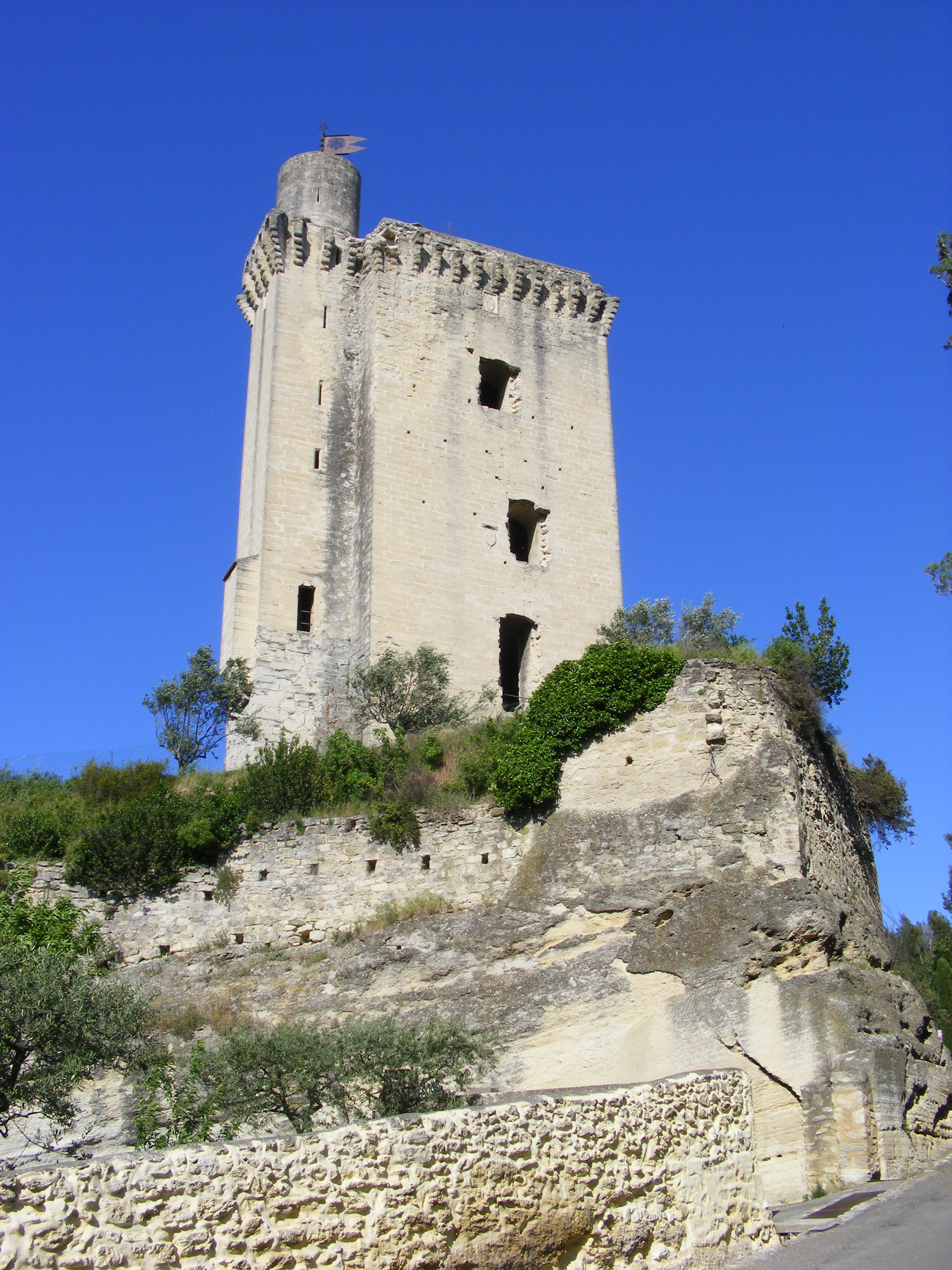
Cardinal Grimaldi Tower

=== Civil heritage ===
The commune has a number of buildings and structures that are registered as historical monuments:

- The Bullfight Arena on the D77B (1993)
- The Maison des Chevaliers (House of Knights) (13th century) has a Renaissance façade composed of a turret and two large arches topped by a columned gallery. The house was originally built in 1133 and belonged to the Marquis de Barbentane. The arches on the ground floor and the columns on the 1st floor date to the 16th century. The building was restored in 2000. The north wing served as town hall from 1670 to 1888.
- The Tour du Cardinal Grimaldi (Cardinal Grimaldi Tower) (14th century), also called the Tour Anglica (Tower Anglica), is the probable location of an oppidum. A castle was built there by the Bishop of Arles in 898. The tower itself was built in just two years (1364-1365) by Angel de Grimoard (brother of Pope Urban V) and it was the property of the fief of Barbentane. It served as a forward defence for the papal city of Avignon. The tower is 28 metres high and 10 metres wide. It is topped with a round turret, or trunnion, surmounted by a flag with the motto Più forte nell' aversità (Stronger in adversity) and the papal coat of arms (tiara plume, and keys). Frédéric Mistral wrote of it in his poem Lis Isclo d'Or in 1875 which earned him the Nobel Prize for Literature in 1904 (with José Echegaray, a Basque writer). It has served as an observatory for Cassini who was charged by King Louis XV to map France in the middle of the 18th century. Legend has it that there is a tunnel stretching from the tower to the Palace of the Popes. It could conceal some of the Vatican's treasures and the Germans began excavating to find it from 1943 to 1944. The tower is located in the private park of the Chateau of Andigné and remains a symbol of Barbentane. There was a well called "Puits du Seigneur" (The lord's Well) which supplied water to the Anglica Tower and was close to the side that supports the tower. Marius Girard, Félibrige of Saint-Rémy-de-Provence, wrote a poem Le Puits du Seigneur.

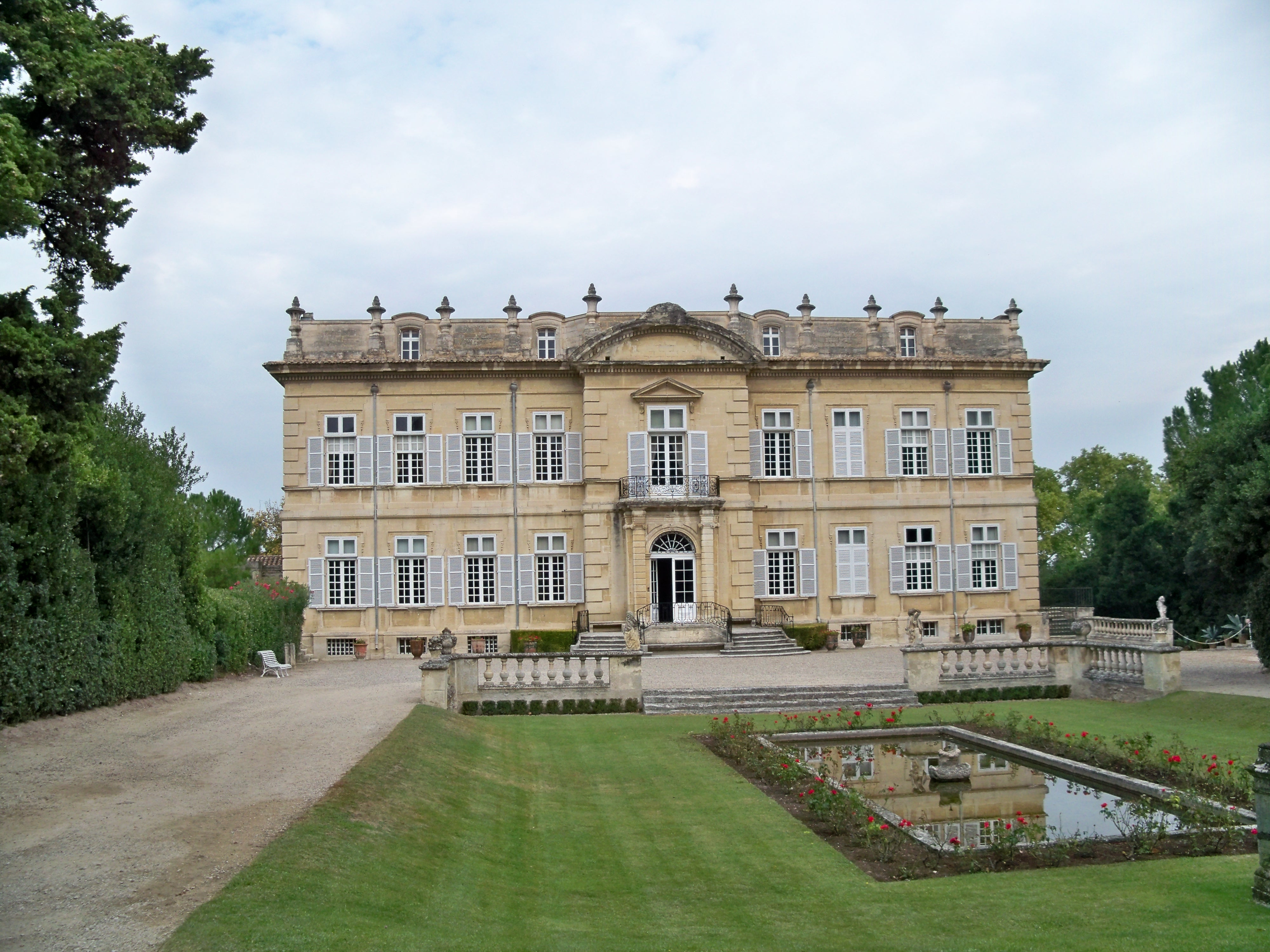
The Chteau of Barbentane

- The Chateau of Barbentane (1653) is called the Petit Trianon de la Provence (The little Trianon of Provence) and was built in 1674 by Paul-François I of Puget, co-lord of Barbentane. Pierre Mignard II was the architect. It was remodeled by Paul-François II, his son, in 1741 with flat arches and a low profile to illustrate his glory. The interior was decorated in the 18th century by Joseph Pierre Balthazar de Puget, co-lord of Barbentane, son of Paul-François II, ambassador of Louis XV in Tuscany, when he was 20 years old. The Chateau was saved during the French Revolution when Hilarion Paul François Bienvenu de Puget, co-lord of Barbentane and a former officer of the king, agreed to become General of the Republic. The Chateau was the origin of the first suburbs of the village. The porch of the southern façade has an excellent view of the Barbentane Tower, the village, and the Montagnette. The Chateau contains several items that are registered as historical objects:
  - 2 Louis XVI Wing Chairs (18th century)
  - 6 Louis XV Chairs (18th century)
  - 2 Louis XV Sofas (18th century)
  - A Louis XV Chest of Drawers (18th century)
  - A framed Painting: The Entombment (1541)
- The Chateau Park (18th century)
- An Agricultural Cooperative (1950)

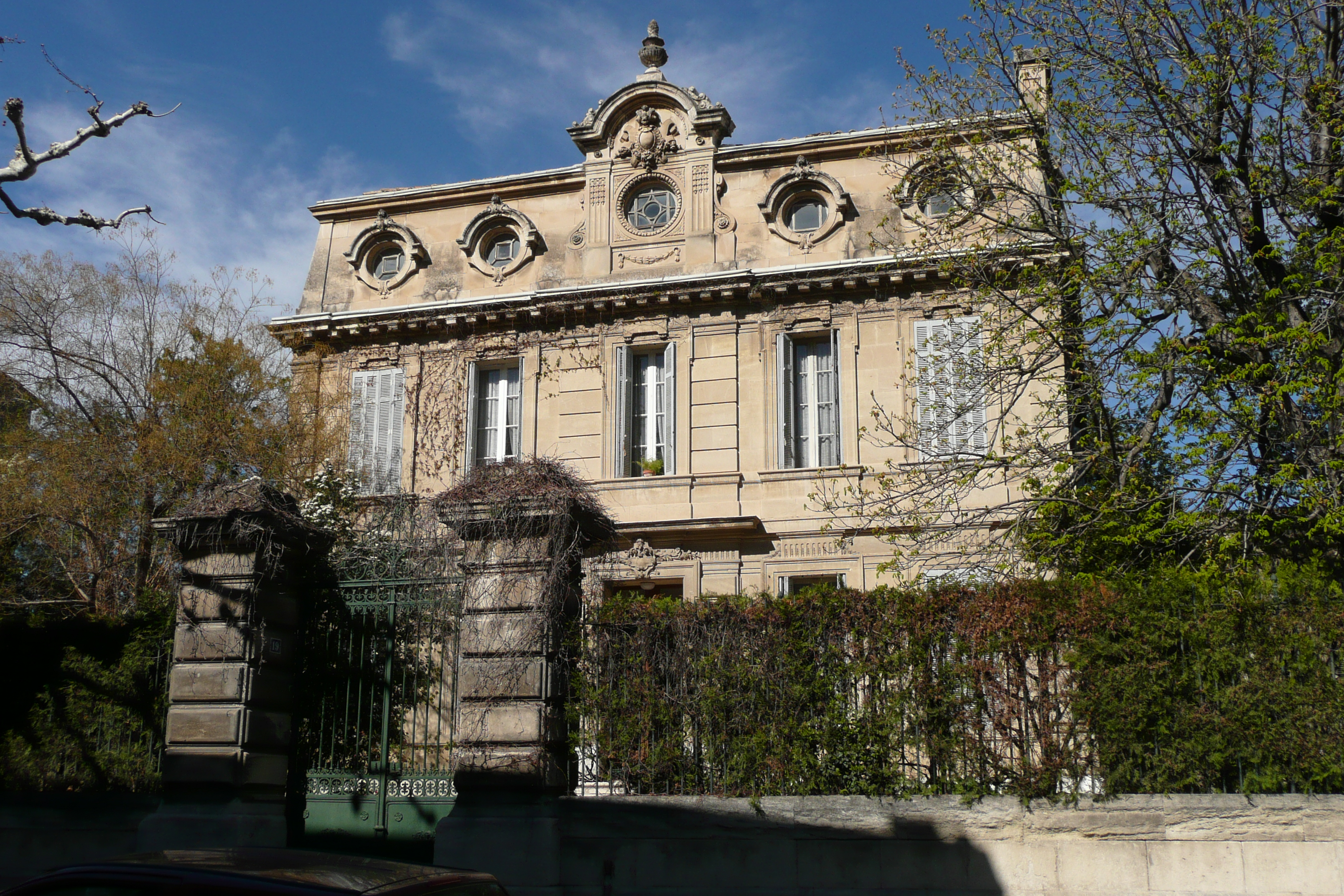
The Town Hall

- The Hotel of the Barons of Chabert is a house in Louis XIII style built in the early 17th century. This building has been the Town Hall since 1888. The interior can be visited during Heritage Days. Its wrought iron belfry supports the bell for the clock which weighs 250 kg. Louis XIV as a child stayed here overnight. It contains several items that are registered as historical objects:
  - 2 Paintings (19th century)
  - The Interior of the Mayor's Office (19th century)
  - A Statue: Virgin and child (18th century)

==== The old village ====
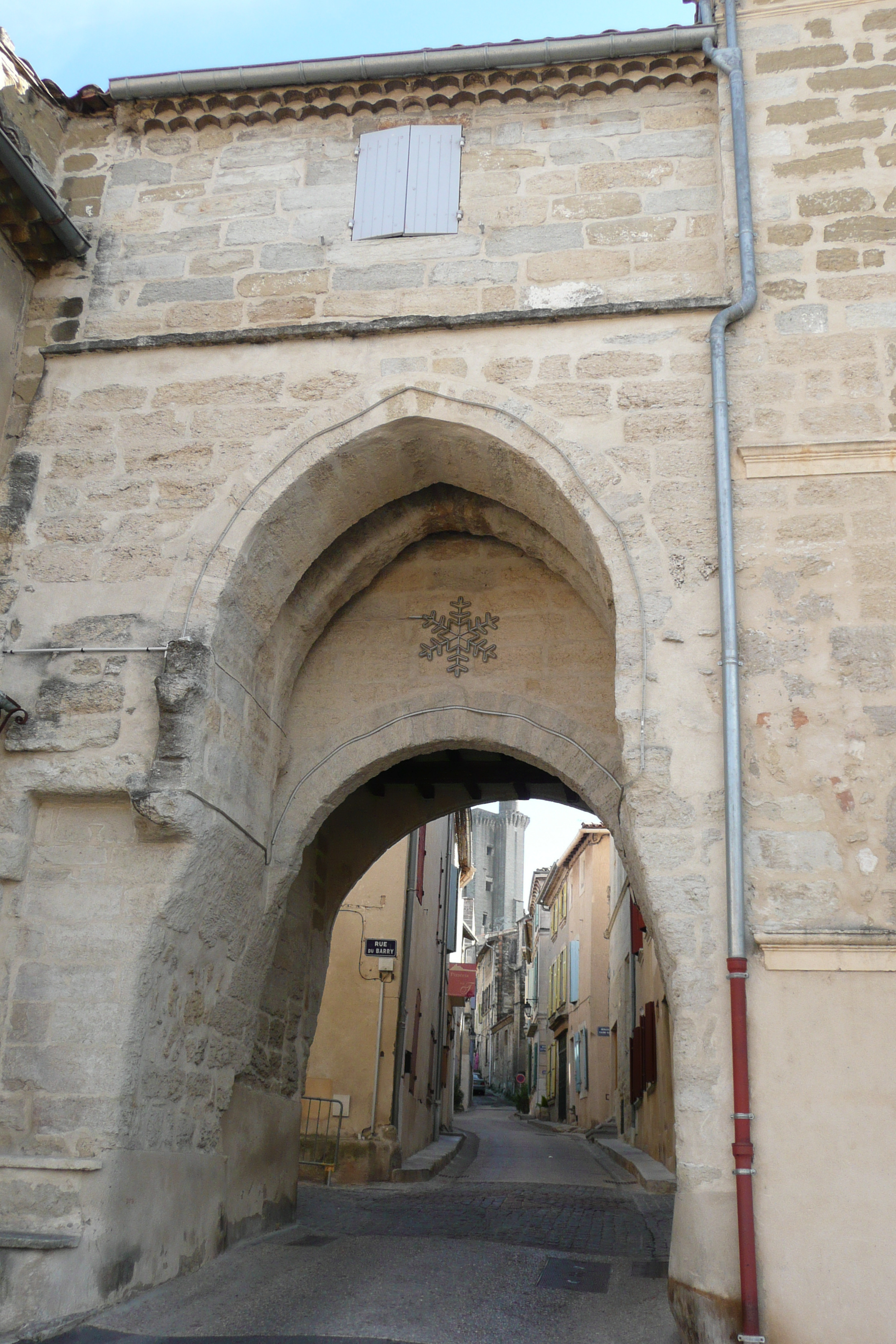
A Town Gate

- The old village has preserved the Calendale and Séquier entrances from the old fortifications.
- The Grand-Rue was the main street of the village in the 20th century. It included all types of commercial bakeries, butcher shops, shoe shops, bazaar, grocery store, etc. At 50 metres on the right is one of the finest and oldest houses in the village. Its four-sided roof is completed at each corner by a gargoyle of carved stone. It is topped with a solarium. Also on the right is the Impasse Matheron where there is one of many wells. It was 42 metres deep with a water depth of 12 metres. This street has views of the Anglica Tower.
- The Rue du Séquier is a street dating to the late Middle Ages. It has some frontages with mullioned windows. At the beginning of the street on the left there is a courtyard from an ancient tower.
- The Cours is the main square of the village. In the 18th century it was called Le jeu de balle (The ball game) and it owes its current etymology from the verb "to race" (running one behind the other). Shaded by plane trees there are the town hall, post office, and coffee shops, etc.
- The Rue du Four is where the old village oven has been since at least the 14th century (cited as 9 November 1318 in the Vatican archives). There has always been a bakery there.
- The Planet is a district that was owned by the Mondragon lineage. This family, inconvenienced by detours made to deliver feed to their stables, drilled a new entrance in the ramparts: the "new entrance".
- The Rue de la Croix-Rouge whose name came from an ancient brotherhood. At the beginning of this street there are many houses with closed courtyards and very aesthetic porches that are more like farmhouses than town houses. They were owned by the Mondragons who preferred to have their farmhouses in the village safe from flooding on the plain.
- The Rue Porte-Neuve is a 19th-century middle-class district with typical stylish facades.
- The Rue du Paty is an old street which allowed exit from the village on its western side towards the Montagnette (grazing place or Pàti). The gap in the road at the Guyot bridge was not filled until the middle of the 19th century. Before then it was necessary to leave the village by the Chemin de Canade and pass level with the communal entry of the Chateau of Barbentane.
- The passages under Andigné Park. Andigné Park was developed around 1850 but, as it covered two streets, a compromise was reached by the building of two underpasses. The first, of very modest dimensions, was almost entirely excavated in the rock leading to the west. The second north/south oriented is more important. It is called La Pousterle and served as a shelter for the poor in the early 20th century.

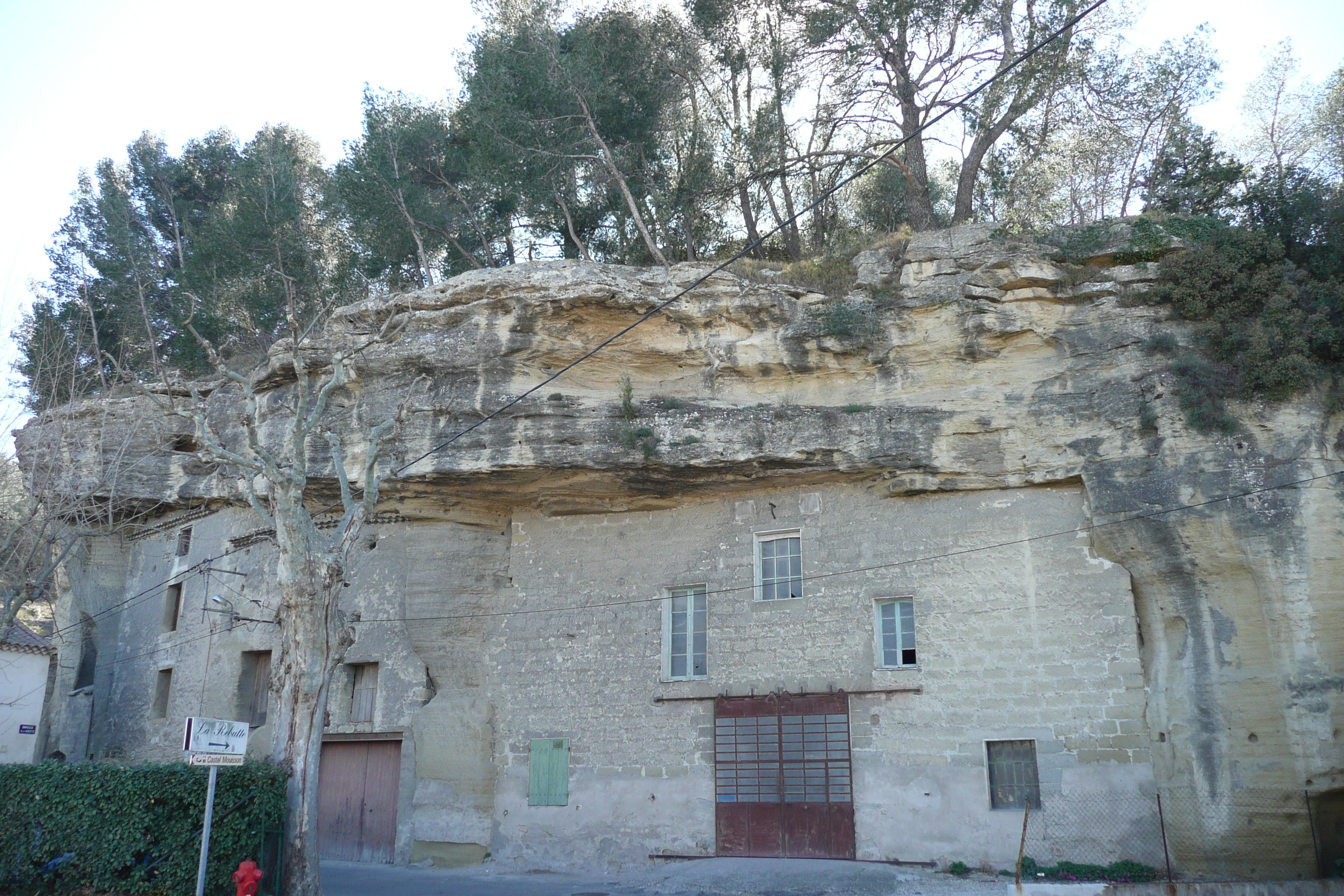
A Cave Dwelling

- The Place de Séquier has a cave house above the village. This area dates from the early Middle Ages and was used as a first habitation for immigrants who came to settle in the village from the middle of the 19th century. In fact from very ancient times immigrant workers came here temporarily to help in the harvest. Subsequently, since the construction of the railway line they came in waves and settled more or less permanently in the village. The harvest of madder used more than 1,000 men from the village and 600 immigrants for a period. When madder cultivation disappeared, the harvest of fruit and vegetables replaced it was as work for these men and women. The area had particularly immigrants of Italian origin.
- The Rue de la Clastre. This alley could be used only by donkeys. Near its north end the arms of the city of Barbentane are still visible on a facade in right hand. Originally these arms had only one round tower that can still be seen at the corner of the house of the Consuls on the church square. In February 1516 François I, returning to Marignan, made a stop in Manosque where the people charged the Honnorade (or Peronne) of Voland to present the keys to the city to him. As the king was too interested in the young lady, the nickname "modest Manosque" was coined. One or two days later the same François I, who was celebrating carnival in Avignon, "spent an excellent night in Barbentane..." and as a result donated his emblem, the salamander, to the city. The Barbentanais hastened to match it with the tower and surmounted the whole with the royal crown (today a mural crown). The Maison des Chevaliers gave its name to the Rue de la Clastre (Clastrum meaning "closed courtyard").
- The Rue Pujade is an old name which comes from the Latin meaning "give punishment" as the inhabitants went to fetch water from the water source in the district called La Fontaine along this steep street through a postern which pierced the walls.

==== The Fortifications ====
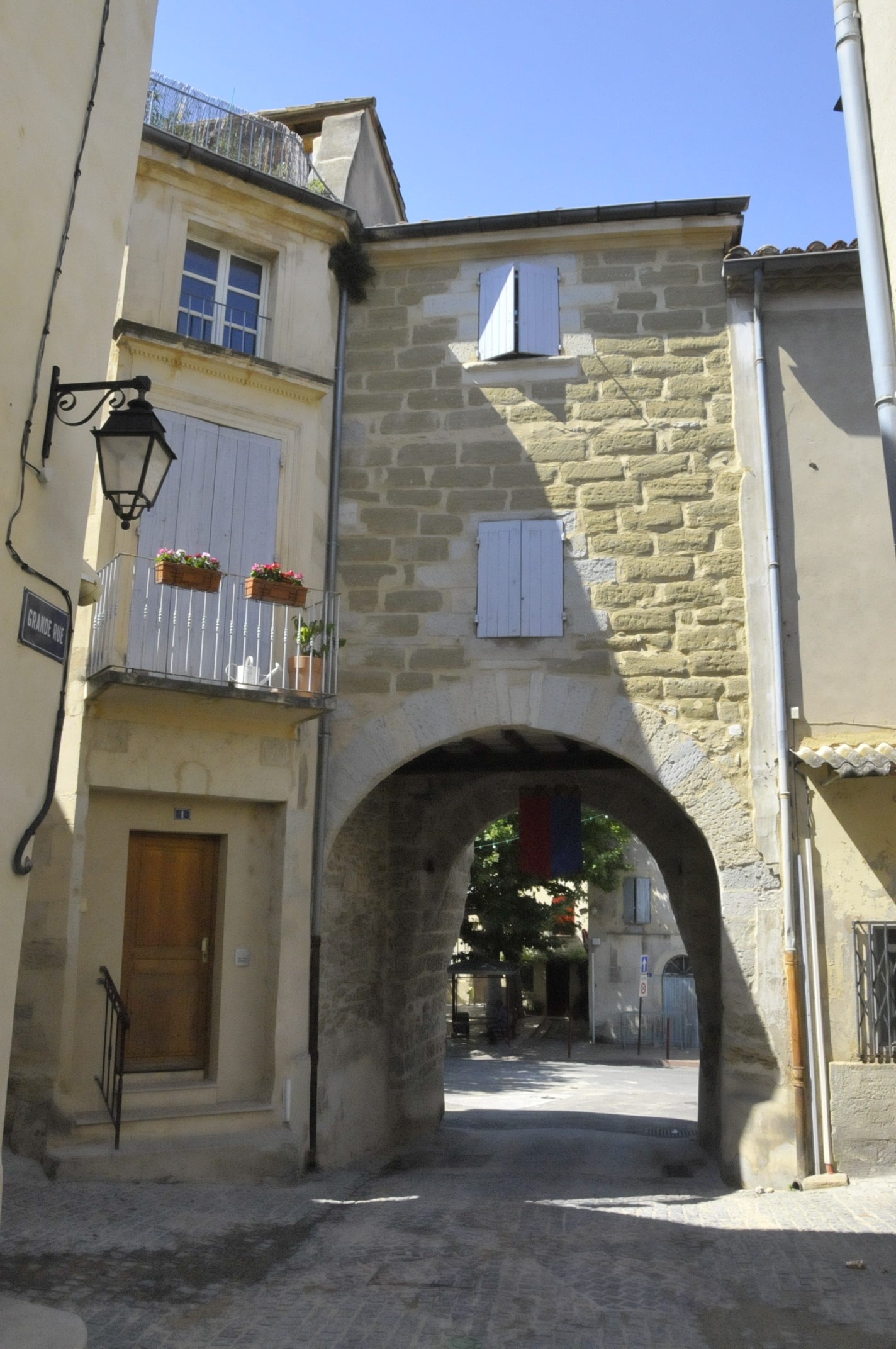
The Calendrale Gate

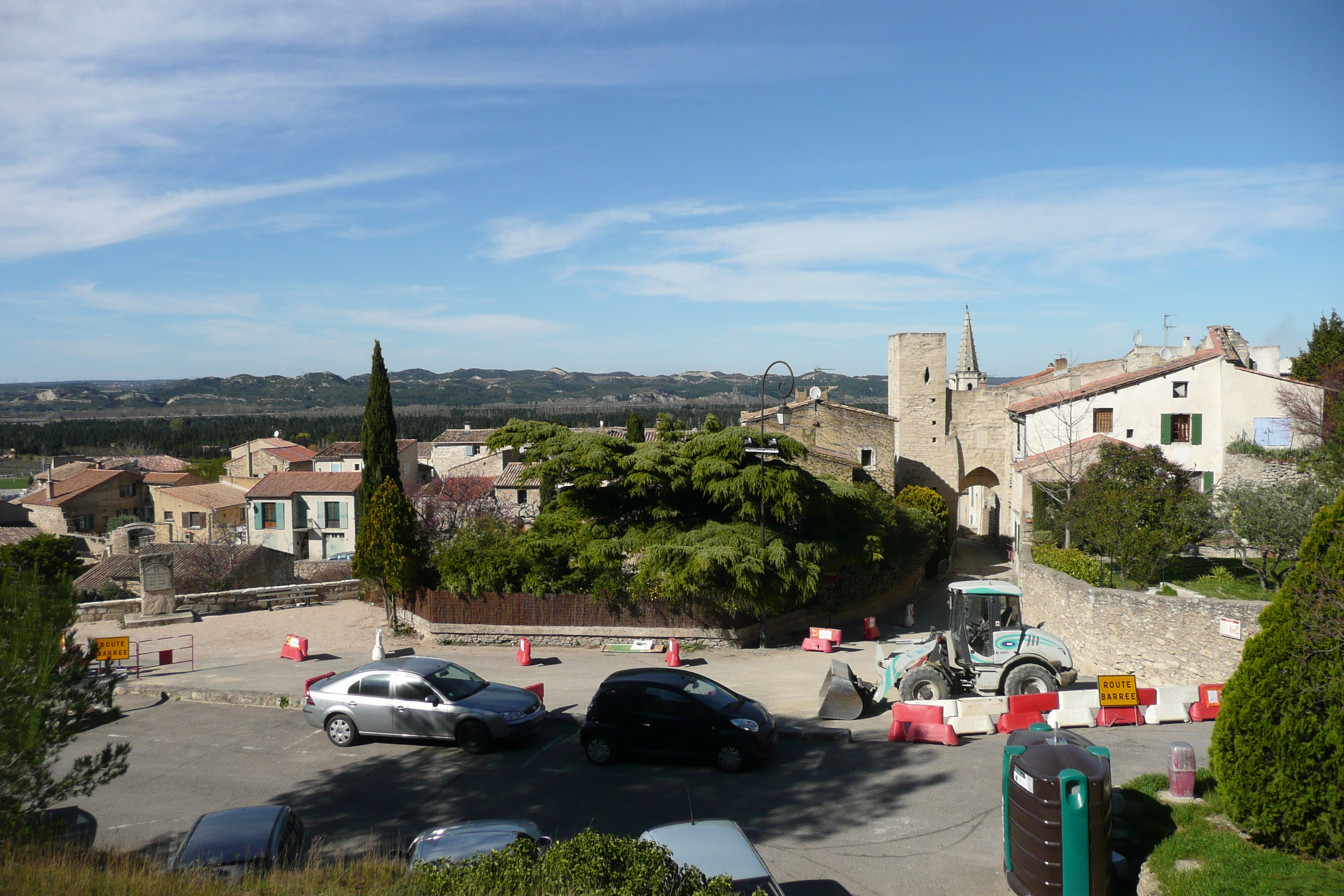
The Séquier Gate

- The ramparts, or Bàrri were built in the 9th century. Historically they were pierced by two gates: to the north Calendrale or Saracen gate and to the south the Séquier gate. There were also two water gates: to the west the Pujade postern and to the east the Pousterle postern. The ramparts were embellished and enhanced in the 14th century together with the construction of the Anglica Tower. Their peculiarities of "hollow walls" meant that once they had ceased military use, they were immediately converted into houses. They are still very visible today.
- The Calendale Gate or Saracen Gate was built in the 9th century at the same time as the first ramparts. It was rebuilt and enhanced in the 14th century. In 1660 there was an attempt on a commune house which failed but resulted in the destruction of the upper tower. Its portcullis, in Saracen style, was closed by the captain of the city in times of danger and so was given its other name of "Saracen Gate". The portcullis was sold in the early 18th century to a blacksmith from Tarascon and was almost completely destroyed at that time.
- The Séquier Gate also dates to the 9th century. It was the south gate of the old city walls and it had the Barbentane crest which was damaged during the Revolution. It was restored recently. Originally it was in this area that different fruit and vegetables were dried before storing, hence its name.
- The Caradone Tower, to the west and above the Hospice, is still visible in the western part of the village. It has excellent views of the stages of construction of the ramparts, with a small building as the first stage followed by an expansion dating from the 14th century. A third stage in red brick was added by an amateur astronomer.

==== Other sites of interest ====
- The Chateau of Andigné was recently built in 1850. It has two square towers overlooking a courtyard. Originally, it was the home of the Marquis de Robin de Barbentane. Its history is little known and it is likely that its foundations are very old. The top of a Roman sarcophagus (2nd or 3rd century), found during the construction of the PLM railway line around 1840 is incorporated in the facade. This early Christian carving represents the banquet of immortality or the taurobole (sacrifice of the bull). There is a park shaded by age old cedars and filled with all species from a Mediterranean forest rises to a chapel from the 19th century. It contains a crypt for the Andigné family tomb for the descendants of Marquis Robin de Barbentane.
- The Maison des Consuls (House of Consuls) is north of the church square. (see the book by Denis Martin, Communal Chronicle of Barbentane in the 17th century from 1690 to 1790 (in French)).
- The Hôtel Dieu was probably built in the 14th century. In 1407 it was called the "Hospital of the Poor in Christ of Barbentane". It was enlarged in the 16th century and was then called Hôtel Dieu under the invocation of the Archangel Raphael. It has a chapel which was built in 1732. Transformed recently to a municipal retirement home La Raphaële, it is still active.
- The prison was built in the thickness of the ancient ramparts and has been restored recently. It's a simple room carved into the rock.

=== Religious heritage ===
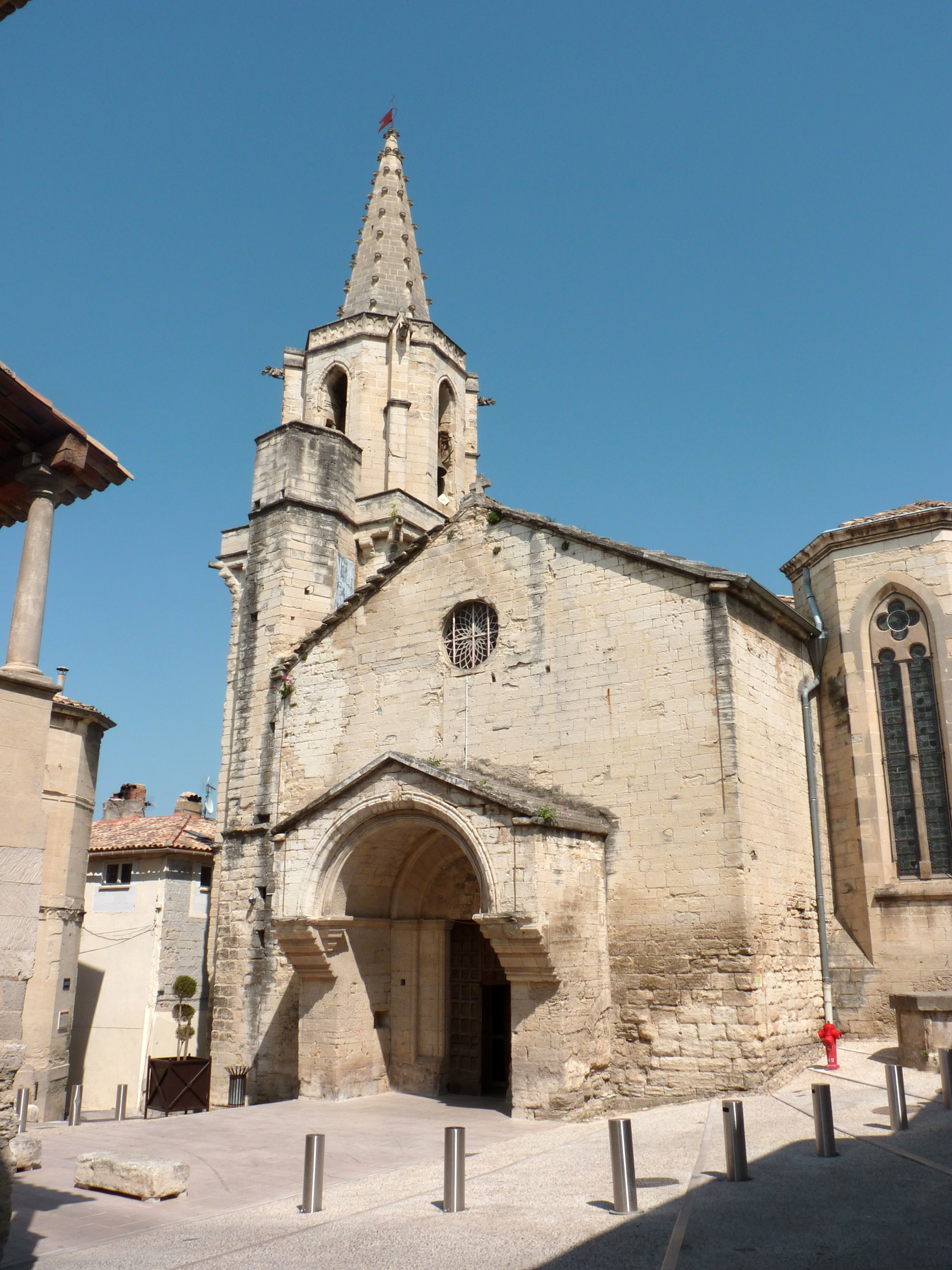
The Church of Notre-Dame-des-Grâces

The Church of Notre-Dame-des-Grâces is registered as an historical monument. The Church and bell tower are probably located on the site of an older building (possibly a Roman temple or chapel). The church was originally a semi-circular Romanesque church from the 12th century under the first two spans. It was extended the first time by Cardinal Grimoard, brother of Pope Urban V, in the 14th century by the addition of two Gothic bays and an apse in 1324. Several chapels have been added to it:

- The Chapel of Sainte-Croix (15th century);
- The Chapel of Neuve (16th century);
- The Chapel of Mondragon (17th century);
- The Chapel du Midi (1867) in neo-Gothic style by architect Caramagnole from Marseille. The porch dates to the 15th century.

The bell tower was erected over the Chapel of Sainte-Croix between 1486 and 1492. It is 21 metres high and was topped by a spire of 7 metres which was destroyed by cannonballs during the French Revolution in 1794. All the bells except one were shipped to Marseille to "make weapons against the enemies of the nation". The spire was rebuilt in 1983.

The Church contains many items that are registered as historical objects:

- A Cross: Christ on the Cross (17th century)
- A Statue: Saint Mark (18th century)
- A Statue: Saint John the Baptist (18th century)
- The Choir enclosure: Communion grill (1828)
- A Statue: Saint Roch (18th century)
- A Painting: Institution of the Rosary
- A Painting: Saints Catherine and Roch (18th century)
- A Painting: The Holy Family (17th century)

=== Films in Barbentane ===
The village has appeared in several scenes in the film by Les Charlots called Stadium Nuts released in 1972.

=== Cultural distinctions ===
Barbentane is one of the communes to receive the Esperanto Green Star, an award given to mayors of communes who identify the speakers of the constructed language Esperanto.

== See also ==
- Communes of the Bouches-du-Rhône department
