= Saillon =

- Municipality
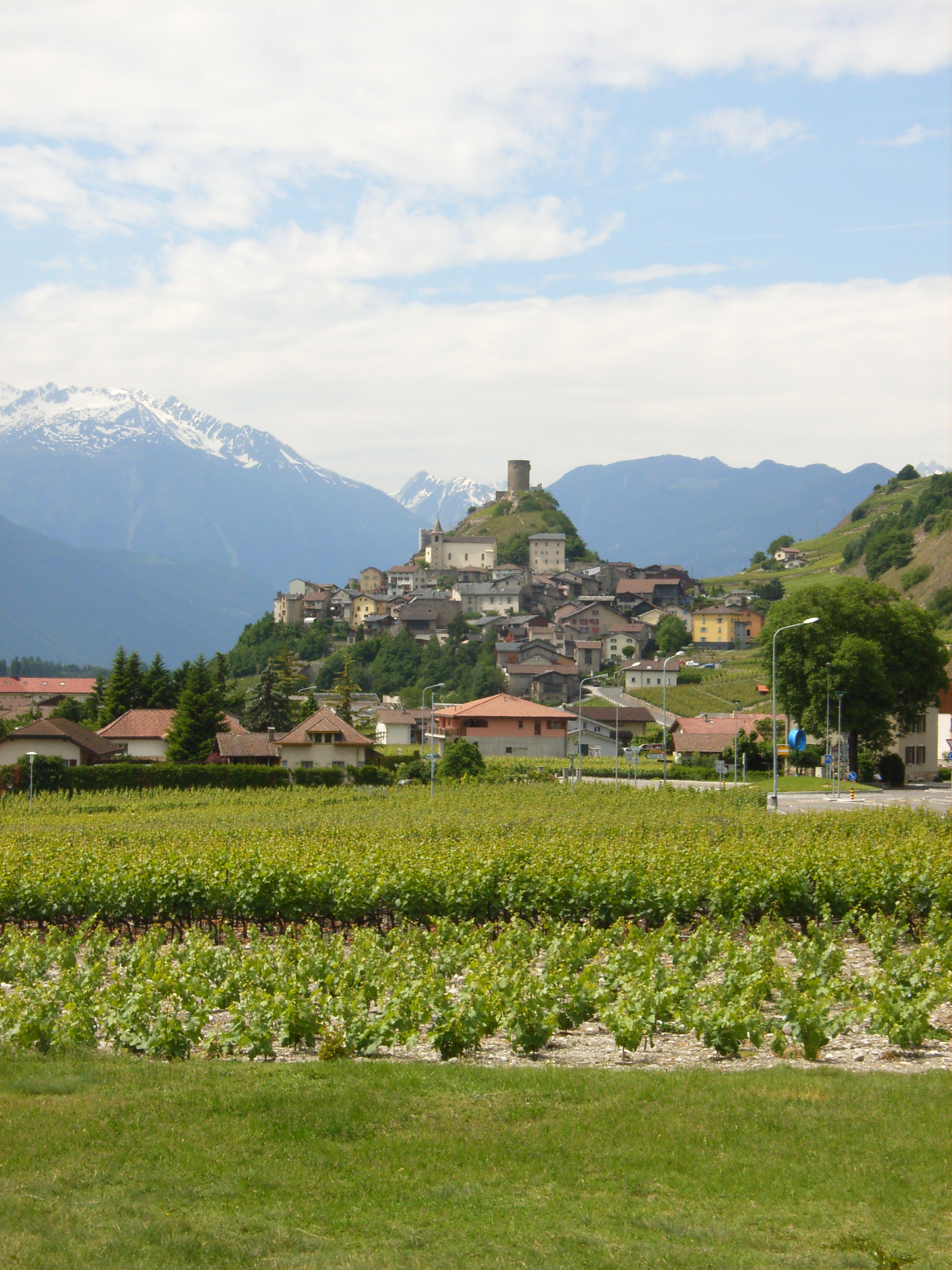

- Flag Coat of arms
- Location of Saillon
- Location within Switzerland Location within Canton of Valais
- Coordinates: 46°10′N 7°11′E
- Country: Switzerland
- Canton: Valais
- District: Martigny

Government
  - Mayor: Alba Mesot-Buchard

Area
  - Total: 13.7 km^{2} (5.3 sq mi)
- Elevation: 510 m (1,670 ft)

Population (December 2002)
  - Total: 1,584
  - Density: 116/km^{2} (299/sq mi)
- Time zone: UTC+01:00 (CET)
  - Summer (DST): UTC+02:00 (CEST)
- Postal code: 1913
- SFOS number: 6140
- ISO 3166 code: CH-VS
- Surrounded by: Fully, Leytron, Riddes, Saxon
- Twin towns: Barbentane (France)
- Website: www.saillon.ch

Saillon (French pronunciation: [sajɔ̃]; Arpitan: Salyon) is a municipality in the district of Martigny in the canton of Valais in Switzerland.

== History ==
Saillon is first mentioned in 1052 as castellum Psallionis. The municipality was formerly known by its German name Schellon, however, that name is no longer used.

== Geography ==
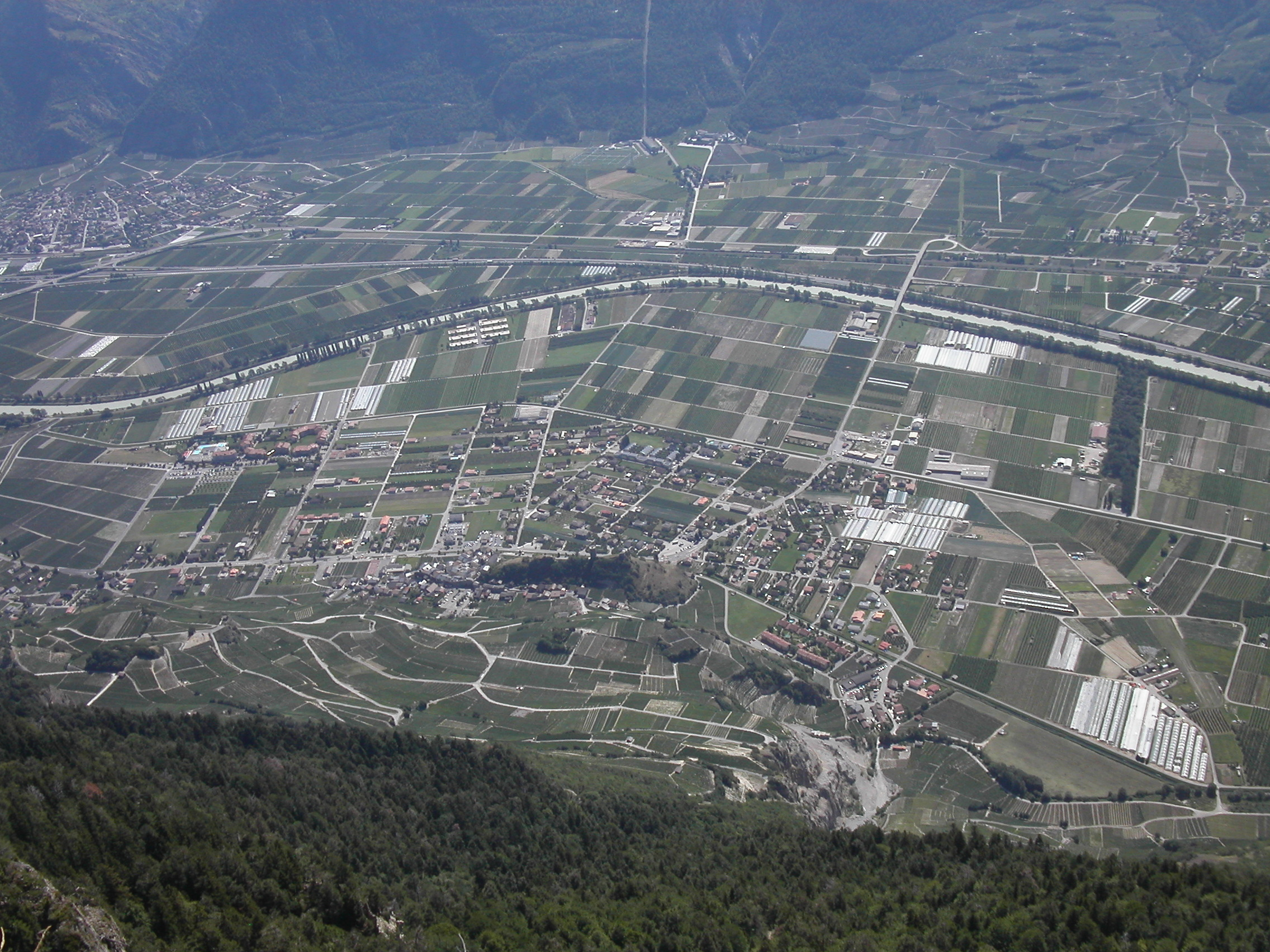
Saillon and surrounding communities

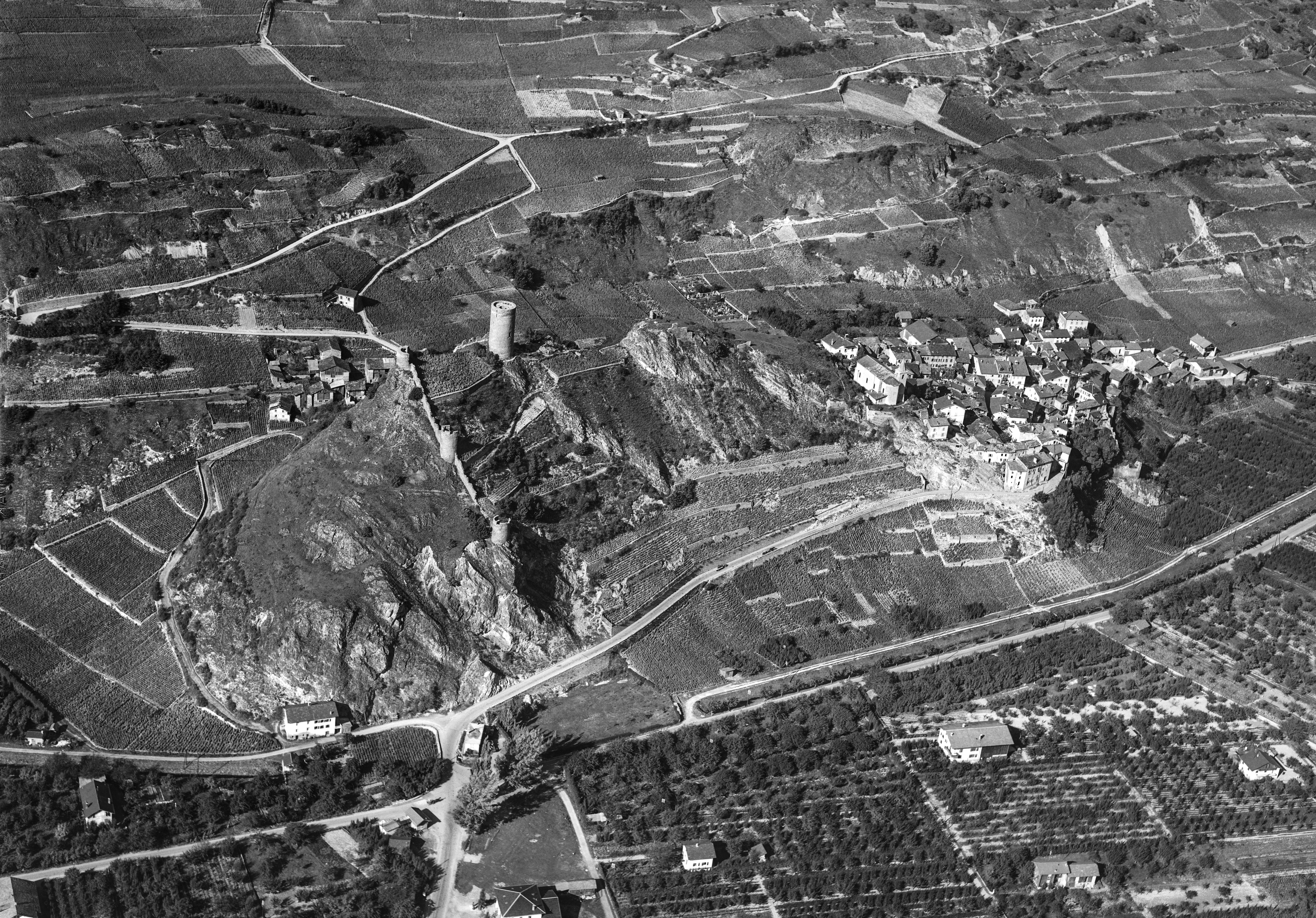
Aerial view (1955)

Saillon has an area, as of 2009, of 13.7 square kilometers (5.3 mi^{2}). Of this area, 5.17 km^{2} (2.00 mi^{2}) or 37.6% is used for agricultural purposes, while 2.81 km^{2} (1.08 mi^{2}) or 20.5% is forested. Of the rest of the land, 1.12 km^{2} (0.43 mi^{2}) or 8.2% is settled (buildings or roads), 0.31 km^{2} (0.12 mi^{2}) or 2.3% is either rivers or lakes and 4.27 km^{2} (1.65 mi^{2}) or 31.1% is unproductive land.

Of the built up area, housing and buildings made up 3.3% and transportation infrastructure made up 3.1%. Out of the forested land, 16.8% of the total land area is heavily forested and 3.1% is covered with orchards or small clusters of trees. Of the agricultural land, 6.2% is used for growing crops, while 24.2% is used for orchards or vine crops and 7.0% is used for alpine pastures. All the water in the municipality is flowing water. Of the unproductive areas, 13.2% is unproductive vegetation and 17.9% is too rocky for vegetation.

The municipality is located in the Martigny district, on the right bank of the Rhône. It consists of the village of Saillon and exclave of Euloi.

== Coat of arms ==
The blazon of the municipal coat of arms is Argent a Tower Sable.

== Demographics ==
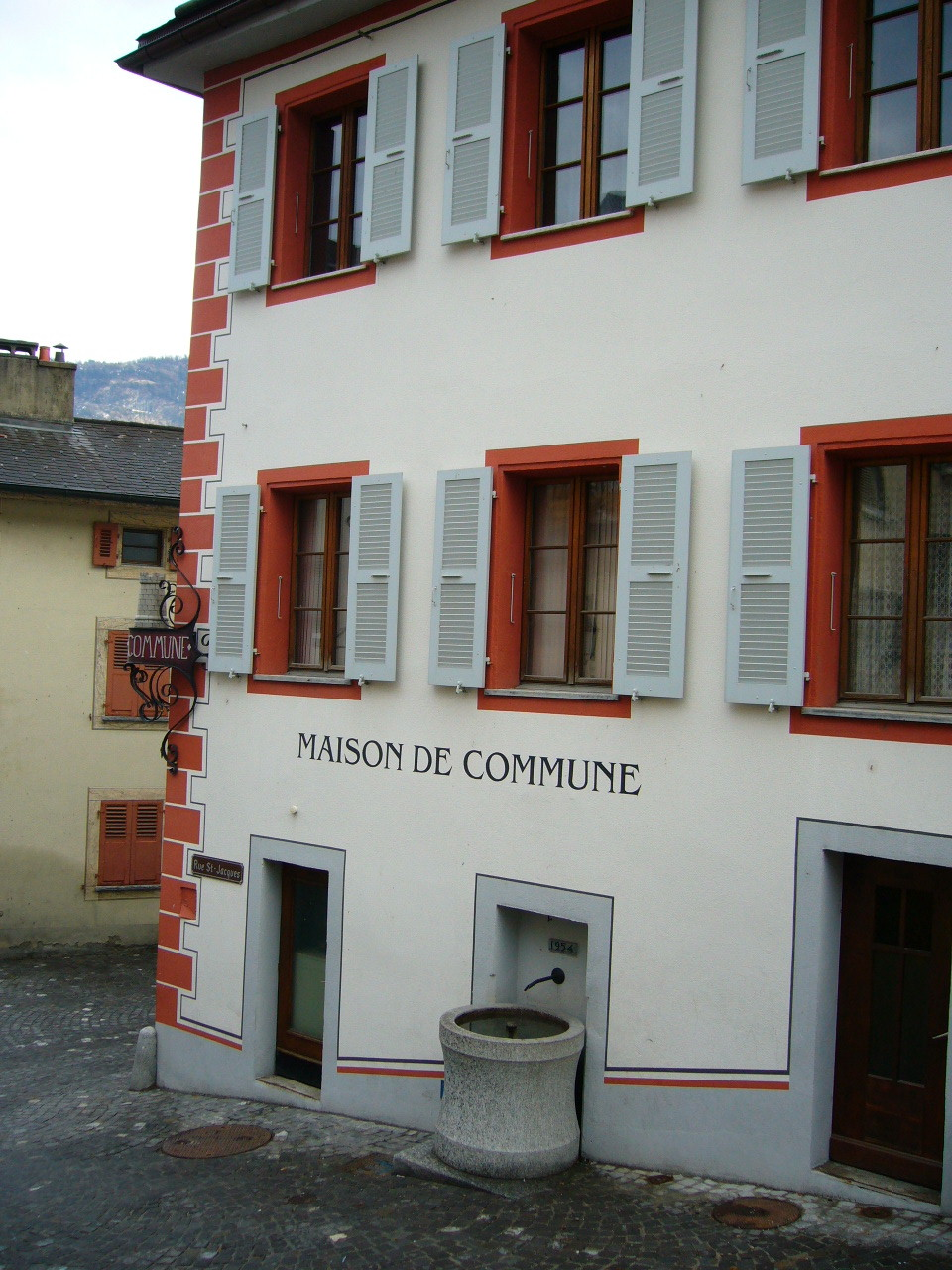
Town hall

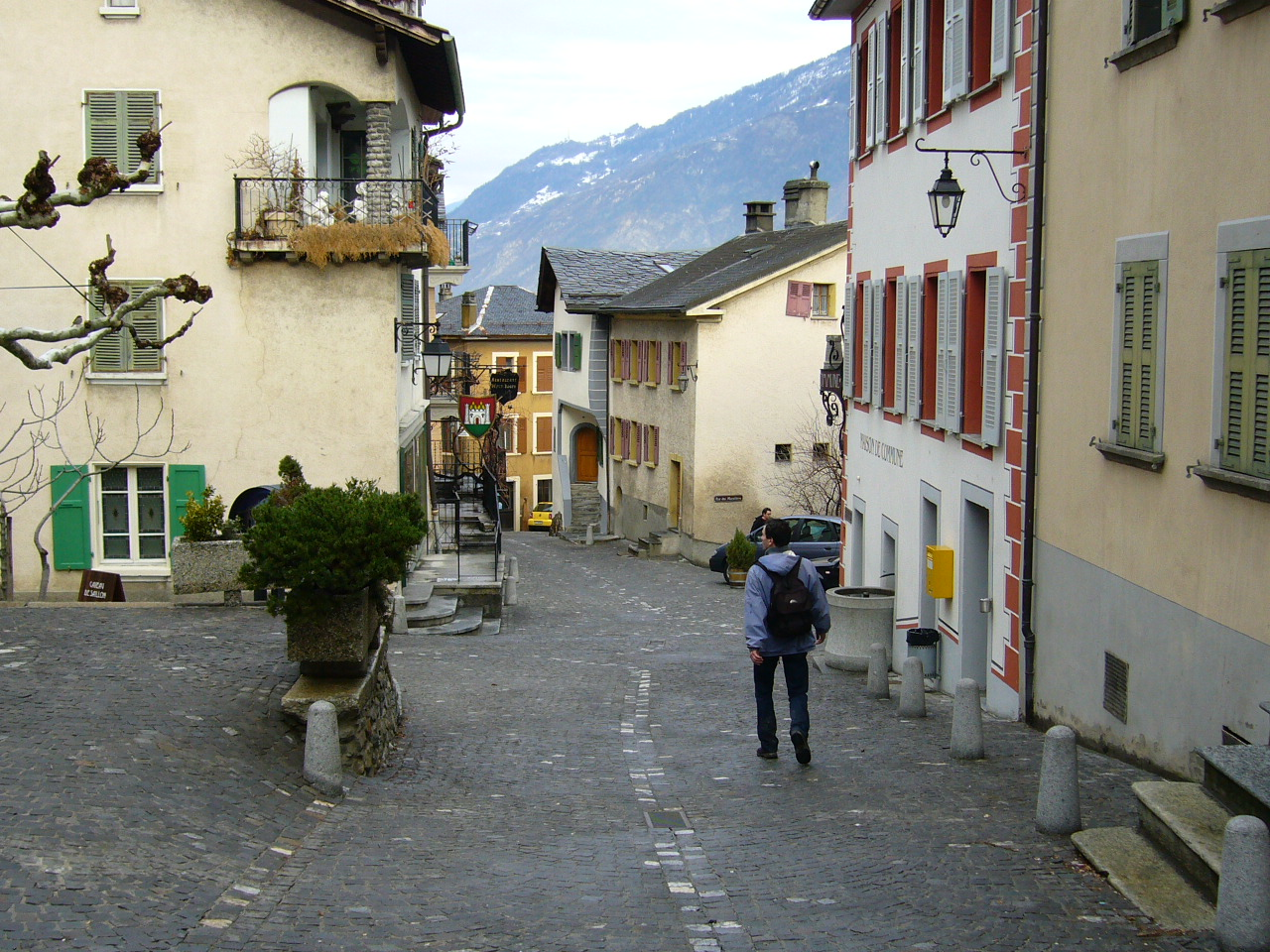
Saillon village street

Saillon has a population (as of December 2020) of 2,818. As of 2008, 19.7% of the population are resident foreign nationals. Over the last 10 years (2000–2010 ) the population has changed at a rate of 38.4%. It has changed at a rate of 34.1% due to migration and at a rate of 5.7% due to births and deaths.

Most of the population (as of 2000) speaks French (1,365 or 89.9%) as their first language, Portuguese is the second most common (85 or 5.6%) and German is the third (28 or 1.8%). There are 14 people who speak Italian.

As of 2008, the population was 50.5% male and 49.5% female. The population was made up of 815 Swiss men (39.2% of the population) and 236 (11.3%) non-Swiss men. There were 814 Swiss women (39.1%) and 215 (10.3%) non-Swiss women. Of the population in the municipality, 627 or about 41.3% were born in Saillon and lived there in 2000. There were 417 or 27.5% who were born in the same canton, while 173 or 11.4% were born somewhere else in Switzerland, and 258 or 17.0% were born outside of Switzerland.

As of 2000, children and teenagers (0–19 years old) make up 27.6% of the population, while adults (20–64 years old) make up 58.5% and seniors (over 64 years old) make up 13.9%.

As of 2000, there were 635 people who were single and never married in the municipality. There were 746 married individuals, 81 widows or widowers and 57 individuals who are divorced.

As of 2000, there were 593 private households in the municipality, and an average of 2.5 persons per household. There were 169 households that consist of only one person and 51 households with five or more people. In 2000, a total of 560 apartments (57.1% of the total) were permanently occupied, while 392 apartments (40.0%) were seasonally occupied and 28 apartments (2.9%) were empty. As of 2009, the construction rate of new housing units was 9.1 new units per 1000 residents. The vacancy rate for the municipality, in 2010, was 4.87%.

The historical population is given in the following chart:

== Heritage sites of national significance ==
The Fortifications and Bayard Tower are listed as Swiss heritage site of national significance. The entire town of Saillon is part of the Inventory of Swiss Heritage Sites.

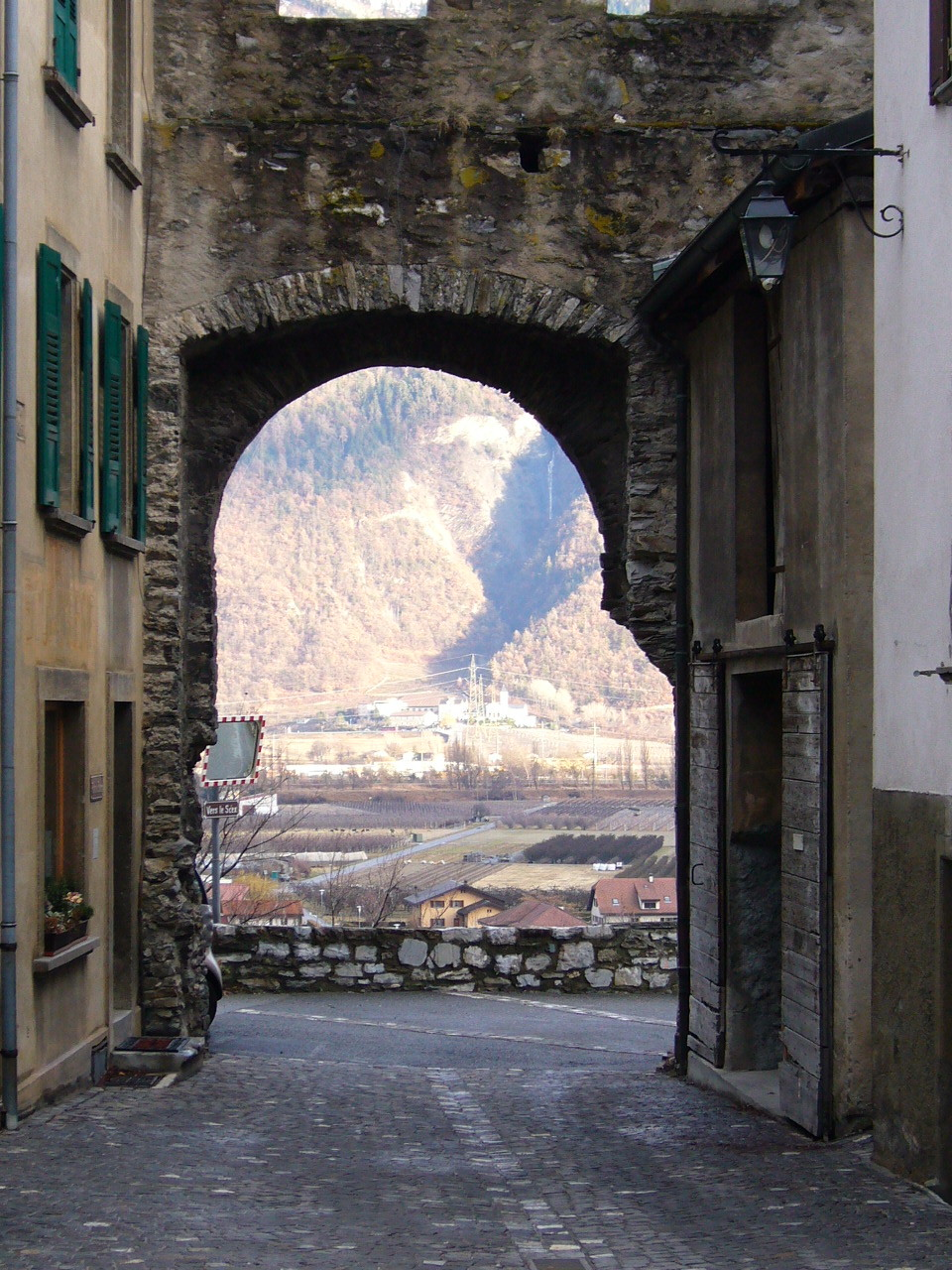
Fortifications

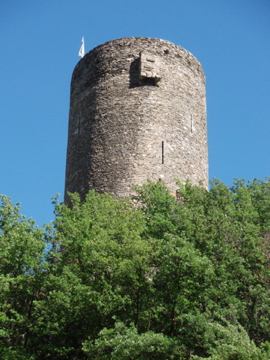
Bayard Tower

== Twin Town ==
Saillon is twinned with

- Barbentane, France

== Politics ==
In the 2007 federal election the most popular party was the CVP which received 42.17% of the vote. The next three most popular parties were the FDP (20.15%), the SVP (17.88%) and the SP (10.68%). In the federal election, a total of 710 votes were cast, and the voter turnout was 60.6%.

In the 2009 Conseil d'État/Staatsrat election a total of 695 votes were cast, of which 60 or about 8.6% were invalid. The voter participation was 55.8%, which is similar to the cantonal average of 54.67%. In the 2007 Swiss Council of States election a total of 704 votes were cast, of which 37 or about 5.3% were invalid. The voter participation was 60.4%, which is similar to the cantonal average of 59.88%.

== Economy ==
As of 2010, Saillon had an unemployment rate of 6.1%. As of 2008, there were 136 people employed in the primary economic sector and about 53 businesses involved in this sector. 101 people were employed in the secondary sector and there were 15 businesses in this sector. 368 people were employed in the tertiary sector, with 51 businesses in this sector. There were 777 residents of the municipality who were employed in some capacity, of which females made up 44.3% of the workforce.

In 2008 the total number of full-time equivalent jobs was 441. The number of jobs in the primary sector was 95, all of which were in agriculture. The number of jobs in the secondary sector was 95 of which 16 or (16.8%) were in manufacturing and 39 (41.1%) were in construction. The number of jobs in the tertiary sector was 251. In the tertiary sector; 60 or 23.9% were in wholesale or retail sales or the repair of motor vehicles, 5 or 2.0% were in the movement and storage of goods, 45 or 17.9% were in a hotel or restaurant, 6 or 2.4% were in the information industry, 4 or 1.6% were the insurance or financial industry, 4 or 1.6% were technical professionals or scientists, and 31 or 12.4% were in health care.

In 2000, there were 216 workers who commuted into the municipality and 433 workers who commuted away. The municipality is a net exporter of workers, with about 2.0 workers leaving the municipality for every one entering. Of the working population, 6% used public transportation to get to work, and 72.7% used a private car.

== Religion ==
From the 2000 census, 1,267 or 83.4% were Roman Catholic, while 88 or 5.8% belonged to the Swiss Reformed Church. Of the rest of the population, there were 2 members of an Orthodox church (or about 0.13% of the population), and there were 26 individuals (or about 1.71% of the population) who belonged to another Christian church. There were 7 (or about 0.46% of the population) who were Islamic. There were 2 individuals who were Buddhist and 7 individuals who belonged to another church. 60 (or about 3.95% of the population) belonged to no church, are agnostic or atheist, and 72 individuals (or about 4.74% of the population) did not answer the question.

== Education ==
In Saillon about 444 or (29.2%) of the population have completed non-mandatory upper secondary education, and 172 or (11.3%) have completed additional higher education (either university or a Fachhochschule). Of the 172 who completed tertiary schooling, 61.0% were Swiss men, 22.7% were Swiss women, 8.7% were non-Swiss men and 7.6% were non-Swiss women.

As of 2000, there were 2 students in Saillon who came from another municipality, while 177 residents attended schools outside the municipality.

Saillon is home to the Bibliothèque communale et scolaire library. The library has (as of 2008) 8,928 books or other media, and loaned out 8,093 items in the same year. It was open a total of 147 days with average of 6 hours per week during that year.
