= Saillon Castle =

- Saillon in Switzerland
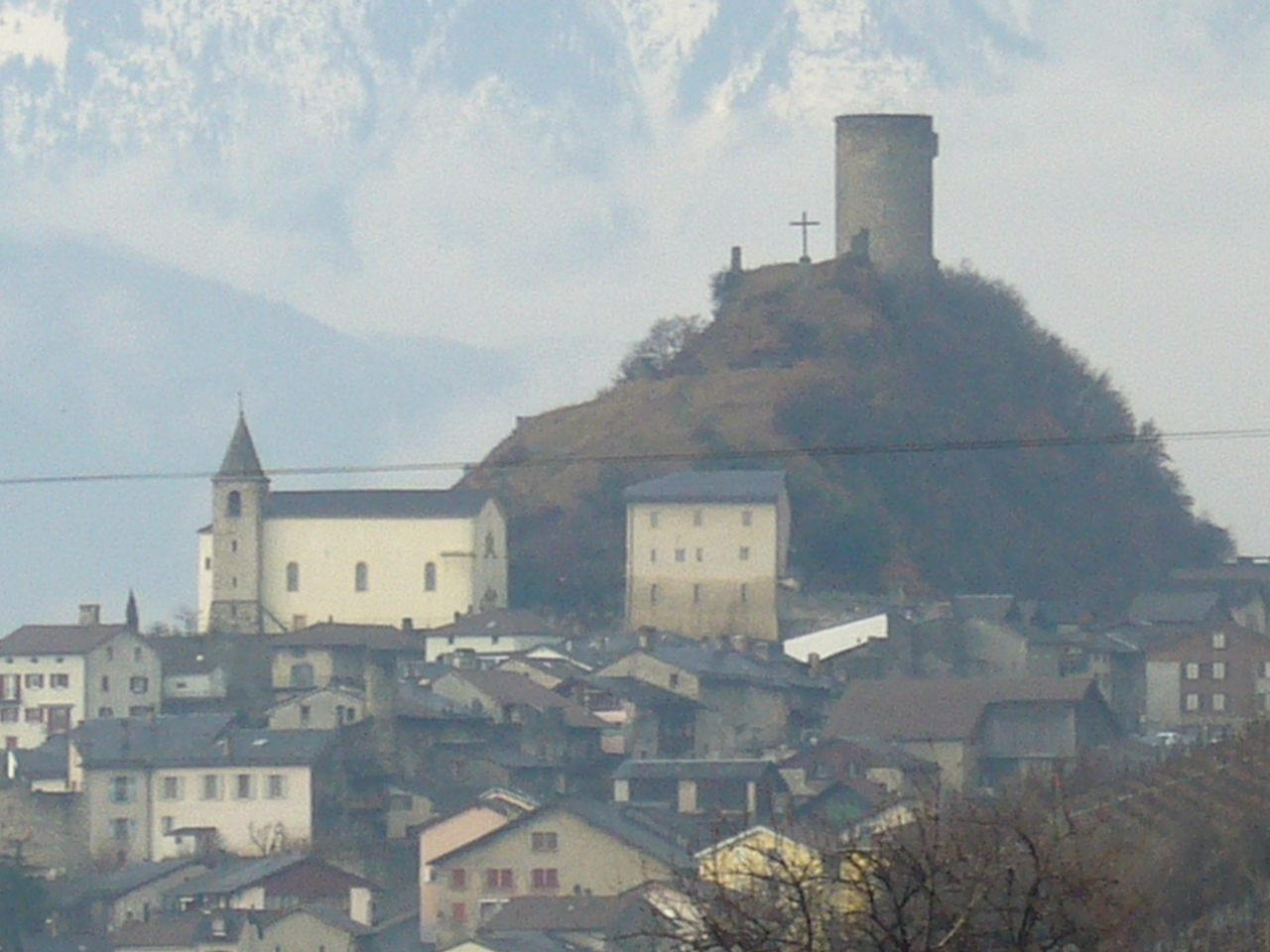
- Saillon Castle

Site information
- Condition: Ruined

Location
- Coordinates: 46°10′14″N 7°10′58″E

Site history
- Built: 1259-62

Swiss Cultural Property of National Significance

Saillon Castle or Bayard Tower is a ruined castle in the municipality of Saillon of the Canton of Valais in Switzerland. It is a Swiss heritage site of national significance.

== History ==
Saillon Castle and town in 1949

Saillon Castle is composed of several towers and walls built on a steep, rocky ridge above Saillon. There was probably a small castle on the site during the 12th century. The castle was built between 1257 and 1262 and consists of a roughly circular curtain wall which follows the contours of the ridge. On the western side the wall is strengthened by semicircular shell towers about every 30 m (98 ft). The walls stopped at the Rhone river which, at the time, protected the southern side of the castle. Today the Rhone flows a little over 1 km (0.62 mi) from the walls. There were four gates which led into the fortification. The original castle was on the western side of the ridge, but only a few traces of the walls remain.

Bayard Tower, the watch tower on top of the ridge, was built in 1259-61 by the master mason François under the direction of Pierre Mainier and Jean Mésot from Gascony.

The village of Saillon appears to have been owned by the Bishop of Sion in the 11th century. However, in the 12th century the independent Barons of Saillon appear in records. They did not remain independent for very long, becoming more and more dependent on the House of Savoy for protection against the bishops. In 1221 Thomas of Savoy acquired most of Saillon from Aymo of Pontverre, a relative of the Saillon family. In 1231 the Saillon family exchanged Saillon Castle for a Savoy fief based in Aigle Castle. Peter II of Savoy expanded Saillon into a large fortress to expand Savoy power against the bishop. Under Peter the old castle was replaced, the curtain walls added along with Bayart Tower. Peter also built several additional castles in the region including Saxon Castle which was across the valley from Saillon.

In 1384 the peasants revolted against Bishop Eduard of Savoy and attacked both the Bishop of Sion's castles as well as the Savoy castles including Saillon. Later the castle was attacked and damaged when soldiers from the German-speaking Upper Valais invaded the French Lower Valais. During the 15th century members of the Raron family sheltered in the castle during the Raron affair. In 1475 the castle was attacked and destroyed during the Burgundian Wars as the Upper Valais invaded the lower valley to fight the Duchy of Savoy who were allies of Charles the Bold. The castle building was destroyed completely though Bayard tower and the outer walls receiving less damage.

After the destruction of the castle, Saillon remained the center of a vogtei under a bailiff appointed by the victorious Upper Valais. It remained part of the vogtei until the 1798 creation of the Helvetic Republic.

== See also ==
- List of castles in Switzerland
- Château
