= Saxon Castle =

- Saxon in Switzerland
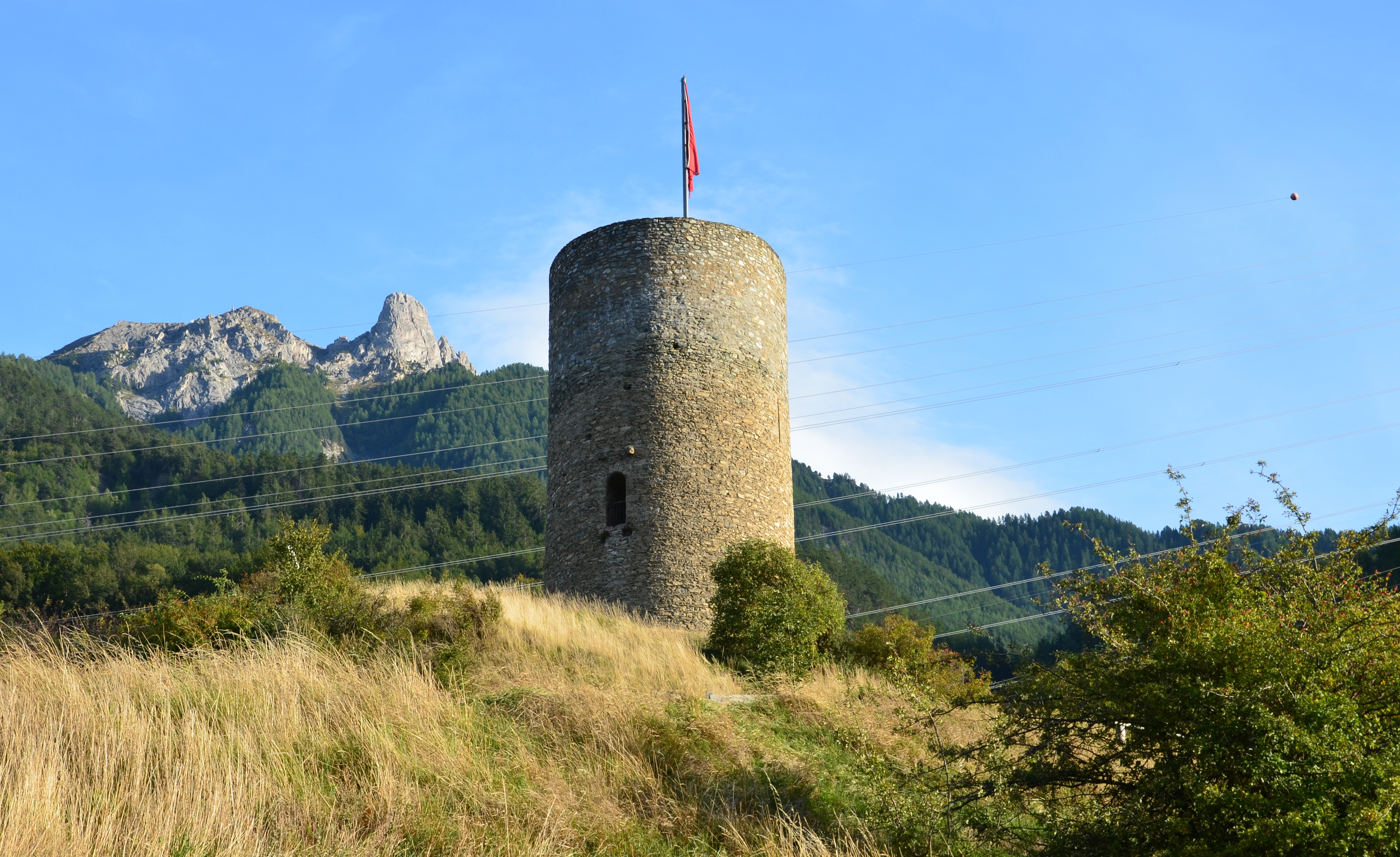
- Saxon Castle

Site information
- Condition: Ruined

Location
- Coordinates: 46°08′35″N 7°10′39″E

Site history
- Built: 1259

Saxon Castle is a ruined castle in the municipality of Saxon of the Canton of Valais in Switzerland.

== History ==
The noble Saxon family first appear in historical records from 1162 to 1178, in service to the Counts of Savoy. In 1263 Peter II of Savoy established the vogtei of Saxon-Sembrancher with the seat of the bailiff in a small tower near Saxon. In 1279 Phillip of Savoy built a large, circular tower near the existing castle to protect Savoy lands from the Bishop of Sion. This tower, together with nearby Saillon Castle guarded the valley. The bailiff of Saxon-Sembrancher moved into the tower. The outer walls and defenses were still under construction in 1284/85.

The office of Bailiff of Saxon-Sembrancher was held by the de Saxon family until their extinction in the middle of the 14th century. For the next century the office was held by various nobles as a fief of the Savoy family. During the 1475 invasion of Lower Valais during the Burgundian Wars by Upper Valais the castle was attacked and burned. While the large round tower survived, the site was abandoned and the vogtei was absorbed into the Vogtei of Saint-Maurice.

== Castle site ==
The round tower stand atop a hill about 663 meters (2,175 ft) south-west of the village. The entrance is located on the north-east of the tower about 10 m (33 ft) above ground level. It had five levels with the entrance on the second level. A small garderobe latrine projects out from the wall at the third level. The fourth level had a fireplace and the fifth was probably covered with a conical wooden roof and had wooden hoardings projecting out from the walls.

The castle site can be divided into two parts. The upper castle consisted of the large, round tower protected by a zwinger or kill zone. There was a large rectangular gatehouse on the north end and a residential building at the south. The lower castle consisted of the walls that surrounded the castle village, along with a chapel and another gate house. The chapel is one of the oldest buildings in the Canton of Valais. The Romanesque nave was built in the 12th century. The chapel was restored in 1965.

== See also ==
- List of castles in Switzerland
- Château
