= Agglomeration community of Pays d'Aubagne et de l'Étoile =

Coordinates: 43°18′N 5°33′E

Pays d'Aubagne et de l’Étoile
- Former communauté d'agglomération
- Country: France
- Region: Provence-Alpes-Côte d'Azur
- Department: Bouches-du-Rhône, Var
- No. of communes: {{{nbcomm}}}
- Established: 1 January 2007
- Disbanded: 2016
- Area: 244.7 km^{2} (94.5 sq mi)
- Population (2009): 104,018
  - Density: 425.1/km^{2} (1,101/sq mi)

The Agglomeration community of Pays d'Aubagne et de l'Étoile (French: Communauté d'agglomération du pays d'Aubagne et de l'Étoile, pronounced [kɔmynote daɡlɔmeʁasjɔ̃ dy pei dobaɲ e də letwal]) is a former intercommunal structure joining the communes near Aubagne in the Bouches-du-Rhône and Var departments in the Provence-Alpes-Côte d'Azur region of Southeastern France. It was created in December 1999. On 1 January 2016 it became a territory in the Aix-Marseille-Provence Metropolis.

== Origins ==
It was formed 1 January 2007 after the dissolution of the Communauté de communes de l'Étoile-Merlançon and the five associated communes joined the Agglomeration community of Garlaban-Huveaune-Sainte-Baume forming the new Agglomeration community of Pays d'Aubagne et de l'Étoile.

== Communes ==
Twelve communes belonged to this agglomeration community, eleven within the Bouches-du-Rhône and one in the Var:

- Bouches-du-Rhône:
  - Aubagne
  - Auriol
  - Belcodène
  - Cadolive
  - Cuges-les-Pins
  - La Bouilladisse
  - La Destrousse
  - La Penne-sur-Huveaune
  - Peypin
  - Roquevaire
  - Saint-Savournin
- one commune from the department of Var:
  - Saint-Zacharie

== Skills ==
The local powers of the agglomeration are:

- Economic development,
- Tourism
- Transport network with the free Bus de l'Agglo
- Urban planning,
- Housing and public facilities,
- Waste disposal and sanitation
- Agriculture and forestry.

== Introduction ==
The country around Aubagne has many industries and commercial areas. It is mainly located in a tourist region of Provence, in the heart of a triangle formed by Marseille, Aix-en-Provence and Toulon.

The hills of Pagnol and the landscapes of Cézanne depict the hectic daily life of its inhabitants, while in the vicinity are other sites such as the Calanques or inlets from Marseille to La Ciotat through Cassis, and the Sainte-Baume mountain range.

== Budget and Taxation ==
- Total operating revenues: €66,835,000 or €641 per capita
- Total capital resources: €22,867,000, or €219 per capita
- Debt: €13,607,000 or €131 per capita.

== The Guérini Affair ==
On 14 January 2011, Alain Belviso, the elected PCF and president of the communauté d'agglomération du pays d'Aubagne et de l'Étoile, was indicted for embezzlement of public funds. He was the first elected official implicated in this case. He was released on bail under judicial control, then he resigned his office of alderman in February 2011 and left his position as president of the agglomeration.
