= Canton of Marseille-Les Trois Lucs =

Coordinates: 43°17′47″N 5°22′12″E

Marseille-Les Trois Lucs
- Former canton
- Interactive map of Marseille-Les Trois Lucs
- Country: France
- Region: Provence-Alpes-Côte d'Azur
- Department: Bouches-du-Rhône
- No. of communes: {{{nbcomm}}}
- Disbanded: 2015
- Population (2012): 30,968

Canton of Marseille-Les Trois Lucs is a former canton located within the commune of Marseille in the Bouches-du-Rhône department of France. It was created 27 February 2003 by the decree 2003-156 of that date. It was disbanded following the French canton reorganisation which came into effect in March 2015. Its population was 30,968 in 2012.

Elected to represent the canton in the General Council of Bouches-du-Rhône:

- Christophe Masse (PS, 2001-2008)

== Area ==
It is composed of the part of the 11th arrondissement of Marseille not within the cantons of Marseille-La Pomme and Marseille - Saint-Marcel and the part of the 12th arrondissement of Marseille not included in the cantons of Marseille-La Blancarde, Marseille-Montolivet and Marseille - Saint-Marcel.

== See also ==
- Arrondissement of Marseille
- Cantons of the Bouches-du-Rhône department
- Communes of the Bouches-du-Rhône department
