= Canton of Roquevaire =

Coordinates: 43°21′00″N 5°36′19″E

Roquevaire
- Former canton
- Interactive map of Roquevaire
- Country: France
- Region: Provence-Alpes-Côte d'Azur
- Department: Bouches-du-Rhône
- No. of communes: {{{nbcomm}}}
- Disbanded: 2015
- Population (2012): 46,105

The Canton of Roquevaire is a former canton located within the Bouches-du-Rhône department of France. It had 46,105 inhabitants (2012). It was disbanded following the French canton reorganisation which came into effect in March 2015.

Elected to represent the canton in the General Council of Bouches-du-Rhône:

- Francis Pellissier (PC, 2001–2008)

== Area ==
It was composed of the communes Auriol, Belcodène, La Bouilladisse, Cadolive, La Destrousse, Gréasque, Peypin, Roquevaire and Saint-Savournin.

== See also ==
- Arrondissement of Marseille
- Cantons of the Bouches-du-Rhône department
- Communes of the Bouches-du-Rhône department
