= Canton of Marseille-Belsunce =

Coordinates: 43°17′47″N 5°22′12″E

Marseille-Belsunce
- Former canton
- Interactive map of Marseille-Belsunce
- Country: France
- Region: Provence-Alpes-Côte d'Azur
- Department: Bouches-du-Rhône
- No. of communes: {{{nbcomm}}}
- Disbanded: 2015
- Population (2012): 28,724

Canton of Marseille-Belsunce (French: canton de Marseille-Belsunce; Occitan: canton de Marselha e Belsunce) is a former canton located within the commune of Marseille, Bouches-du-Rhône department, France. It was created 27 February 2003 by the decree 2003-156 of that date. It was disbanded following the French canton reorganisation which came into effect in March 2015. Its population was 28,724 in 2012.

Elected to represent the canton in the General Council of Bouches-du-Rhône:

- Fortuné Sportiello (PS, 2001-2008)

== Area ==
It is composed of the part of the 1st arrondissement of Marseille not included in the cantons of Marseille-Les Grands-Carmes and Marseille-Les Cinq-Avenues as well as the remaining part of the 7th arrondissement of Marseille not included in the canton of Marseille - Saint-Lambert.

== See also ==
- Arrondissement of Marseille
- Cantons of the Bouches-du-Rhône department
- Communes of the Bouches-du-Rhône department
