= Canton of Marseille-Montolivet =

Coordinates: 43°17′47″N 5°22′12″E

Marseille-Montolivet
- Former canton
- Interactive map of Marseille-Montolivet
- Country: France
- Region: Provence-Alpes-Côte d'Azur
- Department: Bouches-du-Rhône
- No. of communes: {{{nbcomm}}}
- Disbanded: 2015
- Population (2012): 34,274

Canton of Marseille-Montolivet is a former canton located within the commune of Marseille in the Bouches-du-Rhône department of France. It was created 27 February 2003 by the decree 2003-156 of that date. It was disbanded following the French canton reorganisation which came into effect in March 2015. Its population was 34,274 in 2012.

Elected to represent the canton in the General Council of Bouches-du-Rhône:

- Maurice Rey (UMP, 2001-2008)

== Area ==
It is composed of the part of the 12th municipal arrondissement of Marseille not included in the Canton of Marseille-La Blancarde and situated west of an imaginary line along chemin de la Parette and the walking path that extend from it (traverse Gaston-de-Flotte) from the border with the 11th municipal arrondissement until avenue Van-Gogh. It then continues along avenue de la Fourragère, avenue des Caillols, avenue de la Figonne, traverse de Courtrai, traverse du Fort-Fouque, avenue du 24-avril-1915, rue Pierre-Béranger, traverse des Massaliottes, chemin des Sables, rue de Charleroi, boulevard des Fauvettes, boulevard Pinatel, chemin des Amaryllis and finally rue Charles-Kaddouz until it meets the 13th municipal arrondissement.

== See also ==
- Arrondissement of Marseille
- Cantons of the Bouches-du-Rhône department
- Communes of the Bouches-du-Rhône department
