= Canton of Marseille – Saint-Barthélemy =

Coordinates: 43°17′47″N 5°22′12″E

Marseille - Saint-Barthélemy
- Former canton
- Interactive map of Marseille - Saint-Barthélemy
- Country: France
- Region: Provence-Alpes-Côte d'Azur
- Department: Bouches-du-Rhône
- No. of communes: {{{nbcomm}}}
- Disbanded: 2015
- Population (2012): 41,363

Canton of Marseille – Saint-Barthélemy is a former canton located within the commune of Marseille in the Bouches-du-Rhône department of France. It was created 27 February 2003 by the decree 2003-156 of that date. It was disbanded following the French canton reorganisation which came into effect in March 2015. Its population was 41,363 in 2012.

Elected to represent the canton in the General Council of Bouches-du-Rhône:

- Denis Rossi (PS, 2001-2008)

== Area ==
It was composed of the part of the 14th municipal arrondissement of Marseille not included within the cantons of Marseille - Saint-Just and Marseille - Notre-Dame-Limite.

== See also ==
- Arrondissement of Marseille
- Cantons of the Bouches-du-Rhône department
- Communes of the Bouches-du-Rhône department
