= Canton of Marseille – Saint-Giniez =

Coordinates: 43°17′47″N 5°22′12″E

Marseille - Saint-Giniez
- Former canton
- Interactive map of Marseille - Saint-Giniez
- Country: France
- Region: Provence-Alpes-Côte d'Azur
- Department: Bouches-du-Rhône
- No. of communes: {{{nbcomm}}}
- Disbanded: 2015
- Population (2012): 36,139

Canton of Marseille – Saint-Giniez is a former canton located within the commune of Marseille in the Bouches-du-Rhône department, in the Provence-Alpes-Côte d'Azur region of France.

== History ==
It was created 27 February 2003 by the decree 2003-156 of that date. It was disbanded following the French canton reorganisation which came into effect in March 2015.

== Population ==
Its population was 36,139 in 2012.

== Mayor ==
Elected to represent the canton in the General Council of Bouches-du-Rhône:

- Martine Vassal (UMP, 2001–2008)

== Area ==
It is composed of the part of the 8th arrondissement of Marseille not within the cantons of Marseille-Vauban and Marseille-La Pointe-Rouge.

== See also ==
- Arrondissement of Marseille
- Cantons of the Bouches-du-Rhône department
- Communes of the Bouches-du-Rhône department
