= Canton of Aubagne-Ouest =

Coordinates: 43°17′27″N 5°34′15″E

Aubagne-Ouest
- Former canton
- Interactive map of Aubagne-Ouest
- Country: France
- Region: Provence-Alpes-Côte d'Azur
- Department: Bouches-du-Rhône
- No. of communes: {{{nbcomm}}}
- Disbanded: 2015
- Population (2012): 41,357

The Canton of Aubagne-Ouest is a canton located within the administrative department of Bouches-du-Rhône in southern France. It was created 27 February 2003 by the decree 2003-156 of that date. It had 41,357 inhabitants (2012). It was disbanded following the French canton reorganisation which came into effect in March 2015. It consisted of 2 communes, which joined the new canton of Aubagne in 2015.

Elected to represent the canton in the General Council of Bouches-du-Rhône:

- Daniel Fontaine (PC, 2001–2008)

== Area ==
It was composed of the western half of Aubagne not included in the Canton of Aubagne-Est as well as the commune of La Penne-sur-Huveaune.

== See also ==
- Arrondissement of Marseille
- Cantons of the Bouches-du-Rhône department
- Communes of the Bouches-du-Rhône department
