= Canton of Marseille-La Pomme =

Coordinates: 43°17′47″N 5°22′12″E

Marseille-La Pomme
- Former canton
- Interactive map of Marseille-La Pomme
- Country: France
- Region: Provence-Alpes-Côte d'Azur
- Department: Bouches-du-Rhône
- No. of communes: {{{nbcomm}}}
- Disbanded: 2015
- Population (2012): 38,374

Canton of Marseille-La Pomme is a former canton located within the commune of Marseille in the Bouches-du-Rhône department of France. It was created 27 February 2003 by the decree 2003-156 of that date. It was disbanded following the French canton reorganisation which came into effect in March 2015. Its population was 38,374 in 2012.

Elected to represent the canton in the General Council of Bouches-du-Rhône:

- René Olmeta (PS, 2001-2008)

== Area ==
It is composed of the part of the 10th arrondissement of Marseille not within the Canton of Marseille-La Capelette and the area of the 11th arrondissement situated west of avenue William-Booth (from the border of the 12th arrondissement), avenue Bernard-Lecache, boulevard de la Pomme, avenue Emmanuel-Allard, avenue du Docteur-Heckel, boulevard de la Valbarelle, avenue de Montélimar, avenue de Tarascon, avenue du Pontet, chemin de la Valbarelle à Saint-Marcel, traverse des Pionniers, canal de Marseille, boulevard des Olivettes, boulevard du Parasol, boulevard du Plateau and traverse de la Haute-Granière and the roads that continue from until they arrive at the 10th arrondissement.

== See also ==
- Arrondissement of Marseille
- Cantons of the Bouches-du-Rhône department
- Communes of the Bouches-du-Rhône department
