= Canton of Marseille – Saint-Marcel =

Coordinates: 43°17′47″N 5°22′12″E

Marseille - Saint-Marcel
- Former canton
- Interactive map of Marseille - Saint-Marcel
- Country: France
- Region: Provence-Alpes-Côte d'Azur
- Department: Bouches-du-Rhône
- No. of communes: {{{nbcomm}}}
- Disbanded: 2015
- Population (2012): 31,649

Canton of Marseille – Saint-Marcel is a former canton located within the commune of Marseille in the Bouches-du-Rhône department of France. It was created 27 February 2003 by the decree 2003-156 of that date. It was disbanded following the French canton reorganisation which came into effect in March 2015. Its population was 31,649 in 2012.

Elected to represent the canton in the General Council of Bouches-du-Rhône:

- Jean Bonat (PS, 2001-2008)

== Area ==
It is composed of the part of the 11th arrondissement of Marseille not within the cantons of Marseille-La Pomme and situated south of an imaginary line along the following roads: avenue des Peintres-Roux, route de la Sablière, traverse de la Sablière, avenue de Saint-Menet (excluded). The canton also comprises an area of the 12th arrondissement situated southeast of a line defined by the following roads: avenue Saint-Jean-du-Désert (excluded), allée de la Grande-Bastide-Cazaux (excluded), La Bastide-Neuve (excluded), avenue des Caillols (excluded), boulevard des Libérateurs and traverse de La Martine.

== See also ==
- Arrondissement of Marseille
- Cantons of the Bouches-du-Rhône department
- Communes of the Bouches-du-Rhône department
