= Canton of Marseille – Sainte-Marguerite =

Coordinates: 43°17′47″N 5°22′12″E

Marseille - Sainte-Marguerite
- Former canton
- Interactive map of Marseille - Sainte-Marguerite
- Country: France
- Region: Provence-Alpes-Côte d'Azur
- Department: Bouches-du-Rhône
- No. of communes: {{{nbcomm}}}
- Disbanded: 2015
- Population (2012): 36,125

Canton of Marseille – Sainte-Marguerite is a former canton of France, located within the commune of Marseille in the Bouches-du-Rhône department, in the Provence-Alpes-Côte d'Azur region. It was created 27 February 2003 by the decree 2003-156 of that date. It was disbanded following the French canton reorganisation which came into effect in March 2015. Its population was 36,125 in 2012.

Elected to represent the canton in the General Council of Bouches-du-Rhône:

- Didier Garnier (UMP, 2001–2008)

== Area ==
It is composed of the part of the 9th municipal arrondissement of Marseille not within the Canton of Marseille-Mazargues.

== See also ==
- Arrondissement of Marseille
- Cantons of the Bouches-du-Rhône department
- Communes of the Bouches-du-Rhône department
