= 10th arrondissement of Marseille =

- Municipal arrondissement
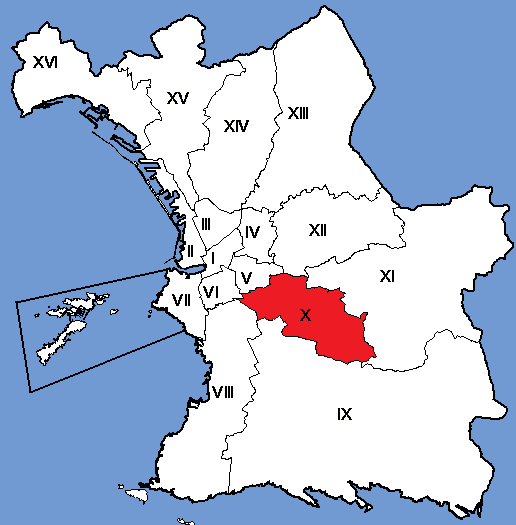
- Location within Marseille
- Interactive map of 10th arrondissement of Marseille
- Coordinates: 43.2733°N 5.4306°E
- Country: France
- Region: Provence-Alpes-Côte d'Azur
- Department: Bouches-du-Rhône
- Commune: Marseille

Government
  - Mayor (2026–2032): Eléonore Bez (Rassemblement national)
- Area: 10.84 km^{2} (4.19 sq mi)
- Population (2023): 60,317
  - Density: 5,564/km^{2} (14,410/sq mi)
- INSEE code: 13210

The 10th arrondissement of Marseille is a district (arrondissement) in the city of Marseille. The district is located east of the city. It borders the 5th and 12th arrondissement in the north, the 11th in the east, the 9th in the south, the 8th in the southwest and the 6th in the west. It is governed locally together with the 9th arrondissement, with which it forms the 5th sector of Marseille.

== Neighbourhoods ==
The 10th arrondissement of Marseille includes six neighbourhoods (quartiers): la Capelette, Menpenti, Pont-de-Vivaux, Saint-Loup, Saint-Tronc, and La Timone and 25 IRIS including 24 IRIS housing and Prado Park.

== Public transport ==
The Capelette neighbourhood is very poorly served by public transport. Only the number 18 line from Saint-Loup to Castellane passes through Capelette.

== Important monuments ==
The Capelette district, named after the disused Capeletto chapel on Bonnefoy Boulevard, has a railroad bridge that crosses the avenue, as well as the church of St Laurent on St Jean Boulevard. It also has a beautiful garden called the Garden of Guy Azaïs.

== Demography ==
Historical population
| Year | Pop. | ±% p.a. |
|---|---|---|
| 1968 | 49,363 | — |
| 1975 | 55,260 | +1.63% |
| 1982 | 54,093 | −0.30% |
| 1990 | 50,079 | −0.96% |
| 1999 | 49,133 | −0.21% |
| 2007 | 51,299 | +0.54% |
| 2012 | 54,279 | +1.14% |
| 2017 | 56,138 | +0.68% |
| 2023 | 60,317 | +1.20% |
Source: INSEE

| Neighbourhood | Population (2022) |
|---|---|
| La Capelette | 13,324 |
| Menpenti | 4,234 |
| Pont-de-Vivaux | 6,654 |
| Saint-Loup | 15,413 |
| Saint-Tronc | 14,659 |
| la Timone | 5,564 |

=== Education and training by neighbourhood in 2006 ===
Non-graduation and graduates rates by area at January 1, 2006
| Neighbourhood | 15+ years of schooling | total without diplomas | % with diplomas | total with 3 or more BAC | % with three or moreBAC |
|---|---|---|---|---|---|
| La Capelette | 6 152 | 1 563 | 25.41% | 492 | 8.00% |
| Menpenti | 2 257 | 471 | 20.86% | 212 | 9.40% |
| Pont-de-Vivaux | 3 004 | 1 006 | 33.49% | 280 | 9.32% |
| Saint-Loup | 11 019 | 2 611 | 23.70% | 787 | 7.14% |
| Saint-Tronc | 10 033 | 2 137 | 21.30% | 941 | 9.38% |
| La Timone | 3 760 | 662 | 17.60% | 369 | 9.82% |
| Arrondissement | 36 225 | 8 451 | 23.33% | 3 081 | 8.51% |
| Total Marseille | 590 908 | 149 305 | 25.27% | 79 435 | 13.44% |

=== Unemployment rates by neighborhoods in 2006 ===
| Neighbourhood | Workforce | Number unemployed | Unemployment rate |
|---|---|---|---|
| La Capelette | 3 920 | 615 | 15,69% |
| Menpenti | 1 455 | 268 | 18,44% |
| Pont-de-Vivaux | 1 703 | 228 | 13,36% |
| Saint-Loup | 6 507 | 1 000 | 15,37% |
| Saint-Tronc | 5 914 | 854 | 14,44% |
| La Timone | 2 615 | 357 | 13,66% |
| Arrondissement | 22 114 | 3 322 | 15,02% |
| Total Marseille | 352 855 | 64 330 | 18,23% |

=== Beneficiaries of supplementary universal health coverage (CMU-C) by neighbourhood ===
Supplementary CMU (CMU-C) is a free complementary health plan that covers what is not covered by compulsory health insurance schemes.

Beneficiaries of the CMU-C by IRIS in 2008

| Neighbourhood | Population covered in 2008 | Beneficiaries CMU-C 2008 | % beneficiaries 2008 |
|---|---|---|---|
| La Capelette | 7 687 | 963 | 12,53% |
| Menpenti | 3 253 | 470 | 14,45% |
| Pont-de-Vivaux | 3 925 | 644 | 16,41% |
| Saint-Loup | 12 287 | 1 087 | 8,85% |
| Saint-Tronc | 10 639 | 1 127 | 10,59% |
| La Timone | 3 497 | 302 | 8,64% |
| Arrondissement | 42 518 | 4 472 | 11,15% |
| Total Marseille | 718 664 | 132 156 | 18,39% |

=== Families by neighbourhood in 2006 ===
Single parent families and families with four children at 1 January 2006

| Neighbourhood | Families | with single parents | % single parent families | families with 4 or more children | % families with 4 or more children |
|---|---|---|---|---|---|
| La Capelette | 1 924 | 474 | 24.64% | 42 | 2.18% |
| Menpenti | 737 | 141 | 19.14% | 17 | 2.36% |
| Pont-de-Vivaux | 1 108 | 287 | 25.89% | 49 | 4.40% |
| Saint-Loup | 4 243 | 888 | 20.93% | 121 | 2.85% |
| Saint-Tronc | 3 644 | 717 | 19.67% | 132 | 3.62% |
| La Timone | 1 440 | 219 | 15.22% | 33 | 2.28% |
| Total arrondissement | 13 096 | 2 726 | 20.82% | 394 | 3.01% |
| Total Marseille | 213 538 | 46 568 | 21.81% | 8 414 | 3.94% |

=== Dwellings by neighbourhood 8/3/1999 ===
| Neighbourhood | % tenants | % apartment buildings | % 4 or more rooms |
|---|---|---|---|
| La Capelette | 62,76% | 90,14% | 25,27% |
| Menpenti | 57,19% | 90,98% | 20,03% |
| Pont-de-Vivaux | 40,99% | 68,16% | 32,30% |
| Saint-Loup | 47,38% | 72,10% | 54,84% |
| Saint-Tronc | 33,80% | 92,81% | 45,74% |
| La Timone | 48,67% | 84,28% | 35,47% |
| Arrondissement | 46,82% | 83,46% | 40,53% |
| Total Marseille | 51,73% | 82,86% | 38,21% |

=== Population of the neighbourhoods by age at 8/3/1999 ===
| Quartier | % 0-19 years | % 20-39 years | % 40-59 years | % 60-74 years | % 75 years and + |
|---|---|---|---|---|---|
| La Capelette | 20,32% | 33,86% | 24,64% | 13,62% | 7,56% |
| Menpenti | 16,22% | 34,11% | 24,37% | 15,67% | 9,62% |
| Pont-de-Vivaux | 23,74% | 24,94% | 24,43% | 16,27% | 10,63% |
| Saint-Loup | 25,21% | 25,02% | 27,05% | 15,16% | 7,55% |
| Saint-Tronc | 24,36% | 25,88% | 25,31% | 16,37% | 8,08% |
| La Timone | 21,39% | 35,24% | 24,97% | 11,31% | 7,09% |
| Arrondissement | 23,16% | 28,24% | 25,58% | 15,00% | 8,02% |
| Total Marseille | 23,16% | 28,67% | 24,84% | 14,18% | 9,16% |
