= Canton of Marseille – Notre-Dame-Limite =

Coordinates: 43°17′47″N 5°22′12″E

Marseille - Notre-Dame-Limite
- Former canton
- Interactive map of Marseille - Notre-Dame-Limite
- Country: France
- Region: Provence-Alpes-Côte d'Azur
- Department: Bouches-du-Rhône
- No. of communes: {{{nbcomm}}}
- Disbanded: 2015
- Population (2012): 35,163

Canton of Marseille – Notre-Dame-Limite is a former canton located within the commune of Marseille in the Bouches-du-Rhône department of France. It was created on 27 February 2003 by decree 2003-156 of that date. It was disbanded following the French canton reorganisation which came into effect in March 2015. Its population was 35,163 in 2012.

Elected to represent the canton in the General Council of Bouches-du-Rhône:

- Joël Dutto (PC, 2001-2008)

== Area ==
It is composed of the part of the 14th municipal arrondissement of Marseille situated north-west of avenue du Marché-National, rue Jean-Queillau, chemin de Saint-Joseph à Sainte-Marthe, cité Saint-Joseph, boulevard Roland-Dorgelès, cité Les Micocouliers, boulevard Roland-Dorgelès, chemin du Petit-Fontainieu and traverse des Arcades. It also includes the part of the 15th municipal arrondissement not part of the cantons of Marseille-Verduron and Marseille - Saint-Mauront.

== See also ==
- Arrondissement of Marseille
- Cantons of the Bouches-du-Rhône department
- Communes of the Bouches-du-Rhône department
