= Canton of Marseille – Saint-Mauront =

Coordinates: 43°17′47″N 5°22′12″E

Marseille - Saint-Mauront
- Former canton
- Interactive map of Marseille - Saint-Mauront
- Country: France
- Region: Provence-Alpes-Côte d'Azur
- Department: Bouches-du-Rhône
- No. of communes: {{{nbcomm}}}
- Disbanded: 2015
- Population (2012): 47,076

Canton of Marseille – Saint-Mauront is a former canton located within the commune of Marseille in the Bouches-du-Rhône department of France. It was created 27 February 2003 by the decree 2003-156 of that date. It was disbanded following the French canton reorganisation which came into effect in March 2015. Its population was 47,076 in 2012.

Elected to represent the canton in the General Council of Bouches-du-Rhône:

- Jeanine Porte (PS, 2001-2008)

== Area ==
It is composed of the part of the 3rd arrondissement of Marseille not within the Canton of Marseille-La Belle-de-Mai and the area of the 15th arrondissement not included in the Canton of Marseille-Verduron and situated west of an imaginary line along rue René-d'Anjou, boulevard de la Padouane, traverse de l'Oasis, avenue des Aygalades, rue Le Chatelier, allée de la Montagnette, chemin des Brugas and the A7 autoroute until it meets the 14th arrondissement.

== See also ==
- Arrondissement of Marseille
- Cantons of the Bouches-du-Rhône department
- Communes of the Bouches-du-Rhône department
