= Canton of Marseille-La Rose =

Coordinates: 43°17′47″N 5°22′12″E

Marseille-La Rose
- Former canton
- Interactive map of Marseille-La Rose
- Country: France
- Region: Provence-Alpes-Côte d'Azur
- Department: Bouches-du-Rhône
- No. of communes: {{{nbcomm}}}
- Disbanded: 2015
- Population (2012): 35,166

Canton of Marseille-La Rose is a former canton located within the commune of Marseille in the Bouches-du-Rhône department of France. It was created 27 February 2003 by the decree 2003-156 of that date. It was disbanded following the French canton reorganisation which came into effect in March 2015. Its population was 35,166 in 2012.

Elected to represent the canton in the General Council of Bouches-du-Rhône:

- Félix Weygand (PS, 2001–2008)

== Area ==
It is composed of the part of the 13th arrondissement of Marseille not within the canton of Marseille - Saint-Just and situated south-west of an imaginary line composed of chemin des Grives, chemin de la Télévision, chemin de la Bastide-Longue, avenue de Château-Gombert, chemin de Notre-Dame-de-la-Consolation, chemin de la Rose-à-la-Grave, impasse Guillermin, boulevard Neuf, avenue de la Croix-Rouge, avenue des Olives and boulevard de la Comtesse until it meets the 12th arrondissement of Marseille.

== See also ==
- Arrondissement of Marseille
- Cantons of the Bouches-du-Rhône department
- Communes of the Bouches-du-Rhône department
