= Canton of Marseille-La Capelette =

Coordinates: 43°17′47″N 5°22′12″E

Marseille-La Capelette
- Former canton
- Interactive map of Marseille-La Capelette
- Country: France
- Region: Provence-Alpes-Côte d'Azur
- Department: Bouches-du-Rhône
- No. of communes: {{{nbcomm}}}
- Disbanded: 2015
- Population (2012): 40,351

Canton of Marseille-La Capelette is a former canton located within the commune of Marseille in the Bouches-du-Rhône department of France. It was created 27 February 2003 by the decree 2003-156 of that date. It was disbanded following the French canton reorganisation which came into effect in March 2015. Its population was 40,351 in 2012.

Elected to represent the canton in the General Council of Bouches-du-Rhône:

- Janine Ecochard (PS, 2001—08)

== Area ==
It is composed of the part of the 5th arrondissement of Marseille south of an imaginary line along rue Saint-Pierre, boulevard Jean-Moulin, boulevard Baille (excluded) and rue du Berceau (excluded) until avenue de Toulon. It is also composed of 5th arrondissement situated west of rue François-Mauriac from the 9th arrondissement, avenue Pierre-Doize until it meets avenue Florian and then continues on until avenue Florian meets the 11th arrondissement.

== See also ==
- Arrondissement of Marseille
- Cantons of the Bouches-du-Rhône department
- Communes of the Bouches-du-Rhône department
