= Canton of Marseille – Notre-Dame-du-Mont =

Coordinates: 43°17′47″N 5°22′12″E

Marseille - Notre-Dame-du-Mont
- Former canton
- Interactive map of Marseille - Notre-Dame-du-Mont
- Country: France
- Region: Provence-Alpes-Côte d'Azur
- Department: Bouches-du-Rhône
- No. of communes: {{{nbcomm}}}
- Disbanded: 2015
- Population (2012): 32,980

Canton of Marseille – Notre-Dame-du-Mont is a former canton located within the commune of Marseille in the Bouches-du-Rhône department of France. It was created 27 February 2003 by the decree 2003-156 of that date. It was disbanded following the French canton reorganisation which came into effect in March 2015. Its population was 32,980 in 2012.

Elected to represent the canton in the General Council of Bouches-du-Rhône:

- Joseph Zeitoun (PS, 2001-2008)

== Area ==
It was composed of the part of the 5th municipal arrondissement of Marseille situated west of rue Auguste-Blanqui (included), rue Saint-Pierre (included), boulevard Jean-Moulin (excluded), boulevard Baille, rue du Berceau, avenue de Toulon and a part of the 6th municipal arrondissement not part of the canton of Marseille-Vauban.

== See also ==
- Arrondissement of Marseille
- Cantons of the Bouches-du-Rhône department
- Communes of the Bouches-du-Rhône department
