= 13th arrondissement =

13th arrondissement may refer to:

- 13th arrondissement of Marseille
- 13th arrondissement of Paris
- 13th arrondissement of the Littoral Department, Benin
