= Canton of Marseille-La Blancarde =

Coordinates: 43°17′47″N 5°22′12″E

Marseille-La Blancarde
- Former canton
- Interactive map of Marseille-La Blancarde
- Country: France
- Region: Provence-Alpes-Côte d'Azur
- Department: Bouches-du-Rhône
- No. of communes: {{{nbcomm}}}
- Disbanded: 2015
- Population (2012): 32,665

Canton of Marseille-La Blancarde is a former canton located within the commune of Marseille in the Bouches-du-Rhône department of France. It was created 27 February 2003 by the decree 2003-156 of that date. It was disbanded following the French canton reorganisation which came into effect in March 2015. Its population was 32,665 in 2012.

Elected to represent the canton in the General Council of Bouches-du-Rhône:

- Maurice Di Nocera (UDF, 2001–2008)

== Area ==
It is composed of the part of the 4th arrondissement of Marseille not within the Canton of Marseille-Les Cinq-Avenues and a part of the 12th arrondissement of Marseille west of an imaginary line along these roads:

Avenue de Montolivet (until rue de la Boucle), traverse Riflard, rue Henri-Fabre (excluded), boulevard Debord, boulevard Gillet, boulevard Gavoty, rue Saint-Léon, rue Elzéard-Rougier, rue Scaramelli, allée Gavoty-Honorat, impasse Saint-Hugues, square Hopkinson, rue Beau.

== See also ==
- Arrondissement of Marseille
- Cantons of the Bouches-du-Rhône department
- Communes of the Bouches-du-Rhône department
