= Arrondissements of Marseille =

Territorial subdivision of the municipality of Marseille

The sixteen arrondissements and eight sectors of Marseille

This list of the sixteen arrondissements of Marseille (French: Arrondissements de Marseille), France includes their INSEE code, postal code, sector and neighbourhoods.

Unlike Paris and Lyon, each municipal arrondissement of Marseille is not governed by an elected council (conseil d'arrondissement) and mayor. Instead, the city is divided into eight sectors, each grouping two arrondissements, with an elected council (conseil de secteur) and mayor. The sectors return a number of councillors to the municipal council of Marseille, proportionally to their population, for city matters.

== List ==
INSEE code	Postal code	Arrondissement	Sector	Population (2007)	Area (ha)	Neighbourhoods
13201	13001	1st	1	40,919	177.8	Belsunce, Le Chapitre, Noailles, Opéra, Saint-Charles, Thiers
13207	13007	7th	1	35,981	569.1	Bompard, Endoume, Les Îles, Le Pharo, Le Roucas Blanc, Saint-Lambert, Saint-Victor
13202	13002	2nd	2	25,779	504	Arenc, Les Grands Carmes, Hôtel de Ville, La Joliette
13203	13003	3rd	2	45,414	260	Belle de Mai, Saint-Lazare, Saint-Mauront, La Villette
13204	13004	4th	3	47,193	290	La Blancarde, Les Chartreux, Chutes-Lavie, Cinq Avenues
13205	13005	5th	3	44,583	224	Baille, Le Camas, La Conception, Saint-Pierre
13206	13006	6th	4	43,360	210	Castellane, Lodi, Notre Dame du Mont, Palais de Justice, Préfecture, Vauban
13208	13008	8th	4	78,837	1,855	Bonneveine, Les Goudes, Montredon, Perier, La Plage, La Pointe Rouge, Le Rouet, Sainte-Anne, Saint-Giniez, Vieille Chapelle
13209	13009	9th	5	76,868	6,324	Les Baumettes, Le Cabot, Carpiagne, Mazargues, La Panouse, Le Redon, Sainte-Marguerite, Sormiou, Vaufrèges
13210	13010	10th	5	51,299	1,084	La Capelette, Menpenti, Pont-de-Vivaux, Saint-Loup, Saint-Tronc, La Timone
13211	13011	11th	6	56,792	2,986	Les Accates, La Barasse, Les Camoins, Éoures, La Millière, La Pomme, Saint-Marcel, Saint-Menet, La Treille, La Valbarelle, La Valentine
13212	13012	12th	6	58,734	1,400	Les Caillols, La Fourragère, Montolivet, Saint-Barnabé, Saint-Jean du Désert, Saint-Julien, Les Trois-Lucs
13213	13013	13th	7	89,316	2,808.1	Château Gombert, La Croix-Rouge, Malpassé, Les Médecins, Les Mourets, Les Olives, Palama, La Rose, Saint-Jérôme, Saint-Just, Saint-Mitre
13214	13014	14th	7	61,920	1,639.3	Les Arnavaux, Bon Secours, Le Canet, Le Merlan, Saint-Barthélemy, Sainte-Marthe, Saint-Joseph
13215	13015	15th	8	77,770	1,690	Les Aygalades, Les Borels, La Cabucelle, La Calade, Les Crottes, La Delorme, Notre-Dame Limite, Saint-Antoine, Saint-Louis, Verduron, La Viste
13216	13016	16th	8	17,630	1,630	L'Estaque, Les Riaux, Saint-André, Saint-Henri

== Pre-revolutionary parishes ==
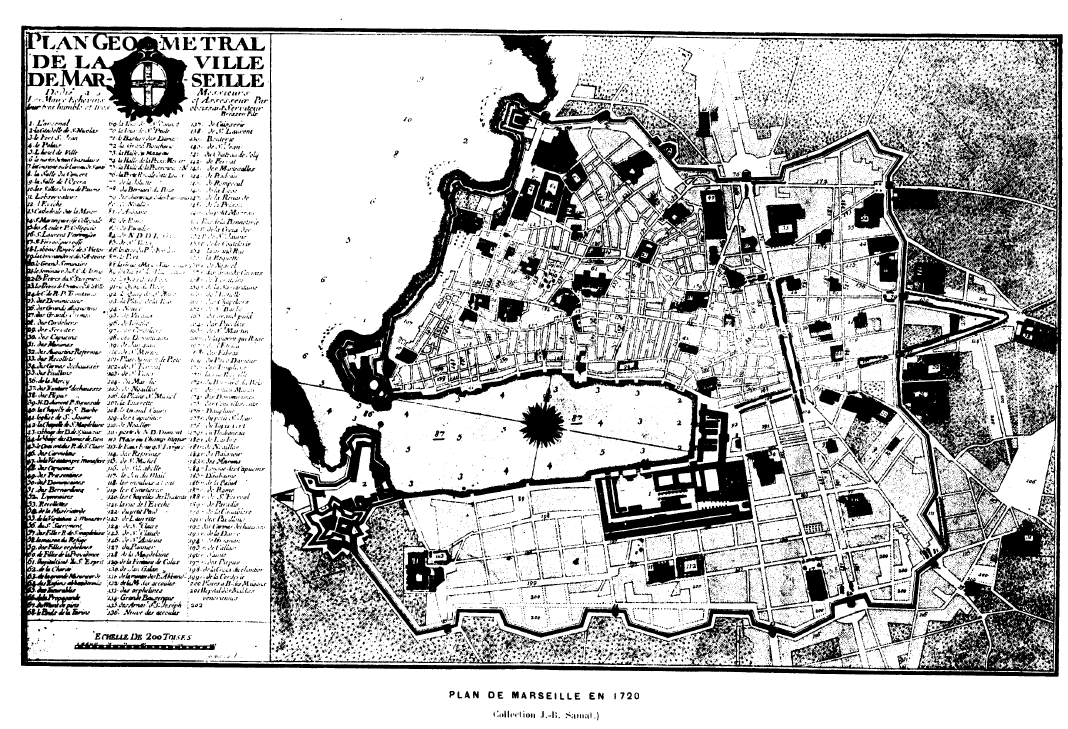
A map of Marseille in 1720

Prior to the French Revolution, the city had five parishes:

- La Major
- Les Accoules
- Saint-Laurent
- Saint-Martin
- Saint-Ferréol

It also included three parishes outside the city:

- Saint-Julien
- Saint-Marcel
- Château Gombert
