= Canton of Marseille-La Belle-de-Mai =

Coordinates: 43°17′47″N 5°22′12″E

Marseille-La Belle-de-Mai
- Former canton
- Interactive map of Marseille-La Belle-de-Mai
- Country: France
- Region: Provence-Alpes-Côte d'Azur
- Department: Bouches-du-Rhône
- No. of communes: {{{nbcomm}}}
- Disbanded: 2015
- Population (2012): 28,667

Canton of Marseille-La Belle-de-Mai is a former canton located within the commune of Marseille in the Bouches-du-Rhône department of France. It was created 27 February 2003 by the decree 2003-156 of that date. It was disbanded following the French canton reorganisation which came into effect in March 2015. Its population was 28,667 in 2012.

Elected to represent the canton in the General Council of Bouches-du-Rhône:

- Lisette Narducci (PS, 2001-2008)

== Area ==
It is composed of the part of the 3rd arrondissement of Marseille south of an imaginary line along boulevard Mirabeau, boulevard National until rue Hoche (which is excluded), rue Jean-Christofol, rue Belle-de-Mai, rue Loubon until rue Barsotti, rue Ricard, rue Bonhomme, rue Joseph-Cabasson, traverse Bon-Secours until the border with the 14th arrondissement.

== See also ==
- Arrondissement of Marseille
- Cantons of the Bouches-du-Rhône department
- Communes of the Bouches-du-Rhône department
