= Canton of Marseille-La Pointe-Rouge =

Coordinates: 43°17′47″N 5°22′12″E

Marseille-La Pointe-Rouge
- Former canton
- Interactive map of Marseille-La Pointe-Rouge
- Country: France
- Region: Provence-Alpes-Côte d'Azur
- Department: Bouches-du-Rhône
- No. of communes: {{{nbcomm}}}
- Disbanded: 2015
- Population (2012): 31,142

Canton of Marseille-La Pointe-Rouge is a former canton located within the commune of Marseille in the Bouches-du-Rhône department of France. It was created 27 February 2003 by the decree 2003-156 of that date. It was disbanded following the French canton reorganisation which came into effect in March 2015. Its population was 31,142 in 2012.

Elected to represent the canton in the General Council of Bouches-du-Rhône:

- Richard Miron (UMP, 2001–2008)

== Area ==
It is composed of the part of the 8th arrondissement of Marseille south of an imaginary line along these streets:

avenue Pierre-Mendès-France starting at boulevard des Neiges, avenue de Bonneveine, avenue de Hambourg, avenue d'Haïfa, traverse Ratonneau, rue Callelongue, boulevard Baptiste-Bonnet, boulevard Barbe, boulevard Pépin, boulevard de Sainte-Anne, avenue de Mazargues, avenue Guy-de-Maupassant.

== See also ==
- Arrondissement of Marseille
- Cantons of the Bouches-du-Rhône department
- Communes of the Bouches-du-Rhône department
