= Arrondissement of Marseille =

Coordinates: 43°17′51″N 5°22′38″E

Marseille
- Arrondissement
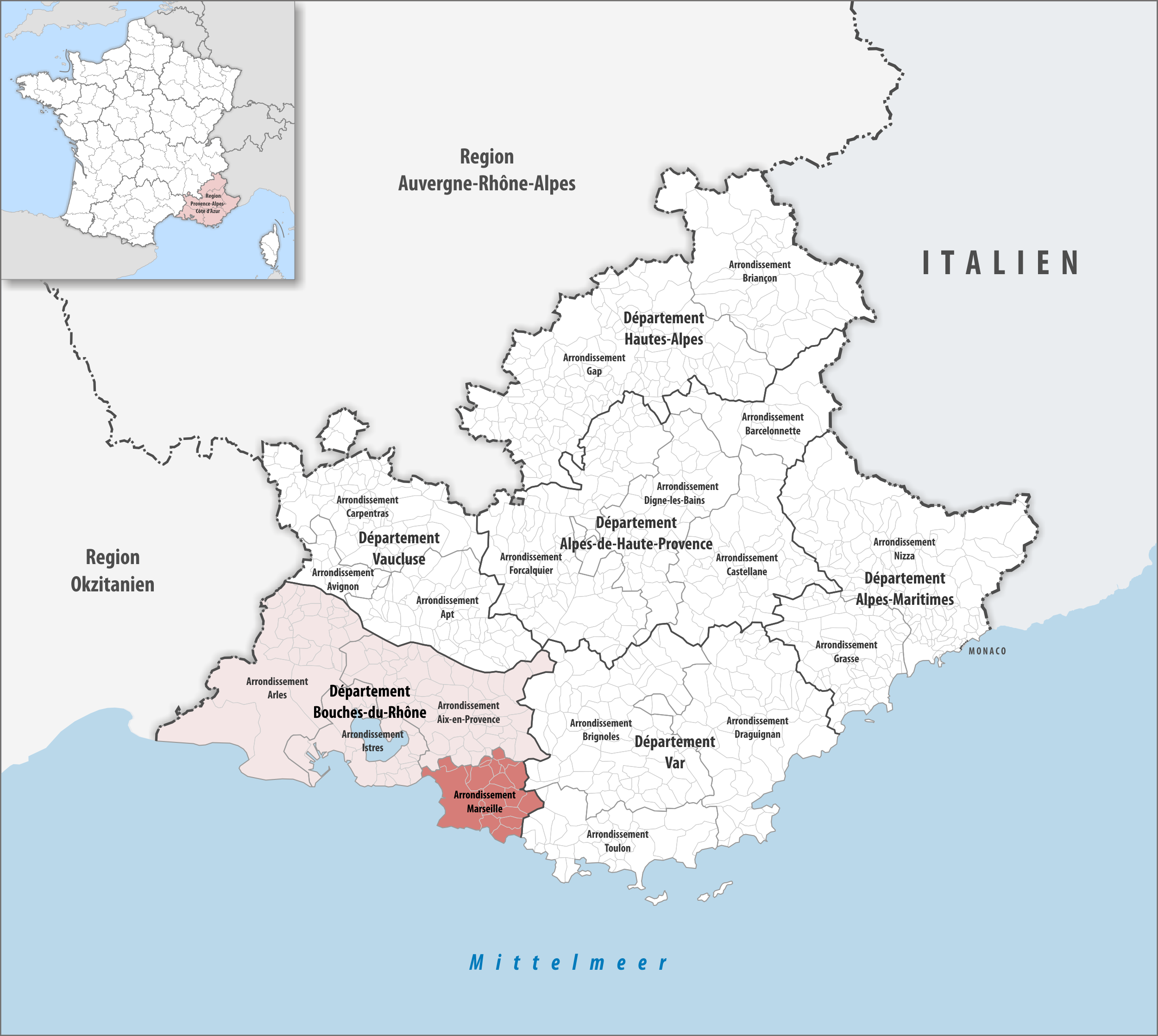
- Location within the region Provence-Alpes-Côte d'Azur
- Country: France
- Region: Provence-Alpes-Côte d'Azur
- Department: Bouches-du-Rhône
- No. of communes: {{{nbcomm}}}
- Area: 683.2 km^{2} (263.8 sq mi)
- Population (2023): 1,106,776
  - Density: 1,620/km^{2} (4,196/sq mi)
- INSEE code: 133

The arrondissement of Marseille is an arrondissement of France in the Bouches-du-Rhône department in the Provence-Alpes-Côte d'Azur region. It has 21 communes. Its population is 1,090,221 (2021), and its area is 683.2 km^{2} (263.8 sq mi).

== Composition ==
The communes of the arrondissement of Marseille, and their INSEE codes, are:

1. Allauch (13002)
2. Aubagne (13005)
3. Auriol (13007)
4. Belcodène (13013)
5. La Bouilladisse (13016)
6. Cadolive (13020)
7. Carnoux-en-Provence (13119)
8. Cassis (13022)
9. Ceyreste (13023)
10. La Ciotat (13028)
11. Cuges-les-Pins (13030)
12. La Destrousse (13031)
13. Gémenos (13042)
14. Marseille (13055)
15. La Penne-sur-Huveaune (13070)
16. Peypin (13073)
17. Plan-de-Cuques (13075)
18. Roquefort-la-Bédoule (13085)
19. Roquevaire (13086)
20. Saint-Savournin (13101)
21. Septèmes-les-Vallons (13106)

== History ==
The arrondissement of Marseille was created in 1800. At the March 2017 reorganisation of the arrondissements of Bouches-du-Rhône, it lost one commune to the arrondissement of Aix-en-Provence, and it gained one commune from the arrondissement of Aix-en-Provence.

As a result of the reorganisation of the cantons of France which came into effect in 2015, the borders of the cantons are no longer related to the borders of the arrondissements. The cantons of the arrondissement of Marseille were, as of January 2015:

1. Allauch
2. Aubagne-Est
3. Aubagne-Ouest
4. La Ciotat
5. Marseille-La Belle-de-Mai
6. Marseille-Belsunce
7. Marseille-La Blancarde
8. Marseille-Le Camas
9. Marseille-La Capelette
10. Marseille-Les Cinq-Avenues
11. Marseille-Les Grands-Carmes
12. Marseille-Mazargues
13. Marseille-Montolivet
14. Marseille - Notre-Dame-du-Mont
15. Marseille - Notre-Dame-Limite
16. Marseille-Les Olives
17. Marseille-La Pointe-Rouge
18. Marseille-La Pomme
19. Marseille-La Rose
20. Marseille - Saint-Barthélemy
21. Marseille - Sainte-Marguerite
22. Marseille - Saint-Giniez
23. Marseille - Saint-Just
24. Marseille - Saint-Lambert
25. Marseille - Saint-Marcel
26. Marseille - Saint-Mauront
27. Marseille-Les Trois Lucs
28. Marseille-Vauban
29. Marseille-Verduron
30. Roquevaire
