= Canton of Marseille – Saint-Just =

Coordinates: 43°17′47″N 5°22′12″E

Marseille - Saint-Just
- Former canton
- Interactive map of Marseille - Saint-Just
- Country: France
- Region: Provence-Alpes-Côte d'Azur
- Department: Bouches-du-Rhône
- No. of communes: {{{nbcomm}}}
- Disbanded: 2015
- Population (2012): 34,401

Canton of Marseille – Saint-Just is a former canton located within the commune of Marseille in the Bouches-du-Rhône department of France. It was created 27 February 2003 by the decree 2003-156 of that date. It was disbanded following the French canton reorganisation which came into effect in March 2015. Its population was 34,401 in 2012.

Elected to represent the canton in the General Council of Bouches-du-Rhône:

- Michel Pezet (PS, 2001-2008)

== Area ==
It is composed of the part of the 13th arrondissement of Marseille west of an imaginary line along avenue du Merlan-à-la-Rose (from the edge of the 14th arrondissement), boulevard Laveran, rue de Marathon, boulevard Bouge, boulevard Gémy, boulevard Barry, impasse Merle and the roads that extend from it until it borders with the 12th arrondissement and a part of the 14th arrondissement south of rue de la Carrière from where it traverses boulevard de Plombières (which is excluded), rue Saint-André, chemin de Gibbes (excluded), rue Saint-Gabriel, boulevard Kraëmer, chemin de Gibbes (excluded), boulevard Bertrandon, chemin Sainte-Marthe, allée Marcel-Soulat, traverse Fonvert, boulevard Louis-Villecroze and traverse des Marronniers until it borders on the 13th arrondissement.

== See also ==
- Arrondissement of Marseille
- Cantons of the Bouches-du-Rhône department
- Communes of the Bouches-du-Rhône department
