= Canton of Aubagne-Est =

Coordinates: 43°17′27″N 5°34′15″E

Aubagne-Est
- Former canton
- Interactive map of Aubagne-Est
- Country: France
- Region: Provence-Alpes-Côte d'Azur
- Department: Bouches-du-Rhône
- No. of communes: {{{nbcomm}}}
- Disbanded: 2015
- Population (2012): 40,778

The Canton of Aubagne-Est is a former canton located within the administrative department of Bouches-du-Rhône in southern France. It was created 27 February 2003 by the decree 2003-156 of that date. It had 40,778 inhabitants (2012). It was disbanded following the French canton reorganisation which came into effect in March 2015.

Elected to represent the canton in the General Council of Bouches-du-Rhône:

- Roland Giberti (Nouveau Centre, 2004-2014)

== Area ==
It was composed of the eastern half of Aubagne defined by a line through chemin de Font-de-Mai, route d'Eoure, A501 autoroute, avenue Roger-Salengro, avenue de Garlaban, the railway line and the chemin de Fenestrelle. It also contained the communes of Carnoux-en-Provence, Cassis, Cuges-les-Pins, Gémenos et Roquefort-la-Bédoule.

== See also ==
- Arrondissement of Marseille
- Cantons of the Bouches-du-Rhône department
- Communes of the Bouches-du-Rhône department
