= Canton of Marseille-Les Grands-Carmes =

Coordinates: 43°17′47″N 5°22′12″E

Marseille-Les Grands-Carmes
- Former canton
- Interactive map of Marseille-Les Grands-Carmes
- Country: France
- Region: Provence-Alpes-Côte d'Azur
- Department: Bouches-du-Rhône
- No. of communes: {{{nbcomm}}}
- Disbanded: 2015
- Population (2012): 29,292

Canton of Marseille-Les Grands-Carmes is a former canton located within the commune of Marseille in the Bouches-du-Rhône department of France. It was created 27 February 2003 by the decree 2003-156 of that date. It was disbanded following the French canton reorganisation which came into effect in March 2015. Its population was 29,292 in 2012.

Elected to represent the canton in the General Council of Bouches-du-Rhône:

- Jean-Noël Guérini (PS, 2001-2008)

== Area ==
It is composed of the part of the 1st arrondissement of Marseille situated north of the streets rue Colbert and rue Nationale until the border with the Canton of Marseille-Les Cinq-Avenues and the 2nd arrondissement of Marseille.

== See also ==
- Arrondissement of Marseille
- Cantons of the Bouches-du-Rhône department
- Communes of the Bouches-du-Rhône department
