= Canton of Marseille-Mazargues =

Coordinates: 43°17′47″N 5°22′12″E

Marseille-Mazargues
- Former canton
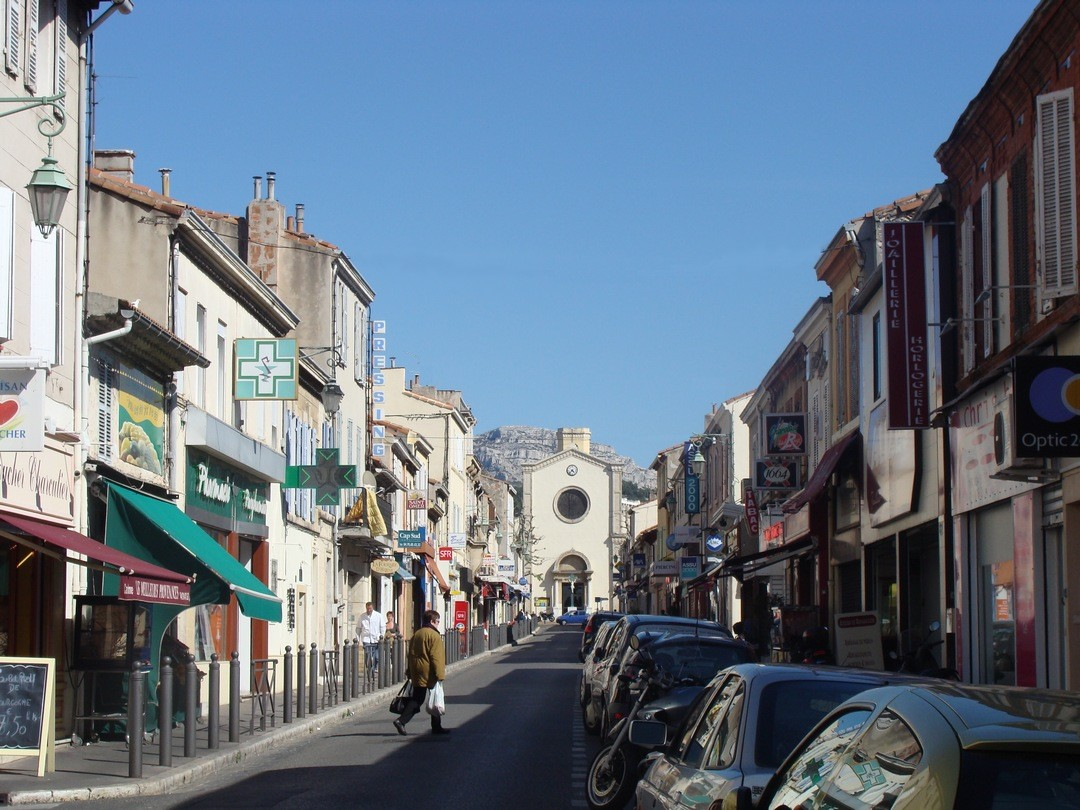
- Interactive map of Marseille-Mazargues
- Country: France
- Region: Provence-Alpes-Côte d'Azur
- Department: Bouches-du-Rhône
- No. of communes: {{{nbcomm}}}
- Disbanded: 2015
- Population (2012): 38,005

The Canton of Marseille-Mazargues is a former canton within the commune of Marseille in the Bouches-du-Rhône department of France. It was created on 27 February 2003 by the decree 2003-156 of that date. It was disbanded following the French canton reorganisation which came into effect in March 2015. Its population was 38,005 in 2012.

Elected to represent the canton in the General Council of Bouches-du-Rhône:

- Didier Réault (UMP, 2001–08)

== Area ==
It is composed of the part of the 9th municipal arrondissement of Marseille south of an imaginary line along the following streets: rue de l'Aviateur-Lebrix, rue Carnavalet (excluded), rue Marie-de-Coulanges (excluded), rue Mignard, rue Rabutin-Chantal, rue Mignard, rue de l'Aviateur-Lebrix (excluded), avenue Viton (axis), traverse de la Gaye, chemin Joseph-Aiguier until the intersection with Colline-Saint-Joseph, chemin de la Colline-Saint-Joseph (excluded), boulevard du Redon, route Léon-Lachamp.

== See also ==
- Arrondissement of Marseille
- Cantons of the Bouches-du-Rhône department
- Communes of the Bouches-du-Rhône department
