= Canton of Marseille-Vauban =

Former canton of France

Coordinates: 43°17′47″N 5°22′12″E

Marseille-Vauban
- Former canton
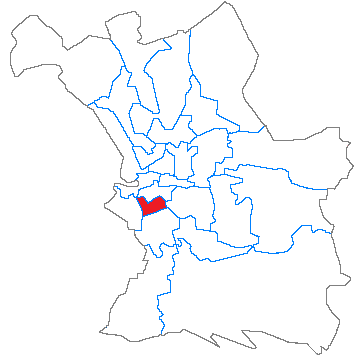
- Country: France
- Region: Provence-Alpes-Côte d'Azur
- Department: Bouches-du-Rhône
- No. of communes: {{{nbcomm}}}
- Disbanded: 2015
- Population (2012): 31,148

Canton of Marseille-Vauban is a former canton located within the commune of Marseille in the Bouches-du-Rhône department of France. It was created 27 February 2003 by the decree 2003-156 of that date. It was disbanded following the French canton reorganisation which came into effect in March 2015. Its population was 31,148 in 2012.

Elected to represent the canton in the General Council of Bouches-du-Rhône:

- André Malrait (UMP, 2001–2008)

== Area ==
It is composed of the part of the 6th municipal arrondissement of Marseille situated south of an imaginary line along boulevard Baille (from the border with the 5th municipal arrondissement), rue de Lodi, rue Pierre-Laurent, rue Perrin-Solliers, boulevard Baille, place Castellane, rue Louis-Maurel, rue Edmond-Rostand, rue Docteur-Jean-Fiolle, rue Stanislas-Torrents, rue Bossuet, rue Breteuil, rue Saint-Jacques, boulevard Notre-Dame until place de la Corderie. It is also composed of a part of the 8th municipal arrondissement situated north of an imaginary line between the end of the impasses du Roc-Fleuri, Tertian and des Colonies, rue de la Turbine (excluded), rue du Lycée-Périer, traverse Périer, boulevard Périer, rue Paradis, rue de Cluny, rue du Chalet, rue Florac, rue Daumier, avenue du Prado and rue Borde.

== See also ==
- Arrondissement of Marseille
- Cantons of the Bouches-du-Rhône department
- Communes of the Bouches-du-Rhône department
