= Plan-de-Cuques =

Commune in Provence-Alpes-Côte d'Azur, France

- Commune
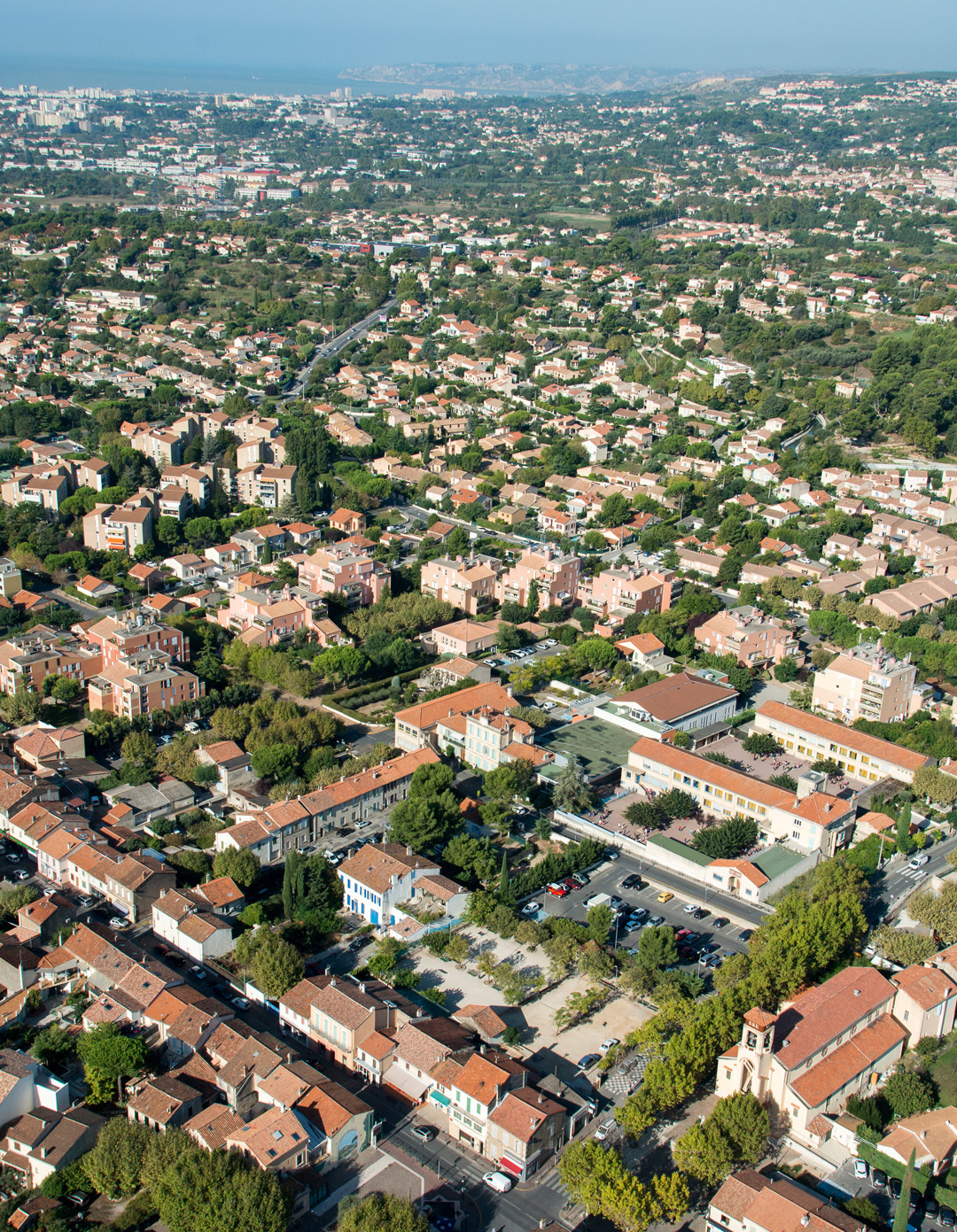
- Aerial view of Plan-de-Cuques

- Coat of arms
- Location of Plan-de-Cuques
- Location within France Location within Provence-Alpes-Côte d'Azur
- Coordinates: 43°20′52″N 5°27′50″E
- Country: France
- Region: Provence-Alpes-Côte d'Azur
- Department: Bouches-du-Rhône
- Arrondissement: Marseille
- Canton: Allauch
- Intercommunality: Aix-Marseille-Provence

Government
  - Mayor (2026–32): Laurent Simon
- Area^{1}: 8.52 km^{2} (3.29 sq mi)
- Elevation: 133 m (436 ft)
- Highest elevation: 550 m (1,800 ft)
- Lowest elevation: 114 m (374 ft)
- Population (2023): 11,632
  - Density: 1,370/km^{2} (3,540/sq mi)
- Time zone: UTC+01:00 (CET)
  - Summer (DST): UTC+02:00 (CEST)
- INSEE/Postal code: 13075 /13380
- Dialling codes: 0491
- ^{1} French Land Register data, which excludes lakes, ponds, glaciers > 1 km^{2} (0.386 sq mi or 247 acres) and river estuaries.

Plan-de-Cuques (French pronunciation: [plɑ̃ də kyk]; Occitan: Lo Plan de Cucas) is a commune northeast of Marseille in the department of Bouches-du-Rhône in the Provence-Alpes-Côte d'Azur region of France. It is located 9.2 km (5.7 mi) from Marseille.

== Population ==
The inhabitants are called Plan-de-Cuquois in French.

Historical population
Year	Pop.	±% p.a.
1968	5,183	—
1975	5,892	+1.85%
1982	8,119	+4.69%
1990	9,847	+2.44%
1999	10,503	+0.72%
2007	10,681	+0.21%
2012	10,896	+0.40%
2017	10,934	+0.07%
2023	11,632	+1.04%
Source: INSEE

== See also ==
- Communes of the Bouches-du-Rhône department
