= École Tour-Sainte =

Coordinates: 43.3441°N 5.3886°E

Information
- Religious affiliation(s): Catholicism
- Enrollment: c. 760 (c. 2018)
- Website: www.toursainte.fr

École Tour-Sainte is a Catholic preschool, primary, junior high, and sixth-form college/senior high school in the 14th arrondissement of Marseille of Marseille, France.

As of 2015 there were about 750 students; circa 2018 there were about 760 students total; 210 students in preschool and primary school, 400 in junior high school, and 150 in sixth-form/senior high school. In 2015 about 75% of the students were Muslim. 42% were classified as low income and were on a bursary.
