= Canton of Marseille – Saint-Lambert =

Coordinates: 43°17′47″N 5°22′12″E

Marseille - Saint-Lambert
- Former canton
- Interactive map of Marseille - Saint-Lambert
- Country: France
- Region: Provence-Alpes-Côte d'Azur
- Department: Bouches-du-Rhône
- No. of communes: {{{nbcomm}}}
- Disbanded: 2015
- Population (2012): 25,572

Canton of Marseille – Saint-Lambert is a former canton located within the commune of Marseille in the Bouches-du-Rhône department of France. It was created 27 February 2003 by the decree 2003-156 of that date. It was disbanded following the French canton reorganisation which came into effect in March 2015. Its population was 25,572 in 2012.

Elected to represent the canton in the General Council of Bouches-du-Rhône:

- Robert Assante (UMP, 2001–2008)

== Area ==
It is composed of the part of the 7th arrondissement of Marseille situated north of an imaginary line composed of the following streets:

rue des Catalans, boulevard Charles-Livon (excluded), avenue Pasteur (excluded), rue Girardin, avenue de la Corse, place du 4-Septembre, rue Chateaubriand, rue du Coteau, rue Crimas (excluded), chemin d'Endoume-le-Vieux, rue Joël-Recher (excluded), rue Sauveur-Tobelem (excluded), rue des Lices, rue Vauvenargues (excluded).

== See also ==
- Arrondissement of Marseille
- Cantons of the Bouches-du-Rhône department
- Communes of the Bouches-du-Rhône department
