= Cantons of Aix-en-Provence =

Cantons in Provence-Alpes-Côte d'Azur, France

Coordinates: 43.53°N 5.45°E

The cantons of Aix-en-Provence are administrative divisions of the Bouches-du-Rhône department, in southeastern France. Since the French canton reorganisation which came into effect in March 2015, the city of Aix-en-Provence is subdivided into 2 cantons. Their seat is in Aix-en-Provence.

== Cantons ==
Name	Population (2019)	Cantonal Code
Canton of Aix-en-Provence-1	73,278	1301
Canton of Aix-en-Provence-2	71,855	1302
