= 4th arrondissement of Marseille =

- Municipal arrondissement
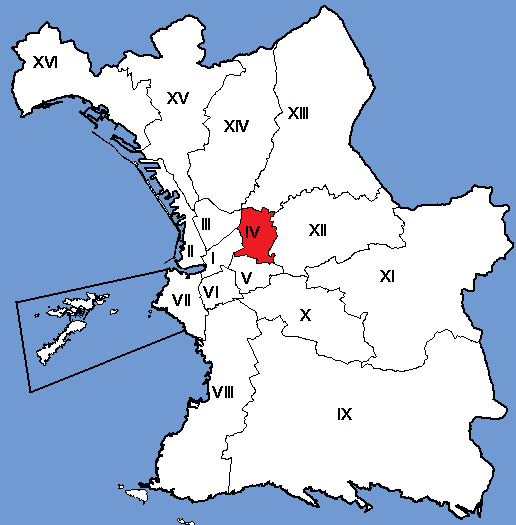
- Location within Marseille
- Interactive map of 4th arrondissement of Marseille
- Coordinates: 43.3058°N 5.4018°E
- Country: France
- Region: Provence-Alpes-Côte d'Azur
- Department: Bouches-du-Rhône
- Commune: Marseille

Government
  - Mayor (2020–2026): Didier Jau (EELV)
- Area: 2.90 km^{2} (1.12 sq mi)
- Population (2023): 49,363
  - Density: 17,000/km^{2} (44,100/sq mi)
- INSEE code: 13204

The 4th arrondissement of Marseille is one of the 16 arrondissements of Marseille. It is governed locally together with the 5th arrondissement, with which it forms the 3rd sector of Marseille.

== Population ==
Historical population
Year	Pop.	±% p.a.
1968	62,140	—
1975	57,434	−1.12%
1982	50,451	−1.83%
1990	44,980	−1.42%
1999	43,805	−0.29%
2007	47,193	+0.94%
2012	47,869	+0.28%
2017	48,459	+0.25%
2023	49,363	+0.31%
Source: INSEE

Neighbourhood	Population (2022)
La Blancarde	15,582
Les Chartreux	11,311
Chutes-Lavie	9,407
Cinq Avenues	13,441
