= Canton of Marseille-Verduron =

Coordinates: 43°17′47″N 5°22′12″E

Marseille-Verduron
- Former canton
- Interactive map of Marseille-Verduron
- Country: France
- Region: Provence-Alpes-Côte d'Azur
- Department: Bouches-du-Rhône
- No. of communes: {{{nbcomm}}}
- Disbanded: 2015
- Population (2012): 37,750

Canton of Marseille-Verduron is a former canton located within the commune of Marseille in the Bouches-du-Rhône department of France. It was created 27 February 2003 by the decree 2003-156 of that date. It was disbanded following the French canton reorganisation which came into effect in March 2015. Its population was 37,750 in 2012.

Elected to represent the canton in the General Council of Bouches-du-Rhône:

- Henri Jibrayel (PS, 2001-2008)

== Area ==
It is composed of the part of the 15th arrondissement of Marseille situated north of a line composed of the following streets: chemin du Littoral, traverse Santi, rue Séverine (excluded), chemin de la Madrague-Ville and chemin de Saint-Louis-au-Rove until it meets traverse de l'Aqueduc. It then follows along avenue de la Viste until rue de la Tramontane then along rue de la Tramontan and rue de la Largarde. The line then cuts across to the intersection with avenue Saint-Antoine then along rue René-d'Anjou, chemin de La Mûre, rue René-d'Anjou, chemin de Saint-Antoine à Saint-Joseph, the railtrack of the Marseille to Briançon line until boulevard Henri-Barnier. It then follows this road until route de la Gavotte which it follows until the commune of Les Pennes-Mirabeau and the 16th arrondissement of Marseille.

== See also ==
- Arrondissement of Marseille
- Cantons of the Bouches-du-Rhône department
- Communes of the Bouches-du-Rhône department
