= Cadolive =

Commune in Provence-Alpes-Côte d'Azur, France

- Commune
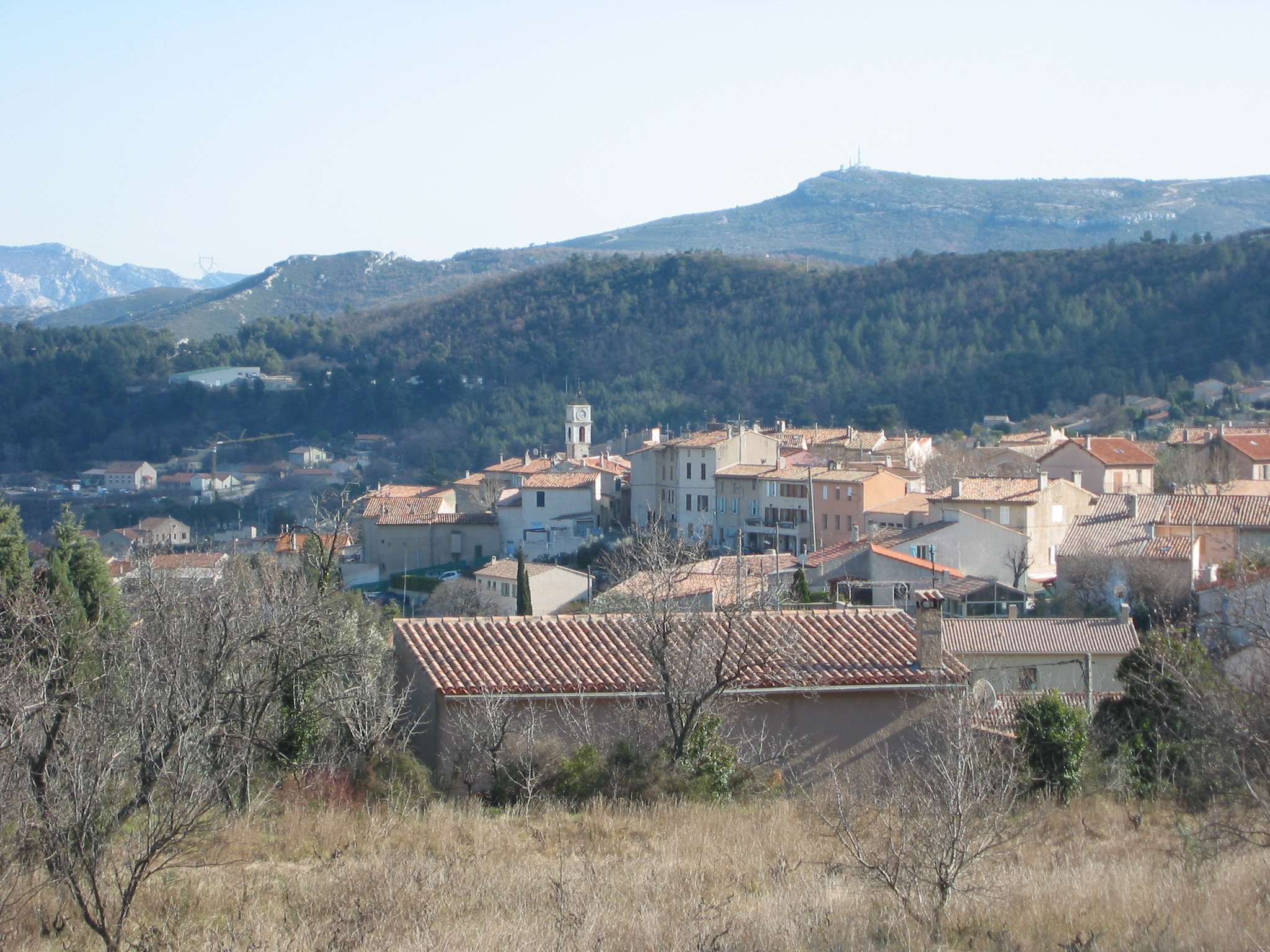
- Cadolive from the west

- Coat of arms
- Location of Cadolive
- Location within France Location within Provence-Alpes-Côte d'Azur
- Coordinates: 43°23′46″N 5°32′41″E
- Country: France
- Region: Provence-Alpes-Côte d'Azur
- Department: Bouches-du-Rhône
- Arrondissement: Marseille
- Canton: Allauch
- Intercommunality: Aix-Marseille-Provence

Government
  - Mayor (2026–32): Serge Perottino
- Area^{1}: 4.18 km^{2} (1.61 sq mi)
- Elevation: 384 m (1,260 ft)
- Highest elevation: 645 m (2,116 ft)
- Lowest elevation: 328 m (1,076 ft)
- Population (2023): 2,236
  - Density: 535/km^{2} (1,390/sq mi)
- Time zone: UTC+01:00 (CET)
  - Summer (DST): UTC+02:00 (CEST)
- INSEE/Postal code: 13020 /13950
- Dialling codes: 0491
- ^{1} French Land Register data, which excludes lakes, ponds, glaciers > 1 km^{2} (0.386 sq mi or 247 acres) and river estuaries.

Cadolive (French pronunciation: [kadɔliv]; Occitan: Ca d'Oliva) is a commune situated east of Marseille at the eastern extremity of the Massif de l'Étoile between Peypin and Saint-Savournin in the department of Bouches-du-Rhône in the Provence-Alpes-Côte d'Azur region in southern France. Until 1900, it was part of the commune of Saint-Savournin.

== Population ==
Historical population

Year	Pop.	±% p.a.
1901	919	—
1906	1,005	+1.81%
1911	1,005	+0.00%
1921	1,122	+1.11%
1926	1,126	+0.07%
1931	1,230	+1.78%
1936	1,133	−1.63%
1946	1,074	−0.53%
1954	1,158	+0.95%
1962	1,138	−0.22%

Year	Pop.	±% p.a.
1968	1,125	−0.19%
1975	1,112	−0.17%
1982	1,239	+1.56%
1990	1,626	+3.46%
1999	2,087	+2.81%
2007	2,130	+0.26%
2012	2,123	−0.07%
2017	2,161	+0.36%
2023	2,236	+0.57%

Source: EHESS and INSEE (1968-2023)

== See also ==
- Communes of the Bouches-du-Rhône department
