= Canton of Marseille-Les Cinq-Avenues =

Coordinates: 43°17′47″N 5°22′12″E

Marseille-Les Cinq-Avenues
- Former canton
- Interactive map of Marseille-Les Cinq-Avenues
- Country: France
- Region: Provence-Alpes-Côte d'Azur
- Department: Bouches-du-Rhône
- No. of communes: {{{nbcomm}}}
- Disbanded: 2015
- Population (2012): 31,881

Canton of Marseille-Les Cinq-Avenues is a former canton located within the commune of Marseille in the Bouches-du-Rhône department of France. It was created 27 February 2003 by the decree 2003-156 of that date. It was disbanded following the French canton reorganisation which came into effect in March 2015. Its population was 31,881 in 2012.

Elected to represent the canton in the General Council of Bouches-du-Rhône:

- Marie-Arlette Carlotti (PS, 2001-2008)

== Area ==
It is composed of the part of the 1st arrondissement of Marseille situated east of an imaginary line defined by following boulevard Maurice-Bourdet (from the 3rd arrondissement of Marseille), place des Marseillaises, boulevard d'Athènes, allée Léon-Gambetta, boulevard de la Libération-Général-de-Monsabert (until the 4th arrondissement of Marseille). It also includes a part of the 4th arrondissement situated west of the boulevard Sakakini, boulevard Françoise-Duparc, boulevard de La Blancarde, rue des Trois-Frères-Carasso, rue de la Conception, boulevard Françoise-Duparc, boulevard Altéras, boulevard d'Arras, rue des Trois-Frères-Carasso, place Pierre-Brossolette, avenue des Chartreux, boulevard du Jardin-Zoologique, rue Louis-Gibert, boulevard Cassini, impasse Ricard-Digne, traverse de l'Observatoire, boulevard Camille-Flammarion, avenue des Chutes-Lavie, boulevard Pardigon, boulevard Barbier, rue Pautrier until the border with the 3rd arrondissement

== See also ==
- Arrondissement of Marseille
- Cantons of the Bouches-du-Rhône department
- Communes of the Bouches-du-Rhône department
