= Canton of Allauch =

Coordinates: 43°20′13″N 5°28′58″E

Allauch
- Canton
- Country: France
- Region: Provence-Alpes-Côte d'Azur
- Department: Bouches-du-Rhône
- No. of communes: {{{nbcomm}}}

Government
  - Representatives (2021–2028): Lionel de Cala; Véronique Miquelly
- Area: 161.54 km^{2} (62.37 sq mi)
- Population (2023): 74,759
  - Density: 462.79/km^{2} (1,198.6/sq mi)
- INSEE code: 13 03

The canton of Allauch is an administrative division of the Bouches-du-Rhône department. Its seat is in Allauch. It was created in 1973. Its borders were modified at the French canton reorganisation which came into effect in March 2015.

== Composition ==
At its creation in 1973, the canton was composed of the communes of Allauch and Plan-de-Cuques. Since the French canton reorganisation which came into effect in March 2015, the communes of the canton of Allauch are:

1. Allauch
2. Auriol
3. Belcodène
4. La Bouilladisse
5. Cadolive
6. La Destrousse
7. Gréasque
8. Peypin
9. Plan-de-Cuques
10. Saint-Savournin

== Councillors ==
| Election | Councillors | Party | Occupation |
|---|---|---|---|
| 2015 | Bruno Genzana | UDI | Regional Councilor of Provence-Alpes-Côte d'Azur |
| 2015 | Véronique Miquelly | LR | Councillor of Auriol |
| 2021 | Lionel de Cala | LR | Mayor of Allauch |
| 2021 | Véronique Miquelly | LR | Mayor of Auriol |

== Pictures of the canton ==
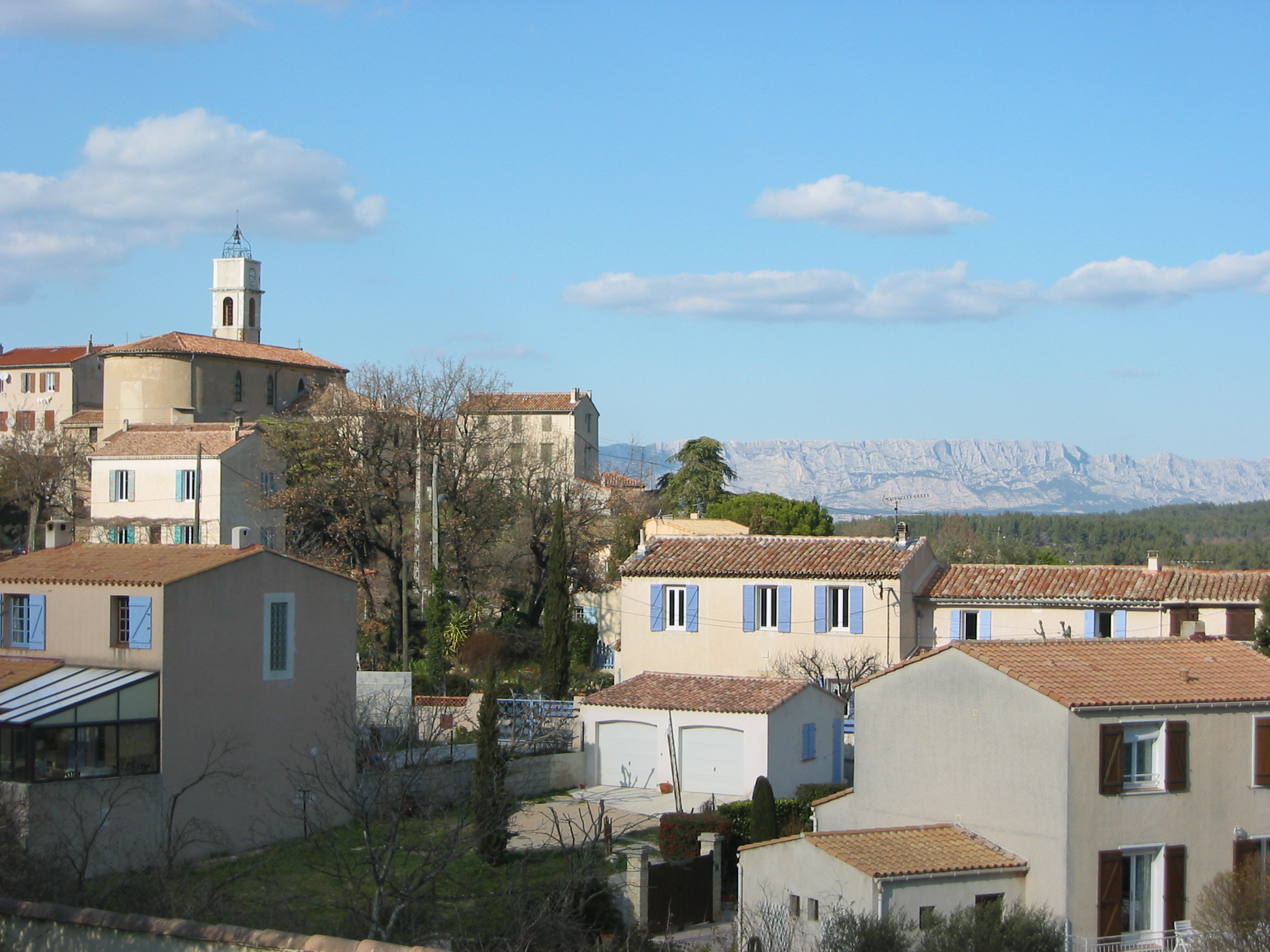
View of Cadolive

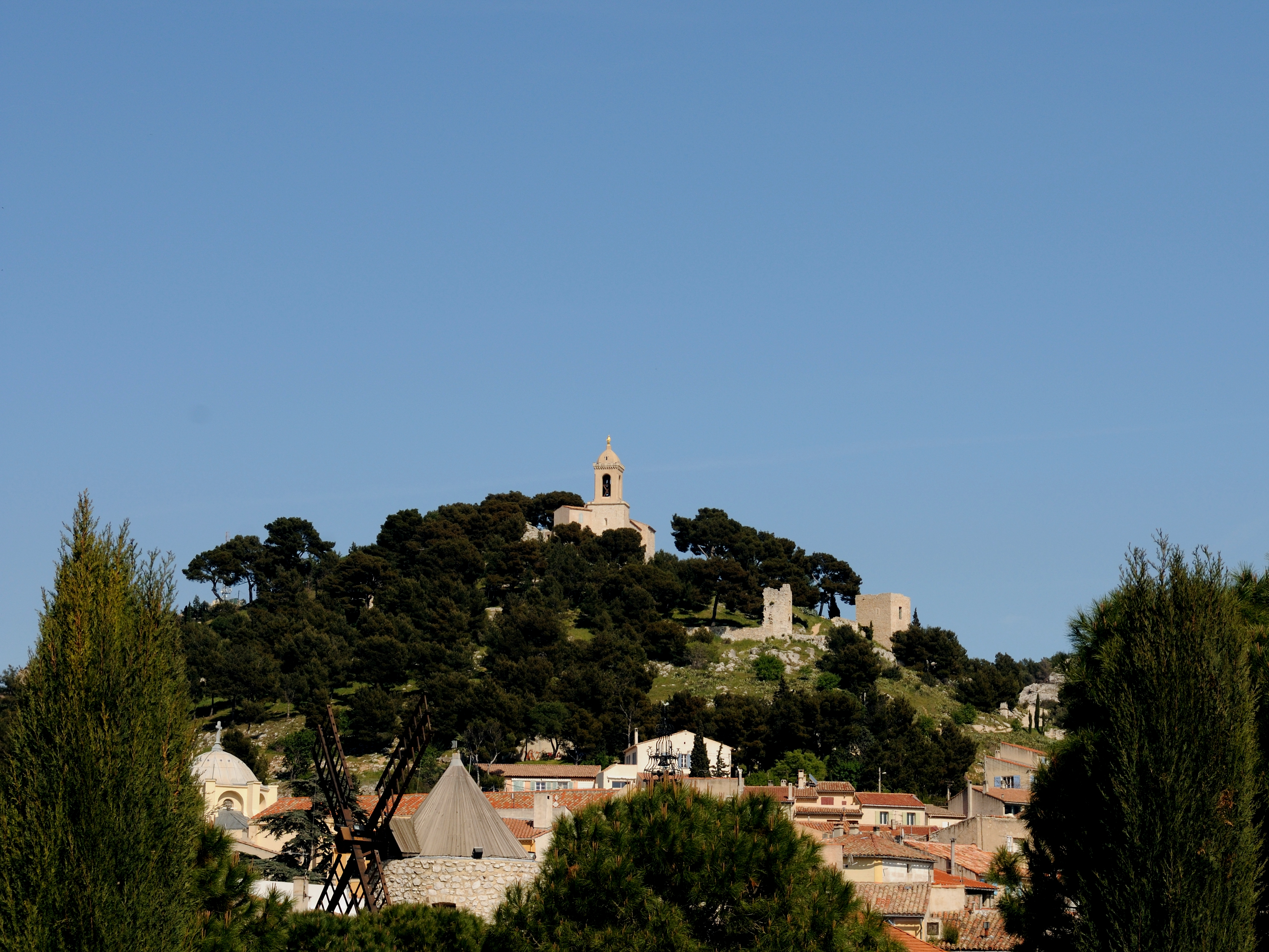
Remains of the Allauch's Castle

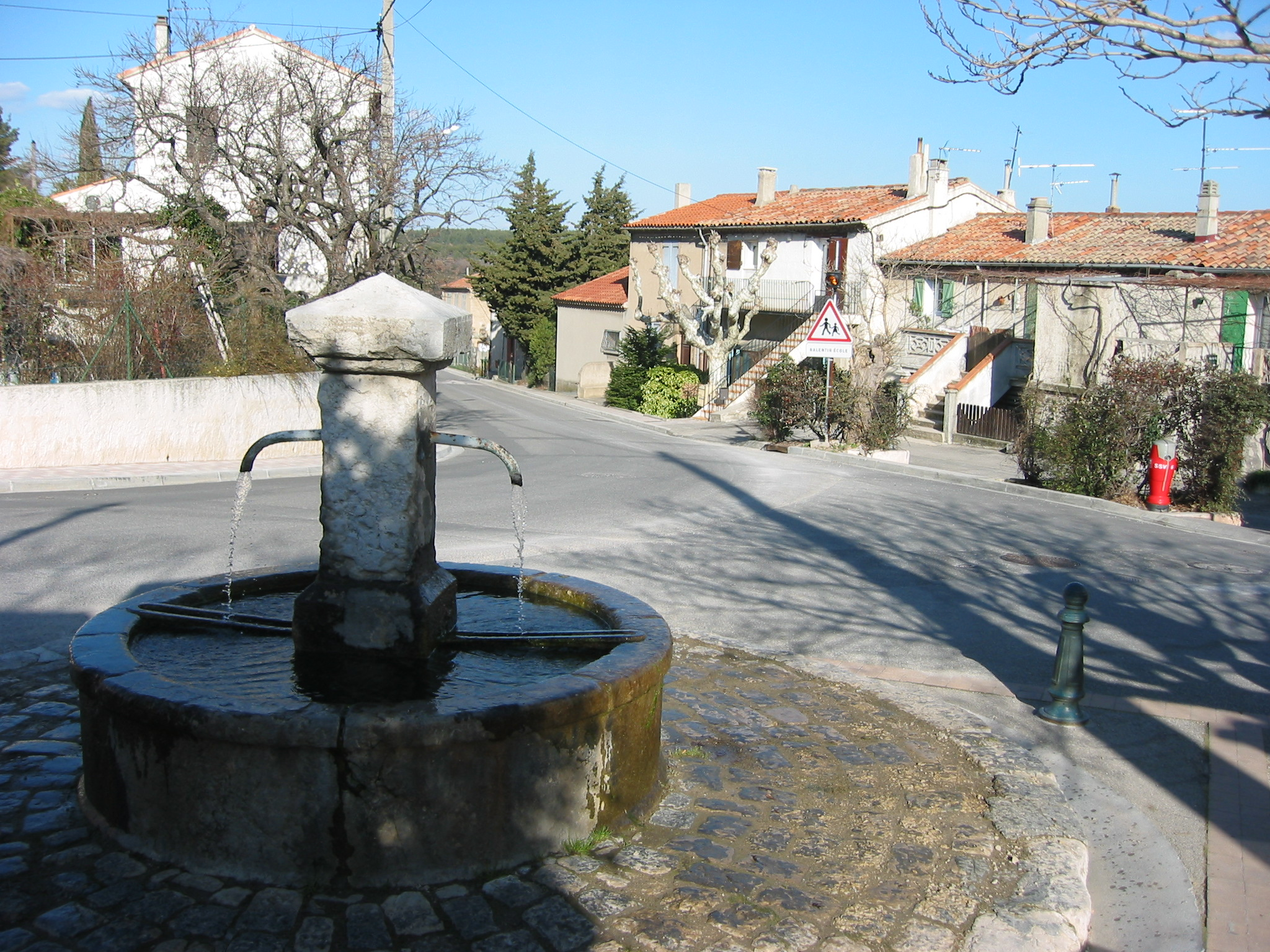
La Valentine's hamlet in Saint-Savournin

== See also ==
- Cantons of the Bouches-du-Rhône department
- Communes of the Bouches-du-Rhône department
