= 9th arrondissement of Marseille =

- Municipal arrondissement
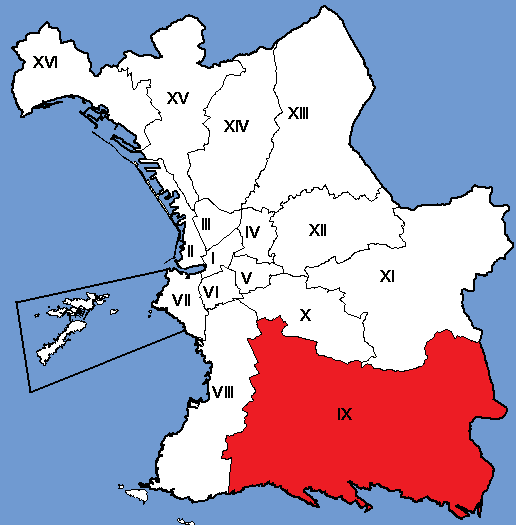
- Location within Marseille
- Interactive map of 9th arrondissement of Marseille
- Coordinates: 43.2290°N 5.4463°E
- Country: France
- Region: Provence-Alpes-Côte d'Azur
- Department: Bouches-du-Rhône
- Commune: Marseille

Government
  - Mayor (2026–2032): Eléonore Bez (Rassemblement national)
- Area: 63.24 km^{2} (24.42 sq mi)
- Population (2023): 77,406
  - Density: 1,224/km^{2} (3,170/sq mi)
- INSEE code: 13209

The 9th arrondissement of Marseille is one of 16 arrondissements of Marseille. This district is the largest in the city. The 9th arrondissement borders the 8th, 10th and 11th arrondissements. It is governed locally together with the 10th arrondissement, with which it forms the 5th sector of Marseille.

== Neighbourhoods ==
The district is divided into nine neighbourhoods: Les Baumettes, Le Cabot, Carpiagne, La Panouse, Le Redon (comprising Luminy), Mazargues, Sainte-Marguerite, Sormiou, Vaufrèges, along with multiple smaller sized lots. The arrondissement also contains part of the Massif des Calanques.

== Public transport ==
The 9th district has two subway stations, part of the Marseille Metro.

- Rond-Point du Prado
- Sainte-Marguerite Dromel

== Principal landmarks ==
- The Mazargues obelisk
- The Mazargues War Cemetery, a Commonwealth War Graves Commission burial ground, is located on Avenue General de Lattre de Tassigny. Covering an area of 9,021 square metres (97,100 sq ft), it contains memorials to 1742 war casualties, including 1487 from World War I and 267 from World War II.

== Demography ==
Historical population
Year	Pop.	±% p.a.
1968	66,893	—
1975	73,802	+1.41%
1982	73,404	−0.08%
1990	70,832	−0.44%
1999	72,758	+0.30%
2007	76,868	+0.69%
2012	74,130	−0.72%
2017	75,914	+0.48%
2023	77,406	+0.32%
Source: INSEE

Neighbourhood	Population (2022)
Les Baumettes	6,691
Le Cabot	11,274
Carpiagne	525
Mazargues	17,810
La Panouse	5,725
Le Redon	5,547
Sainte-Marguerite	20,583
Sormiou	7,576
Vaufrèges	610

=== Education and training by neighbourhood in 2006 ===
Non-graduation and graduates rates by area as of January 1, 2006
Neighbourhood	15+ years of school	total without diploma	% without diploma	total with 3+ BAC	% with 3+ BAC
Les Baumettes	5 329	1 390	26.09%	493	9.25%
Le Cabot	8 060	815	10.11%	2 010	24.94%
Carpiagne	582	464	79.73%	1	0.17%
Mazargues	13 082	2 340	17.88%	2 143	16.38%
La Panouse	4 148	494	11.90%	888	21.42%
Le Redon	2 874	416	14.49%	452	15.73%
Sainte-Marguerite	15 283	3 236	21.17%	1 766	11.55%
Sormiou	4 531	1 196	26.40%	852	18.81%
Vaufrèges	463	85	18.45%	47	10.22%
Arrondissement	54 350	10 436	19.20%	8 653	15.92%
Total Marseille	590 908	149 305	25.27%	79 435	13.44%

=== Unemployment rate by neighbourhood in 2006 ===
Neighbourhood	Workforce	Number of unemployed	Unemployment rate
Les Baumettes	2 308	299	12,95%
Le Cabot	4 596	420	9,14%
Carpiagne	91	0	0,00%
Mazargues	7 777	1 030	13,24%
La Panouse	2 402	309	12,85%
Le Redon	1 881	199	10,59%
Sainte-Marguerite	8 874	1 159	13,06%
Sormiou	2 809	465	16,55%
Vaufrèges	266	28	10,68%
Arrondissement	31 005	3 909	12,61%
Total Marseille	352 855	64 330	18,23%

=== Beneficiaries of supplementary universal health coverage (CMU-C) by neighbourhood ===
Supplementary CMU (CMU-C) is a free complementary health plan that covers what is not covered by compulsory health insurance schemes.

Beneficiaries of the CMU-C by IRIS in 2008

Neighbourhood	Population covered in 2008	Beneficiaries CMU-C 2008	Percentage of Beneficiaries 2008
Les Baumettes	5 372	576	10,72%
Le Cabot	6 770	243	3,59%
Carpiagne	2	0	0,00%
Mazargues	14 789	1 137	7,69%
La Panouse	4 394	146	3,32%
Le Redon	3 049	120	3,94%
Sainte-Marguerite	16 885	1 755	10,59%
Sormiou	5 297	950	17,93%
Vaufrèges	466	9	1,93%
Arrondissement	57 701	4 969	8,61%
Total Marseille	718 664	132 156	18,39%

=== Families by neighbourhood in 2006 ===
Single parent families and families with four children at 1 January 2006

Neighbourhood	Families	of whom, single parent families	% single parent families	families with four or more children	% families with four or more children
Les Baumettes	1 389	239	17.25%	23	1.65%
Le Cabot	2 977	386	12.96%	40	1.35%
Carpiagne	60	4	6.67%	4	6.67%
Mazargues	4 773	923	19.33%	92	1.94%
La Panouse	1 496	264	17.66%	25	1.67%
Le Redon	1 164	230	19.78%	6	0.49%
Sainte-Marguerite	5 652	1 179	20.86%	108	1.92%
Sormiou	1 835	341	18.59%	124	6.74%
Vaufrèges	186	22	11.72%	1	0.65%
Total arrondissement	19 529	3 588	18.37%	423	2.17%
Total Marseille	213 538	46 568	21.81%	8 414	3.94%

=== Dwellings by neighbourhood at 8/3/1999 ===
Neighbourhood	% tenants	% apartment buildings	% 4 or more rooms
Les Baumettes	35,45%	54,33%	61,38%
Le Cabot	32,09%	89,99%	48,60%
Carpiagne	100,00%	95,00%	75,00%
Mazargues	51,94%	81,06%	42,98%
La Panouse	30,13%	88,93%	54,61%
Le Redon	51,38%	74,72%	49,25%
Sainte-Marguerite	41,04%	86,31%	45,20%
Sormiou	48,05%	71,43%	60,74%
Vaufrèges	21,28%	13,19%	54,89%
Arrondissement	41,69%	81,53%	48,33%
Total Marseille	51,73%	82,86%	38,21%

=== Population of neighbourhood by age at 8/3/1999 ===
Neighbourhood	% 0–19 years	% 20–39 years	% 40–59 years	% 60–74 years	% 75 years +
Les Baumettes	21,22%	36,23%	27,24%	10,06%	5,25%
Le Cabot	19,27%	25,90%	28,02%	16,68%	10,13%
Carpiagne	29,02%	64,25%	6,74%	0,0%	0,0%
Mazargues	22,18%	27,50%	26,29%	14,21%	9,81%
La Panouse	22,09%	24,61%	25,74%	17,20%	10,36%
Le Redon	19,25%	47,19%	20,04%	9,23%	4,29%
Sainte-Marguerite	22,38%	26,24%	24,24%	15,73%	11,41%
Sormiou	32,08%	26,95%	26,19%	10,80%	3,98%
Vaufrèges	19,89%	27,29%	30,46%	14,96%	7,39%
Arrondissement	22,18%	29,03%	25,53%	14,21%	9,06%
Total Marseille	23,16%	28,67%	24,84%	14,18%	9,16%
