= Roquevaire =

Commune in Provence-Alpes-Côte d'Azur, France

Roquevaire Ròcavaira (Occitan)
- Commune
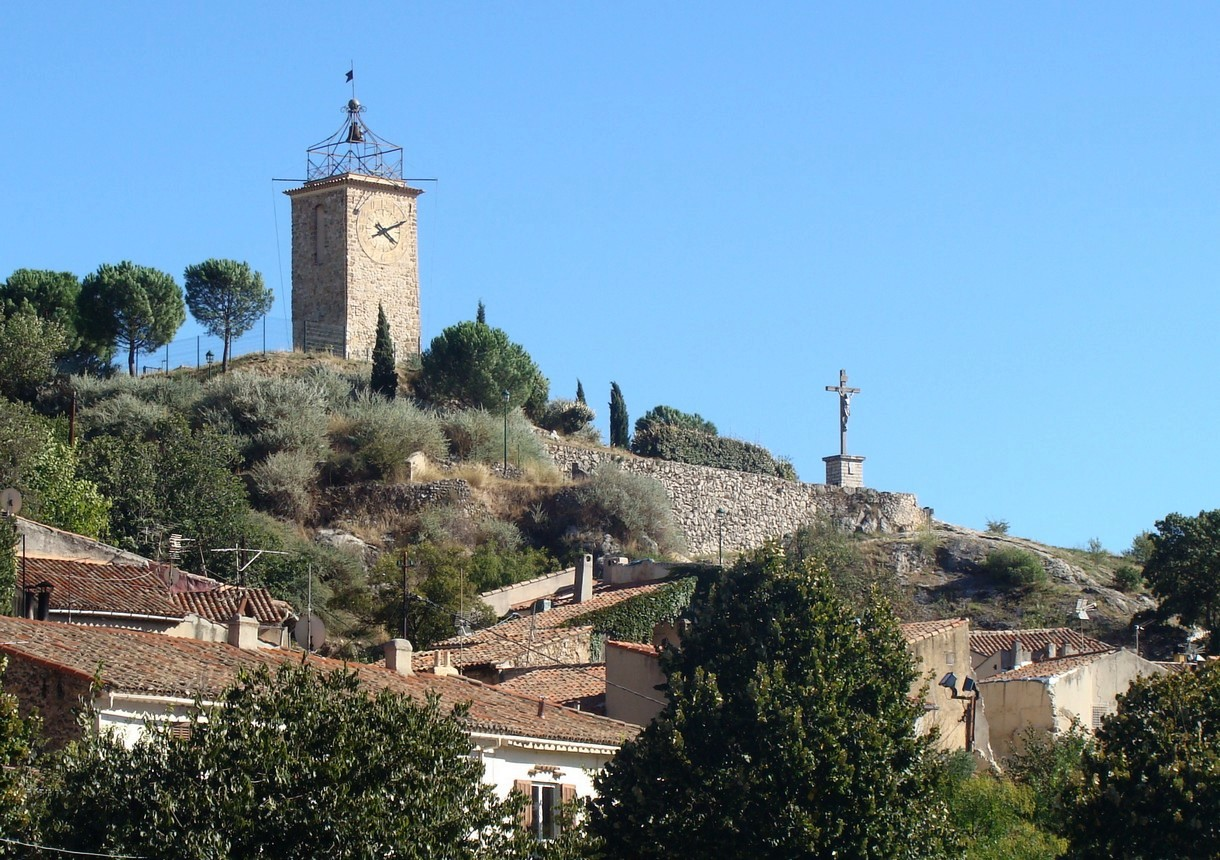
- A view of Roquevaire

- Coat of arms
- Location of Roquevaire
- Location within France Location within Provence-Alpes-Côte d'Azur
- Coordinates: 43°21′00″N 5°36′19″E
- Country: France
- Region: Provence-Alpes-Côte d'Azur
- Department: Bouches-du-Rhône
- Arrondissement: Marseille
- Canton: Aubagne
- Intercommunality: Aix-Marseille-Provence

Government
  - Mayor (2026–32): Eric Bouillé
- Area^{1}: 23.83 km^{2} (9.20 sq mi)
- Elevation: 160 m (520 ft)
- Highest elevation: 732 m (2,402 ft)
- Lowest elevation: 134 m (440 ft)
- Population (2023): 8,915
  - Density: 374.1/km^{2} (968.9/sq mi)
- Time zone: UTC+01:00 (CET)
  - Summer (DST): UTC+02:00 (CEST)
- INSEE/Postal code: 13086 /13360
- Dialling codes: (+33) 04
- ^{1} French Land Register data, which excludes lakes, ponds, glaciers > 1 km^{2} (0.386 sq mi or 247 acres) and river estuaries.

Roquevaire (French pronunciation: [ʁɔk(ə)vɛʁ]; Occitan: Ròcavaira) is a commune in the Huveaune valley between Aubagne and Auriol in the Bouches-du-Rhône department in the Provence-Alpes-Côte d'Azur region of Southern France.

== Geography ==
The villages of Lascours, Pont-de-l'Étoile and Pont-de-Joux are located within the commune of Roquevaire. In 2023, Roquevaire will be served by two stations of the Aubagne tramway when the northern Line T extension opens.

== Tourism ==
The main attraction is the organ in the Saint Vincent Church, which is the largest organ in France. The town features an international organ festival in September.

== Population ==
Its inhabitants are called Roquevairois and Roquevairoises in French.

Historical population

Year	Pop.	±% p.a.
1793	3,065	—
1800	2,711	−1.74%
1806	2,813	+0.62%
1821	2,842	+0.07%
1831	3,218	+1.25%
1836	3,120	−0.62%
1841	3,143	+0.15%
1846	3,130	−0.08%
1851	3,180	+0.32%
1856	3,175	−0.03%
1861	3,465	+1.76%
1866	3,635	+0.96%
1872	3,499	−0.63%
1876	3,558	+0.42%
1881	3,350	−1.20%
1886	3,436	+0.51%
1891	3,115	−1.94%
1896	3,012	−0.67%
1901	2,973	−0.26%

Year	Pop.	±% p.a.
1906	3,110	+0.91%
1911	2,969	−0.92%
1921	2,600	−1.32%
1926	2,645	+0.34%
1931	2,613	−0.24%
1936	2,608	−0.04%
1946	2,521	−0.34%
1954	3,080	+2.54%
1962	3,408	+1.27%
1968	3,854	+2.07%
1975	5,042	+3.91%
1982	5,619	+1.56%
1990	7,061	+2.90%
1999	7,853	+1.19%
2007	8,373	+0.80%
2012	8,693	+0.75%
2017	9,003	+0.70%
2023	8,915	−0.16%

Source: EHESS and INSEE (1968-2023)

== See also ==
- Communes of the Bouches-du-Rhône department
