= La Penne-sur-Huveaune =

Commune in Provence-Alpes-Côte d'Azur, France

- Commune
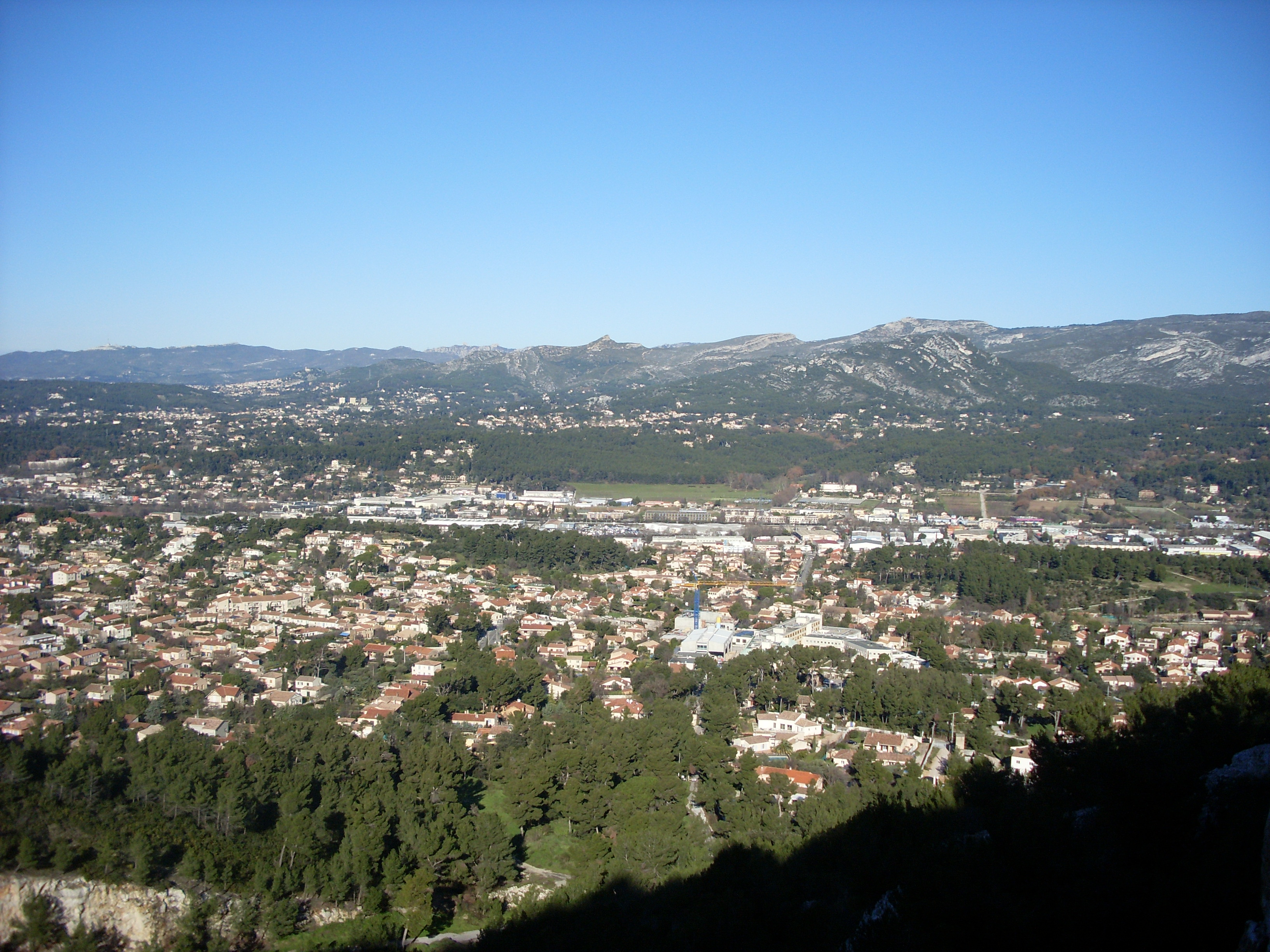
- La Penne-sur-Huveaune viewed from the summit of a nearby hill

- Coat of arms
- Location of La Penne-sur-Huveaune
- Location within France Location within Provence-Alpes-Côte d'Azur
- Coordinates: 43°16′50″N 5°30′57″E
- Country: France
- Region: Provence-Alpes-Côte d'Azur
- Department: Bouches-du-Rhône
- Arrondissement: Marseille
- Canton: Aubagne
- Intercommunality: Aix-Marseille-Provence

Government
  - Mayor (2026–32): Frédéric Szabo
- Area^{1}: 3.56 km^{2} (1.37 sq mi)
- Elevation: 105 m (344 ft)
- Highest elevation: 404 m (1,325 ft)
- Lowest elevation: 70 m (230 ft)
- Population (2023): 6,605
  - Density: 1,860/km^{2} (4,810/sq mi)
- Time zone: UTC+01:00 (CET)
  - Summer (DST): UTC+02:00 (CEST)
- INSEE/Postal code: 13070 /13821
- Dialling codes: 0491
- ^{1} French Land Register data, which excludes lakes, ponds, glaciers > 1 km^{2} (0.386 sq mi or 247 acres) and river estuaries.

La Penne-sur-Huveaune (French pronunciation: [la pɛn syʁ yvon], literally La Penne on Huveaune; Provençal: La Pena d’Evèuna) is a commune east of Marseille and west of Aubagne along the A50 autoroute in the department of Bouches-du-Rhône in the Provence-Alpes-Côte d'Azur region in southern France.

The river Huveaune flows through it, from which the commune derived its name.

== Population ==
Historical population

Year	Pop.	±% p.a.
1793	670	—
1800	664	−0.13%
1806	644	−0.51%
1821	670	+0.26%
1831	715	+0.65%
1836	698	−0.48%
1841	722	+0.68%
1846	759	+1.00%
1851	807	+1.23%
1856	768	−0.99%
1861	832	+1.61%
1866	791	−1.01%
1872	782	−0.19%
1876	770	−0.39%
1881	739	−0.82%
1886	697	−1.16%
1891	720	+0.65%
1896	731	+0.30%
1901	847	+2.99%

Year	Pop.	±% p.a.
1906	875	+0.65%
1911	778	−2.32%
1921	983	+2.37%
1926	1,452	+8.11%
1931	1,657	+2.68%
1936	1,824	+1.94%
1946	2,516	+3.27%
1954	3,078	+2.55%
1962	3,736	+2.45%
1968	4,489	+3.11%
1975	5,095	+1.83%
1982	5,782	+1.82%
1990	5,879	+0.21%
1999	6,005	+0.24%
2007	6,228	+0.46%
2012	6,300	+0.23%
2017	6,436	+0.43%
2023	6,605	+0.43%

Source: EHESS and INSEE (1968-2023)

== See also ==
- Communes of the Bouches-du-Rhône department
