= Cuges-les-Pins =

Commune in Provence-Alpes-Côte d'Azur, France

Cuges-les-Pins Cuja (Occitan)
- Commune
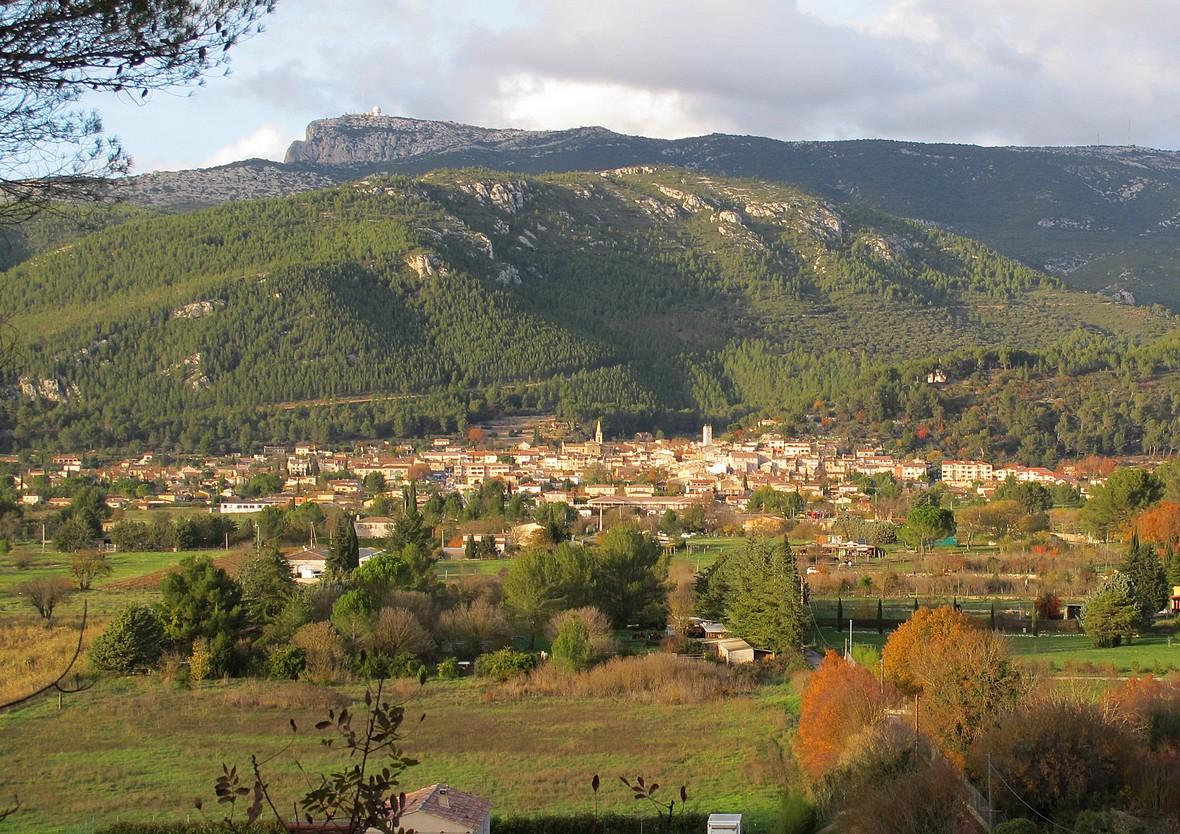
- A view of Cuges-les-Pins with the Sainte-Baume in the background

- Coat of arms
- Location of Cuges-les-Pins
- Location within France Location within Provence-Alpes-Côte d'Azur
- Coordinates: 43°16′38″N 5°42′05″E
- Country: France
- Region: Provence-Alpes-Côte d'Azur
- Department: Bouches-du-Rhône
- Arrondissement: Marseille
- Canton: La Ciotat
- Intercommunality: Aix-Marseille-Provence

Government
  - Mayor (2026–32): Bernard Destrost
- Area^{1}: 38.81 km^{2} (14.98 sq mi)
- Elevation: 191 m (627 ft)
- Highest elevation: 1,041 m (3,415 ft)
- Lowest elevation: 160 m (520 ft)
- Population (2023): 6,236
  - Density: 160.7/km^{2} (416.2/sq mi)
- Time zone: UTC+01:00 (CET)
  - Summer (DST): UTC+02:00 (CEST)
- INSEE/Postal code: 13030 /13780
- Dialling codes: 0491
- ^{1} French Land Register data, which excludes lakes, ponds, glaciers > 1 km^{2} (0.386 sq mi or 247 acres) and river estuaries.

Cuges-les-Pins (French pronunciation: [kyʒ le pɛ̃]; lit. 'Cuges-the-Pines'; Occitan: Cuja), commonly referred to simply as Cuges, is a commune in the Bouches-du-Rhône department in the Provence-Alpes-Côte d'Azur region in Southern France. It is situated 27 km (17 mi) east of Marseille, on the departmental border with Var.

== History ==
On 1 August 1794, Mayor Joseph-Jean Monfray performed the wedding of Julie Clary and Joseph Bonaparte, brother of Napoléon Bonaparte, in Cuges-les-Pins (Mayor Monfray was later convicted on charges of bribery and corruption). Julie Clary and Joseph Bonaparte would later reign over Naples (1806–1808) and Spain (1808–1813) as Queen consort and King, respectively.

== Demographics ==
Historical population

Year	Pop.	±% p.a.
1793	1,540	—
1800	1,486	−0.51%
1806	1,504	+0.20%
1821	1,735	+0.96%
1831	1,855	+0.67%
1836	1,804	−0.56%
1841	1,709	−1.08%
1846	1,666	−0.51%
1851	1,692	+0.31%
1856	1,603	−1.07%
1861	1,538	−0.82%
1866	1,501	−0.49%
1872	1,450	−0.57%
1876	1,434	−0.28%
1881	1,302	−1.91%
1886	1,260	−0.65%
1891	1,207	−0.86%
1896	1,119	−1.50%
1901	997	−2.28%

Year	Pop.	±% p.a.
1906	935	−1.28%
1911	894	−0.89%
1921	741	−1.86%
1926	808	+1.75%
1931	749	−1.51%
1936	721	−0.76%
1946	754	+0.45%
1954	847	+1.46%
1962	1,109	+3.43%
1968	1,433	+4.36%
1975	1,282	−1.58%
1982	1,875	+5.58%
1990	2,655	+4.44%
1999	3,754	+3.92%
2007	4,708	+2.87%
2012	4,922	+0.89%
2017	5,080	+0.63%
2023	6,236	+3.48%

Source: EHESS and INSEE (1968-2023)

== See also ==
- Communes of the Bouches-du-Rhône department
