= Canton of Aubagne =

Coordinates: 43.29°N 5.57°E

- Canton
- Situation of the canton of Aubagne in the department of Bouches-du-Rhône
- Country: France
- Region: Provence-Alpes-Côte d'Azur
- Department: Bouches-du-Rhône
- No. of communes: {{{nbcomm}}}
- Population (2023): 63,049
- INSEE code: 1305

The canton of Aubagne is an administrative division of the Bouches-du-Rhône department, in southeastern France. It was created at the French canton reorganisation which came into effect in March 2015. Its seat is in Aubagne.

It consists of the following communes:

1. Aubagne
2. La Penne-sur-Huveaune
3. Roquevaire
