= 8th arrondissement of Marseille =

- Municipal arrondissement
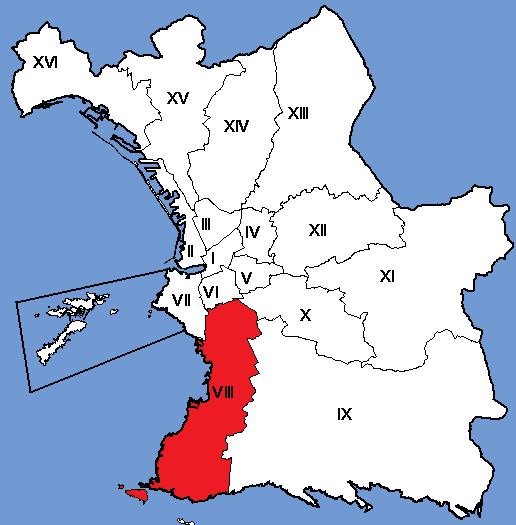
- Location within Marseille
- Interactive map of 8th arrondissement of Marseille
- Coordinates: 43.2565°N 5.3846°E
- Country: France
- Region: Provence-Alpes-Côte d'Azur
- Department: Bouches-du-Rhône
- Commune: Marseille

Government
  - Mayor (2020–2026): Pierre Benarroche (UG)
- Area: 18.55 km^{2} (7.16 sq mi)
- Population (2023): 84,683
  - Density: 4,565/km^{2} (11,820/sq mi)
- INSEE code: 13208

The 8th arrondissement of Marseille is one of the 16 arrondissements of Marseille, France. It covers the southwestern part of the city, and part of the Calanques National Park. It is governed locally together with the 6th arrondissement, with which it forms the 4th sector of Marseille.

== Population ==
Historical population
| Year | Pop. | ±% p.a. |
|---|---|---|
| 1968 | 70,606 | — |
| 1975 | 74,754 | +0.82% |
| 1982 | 76,776 | +0.38% |
| 1990 | 79,081 | +0.37% |
| 1999 | 75,419 | −0.53% |
| 2007 | 78,837 | +0.56% |
| 2012 | 78,065 | −0.20% |
| 2017 | 81,028 | +0.75% |
| 2023 | 84,683 | +0.74% |
Source: INSEE

| Neighbourhood | Population (2022) |
|---|---|
| Bonneveine | 5,665 |
| Les Goudes | 592 |
| Montredon | 5,440 |
| Périer | 13,377 |
| La Plage | 2,732 |
| La Pointe Rouge | 8,598 |
| Le Rouet | 13,703 |
| Saint-Giniez | 15,279 |
| Sainte-Anne | 10,078 |
| Vieille Chapelle | 7,945 |
