= Peypin =

Commune in Provence-Alpes-Côte d'Azur, France

- Commune
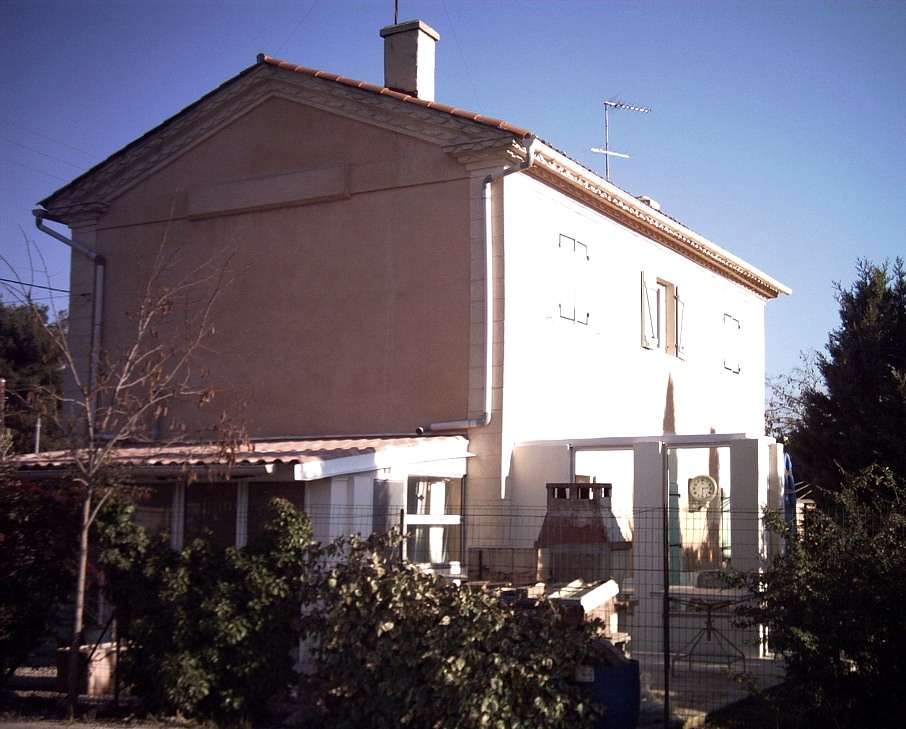
- The passenger building of the old Valdonne railway station in Peypin, on the Aubagne to Fuveau-la Barque line. Today it is private property, but the clock still remains.

- Coat of arms
- Location of Peypin
- Location within France Location within Provence-Alpes-Côte d'Azur
- Coordinates: 43°23′12″N 5°34′45″E
- Country: France
- Region: Provence-Alpes-Côte d'Azur
- Department: Bouches-du-Rhône
- Arrondissement: Marseille
- Canton: Allauch
- Intercommunality: Aix-Marseille-Provence

Government
  - Mayor (2026–32): Frédéric Gibelot
- Area^{1}: 13.35 km^{2} (5.15 sq mi)
- Elevation: 303 m (994 ft)
- Highest elevation: 602 m (1,975 ft)
- Lowest elevation: 216 m (709 ft)
- Population (2023): 5,771
  - Density: 432.3/km^{2} (1,120/sq mi)
- Time zone: UTC+01:00 (CET)
  - Summer (DST): UTC+02:00 (CEST)
- INSEE/Postal code: 13073 /13124
- Dialling codes: 0491
- ^{1} French Land Register data, which excludes lakes, ponds, glaciers > 1 km^{2} (0.386 sq mi or 247 acres) and river estuaries.

Peypin (French pronunciation: [pɛpɛ̃]) is a commune in the Bouches-du-Rhône department in the Provence-Alpes-Côte d'Azur region of France.

== Population ==
Its inhabitants are called Peypinois in French. In 1870 the commune of La Destrousse was formed from part of Peypin.

Historical population

Year	Pop.	±% p.a.
1793	652	—
1800	776	+2.52%
1806	669	−2.44%
1821	844	+1.56%
1831	960	+1.30%
1836	990	+0.62%
1841	966	−0.49%
1846	979	+0.27%
1851	1,001	+0.45%
1856	1,104	+1.98%
1861	1,194	+1.58%
1866	1,460	+4.10%
1872	704	−11.45%
1876	752	+1.66%
1881	828	+1.94%
1886	823	−0.12%
1891	843	+0.48%
1896	863	+0.47%
1901	949	+1.92%

Year	Pop.	±% p.a.
1906	991	+0.87%
1911	997	+0.12%
1921	1,320	+2.85%
1926	1,494	+2.51%
1931	1,187	−4.50%
1936	1,064	−2.16%
1946	1,014	−0.48%
1954	1,385	+3.97%
1962	1,304	−0.75%
1968	1,365	+0.76%
1975	2,018	+5.74%
1982	2,629	+3.85%
1990	4,155	+5.89%
1999	4,956	+1.98%
2007	5,296	+0.83%
2012	5,397	+0.38%
2017	5,495	+0.36%
2023	5,771	+0.82%

Source: EHESS and INSEE (1968-2023)

== See also ==
- Communes of the Bouches-du-Rhône department
