= 14th arrondissement of Marseille =

- Municipal arrondissement
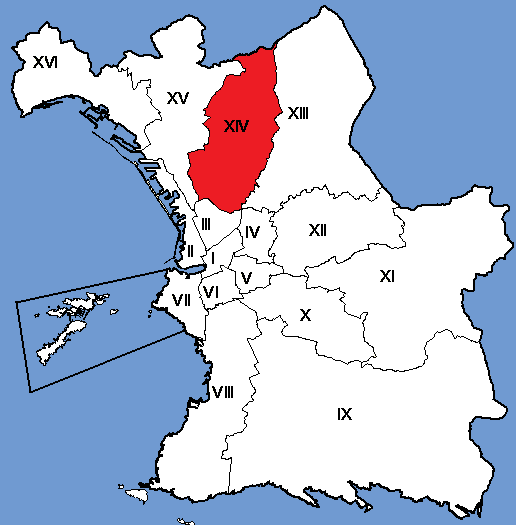
- Location within Marseille
- Interactive map of 14th arrondissement of Marseille
- Coordinates: 43.3426°N 5.3887°E
- Country: France
- Region: Provence-Alpes-Côte d'Azur
- Department: Bouches-du-Rhône
- Commune: Marseille

Government
  - Mayor (2020–2026): Marion Bareille (LR)
- Area: 16.39 km^{2} (6.33 sq mi)
- Population (2023): 60,505
  - Density: 3,692/km^{2} (9,561/sq mi)
- INSEE code: 13214

The 14th arrondissement of Marseille is one of the 16 arrondissements of Marseille. It is governed locally together with the 13th arrondissement, with which it forms the 7th sector of Marseille.

== Population ==
Historical population
Year	Pop.	±% p.a.
1968	61,769	—
1975	70,948	+2.00%
1982	67,552	−0.70%
1990	56,995	−2.10%
1999	56,747	−0.05%
2007	61,920	+1.10%
2012	60,949	−0.32%
2017	62,951	+0.65%
2023	60,505	−0.66%
Source: INSEE

Neighbourhood	Population (2022)
Les Arnavaux	5,630
Bon-Secours	8,997
Le Canet	7,982
Le Merlan	9,970
Saint-Barthélémy	16,468
Saint-Joseph	4,466
Sainte-Marthe	5,713

== Education ==
The private Catholic school École Tour-Sainte is in the 14th arrondissement.

== Demographics ==
Euronews claimed in August 2021 that the 14th arrondissement is "one of the city's most deprived".

== Drug Trafficking ==
Marseille is frequently affected by score-settling linked to drug trafficking. A total of 17 drug-related homicides were recorded in the city in 2025.
