= 11th arrondissement of Marseille =

- Municipal arrondissement
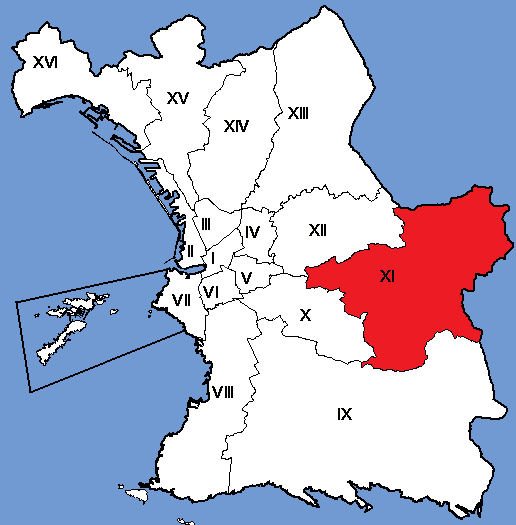
- Location within Marseille
- Interactive map of 11th arrondissement of Marseille
- Coordinates: 43.285032°N 5.488225°E
- Country: France
- Region: Provence-Alpes-Côte d'Azur
- Department: Bouches-du-Rhône
- Commune: Marseille

Government
  - Mayor (2026-2032): Olivier Rioult ((Rassemblement national))
- Area: 29.86 km^{2} (11.53 sq mi)
- Population (2023): 59,883
  - Density: 2,005/km^{2} (5,194/sq mi)
- INSEE code: 13211

The 11th arrondissement of Marseille is one of the 16 arrondissements of Marseille. It is governed locally together with the 12th arrondissement, with which it forms the 6th sector of Marseille.

== Population ==
Historical population
Year	Pop.	±% p.a.
1968	35,435	—
1975	44,540	+3.32%
1982	50,757	+1.88%
1990	51,185	+0.11%
1999	53,547	+0.50%
2007	56,792	+0.74%
2012	56,835	+0.02%
2017	56,790	−0.02%
2023	59,883	+0.89%
Source: INSEE

Neighbourhood	Population (2022)
Les Accates	2,145
La Barasse	2,263
Les Camoins	5,419
Éoures	1,524
La Millière	2,852
La Pomme	18,672
Saint-Marcel	10,218
Saint-Menet	2,928
La Treille	972
La Valbarelle	8,768
La Valentine	3,266
