= 5th arrondissement of Marseille =

- Municipal arrondissement
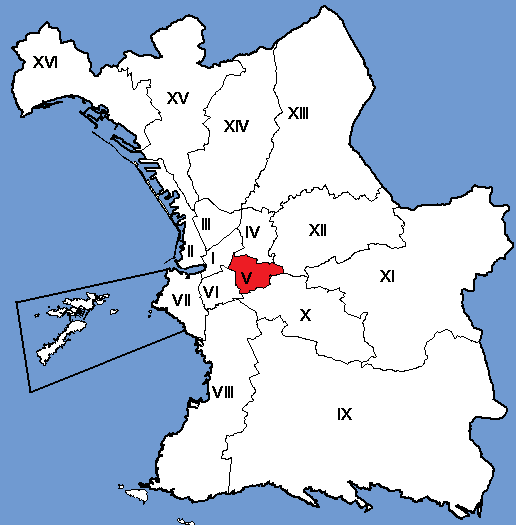
- Location within Marseille
- Interactive map of 5th arrondissement of Marseille
- Coordinates: 43.2917°N 5.3966°E
- Country: France
- Region: Provence-Alpes-Côte d'Azur
- Department: Bouches-du-Rhône
- Commune: Marseille

Government
  - Mayor (2020–2026): Didier Jau (EELV)
- Area: 2.24 km^{2} (0.86 sq mi)
- Population (2023): 45,702
  - Density: 20,400/km^{2} (52,800/sq mi)
- INSEE code: 13205

The 5th arrondissement of Marseille is one of the 16 arrondissements of Marseille. It is governed locally together with the 4th arrondissement, with which it forms the 3rd sector of Marseille.

== Population ==
Historical population
Year	Pop.	±% p.a.
1968	55,017	—
1975	52,804	−0.58%
1982	48,371	−1.24%
1990	40,186	−2.29%
1999	41,370	+0.32%
2007	44,583	+0.94%
2012	46,460	+0.83%
2017	46,199	−0.11%
2023	45,702	−0.18%
Source: INSEE

Neighbourhood	Population (2022)
Baille	9,803
Le Camas	15,714
Conception	10,484
Saint-Pierre	9,017
