= 13th arrondissement of Marseille =

- Municipal arrondissement
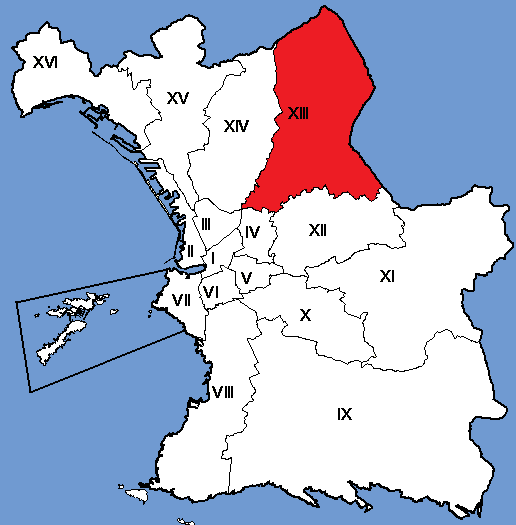
- Location within Marseille
- Interactive map of 13th arrondissement of Marseille
- Coordinates: 43.3650°N 5.4254°E
- Country: France
- Region: Provence-Alpes-Côte d'Azur
- Department: Bouches-du-Rhône
- Commune: Marseille

Government
  - Mayor (2020–2026): Marion Bareille (LR)
- Area: 28.08 km^{2} (10.84 sq mi)
- Population (2023): 95,112
  - Density: 3,387/km^{2} (8,773/sq mi)
- INSEE code: 13213

The 13th arrondissement of Marseille is one of the 16 arrondissements of Marseille. It is governed locally together with the 14th arrondissement, with which it forms the 7th sector of Marseille.

== Population ==
Historical population
Year	Pop.	±% p.a.
1968	73,640	—
1975	82,915	+1.71%
1982	83,517	+0.10%
1990	78,823	−0.72%
1999	79,955	+0.16%
2007	89,316	+1.39%
2012	90,122	+0.18%
2017	91,992	+0.41%
2023	95,112	+0.56%
Source: INSEE

Neighbourhood	Population (2022)
Château Gombert	8,498
La Croix-Rouge	7,023
Malpassé	9,941
Les Médecins	1,385
Les Mourets	1,804
Les Olives	15,176
Palama	2,469
La Rose	13,528
Saint-Jérôme	9,439
Saint-Just	15,275
Saint-Mitre	8,881
