= 12th arrondissement of Marseille =

Municipal arrondissement in France

- Municipal arrondissement
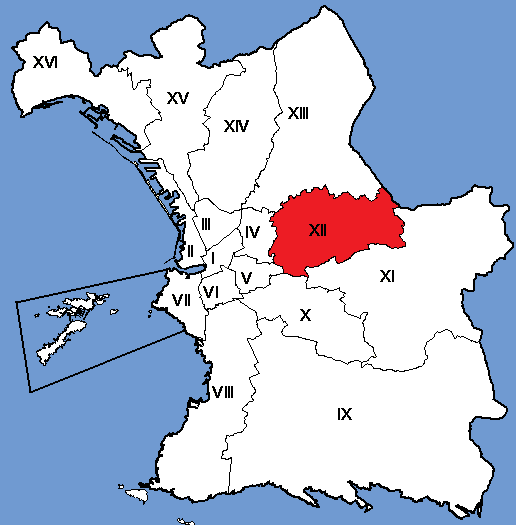
- Location within Marseille
- Interactive map of 12th arrondissement of Marseille
- Coordinates: 43.307185°N 5.425376°E
- Country: France
- Region: Provence-Alpes-Côte d'Azur
- Department: Bouches-du-Rhône
- Commune: Marseille

Government
  - Mayor (2026-2032): Olivier Rioult ((Rassemblement national))
- Area: 14.00 km^{2} (5.41 sq mi)
- Population (2023): 64,399
  - Density: 4,600/km^{2} (11,910/sq mi)
- INSEE code: 13212

The 12th arrondissement of Marseille (French: 12e arrondissement de Marseille, "douzième", [duzjɛm‿aʁɔ̃dismɑ̃ də maʁsɛj]), commonly known as Marseille 12, is one of the 16 arrondissements of Marseille. It is governed locally together with the 11th arrondissement, with which it forms the 6th sector of Marseille.

== Population ==
Historical population
Year	Pop.	±% p.a.
1968	57,450	—
1975	59,618	+0.53%
1982	57,928	−0.41%
1990	55,897	−0.45%
1999	56,441	+0.11%
2007	58,734	+0.50%
2012	60,528	+0.60%
2017	60,634	+0.04%
2023	64,399	+1.01%
Source: INSEE

Neighbourhood	Population (2022)
Les Caillols	10,893
La Fourragère	8,070
Montolivet	12,486
Saint-Barnabé	12,003
Saint-Jean du Désert	4,019
Saint-Julien	10,700
Les Trois-Lucs	6,101
