= Municipal arrondissements of France =

Territorial subdivision of some French communes

In France, a municipal arrondissement (French: arrondissement municipal [aʁɔ̃dismɑ̃ mynisipal]) is a subdivision of the commune, and is used in the country's three largest cities: Paris, Lyon and Marseille. It functions as an even lower administrative division, with its own mayor. Although usually referred to simply as "arrondissements", they should not be confused with departmental arrondissements, which are groupings of communes within one département.

== General characteristics ==
There are 45 municipal arrondissements in France: 20 in Paris (see: Arrondissements of Paris), nine in Lyon (see: Arrondissements of Lyon), and 16 in Marseille. However, a law in 1987 assigned the 16 arrondissements of Marseille to eight secteurs ("areas"), two arrondissements per secteur. Thus, in effect, Marseille can be more properly described as being divided into eight secteurs, the sixteen arrondissements having been made merely units of demarcation.

Area

- The largest arrondissement is the ninth arrondissement of Marseille: 63.21 km^{2} (24.4 sq. miles, or 15,620 acres), which is 26 percent of the size of the city of Marseille, and is 60 percent the size of the city of Paris (including the Bois de Boulogne and Bois de Vincennes). It contains the Luminy Park, which is a protected park, and the calanques of Marseille.
- The smallest arrondissement is the second arrondissement of Paris: 0.992 km^{2} (0.383 sq. miles, or 245 acres).

Population

- The most populous arrondissement is the fifteenth arrondissement of Paris, with 225,362 inhabitants at the 1999 census. If the 15th arrondissement of Paris were a commune, it would be the ninth most-populous commune of France, larger than the cities of Bordeaux, Lille, and Grenoble.
- The least populous arrondissement is the 16th arrondissement of Marseille, with only 16,002 inhabitants (2019). However, the 16th arrondissement is part of the eighth secteur of Marseille (92,109 inhabitants in 2017), and is not really administered by itself, as explained above. The second least populous arrondissement in France is the first arrondissement of Paris, with 15,917 inhabitants (2019); however, It is also governed together with the 2nd, 3rd and 4th arrondissements as 1st sector of Paris (Paris-Centre; 100,196 inhabitants in 2017).

Density

- The arrondissement with the highest population density is the 11th arrondissement of Paris, with 40,672 residents per km^{2} (105,339 per sq. miles) in 1999.
- The arrondissement with the lowest population density is the ninth arrondissement of Marseille, with 1,151 residents per km^{2} (2,981 per sq. miles) in 1999.

The twenty arrondissements of Paris

Municipal arrondissements have names only in Paris and are seldom used even there. In Paris, residents are very familiar with the arrondissements and, when asked where they live, they will almost always answer with the number. In Lyon, three arrondissements – Vieux Lyon (fifth), la Croix Rousse (fourth) and Vaise (ninth) – are generally referred to by those names, and the others are referred to by number. In Marseille, it is common for people to refer to the names of the neighborhoods, such as Ste. Anne or Mazargues, but also to the number of the arrondissements.

Municipal arrondissements are used in the five-digit postal codes of France. The first two digits are the number of the département in which the address is located (75 for Paris; 69 for Rhône in which Lyon is located; 13 for Bouches-du-Rhône in which Marseille is located); the last three digits are the number of the arrondissement so the postal code of a person living in the 5th arrondissement of Paris is "75005 Paris", and for a person living in the 14th arrondissement of Marseille it will be "13014 Marseille". The only exception is the 16th arrondissement of Paris, which is divided between two postal codes because of its size: "75016 Paris", in the south of the arrondissement, and "75116 Paris", in the north of the arrondissement.

The 16 arrondissements and the 8 secteurs of Marseille.

The arrondissements of Paris form a clockwise spiral or snail pattern beginning from the first in the centre. In Marseille, they form a meandering path from the first down through the southwest, to the southeast, northeast and finally to the northwest. The arrondissements of Lyon do not form any discernible pattern at all, and only two pairs of arrondissements with a common border have consecutive numbers: the first and the second as well as the seventh and the eighth.

Some other large cities of France are also divided between several postal codes, but the postal codes do not correspond to arrondissements.

== History ==
The twelve former arrondissements of Paris (between 1795 and 1860).

The first municipal arrondissements were created on 22 August 1795 when the city (commune) of Paris was split into twelve arrondissements. At the time, the National Convention was wary of the municipalities in big cities because of their revolutionary moods (Paris) or because of their counter-revolutionary leanings (Lyon and many other cities in the provinces), and so the Convention decided to split the large cities (communes) of France into smaller communes. Paris, unlike the other large cities, was not split into smaller communes, but into arrondissements, a newly created category, and the central municipality was abolished.

In 1805 Napoleon reunited all the large cities of France, but Paris was left divided. Eventually, in 1834, the city (commune) of Paris was reunited, with a municipal council for the whole city, but without a mayor, the municipality being ruled by the prefect of the department of Seine and by the Prefecture of Police. The twelve arrondissements were preserved, being needed for the local administration of people in such a large and populous city as Paris.

On 31 December 1859, the central government enlarged the city of Paris, annexing the suburban communes surrounding Paris, and the arrondissements were reorganised due to the enlargement. Twenty arrondissements with new boundaries were set up and they are still the arrondissements found today in Paris.

| The nine arrondissements of Lyon |

Arrondissements of Lyon

In the case of Lyon, in 1852, after more than fifty years of hesitation, the central government finally allowed Lyon to annex its immediate suburbs, which had become extremely populous due to the Industrial Revolution. The commune of Lyon annexed the communes of Croix-Rousse, La Guillotière, and Vaise. Wary of the new size of the city and the power held by the municipality, the central government decided to divide Lyon into five arrondissements, and the office of mayor of Lyon was abolished. The prefect of the department of Rhône was left to rule the municipality.

In 1881, the office of mayor of Lyon was re-established, and the commune of Lyon reverted to the standard status of French communes. However, the arrondissements were maintained, still being needed in such a populous city. New arrondissements were created in Lyon in 1867, 1912 and 1957 by splitting the third and seventh arrondissements. In 1963, Lyon annexed the commune of Saint-Rambert-l'Île-Barbe, and in 1964, the ninth arrondissement of Lyon was created as a result of the annexation, thus reaching the final arrangement of nine arrondissements found in Lyon today.

In 1977, the office of mayor of Paris was re-established after almost 183 years of abolition, but the arrondissements were left untouched.

In 1981, the Socialists won the French general elections and in the following year, they passed several key laws redefining the powers of the regions, departments, and communes, with the clear objective of ushering in a less centralised France. On 31 December 1982, the so-called "PLM Law" (Loi PLM) was passed, where PLM stands for Paris Lyon Marseille. These three communes were given a special status, derogating from the general status of communes, and were officially divided into municipal arrondissements. Where arrondissements already existed, in Paris and Lyon, the law preserved the already existing boundaries. In Marseille, where there were no arrondissements before 1982, sixteen arrondissements were set up.

The municipal arrondissements were given an official status by the law, each with own their town hall (mairie d'arrondissement) and mayor (maire d'arrondissement). For the first time in history, arrondissement councils (conseils d'arrondissement) were created in the arrondissements, directly elected by the inhabitants of each. The city halls (mairies) of Paris, Marseille and Lyon were preserved above the mairies d'arrondissement, with a central mayor for each city overseeing the arrondissements.

In these three cities, the arrondissements were made the administrative unit dealing directly with citizens. For all necessary queries and official business (for example, birth, marriage and death registrations and records), citizens go to their respective mairie d'arrondissement. The city hall (mairie centrale) does not generally have direct contact with the citizens and is in charge of larger matters such as economic development or local taxation. It was felt that the arrondissements should deal with the individual matters of citizens, the local arrondissement town halls being more accessible than the centralised city hall. (See "Rights and duties of the arrondissement council and mayor" below.)

The law was largely welcomed but some wondered why it was applied only to Paris, Lyon and Marseille. These three cities are the largest in France (with 2,125,246 inhabitants in Paris, 798,430 inhabitants in Marseille, and 466,000 inhabitants in Lyon) and the law was meant to have the local administrations become more accessible and tied to their respective citizens. However, many thought the law could have been applied to other populous cities, in particular to the fourth largest city of France, Toulouse (435,000 inhabitants), and the fifth largest city, Nice (342,738 inhabitants); both cities where the central city halls have to deal with a large number of citizens. Nonetheless, to this day only Paris, Lyon and Marseille are divided into municipal arrondissements.

In 1987, a new law assigned the sixteen arrondissements of Marseille to eight secteurs, two arrondissements per secteur, as explained above; and in Marseille there are now only eight mairies d'arrondissement, each one administering both arrondissements of each secteur.

== Status ==
The PLM Law of 1982 governs the status of the municipal arrondissements.

Unlike French communes, municipal arrondissements have no legal "personality" and so they are not considered legal entities, have no legal capacity and have no budget of their own.

The three communes of Paris, Lyon, and Marseille are ruled by a municipal council and a mayor. In Paris the municipal council is called Paris council (conseil de Paris). Each arrondissement (or secteur in Marseille) has an arrondissement council (conseil d'arrondissement) and an arrondissement mayor. Two thirds of the councillors on the arrondissement council are elected inside the arrondissement; the remaining one third is made up of members of the municipal council elected at the commune level above the arrondissements. The arrondissement mayor is elected by the arrondissement council and must be a member of the municipal council of the commune.

The law of 27 February 2002 on local ("proximity") democracy increased the powers of both the arrondissement councils and the arrondissement mayors.

The council and the mayor of the arrondissement have these rights and duties:

- The arrondissement council manages local community facilities (child care centres and public nurseries, sport centres and stadiums, local parks etc.) but must obtain permission from the municipal council before building new facilities.
- The arrondissement council is asked for advice by the municipal council in any project whose completion takes place on the territory of the arrondissement. In particular, the arrondissement council gives an opinion on matters regarding local non-profit associations and on modifications of local zoning (Plan Local d'Urbanisme).
- Arrondissements have a say in social housing: half of the social housing dwellings (council flats) within the territory of the arrondissement are allocated by the arrondissement mayor; the other half is allocated by the mayor of the commune.
- The arrondissement mayor and his deputies are in charge of registering births, deaths and marriages in the arrondissement.
- The arrondissement council can submit written questions to the mayor of the commune on any matter regarding the arrondissement. It can also ask the municipal council to debate over any matter regarding the arrondissement.
- The municipal council and the mayor of the commune can delegate certain powers to the arrondissement councils and mayors.
- The arrondissement council can create neighbourhood committees (conseils de quartier) with people in a given neighbourhood, who meet regularly and draft proposals about life in their neighbourhood.

== See also ==
- Arrondissement
- Arrondissements of France (departmental arrondissements)
- Arrondissements of Paris
- Arrondissements of Lyon
- Arrondissements of Marseille
- Administrative divisions of Quebec - notable are Boroughs of Montreal which are referred to as Arrondissement in French
