= Cantons of the Bouches-du-Rhône department =

The following is a list of the 29 cantons of the Bouches-du-Rhône department, in France, following the French canton reorganisation which came into effect in March 2015:

- Aix-en-Provence-1
- Aix-en-Provence-2
- Allauch
- Arles
- Aubagne
- Berre-l'Étang
- Châteaurenard
- La Ciotat
- Gardanne
- Istres
- Marignane
- Marseille-1
- Marseille-2
- Marseille-3
- Marseille-4
- Marseille-5
- Marseille-6
- Marseille-7
- Marseille-8
- Marseille-9
- Marseille-10
- Marseille-11
- Marseille-12
- Martigues
- Pélissanne
- Salon-de-Provence-1
- Salon-de-Provence-2
- Trets
- Vitrolles
