= Chardigny =

Chardigny is a French surname. Notable people with the surname include:

- Barthélémy-François Chardigny (1757–1813), French sculptor
- Louis Chardigny (1909–1990), French historian
- Pierre Joseph Chardigny (1794–1866), French sculptor
