= Henri-Prudence Gambey =

French mechanic (1787–1847)

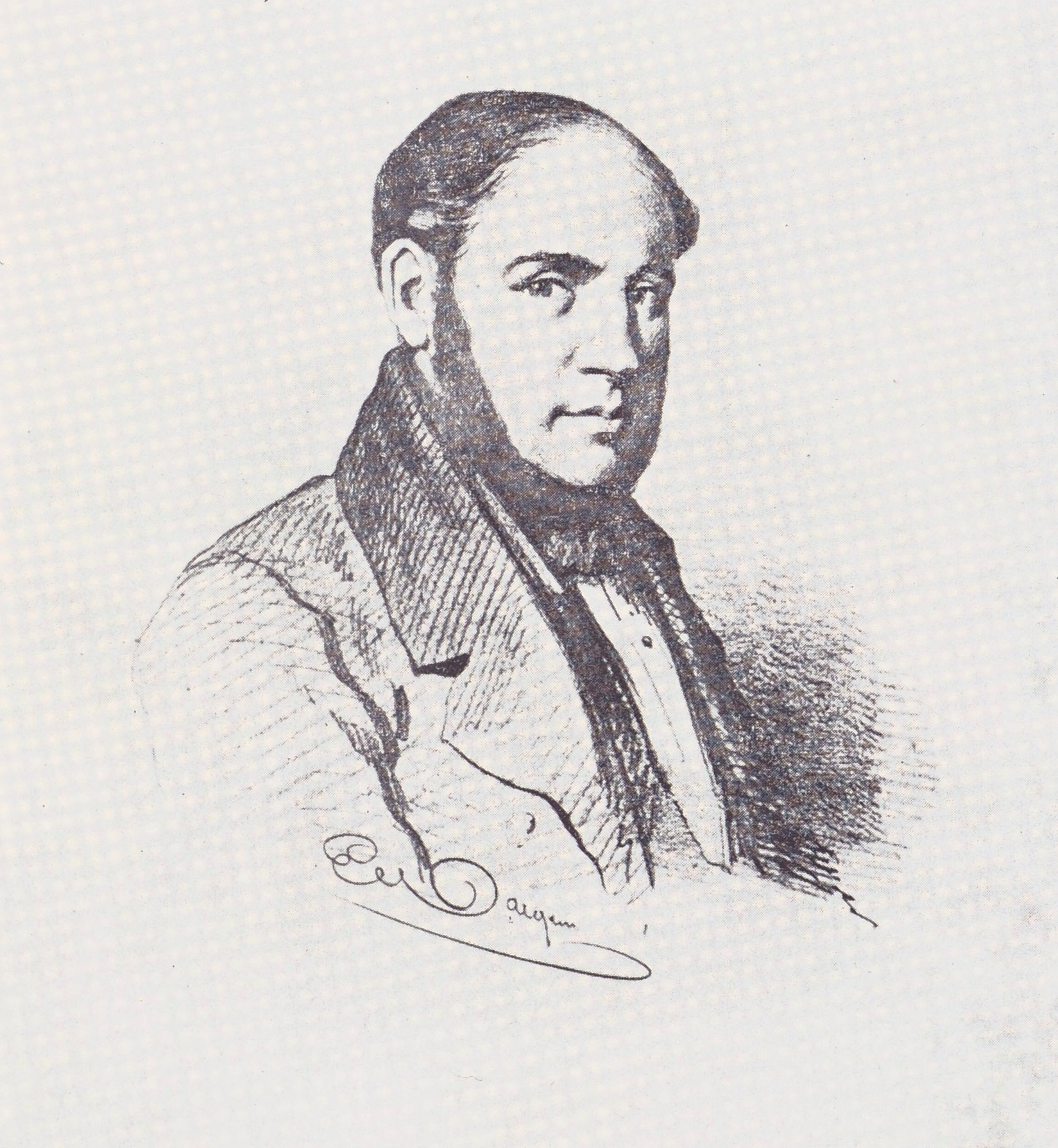
A portrait of Gambey

Henri-Prudence Gambey (8 October 1787 – 29 January 1847) was a French mechanic and scientific instrument maker. His precision instruments made mainly for survey, geomagnetism, and astronomy were used around the world in the early 19th century.

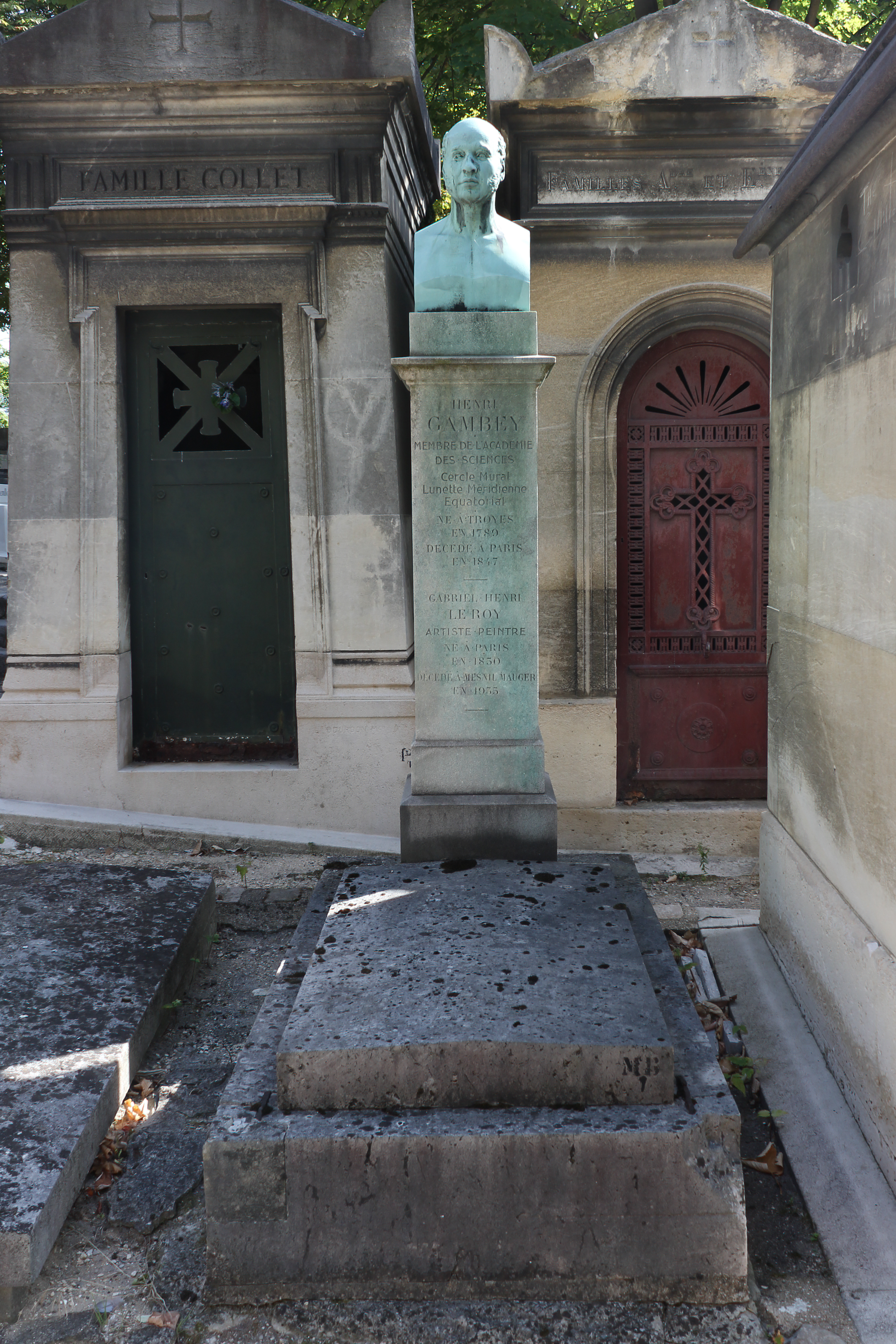
Bust of Gambey at his grave

Gambey was born in Troyes to clockmaker Edme-Prudence Gambey and Marie-Jeanne-Charlotte-Flore Picard. He grew in Larzicourt and worked for some time in the workshop of his father in Vitry-le-François. He learned to draw and design mechanical devices and attracted the attention of engineer Cottenet who suggested that he study in Paris. He went to Ferrat, an instrument maker in Bourg-la-Reine and three weeks later he was made a foreman and construction manager. He then worked with Lenoir and in 1898 he joined the Ecole des Arts et Métiers where he designed a dividing machine and then founded a small workshop at Faubourg Saint-Denis for precision instruments. He began to supply to the navy and observatories. In the 1819 Universal Exhibition at Paris, he exhibited a theodolite, a meridian circle and compasses which won him a gold medal. He collaborated with major scientists of the period, making instruments for Dulong and Petit; a heliostat for Fresnel; and a compass for Coulomb. The survey of the northwest of Canada by John Henry Lefroy made use of his instrument. He sought to emigrate to the United States but was persuaded to stay on by François Arago.

Gambey was made knight of the order of the French Legion of Honor in 1827 and awarded the Lalande Prize for 1830. He also received knighthood from the Belgian King. He is buried at Père Lachaise with a bust by Pierre-Joseph Demongé Chardigny. His widow and a brother continued to run the workshop for some time. A street in Paris in the 11th arrondissement was named after him in 1848 and a rue Gambey was also named in Troyes in 1851.
