= Porte d'Aix =

Triumphal arch and 19th-century national heritage monument in Marseille, France

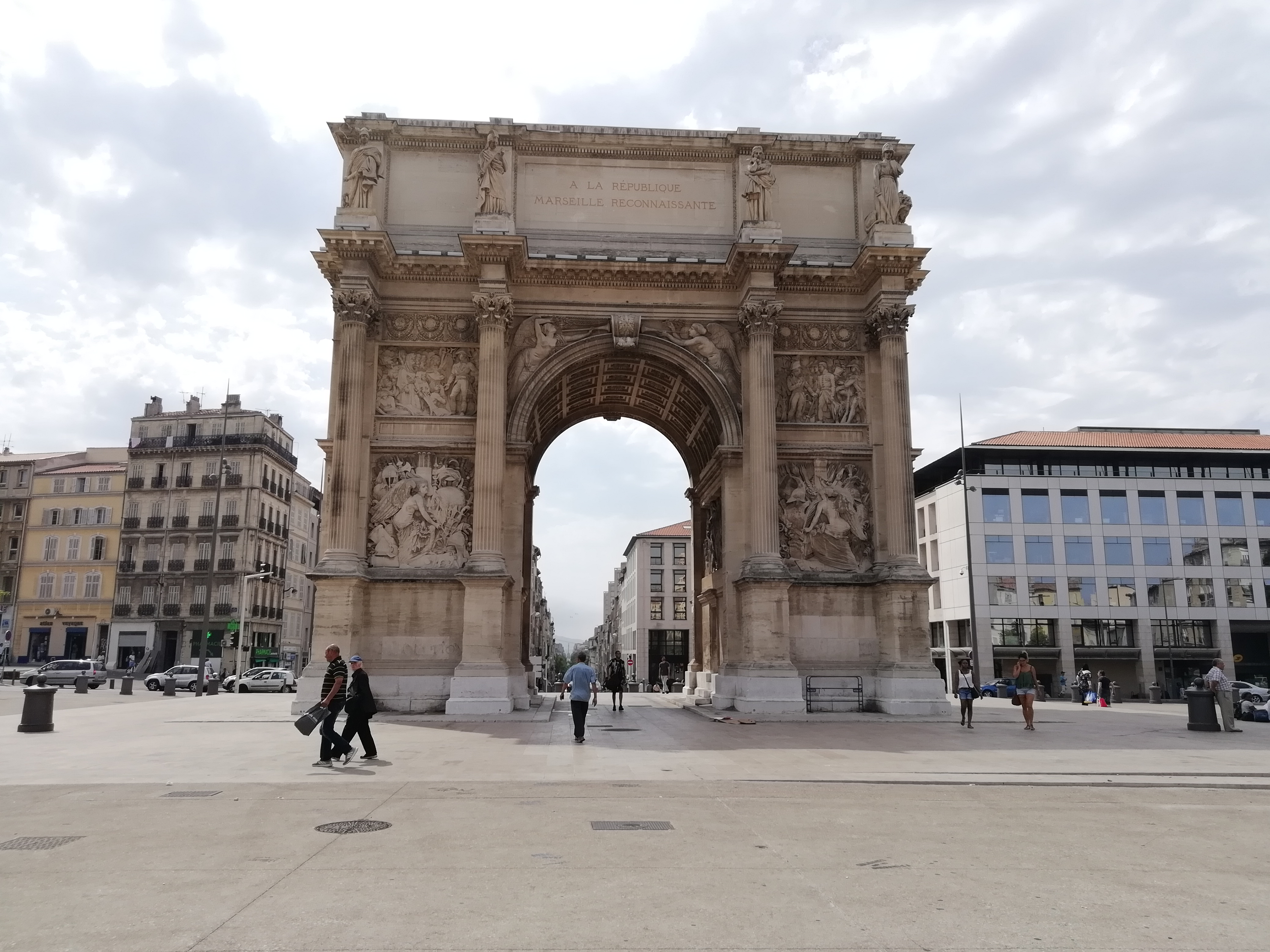
- Porte d'Aix in Marseille, France

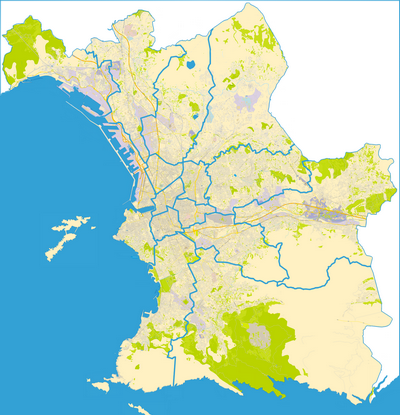
- Location within Marseille Location within France

General information
- Type: Royal triumphal arch
- Location: Marseille, France
- Coordinates: 43°18′06.45″N 05°22′29.15″E
- Construction started: 1825
- Completed: 1839

Design and construction
- Architect: Michel-Robert Penchaud

The Porte d'Aix (French pronunciation: [pɔʁt dɛks]; lit. 'Gate of Aix'; Occitan: Pòrt d'Ais), formerly known as the Porte Royale (Pòrt Reial), is a triumphal arch in Marseille, southern France, marking the old entry point to the city on the road from Aix-en-Provence.

The classical design by Michel-Robert Penchaud was inspired by the triumphal arches of the Roman Empire. The Porte d’Aix was initially conceived in 1784 to honour Louis XVI and to commemorate the Peace of Paris (1783) that ended the American Revolutionary War. Following the restoration of the Bourbon monarchy in 1814–15, the project was resumed in 1823 to commemorate French aid in support of the Spanish King in the Spanish Expedition, notably at the Battle of Trocadero. The arch was eventually completed in 1839, with a more general theme of victory.

== History ==
In 1660 Louis XIV descended on Marseille to bring order to a city in political turmoil. His troops blasted a hole in the old thirteenth century ramparts that ran the length of the rue d'Aix between the city gates of "Porte Royale" and "Porte d'Aix". Part of the subsequent reorganisation of Marseille involved not only an increased military presence, demolition of the old ramparts, new royal shipyards (Arsenal des Galères) and seaward fortifications, but also a new governing body drawn from the merchant class, charged with making plans to expand and beautify the city. From an early stage these plans included the reconstruction of the Porte Royale and the removal of the unsightly overground aqueduct (aqueduc de l'Huveaune) in the place d'Aix at the end of the rue d'Aix: the original porte d'Aix was formed by the arches of this aqueduct. Numerous projects for city plans were proposed, including one by Pierre Puget, placing a ceremonial Porte Royale in the place d'Aix.

Eventually in 1784 the city of Marseille decided to use the profits generated by the sale of the royal shipyards to erect a royal triumphal arch in the place d'Aix "to the glory of Louis XIV and to commemorate the peace gloriously achieved, putting an end to the war of independence in America". Already delayed by local officialdom, the project was abandoned during the French Revolution and Napoleonic rule. Following the restoration of the Bourbon monarchy, the project was resumed in 1823 by the mayor of Marseille, the Marquis de Montgrand, under royal charter from Louis XVIII; this time it was intended to commemorate the victory of Louis-Antoine, Duke of Angoulême, son of the future king Charles X, at the Battle of Trocadero that resulted in the restoration of Ferdinand VII as king of Spain.

The first stone was laid in 1825 by the Marquis de Montgrand with a dedication to the royal family. The aqueduct was demolished three years later to clear the place d'Aix. The project, however, was to suffer yet again from changes in regime in France. Although the main construction work started under Charles X, it was only completed under Louis-Philippe in 1839; and, with the intervening political changes in France, the monument could no longer just celebrate the campaign of the Duke of Angoulême, but instead the more general theme of French victories.

== Architecture ==
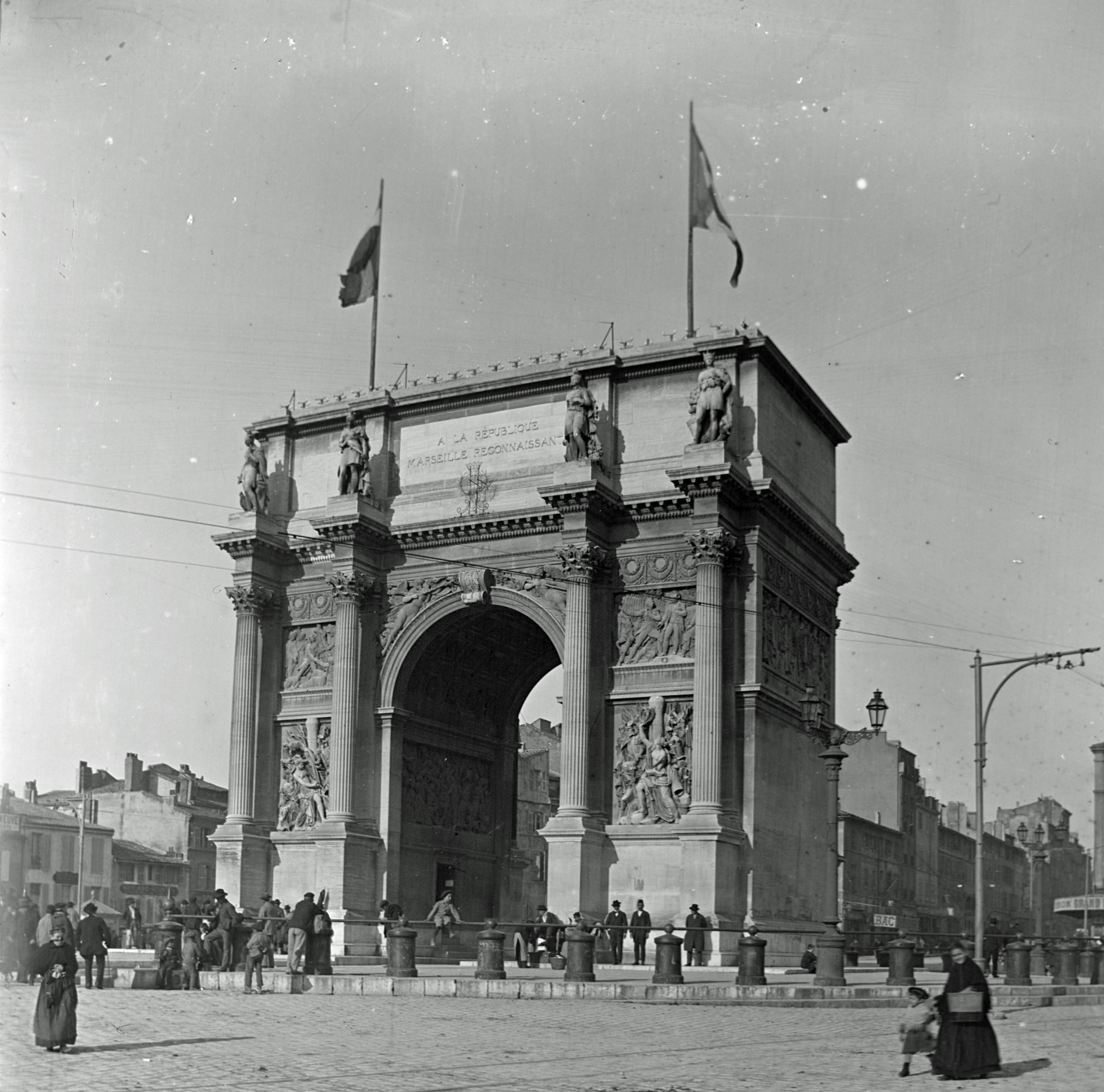
Porte d'Aix around year 1900

Michel-Robert Penchaud, the architect of the monument, probably took as his model the Arch of Titus on the Via Sacra in Rome, although elements are present from other Roman triumphal arches such as the Arches of Trajan and the Arch of Constantine. Responsibility for the stonework was put in the hands of the Italian mason Gaétan Cantini, father of the sculptor Jules Cantini. The ornamental sculpture was entrusted to the Parisian sculptor Antoine-André Marneuf who took his inspiration from the Roman triumphal arch at Orange; the statuary and bas-reliefs were commissioned from David d'Angers and Etienne-Jules Ramey.

The main facades depict the battles of Fleurus, Héliopolis, Marengo and Austerlitz. The two bas-reliefs under the portico depict the call to the defense of liberty (David d'Angers) and the return of the victorious heroes (Ramey). Eight giant allegorical statues, almost 3m high, were placed in the attic representing the Virtues. On the north facade David d'Angers completed Devotion, Prudence, Resignation and Fortitude in 1835; Ramey only finished Vigilance, Clemency, Energy and Temperance on the south facade in 1839. Unfortunately, because the stone was not properly weather-proof, the statues started to erode. In 1921 they were repaired using reinforced concrete; nevertheless in 1937 six of the heads rolled off onto the street below. In later restoration of the arch in 2003, only four of the statues were kept, those of David d'Angers, on the north facade.

Probably because of its location, the triumphal arch is a monument that is often undeservedly overlooked. Composed of a single arch and an attic supported by four corinthian columns, its harmony is inspired by the monuments of antiquity. Its height and width are identical, just under 18m, fitting it precisely with a square, one of the "perfect" geometric forms. It is easy to reach from two metro stations Jules Guesde and Colbert and is in walking distance from the main railway station, Gare de Marseille Saint Charles.

== Gallery of photos ==
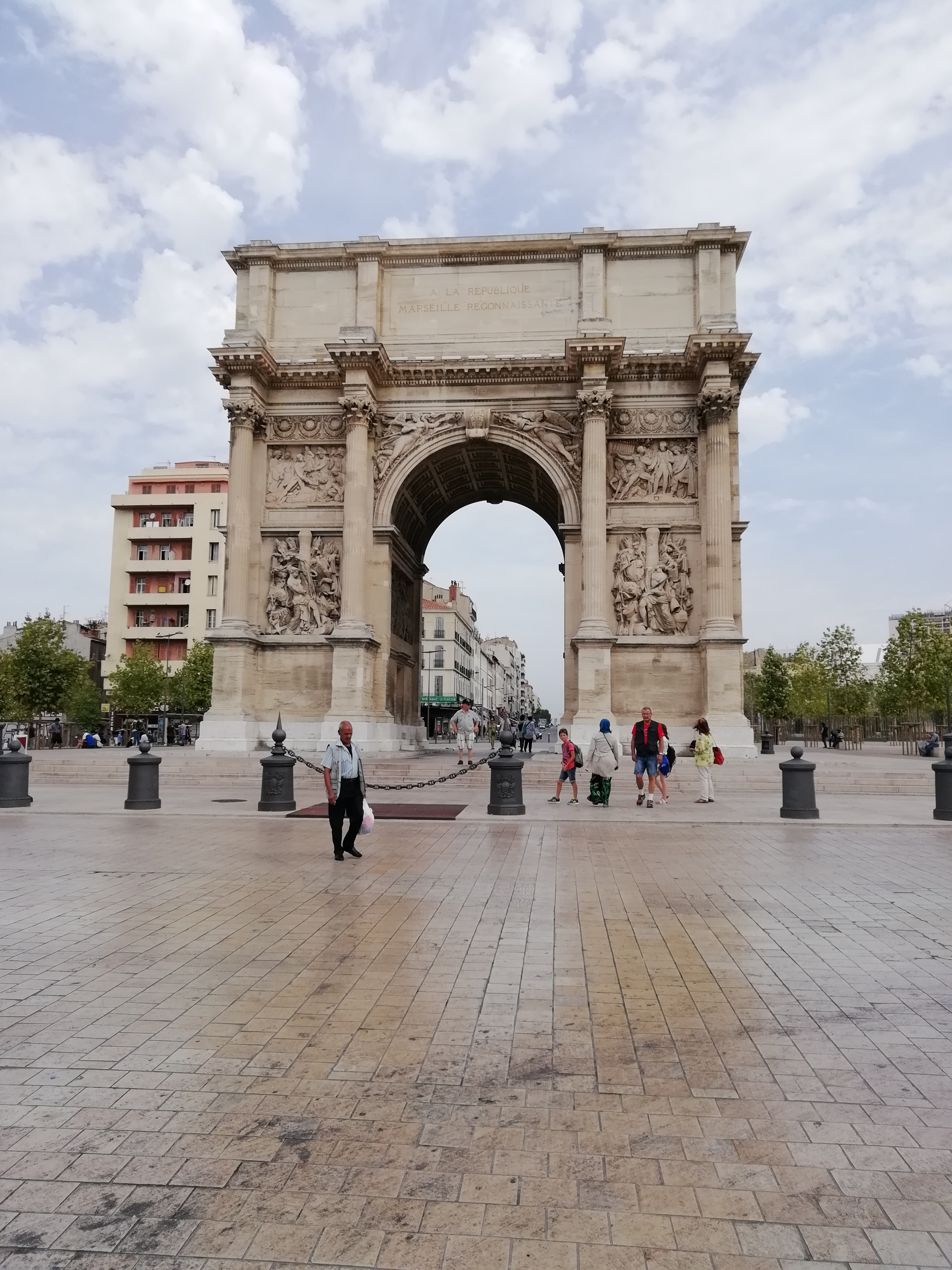

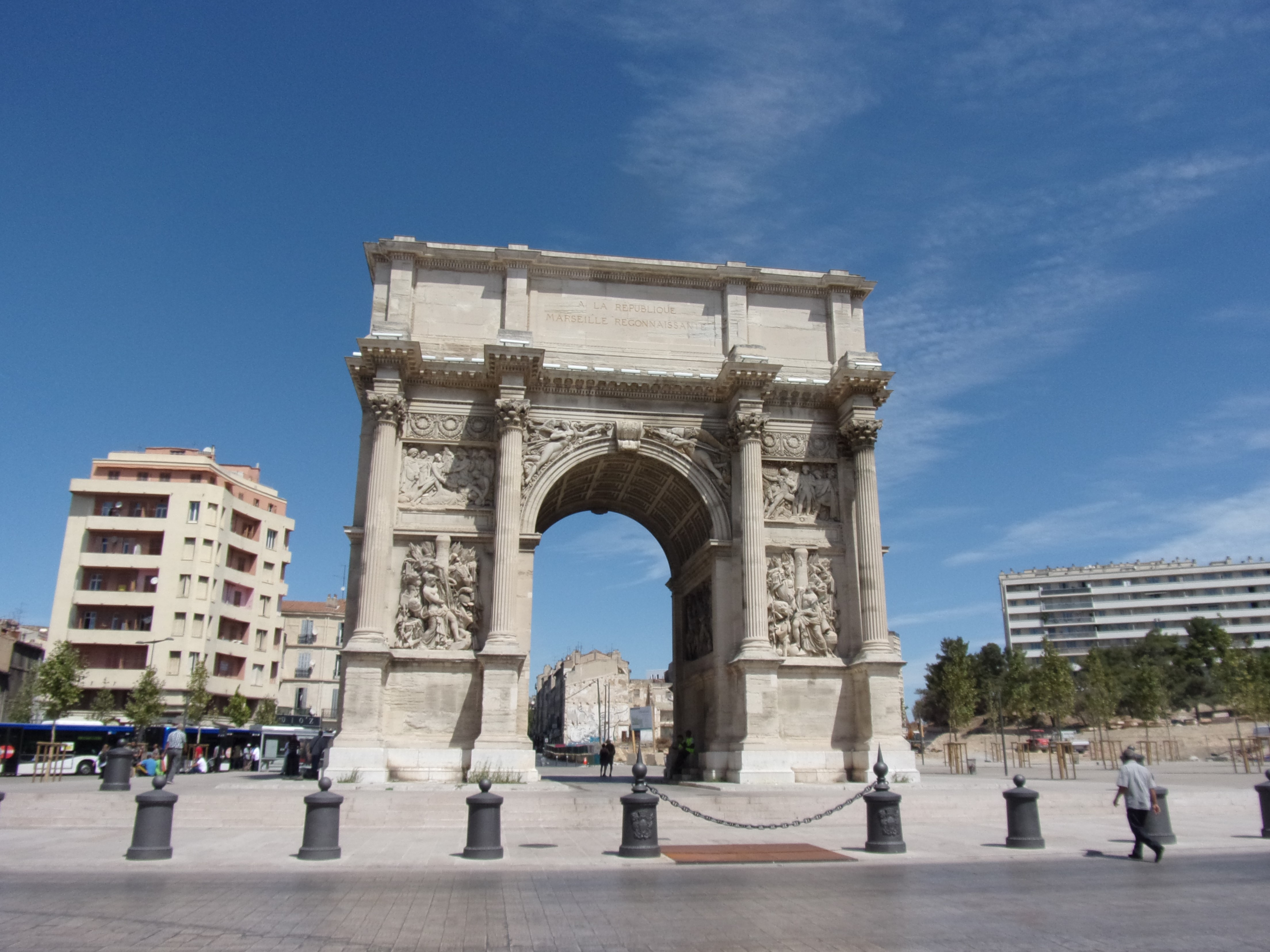

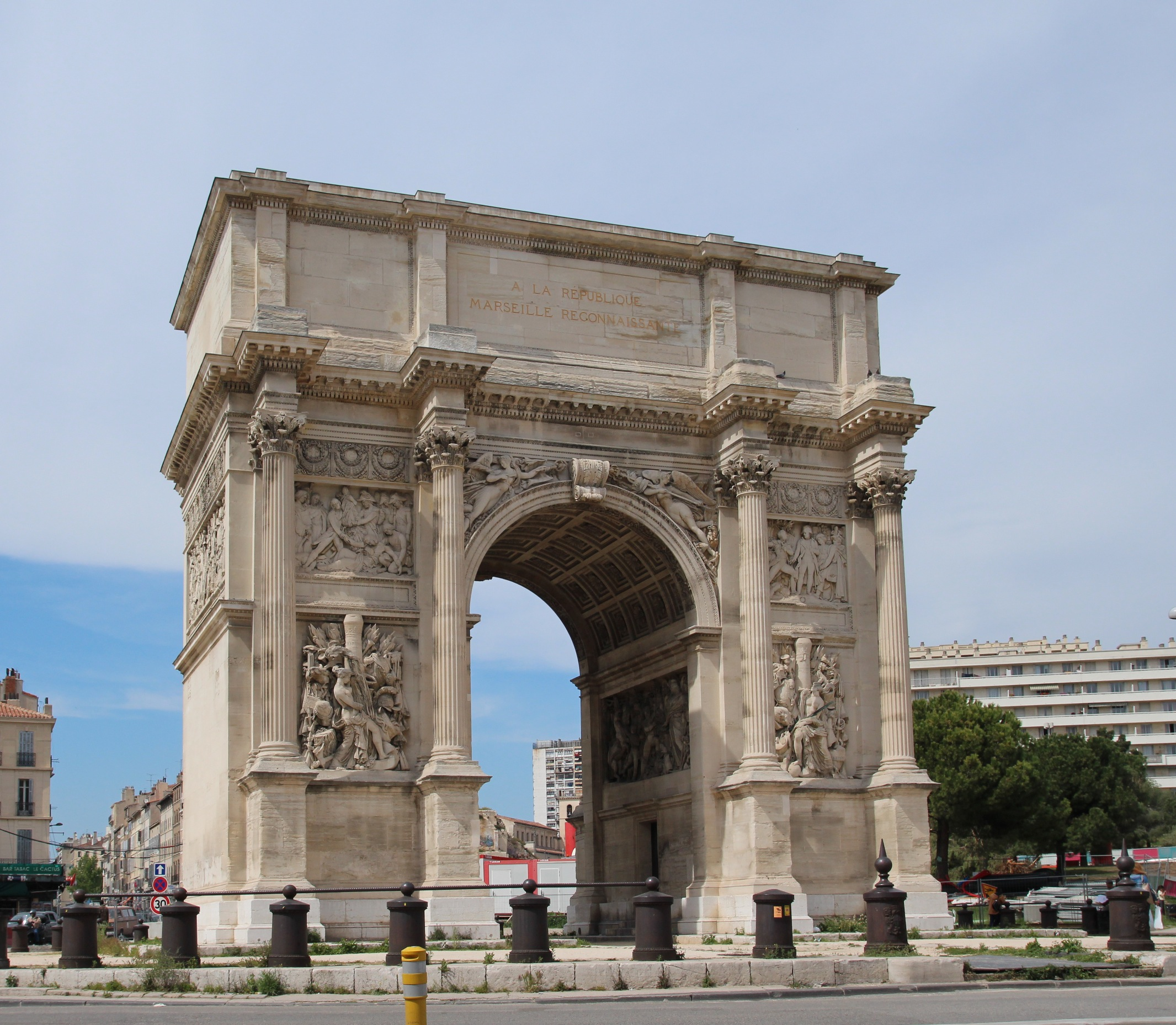

== Bibliography ==
- De la porte royale à la porte d'Aix : Projets successifs de l'Arc de Triomphe à la Porte d'Aix, à Marseille (du XVIe au XIXe siècle), Musée d'Histoire de Marseille, 1989, 55 pages, ISBN 2-907437-01-1
