= Pascal Coste =

French architect (1787–1879)

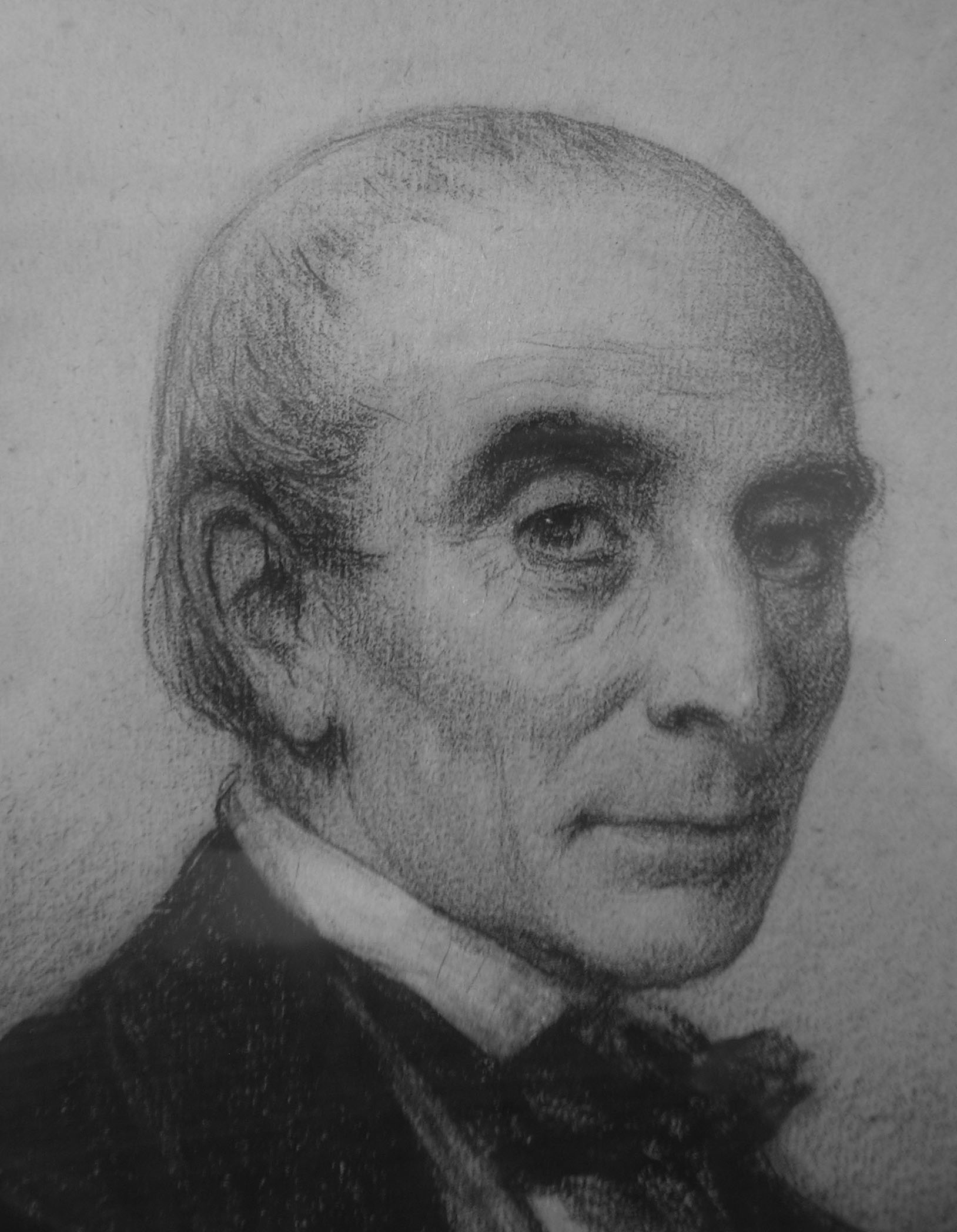
- Charcoal portrait (1859)
- Born: Xavier Pascal Coste; 26 November 1787; Marseille, Kingdom of France
- Died: 8 February 1879 (aged 91); Marseille, French Third Republic
- Resting place: Cimetière Saint-Pierre, Marseille; 43°17′28″N 5°24′45″E

Xavier Pascal Coste (26 November 1787 – 8 February 1879) was a French architect. He was at one time a personal architect for Muhammad Ali Pasha. As a seasoned traveller, his travels to Qajar Iran, aroused the interest of King Louis Philippe I and that gained Coste the post of chief architect of Marseille in 1844.

== Life ==
Coste was born in Marseille, where his father was one of the leading joiners. Showing intellectual and artistic promise, Coste began his studies in the studio of Michel-Robert Penchaud, architect of the département and the municipalité. In 1814, he was accepted into the École des Beaux-Arts in Paris. His time in Paris was a pivotal one in his life—there he met the geographer Edme-François Jomard, who put him in touch with the viceroy of Egypt, Muhammad Ali Pasha, who took Coste as his personal architect in 1817.

In 1825, Coste returned to France with an impressive series of drawings of the architecture of Cairo, but he soon went to Egypt once again at Ali's request, where Ali made him chief engineer for Lower Egypt. Coste remained there for four years, during which time he accumulated many sketches, but he reportedly found the Egyptian climate difficult and returned to France in 1829. He became a professor of architecture at the École des Beaux-Arts in Paris, due in part to the links he had kept with Penchaud. He remained in this post until 1861, when he was one of the founding members of the intellectual centre known as the Athénée.

In parallel with these activities, he travelled around France and to Germany, Belgium and Tunisia, where he produced several authoritative works on architecture; his architecture arabe (1827) earned him a place on the French king's embassy to the Iranian Shah. In Iran, Coste and the painter Eugène Flandin were authorized to visit Iranian Azerbaijan, Isfahan, Shiraz and the ruins of Ecbatana, Bistun, Taq-e Bostan, Kangavar, Pasargadae and Persepolis, where he made many sketches. On his return via Baghdad, he saw the ruins of Seleucia, Ctesiphon and Babylon. He continued via Nineveh, to which the archaeologist Paul-Émile Botta was also travelling to begin his excavations.

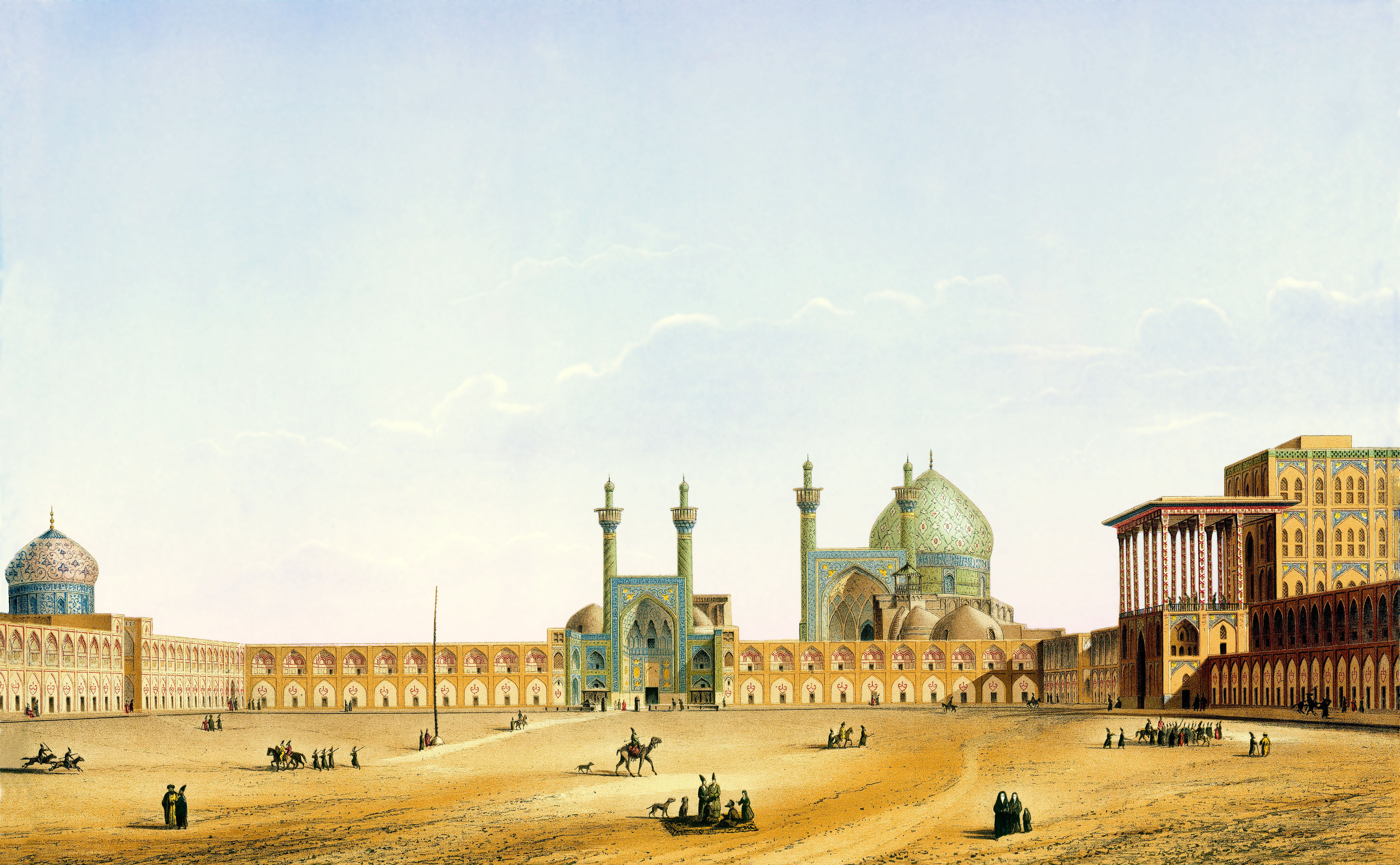
Pascal Coste's depiction of Naqsh-e Jahan Square, Isfahan

His Middle East journey aroused the interest of Louis Philippe I and gained Coste the post of chief architect of Marseille in 1844. In 1846, the president of the Chambre de Commerce, M. Luce, commissioned from Coste the Bourse on Marseille's Canebière. Coste was also the originator of two other architectural projects in Marseille—the construction of the faculté aux allées de Meilhan, and a museum with château d'eau at Longchamps. He also began construction on the abattoir d'Arenc, only completed in 1851.

A tireless traveller, even aged over 80, he visited Spain, Ireland, Germany, Austria, Hungary, Russia and Italy. He left 30 albums of drawings on his death, now held at the Bibliothèque de Marseille, though some of his essays were never published. Towards the end of his life, he was made an officer of the Légion d'honneur. He died aged 92 and was buried at the cimetière Saint-Pierre in Marseille.

== Buildings ==
- Église Saint-Lazare, Marseille, 1833
- Église Saint-Joseph, Marseille, 1833
- Église de Saint-Barnabé, Marseille, 1846
- Église de Mazargues, Marseille, 1851
- Palais de la Bourse (Marseille)
- Pavillons of the cours Saint-Louis in Marseille

== Works ==
=== Published ===
- Map of Lower Egypt, dedicated to Muhammad Ali, P. C., laid down routes and surveys, 1818–1827, slnd v. 1830, 4to.
- Note on a dolmen that exists in Draguignan , with Audiffret, edited by Barlatier - Feissat and Demonchy, sd, 8vo.
- Arabic Architecture and monuments of Cairo, measured and drawn from 1818 to 1826, edited by Firmin Didot, 1837 g . in- °F, 70 flat.
- Travel in Persia, with Flandin, edited by Gide and Baudry, 1851, 2 vols. 8vo, and 6-in- f ° of All which five of plates and 1 of notes.
- Modern Monuments of Persia measured, drawn and described, edited by Morel, 1867 g . in- f °, 71 pl. notes and neck.
- The Cathedral of Saint Petersburg. Future Marseille Cathedral, edited by Olive, 1874, br, 8vo.
- Palais de la Bourse, Marseille, edited by Olive, 1874, br, 8vo.
- Memory of an artist, edited by Olive, 1874, br, 8vo.
- Notes and souvenirs (1817–1877), edited by Cayer, 1878, 2 vols. 8vo, portr.

=== Unpublished ===
- Itinerary of the French Embassy in Persia under the Comte de Sercey, and scientific trips of two artists committed to this mission (two volumes of text with images and 9 atlases of plates)
- Monuments of Europe ... drawings ... together ... from 1832 to 1872. 11 flight. with 1187 pieces, for Britain, the Scandinavian countries, the Russian empires, German, Austro-Hungarian, Switzerland, Berlgique, Holland, Spain and Italy.
- Monuments of France ... 1828–1876 ... , one volume with 1491 flat.
- Monuments of North Africa (inc in Egypt, the Barbary States, Spain) , 8 volumes with 1253 flat.
