= Joseph-Marius Ramus =

French sculptor

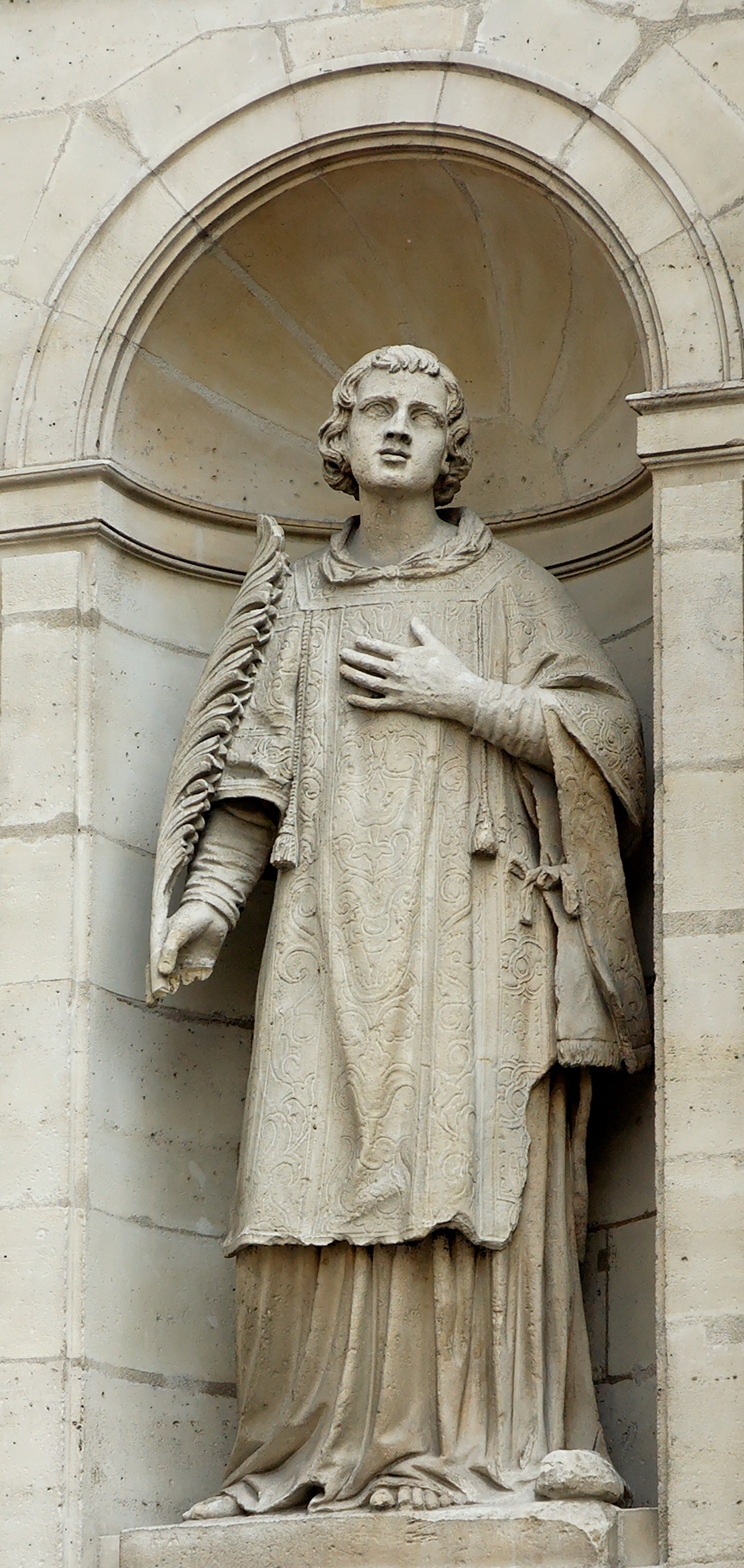
- Born: June 19 1805; Aix-en-Provence, Bouches-du-Rhône, France
- Died: 1888 (aged 82–83); Nogent-sur-Seine, France

Joseph-Marius Ramus (1805-1888) was a French sculptor.

== Biography ==
He was born on June 19, 1805, in Aix-en-Provence, Bouches-du-Rhône, France. He was taught by Jean-Pierre Cortot (1787–1843).

According to Ambroise Roux-Alphéran, Louis Nicolas Philippe Auguste de Forbin once said that in the same way as Marseille had Pierre Paul Puget, Ramus could become Aix's best sculptor.

Some of his sculptures can be found in the Musée Granet in Aix-en-Provence. Moreover, the Palace of Justice of Aix-en-Provence is flanked by two of his sculptures. More of his sculptures can be found in Digne (Statue de Gassendi), Marseille (Statue de Pierre Puget in Parc Borély) and Paris (Buste de Tourville in Musée national de la Marine).

He died in 1888 in Nogent-sur-Seine.

== Legacy ==
The Place Ramus in Aix-en-Provence is named in his honor.
