= Cours Saint-Louis =

Street in Marseille, France

Coordinates: 43°17′46″N 5°22′41″E

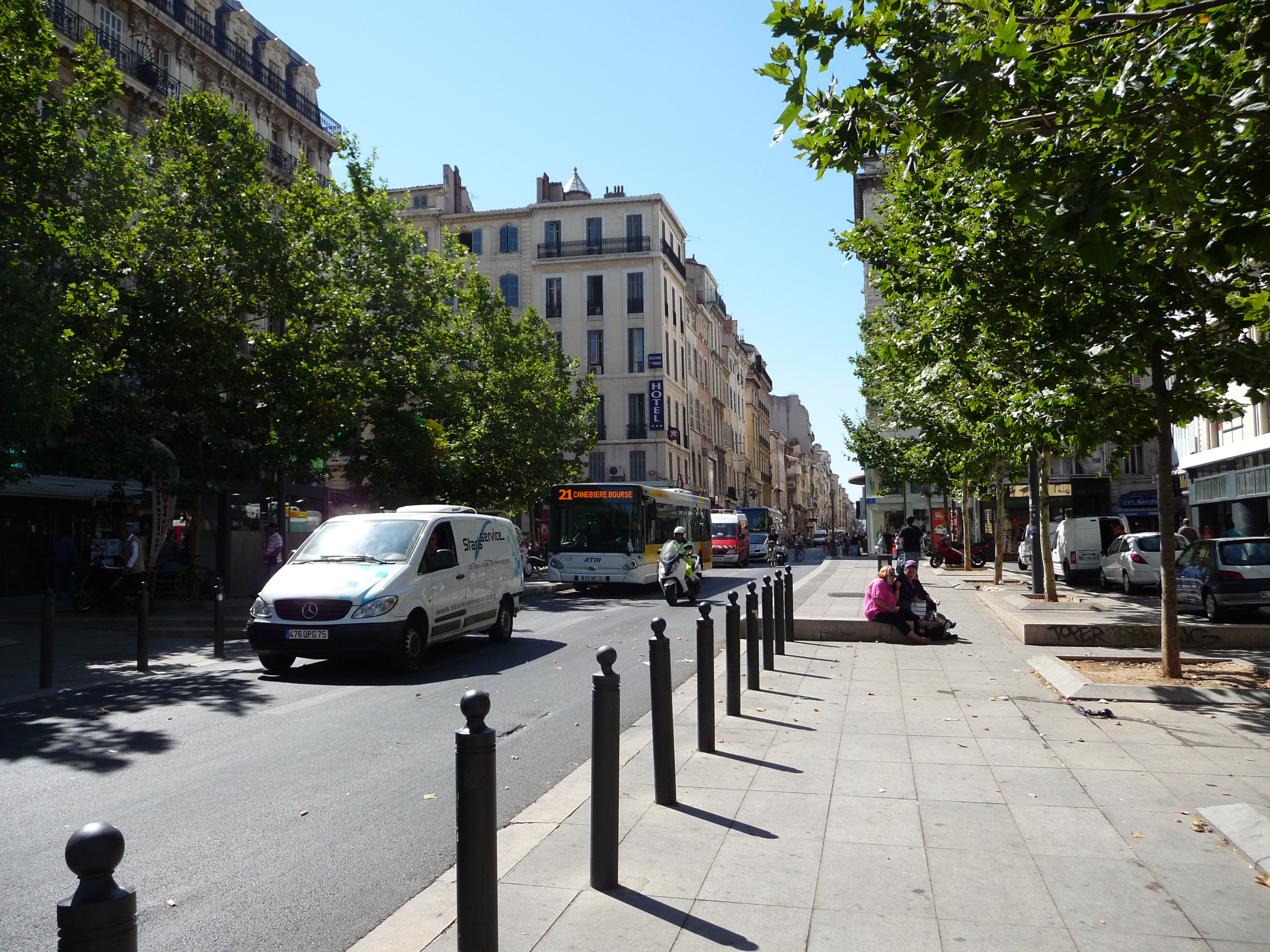
Cours Saint-Louis (2011)

The Cours Saint-Louis is a street in Marseille, named after Louis of Toulouse (elder brother of Robert of Naples) rather than Saint Louis. It is the location of small pavilions to designs by Pascal Coste from which flowers are sold.

It is located just off a crossroads, with the route to the Place Castellane (via the Rue de Rome) leading off from one side, the route to the Porte d'Aix and its triumphal arch, completed in 1839 (the route also passes near the library Bibliothèque de L'Alcazar) leading off from the opposite side, two routes leading towards the Old Port (one of which being the famous La Canebière built in 1666 by King Louis XIV), a route towards Palais Longchamp (with a simple right turn onto the Canebèire).

With its close proximity to the famous daily vegetable marketplace of Noailles and also with an opening at the back, which meets up with the beginning of the Rue d'Aubagne (which leads up to Notre Dame-du-Mont), the Cours Saint-Louis forms a kind of unofficial central point both geographically and culturally of Marseille town centre.

Apart from being itself a historic place, it also features a few notable institutions such as La Chapellerie de Marseille (a famous hat shop), Toinou Coquillages (a sea food and shellfish restaurant established in 1956), as well as La Pharmacie du Père Blaize (a herbal chemist shop established in 1815), being just a few steps away in nearby Rue Méolan.

The Cours Saint-Louis is now easily accessible by a new section Tramway which runs directly through it.
