= Barthélémy-François Chardigny =

French sculptor

- Born: September 4, 1757; Rouen, France
- Died: March 3, 1813 (aged 55); Paris, France
- Occupation: Sculptor
- Children: Pierre Joseph Chardigny

Barthélémy-François Chardigny (1757–1813) was a French sculptor. He designed public sculptures in Marseille.

== Early life ==
Barthélémy-François Chardigny was born on September 4, 1757, in Rouen, France. He learned sculpture under Augustin Pajou.

== Career ==
Chardigny was a sculptor. He won the Prix de Rome in sculpture in 1782.

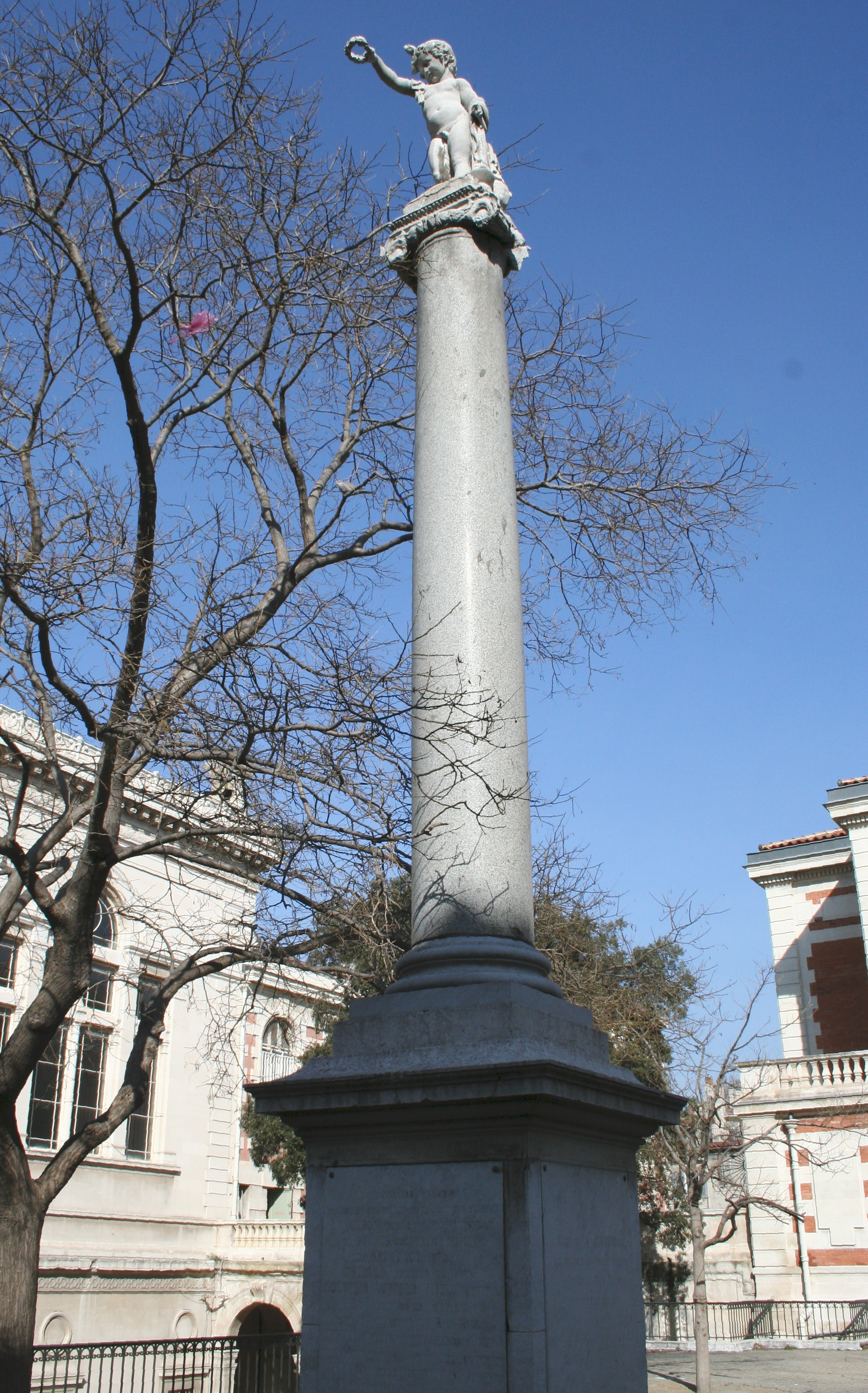
Statue in honor of the victims of the 1720 plague epidemic, designed by Chardigny, Marseille.

Chardigny moved to Aix-en-Provence to design sculptures for the Palace of Justice in 1784. He designed marble sculptures of King René and King Henry IV, a sculpture of the Greek mythology figure Venus, two fountains, a large sculpture with three figures, and another sculpture named Despotisme renversé. However, they were removed during the French Revolution, and moved to the Ecole Centrale (then in Aix and later moved to Marseille) in 1802.

Chardigny moved to Marseille, where he was commissioned a statue representing Liberty for the townhall in 1798. He subsequently designed the same statue for many townhalls. Meanwhile, he was commissioned other public sculptures by the city of Marseille. For example, he designed the fountain on the Place des Capucines, then known as the place des fainéants; it was later dismantled and replaced with another fountain designed by Dominique Fossati, although the basin remains Chardigny's. Meanwhile, Chardigny became a member of the Académie de Marseille in 1800.

Chardigny moved to Paris in 1808, where he designed sculptures of Juno and Jupiter in the Louvre Palace.

== Personal life, death and legacy ==
Chardigny married and had a son, Pierre Joseph Chardigny, in 1794. He died on March 3, 1813, in Paris. Eight of his sculptures are in the permanent collection of the Musée des beaux-arts de Marseille, while more sculptures are held at the Musée Granet in Aix-en-Provence.
