= Église Saint-Joseph (Marseille) =

Coordinates: 43.2880°N 5.3785°E

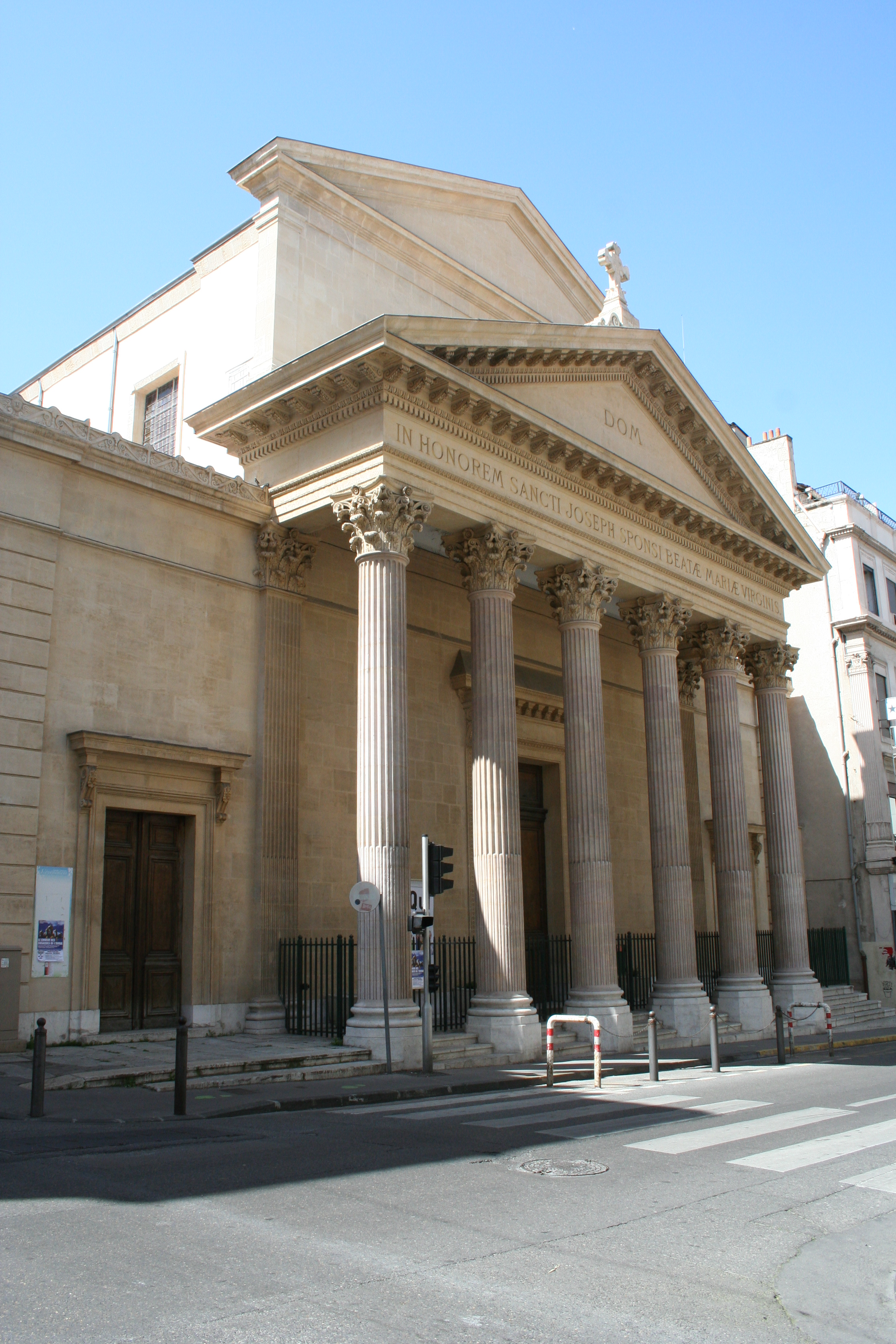
- Facade of the Église Saint-Joseph
- Église Saint-Joseph
- Location: 126 rue Paradis; Marseille 13006; Bouches-du-Rhône, Provence-Alpes-Côte d'Azur
- Country: France
- Denomination: Roman Catholic

Architecture
- Heritage designation: Monument historique
- Architect: Pascal Coste

Administration
- Diocese: Roman Catholic Archdiocese of Marseille

Clergy
- Vicar: Fr Michel Roux

The Église Saint-Joseph is a Roman Catholic church in Marseille.

== Location ==
It is located in the 6th arrondissement of Marseille. The exact address is at 124-126 rue Paradis.

== History ==
The church, alongside Église Saint-Charles in the 1st arrondissement of Marseille, was constructed as a result of the rapid expansion of Marseille and the creation of new neighbourhoods in the nineteenth century. On August 14, 1831, it was authorized by Fortuné de Mazenod (1749-1840), who served as the Bishop of Marseille from 1823 to 1837. During the construction, church-goers worshipped in the nearby Église Saint-Nicolas-de-Myre. Land was purchased from landowner Maxime Martin to build this new church.

The church building was designed by architect Pascal Coste (1787-1879) in 1833, in a similar manner as the nearby Église Saint-Lazare, also designed by Coste. Drawing upon his designs, architect Joseph Ferrié oversaw the construction of the facade. In 1868, Henri-Jacques Espérandieu (1829-1874) designed the casing of the pipe organ and the ceiling of the nave. The high altar and the baldachin were designed by Louis Sainte-Marie-Perrin (1835-1917). The pipe organ was made by Aristide Cavaillé-Coll (1811-1899). The entire church was only finalized as late as 1925. However, it was dedicated on April 25, 1855.

It has been listed as a Monument historique since February 9, 1999.

== At present ==
It is open every day except Sunday, from Monday to Saturday from 10AM to 12PM, and from 4PM to 6PM. The current vicar is Fr Michel Roux.

== Gallery ==
Église Saint-Joseph
Map of the church

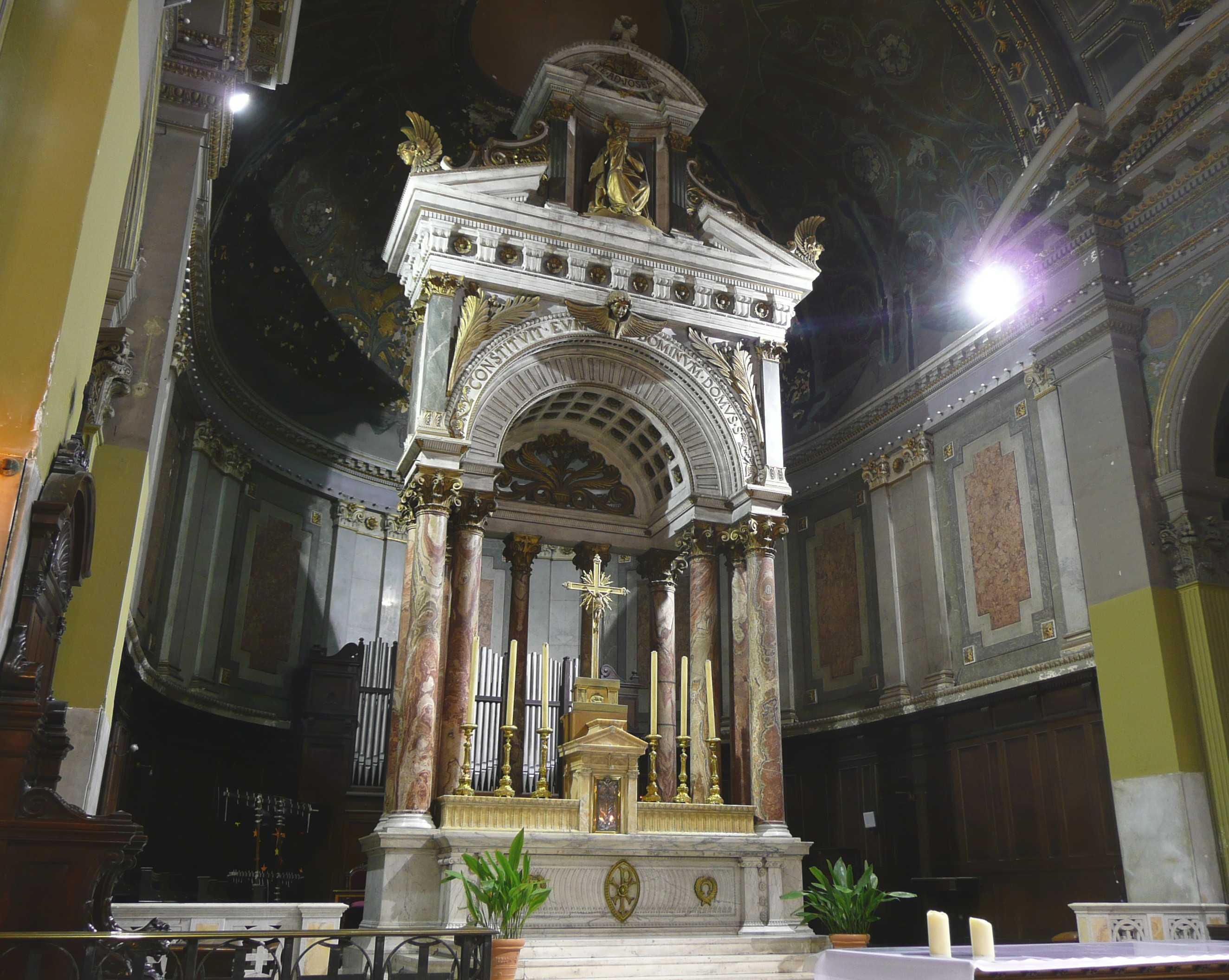
High altar inside the Église Saint-Joseph

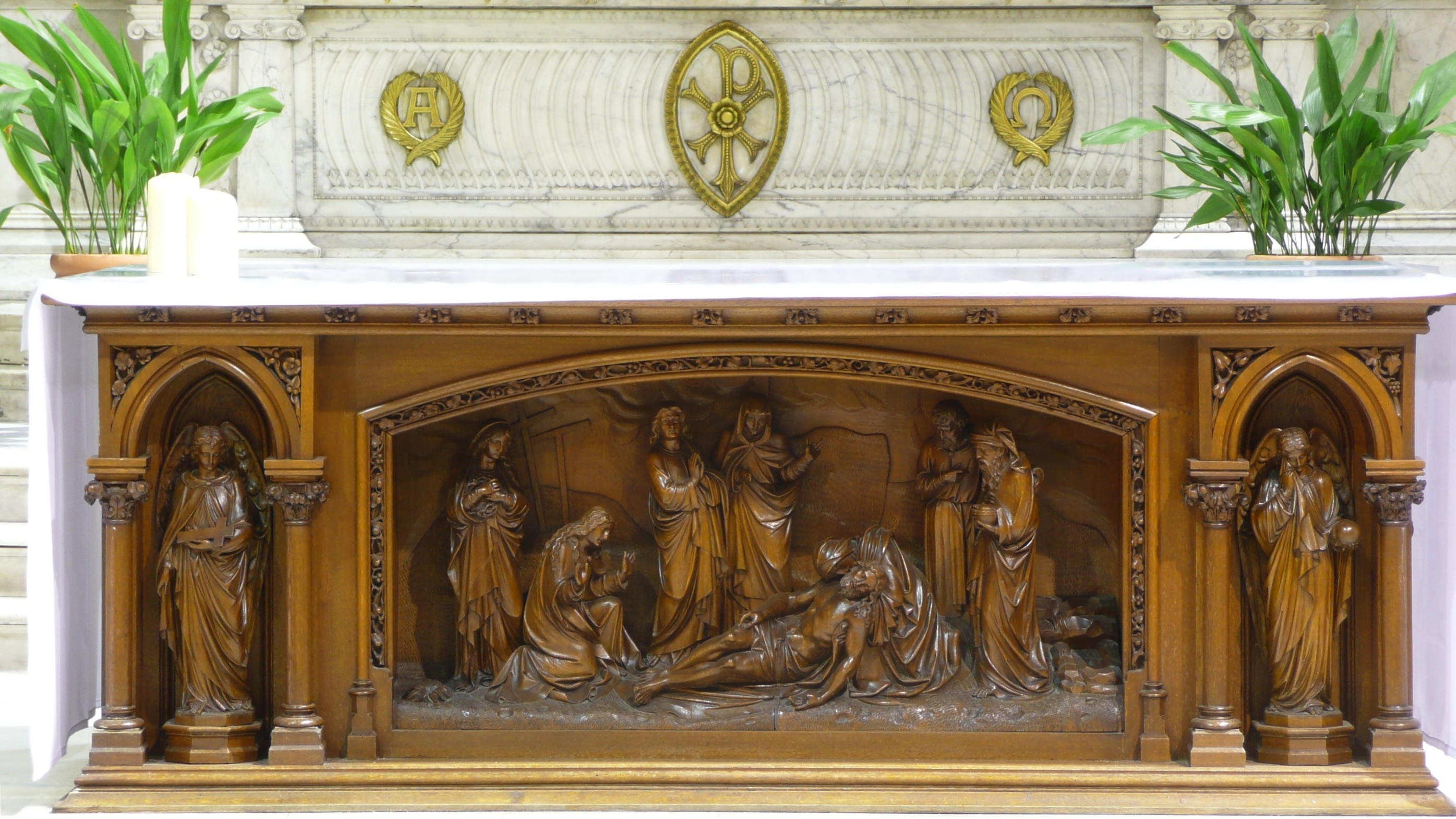
Sculpted wooden retable inside the Église Saint-Joseph

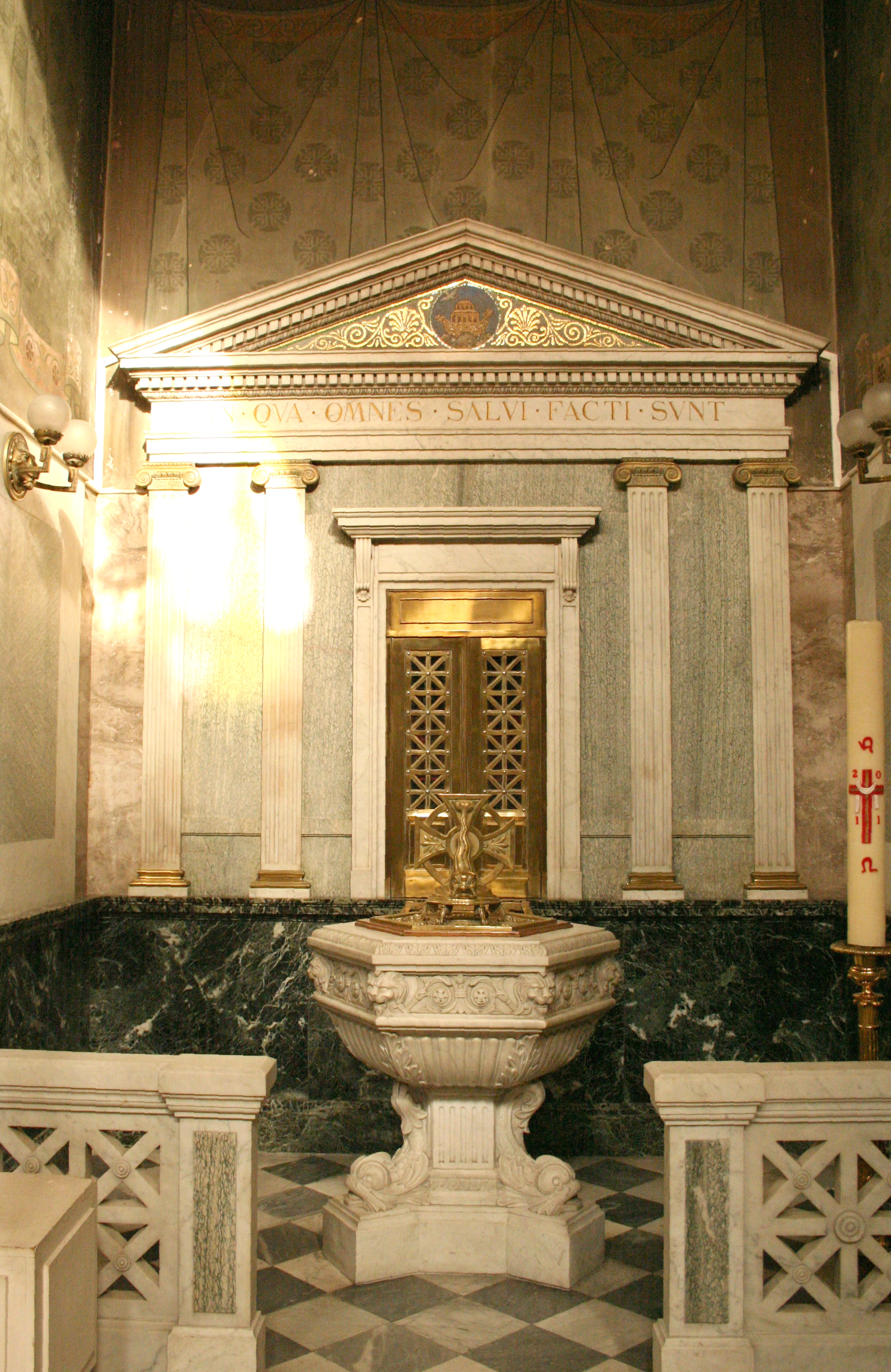
Baptismal font inside the Église Saint-Joseph

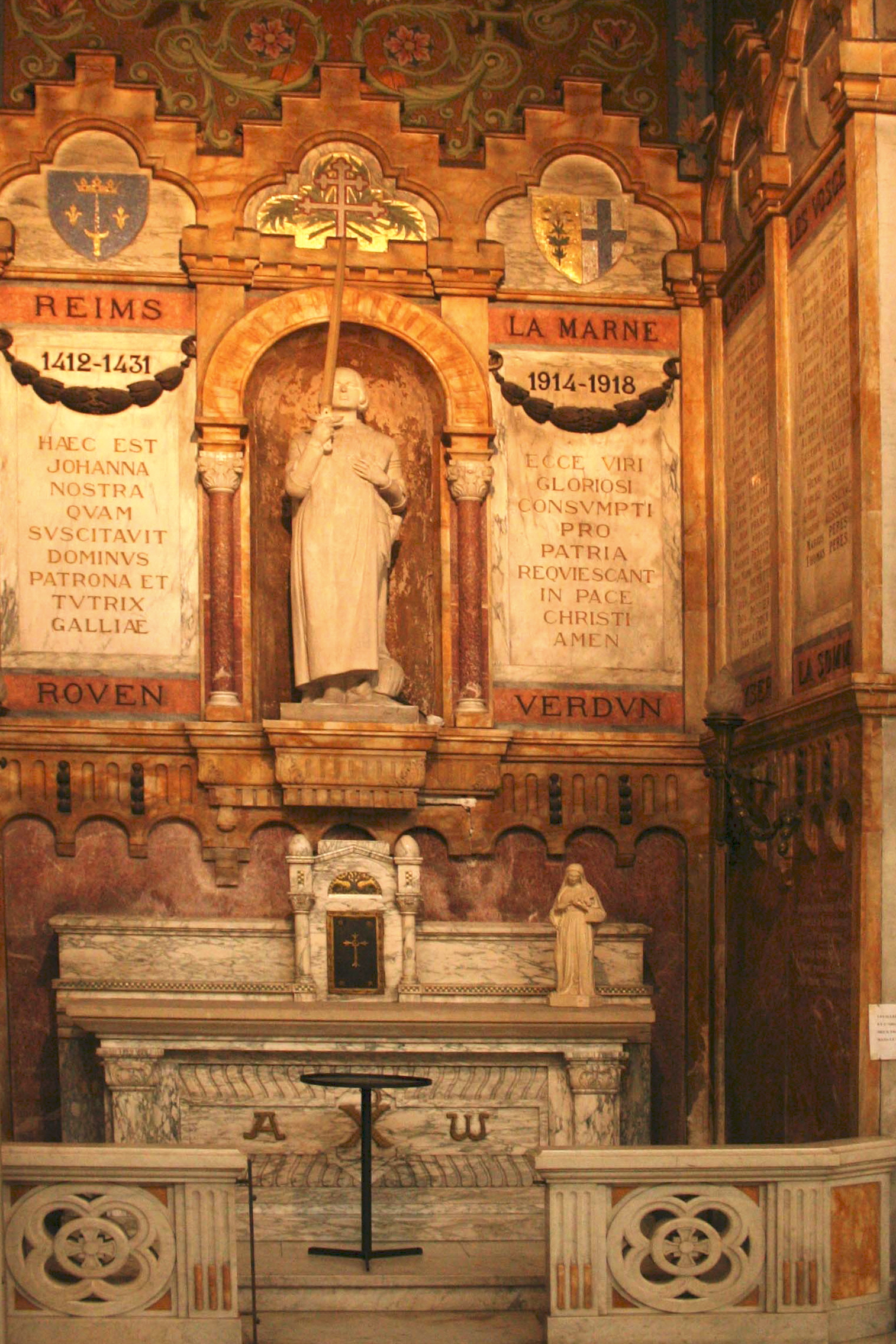
Side chapel in honour of Joan of Arc inside the Église Saint-Joseph

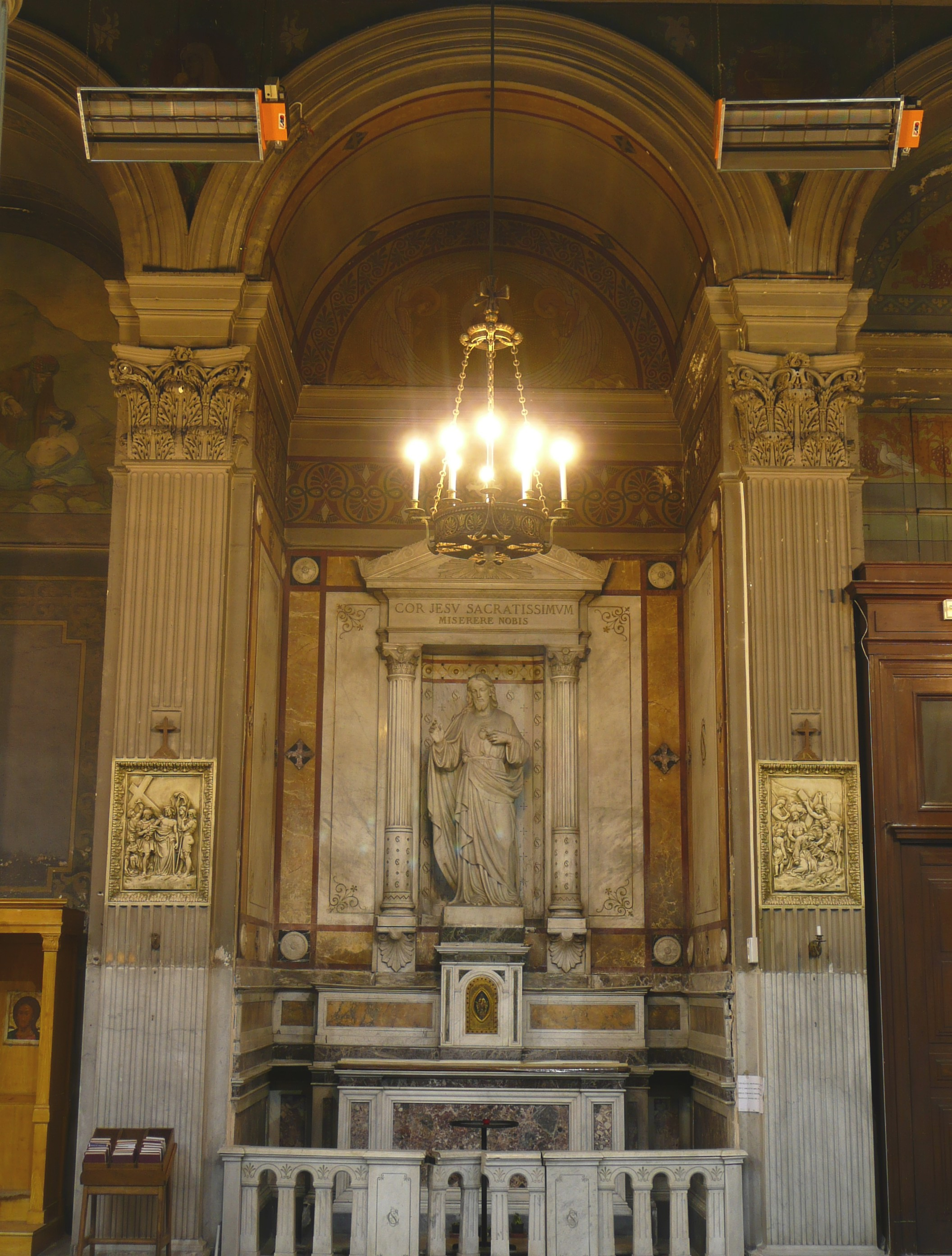
Side chapel in honour of the Sacred Heart inside the Église Saint-Joseph

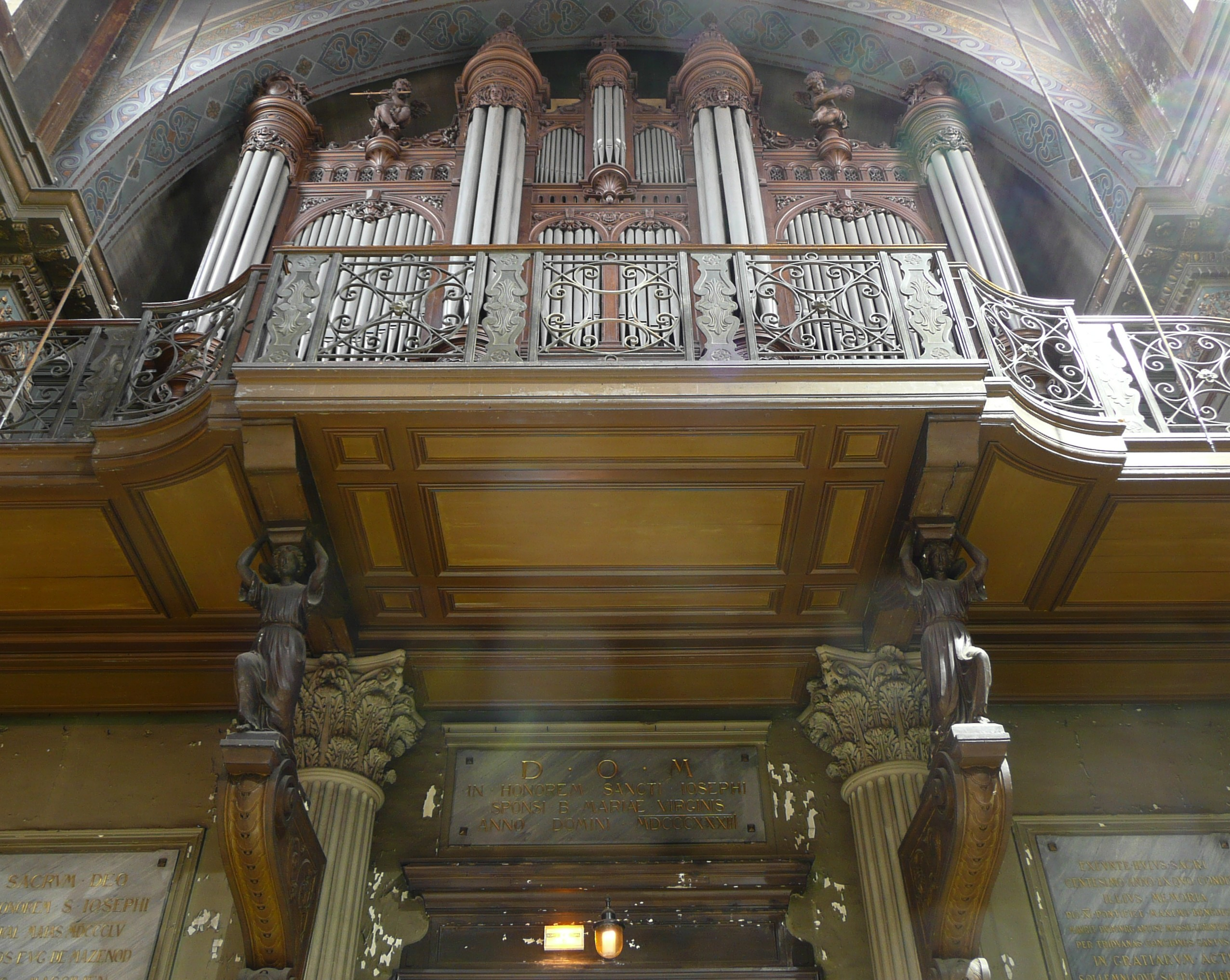
Pipe organ inside the Église Saint-Joseph

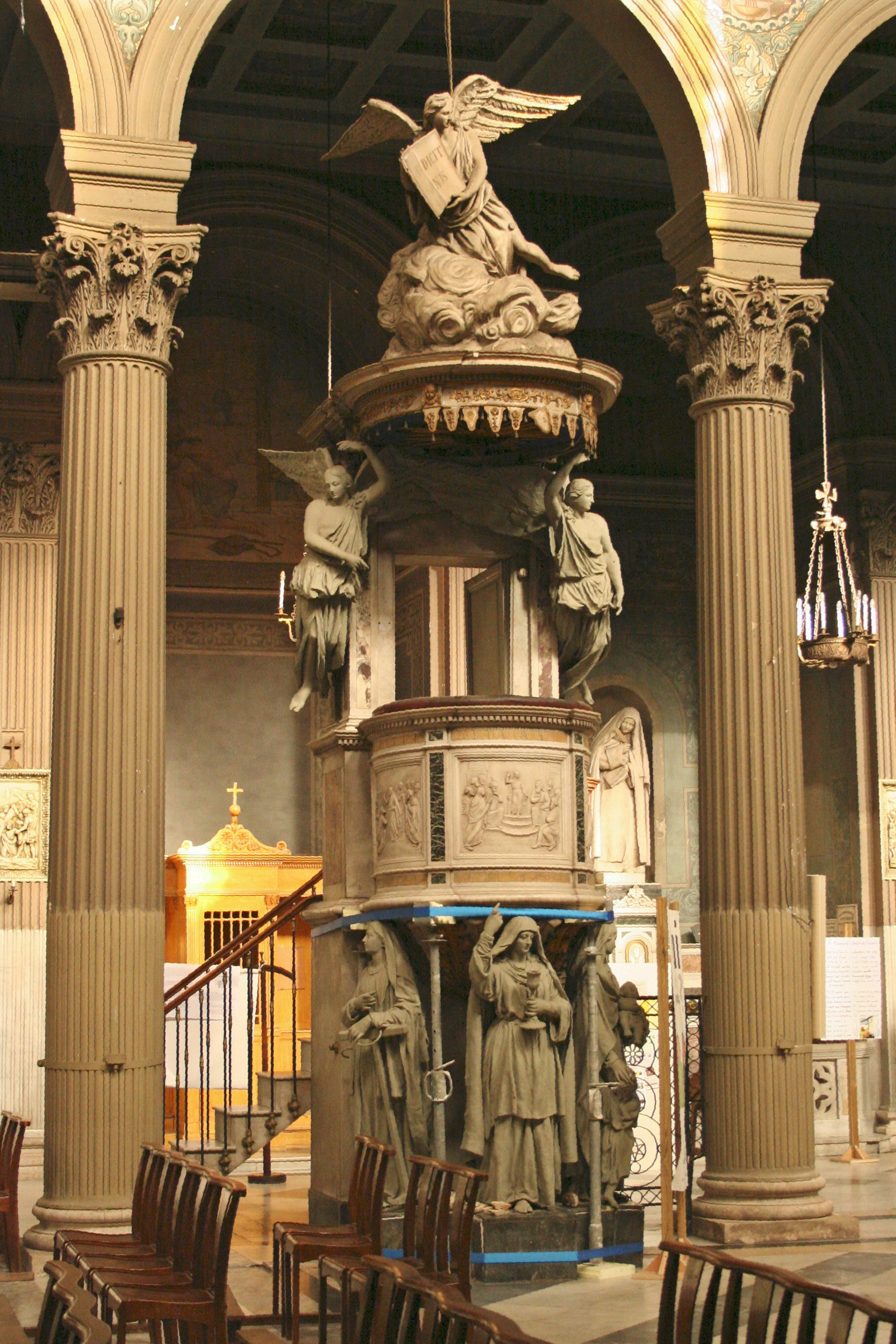
Pulpit inside the Église Saint-Joseph

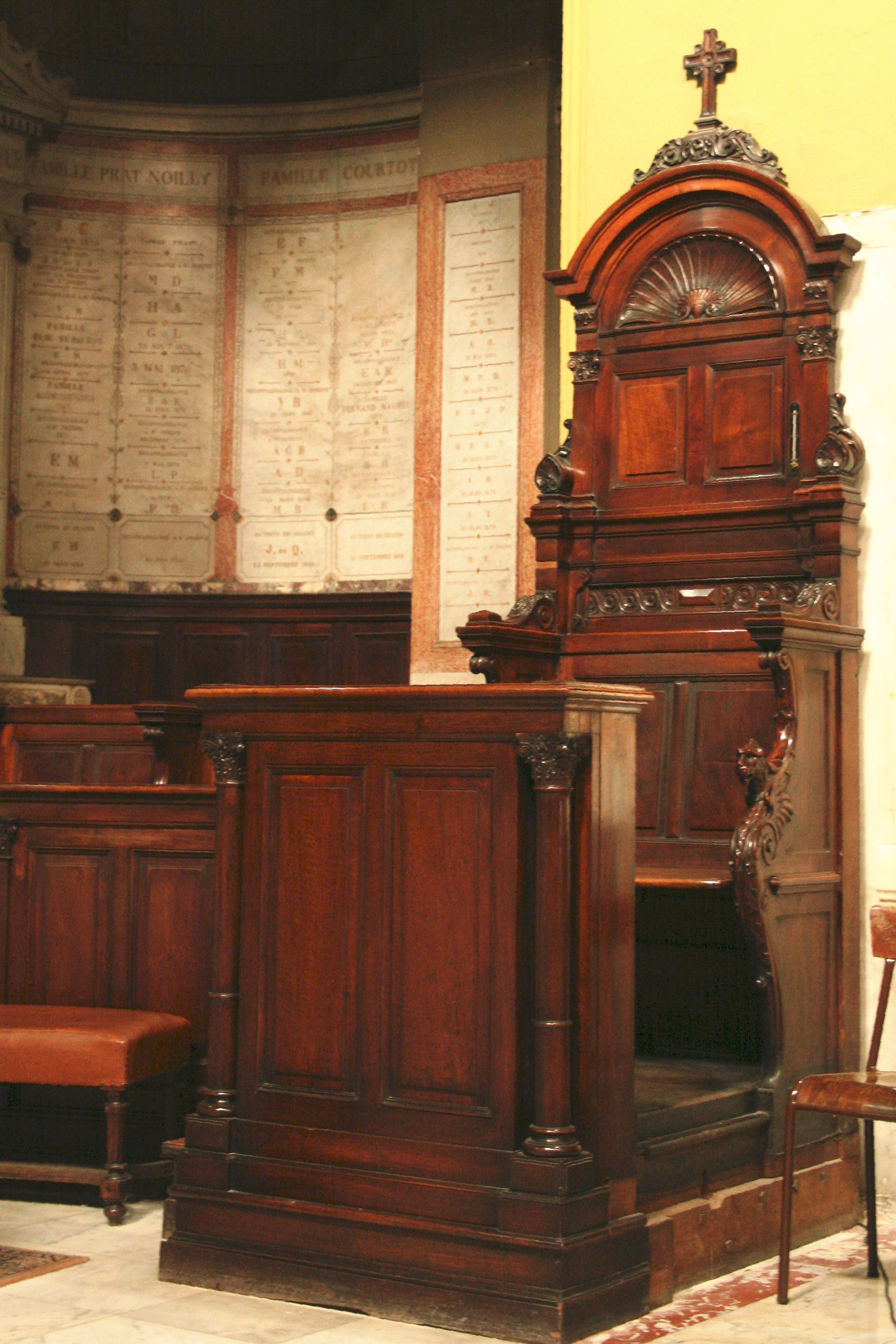
Choir stool inside the Église Saint-Joseph

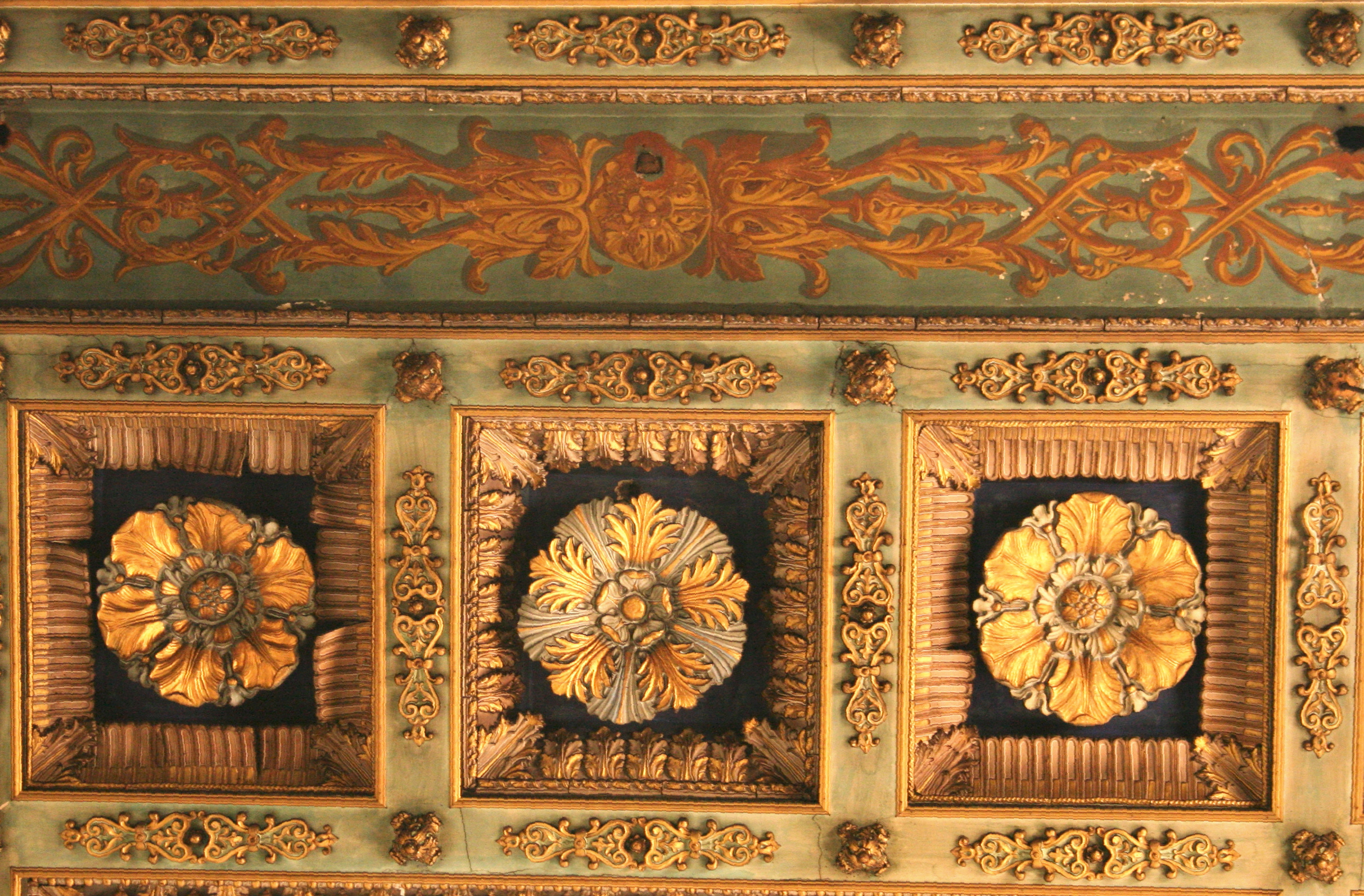
Close-up of a motif in the ceiling inside the Église Saint-Joseph

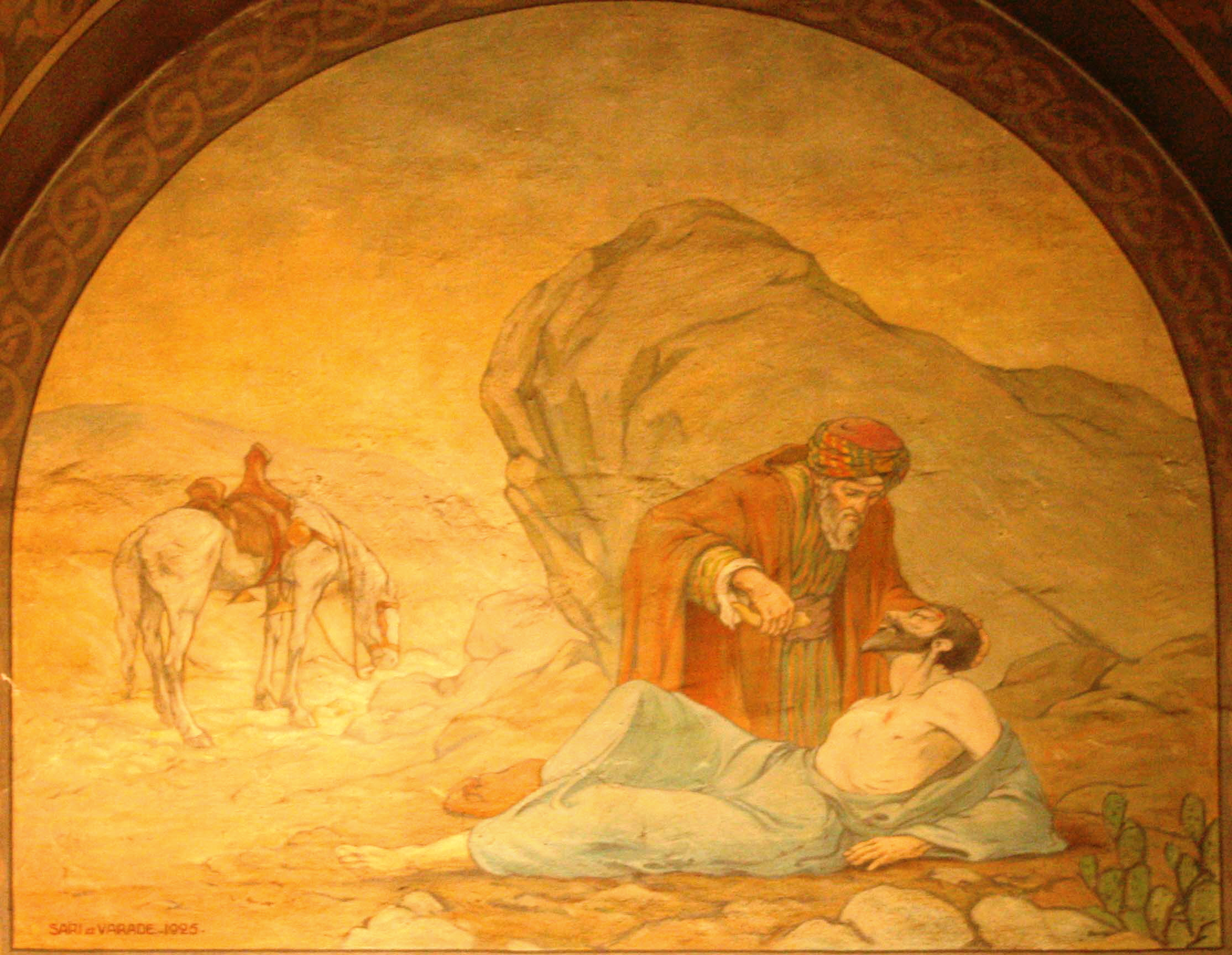
Fresco representing the Good Samaritan inside the Église Saint-Joseph

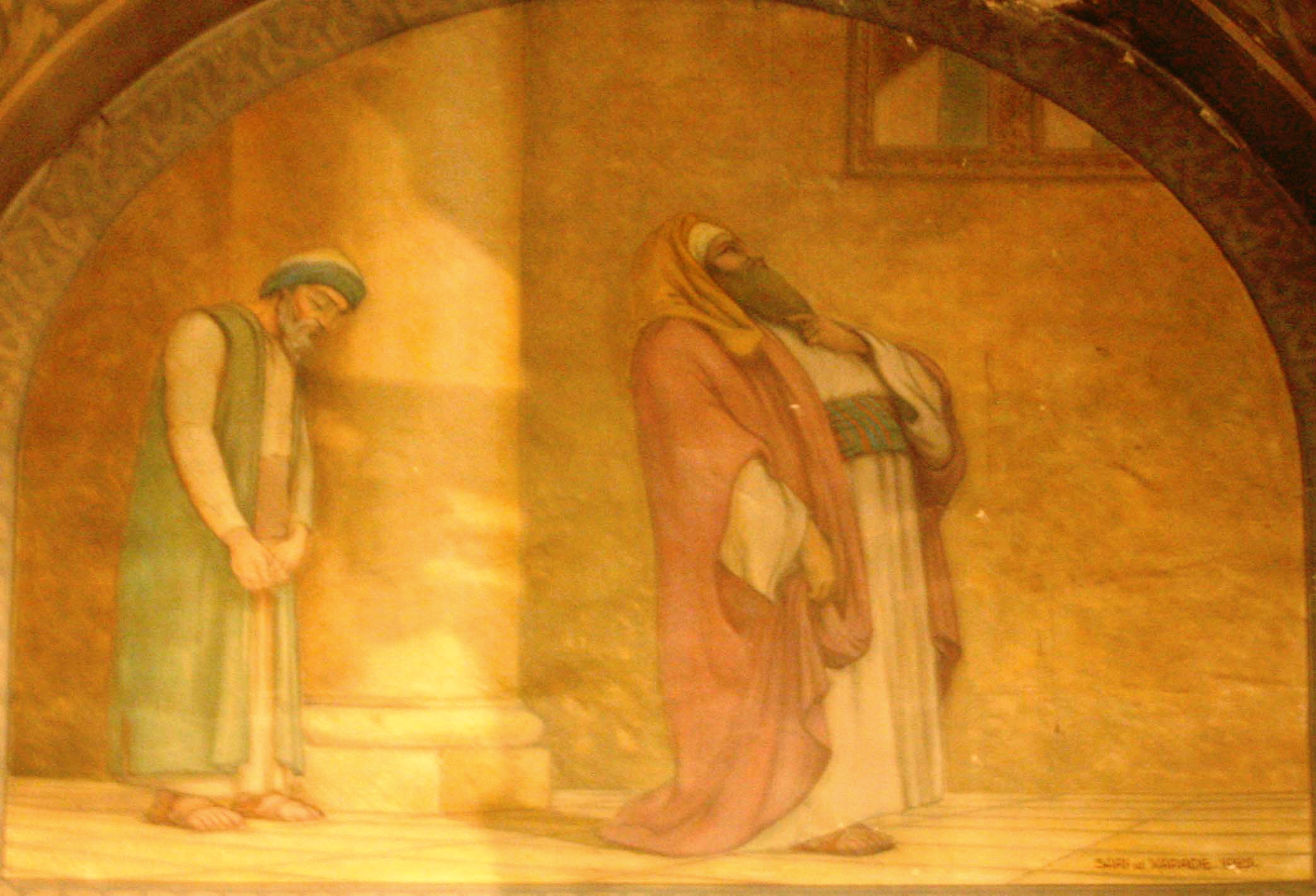
Fresco representing the Pharisee and the Publican painted by Charles Varade and Jean Sari inside the Église Saint-Joseph

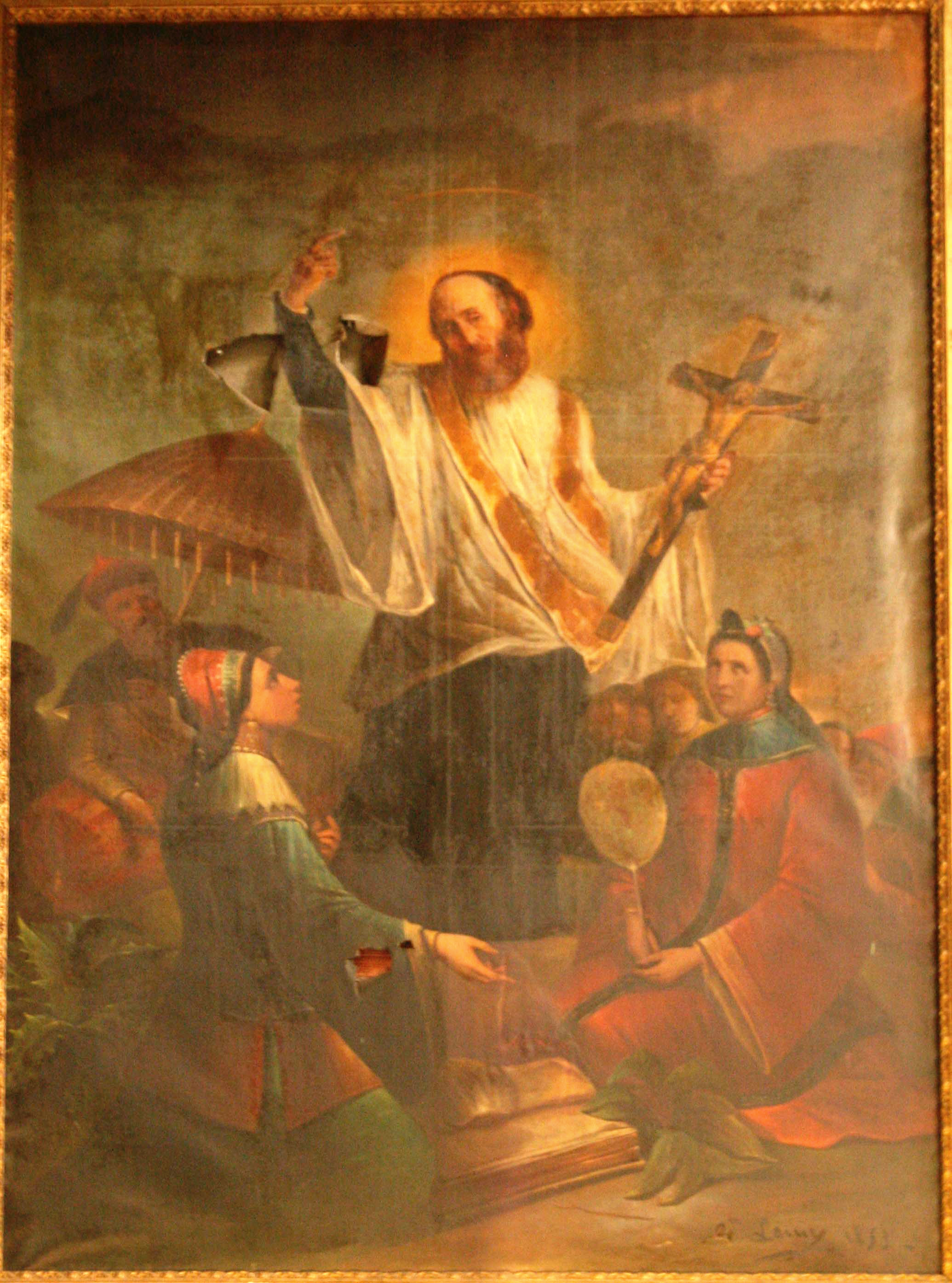
Painting representing Saint François Xavier inside the Église Saint-Joseph

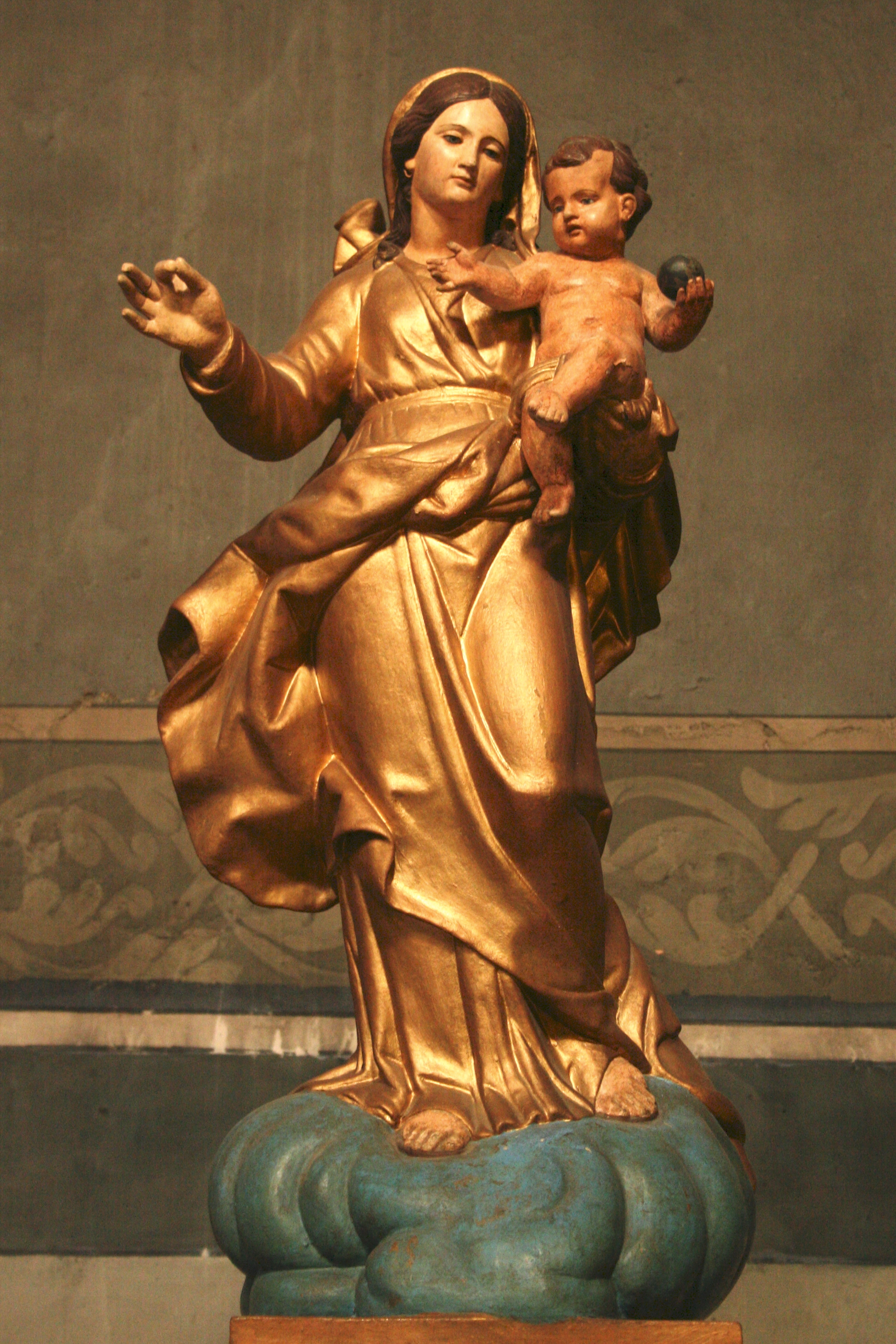
Statue representing the Virgin Mary with Baby Jesus inside the Église Saint-Joseph

== Secondary source ==
- T. Brieugne, Monographie de la Paroisse Saint Joseph de Marseille (Imprimerie Marseillaise, 1933).
