= Palace of Justice of Aix-en-Provence =

Palace in France

Coordinates: 43.5285°N 5.4504°E

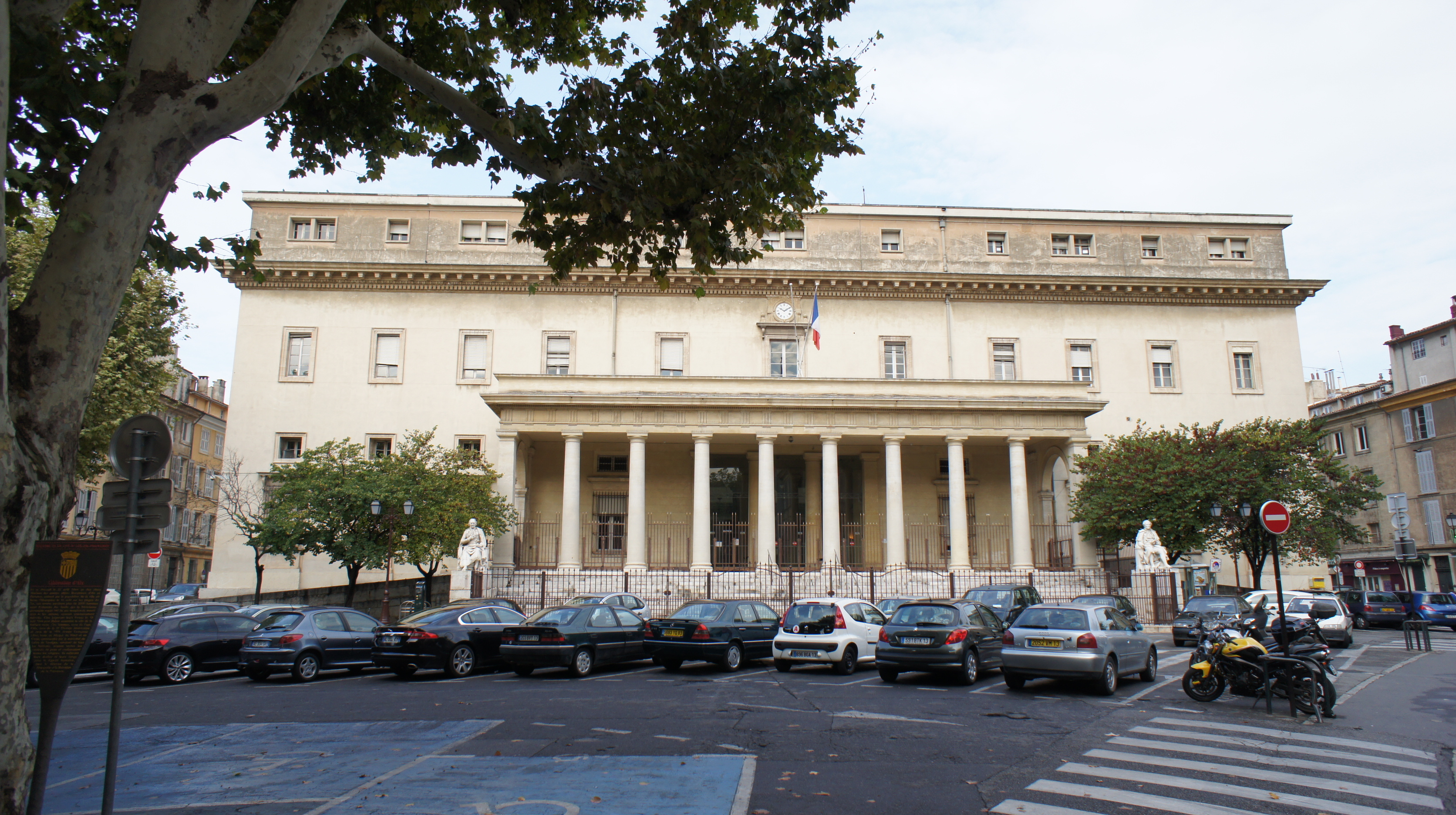
- Interactive map of the Palace of Justice of Aix-en-Provence area

General information
- Architectural style: Neoclassical
- Location: Place de Verdun, Aix-en-Provence, France
- Construction started: 1787
- Completed: 1831
- Inaugurated: 1832

Design and construction
- Architects: Claude-Nicolas Ledoux; Michel Penchaud

The Palace of Justice of Aix-en-Provence (French: "Palais de justice d'Aix-en-Provence") is a listed historical building in Aix-en-Provence, Bouches-du-Rhône, France.

== Location ==
The Palace of Justice is located on the Place de Verdun in the centre of Aix-en-Provence.

== History ==
Architect Claude-Nicolas Ledoux was commissioned to build or rebuild The palace in 1787. Two hundred houses were demolished to make space for the new construction. However, construction was discontinued because of the French Revolution of 1789. It resumed in 1822, when architect Michel Penchaud took over. The building was finally completed in 1831.

The building is flanked by two sculptures Joseph-Marius Ramus: on the left, Jean-Étienne-Marie Portalis; on the right, Joseph Jérôme, Comte Siméon.

== Heritage significance ==
It has been listed as a monument historique since 1979.

== Gallery ==
Palace of Justice of Aix-en-Provence
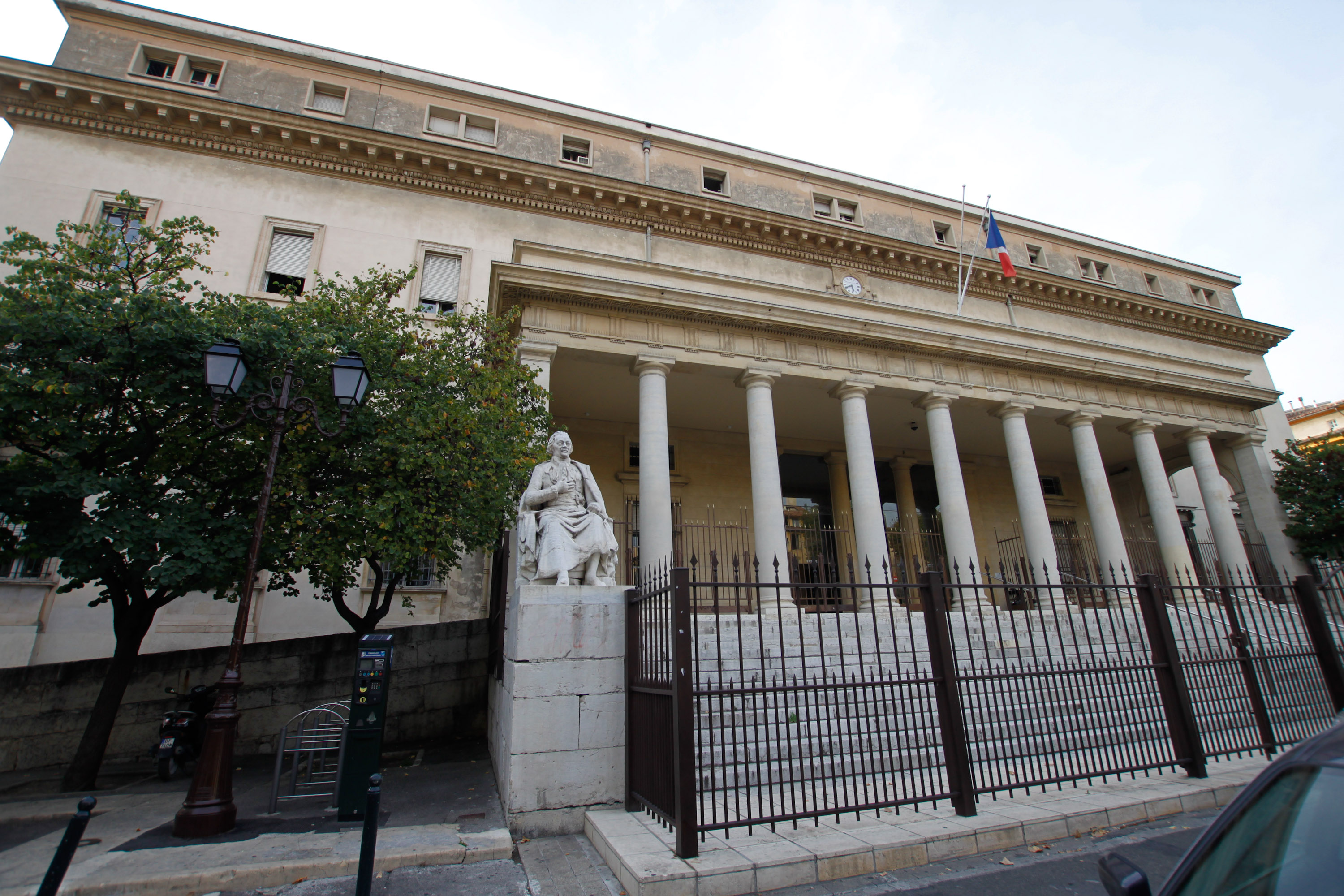
Palace of Justice with sculpture of Jean-Étienne-Marie Portalis on the left side

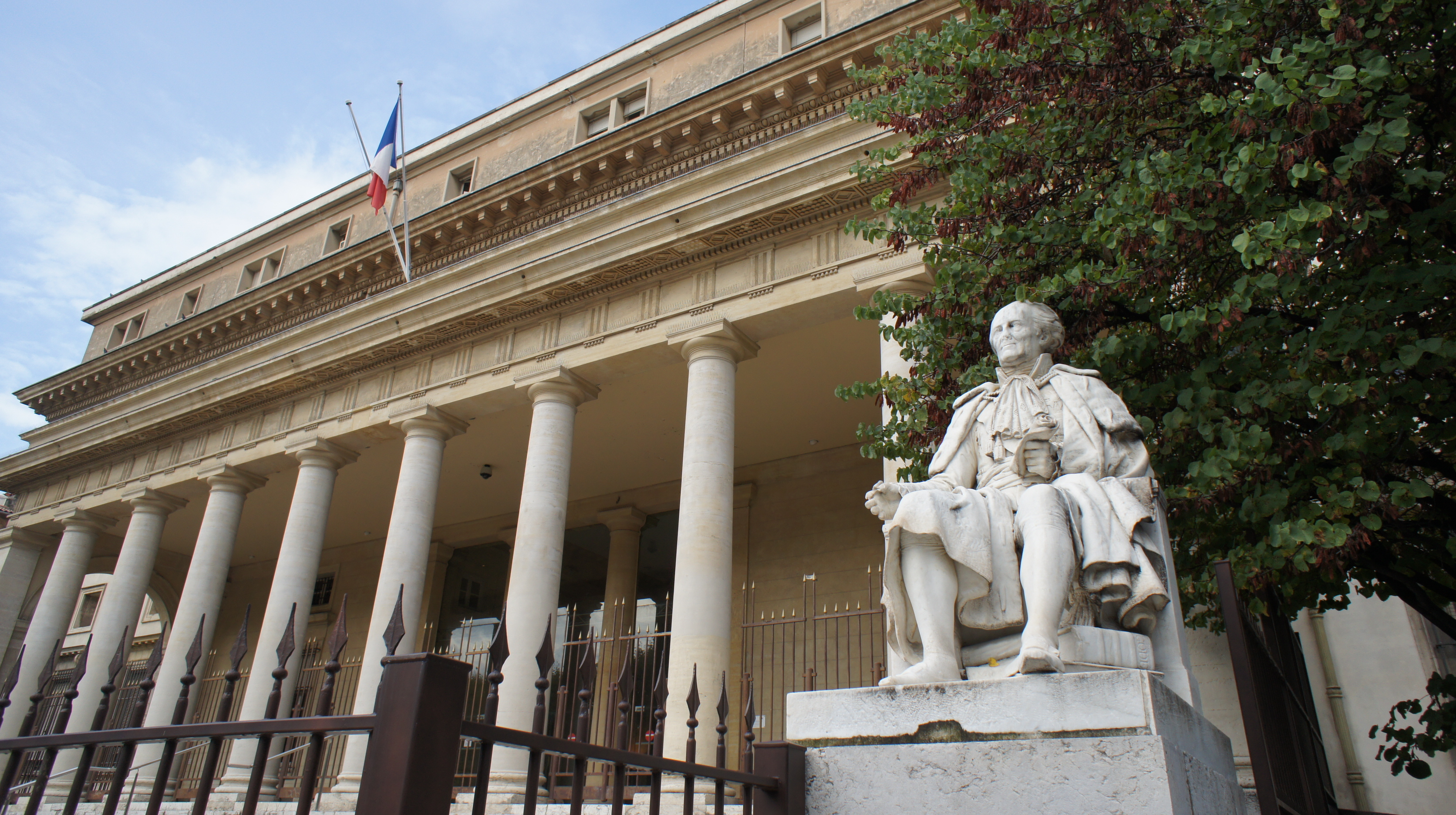
Palace of Justice with sculpture of Joseph Jérôme, Comte Siméon on the right side

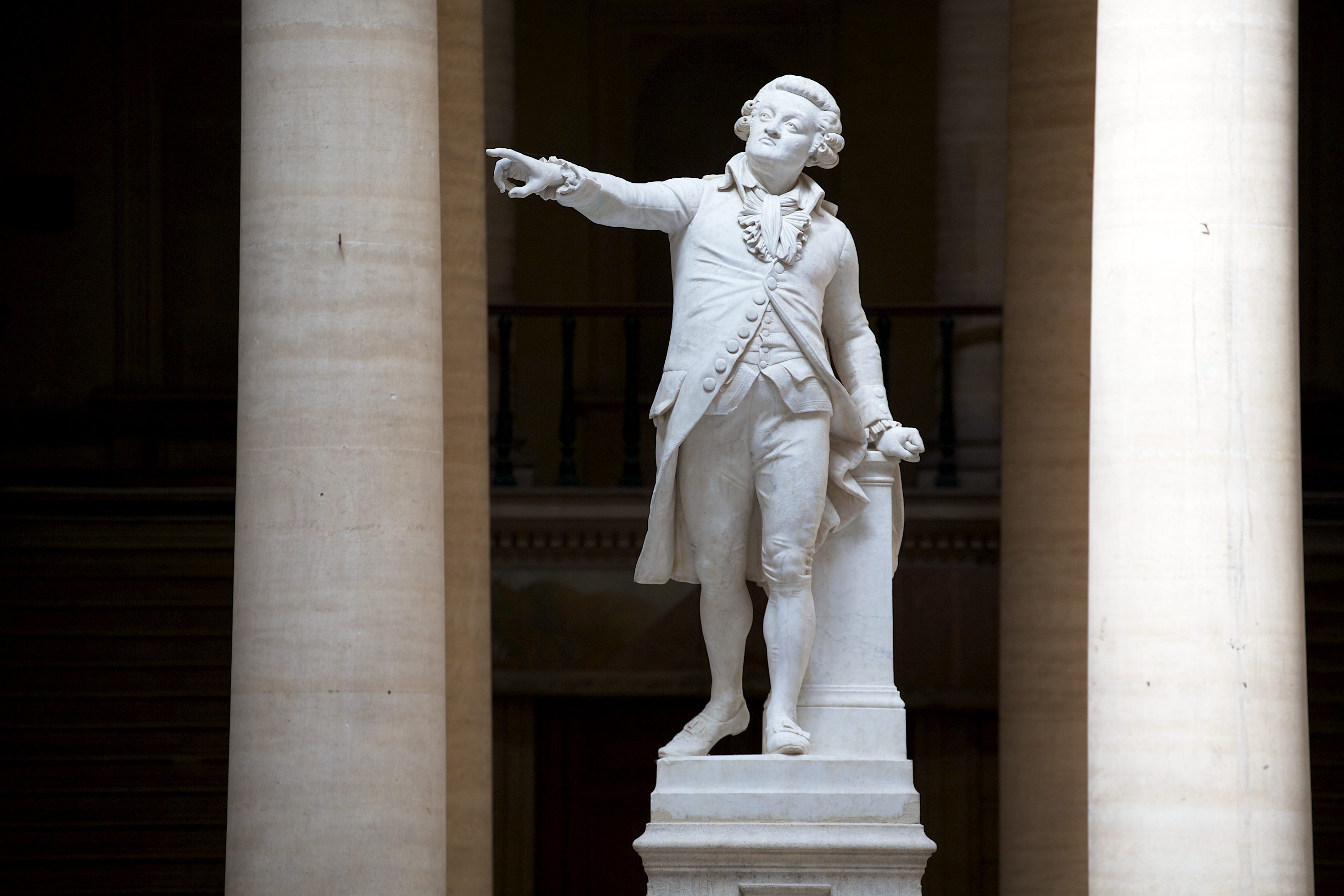
Sculpture of Honoré Gabriel Riqueti, comte de Mirabeau inside the Palace of Justice

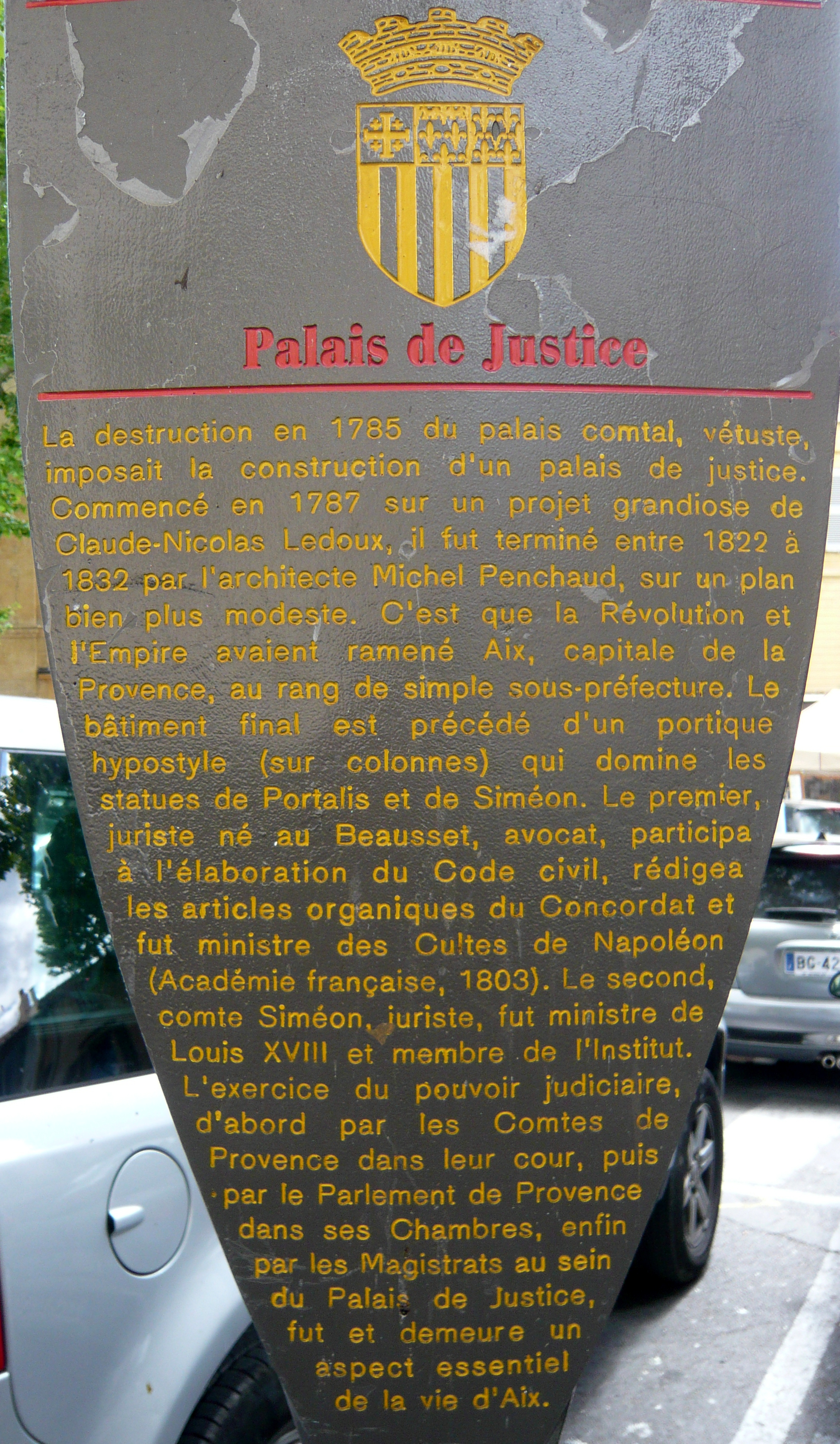
Historical marker about the Palace of Justice
