= 6th arrondissement of Marseille =

- Municipal arrondissement
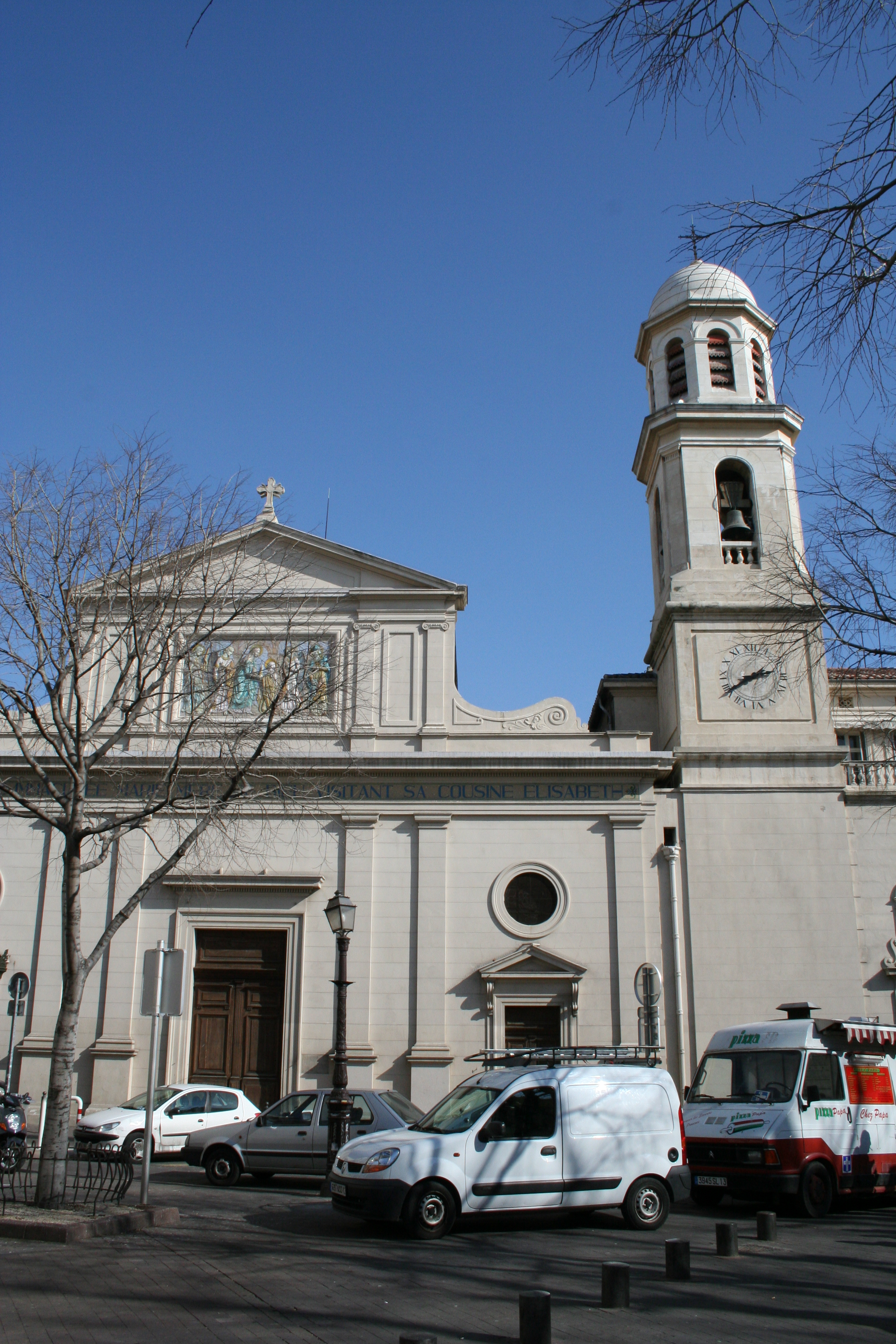
- Notre Dame du Mont church within the 6th arrondissement

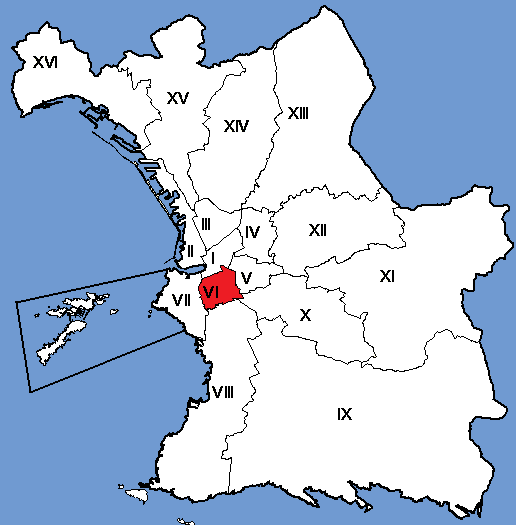
- Location within Marseille
- Interactive map of 6th arrondissement of Marseille
- Coordinates: 43°17′15″N 5°22′51″E
- Country: France
- Region: Provence-Alpes-Côte d'Azur
- Department: Bouches-du-Rhône
- Commune: Marseille

Government
  - Mayor (2020–2026): Pierre Benarroche (UG)
- Area: 2.10 km^{2} (0.81 sq mi)
- Population (2023): 38,476
  - Density: 18,300/km^{2} (47,500/sq mi)
- INSEE code: 13206

The 6th arrondissement of Marseille is one of the 16 arrondissements of Marseille. It is governed locally together with the 8th arrondissement, with which it forms the 4th sector of Marseille.

== Principal monuments ==
- Basilique Notre-Dame de la Garde
- Église Saint-Joseph
- Hôtel de préfecture des Bouches-du-Rhône
- Place Castellane

== Demographics ==
Historical population
| Year | Pop. | ±% p.a. |
|---|---|---|
| 1968 | 53,372 | — |
| 1975 | 47,661 | −1.60% |
| 1982 | 44,715 | −0.91% |
| 1990 | 39,263 | −1.61% |
| 1999 | 41,161 | +0.53% |
| 2007 | 43,360 | +0.65% |
| 2012 | 41,838 | −0.71% |
| 2017 | 42,827 | +0.47% |
| 2023 | 38,476 | −1.77% |
Source: INSEE

| Neighbourhood | Population (2022) |
|---|---|
| Castellane | 6,152 |
| Lodi | 9,118 |
| Notre-Dame du Mont | 6,266 |
| Palais de Justice | 4,902 |
| Préfecture | 3,086 |
| Vauban | 9,277 |
