= Arch of Trajan =

Arch of Trajan may refer to:

- Arch of Trajan (Ancona), Italy
- Arch of Trajan (Benevento), Italy
- Arch of Trajan (Canosa), Italy
- Arch of Trajan (Mactaris), Maktar, Tunisia
- Arch of Trajan (Mérida), Spain
- Arch of Trajan (Rome), Italy
- Arch of Trajan (Timgad), Algeria
