= Michel-Robert Penchaud =

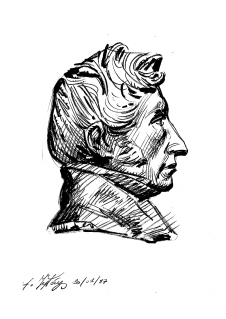
Michel-Robert Penchaud.

Michel-Robert Penchaud (1772, Lhommaizé, Vienne – 1833, Marseille) was a French architect.

== Biography ==
=== Early life ===
The son of Robert-Louis Penchaud, a provincial architect of Poitou and grandson of a mason who died in Paris, in 1756, his forced enrollment in the Armée de l'Ouest during the Revolution interrupted his studies.

=== Career ===
In 1795, he was admitted to the architectural studio, a virtual academy, of Percier and Fontaine in Paris. He was soon employed as a draughtsman by the Conseil des Bâtiments civils and participated in numerous public competitions organised by the Ministry of the Interior. In 1803, A.-C. Thibaudeau, the prefect of the Bouches-du-Rhône, named him to the post of architect to the City of Marseille, with as his first grand civil project, the glasshouses of the botanical garden. But, caught up in quarrels between Thibaudeau and the mayor of Marseille, Antoine-Ignace d'Antoine, he found himself replaced by another architect Louis-Gabriel Michaud, 1807-12.

During this period of official ostracism at Marseille he was kept occupied from Paris by the Ministry of the Interior, which commissioned him to act as arbitrator in works in Languedoc and to prepare preliminary studies for the projected restoration of monuments of Roman antiquity in the Midi: the Flavian Bridge at Saint-Chamas, remains at Saint-Rémy-de-Provence, the Maison Carrée of Nîmes, the Roman temple at Vernègues, the amphitheatre of Arles. Penchaud visualised collecting his papers into a descriptive work on the Roman monuments of the south of France, as a counterweight to the tour of Italian studies that were considered a necessary preparation for a career as architect in France. These articles were eventually published in a somewhat different form in the Statistique du département des Bouches-du Rhône.

The prefect Thibaudeau, wishing to attach his services more permanently, named Penchaud architect to the département in 1808, and in 1812 Penchaud returned to the civil position from which he had been ousted in Marseille, following the unsatisfactory work of Michaud in transforming the former Hôtel Roux-de-Corse into the seat of the Préfecture. Penchaud occupied these double posts, in the city and the département, resisting temptations to be drawn to the larger sphere of patronage in Paris, until his death in 1833.

His lasting monuments at Marseille all date from the period of the Bourbon restoration:

- The triumphal arch called the Porte d'Aix;
- The Hôpital Caroline on the Île de Ratonneau;
- The temple protestant in rue Grignan, Marseille.
