= Pierre Joseph Chardigny =

French sculptor and medal designer

- Born: 20 February 1794; Aix-en-Provence, France
- Died: 20 April 1866 (aged 72); Paris, France
- Occupation: Sculptor
- Parent(s): Barthélémy-François Chardigny; Marie Rose Demongé

Pierre Joseph Chardigny (1794–1866) was a French sculptor and medal designer.

== Early life ==
Pierre Joseph Chardigny was born in 1794 in Aix-en-Provence. His father, Barthélémy-François Chardigny, was a sculptor. He learned sculpture from François Joseph Bosio.

== Career ==
Chardigny designed many sculptures, some of which are held in the permanent collections of the Metropolitan Museum of Art, the Princeton University Art Museum, the Château de Pau, and the Musée Baron-Martin.

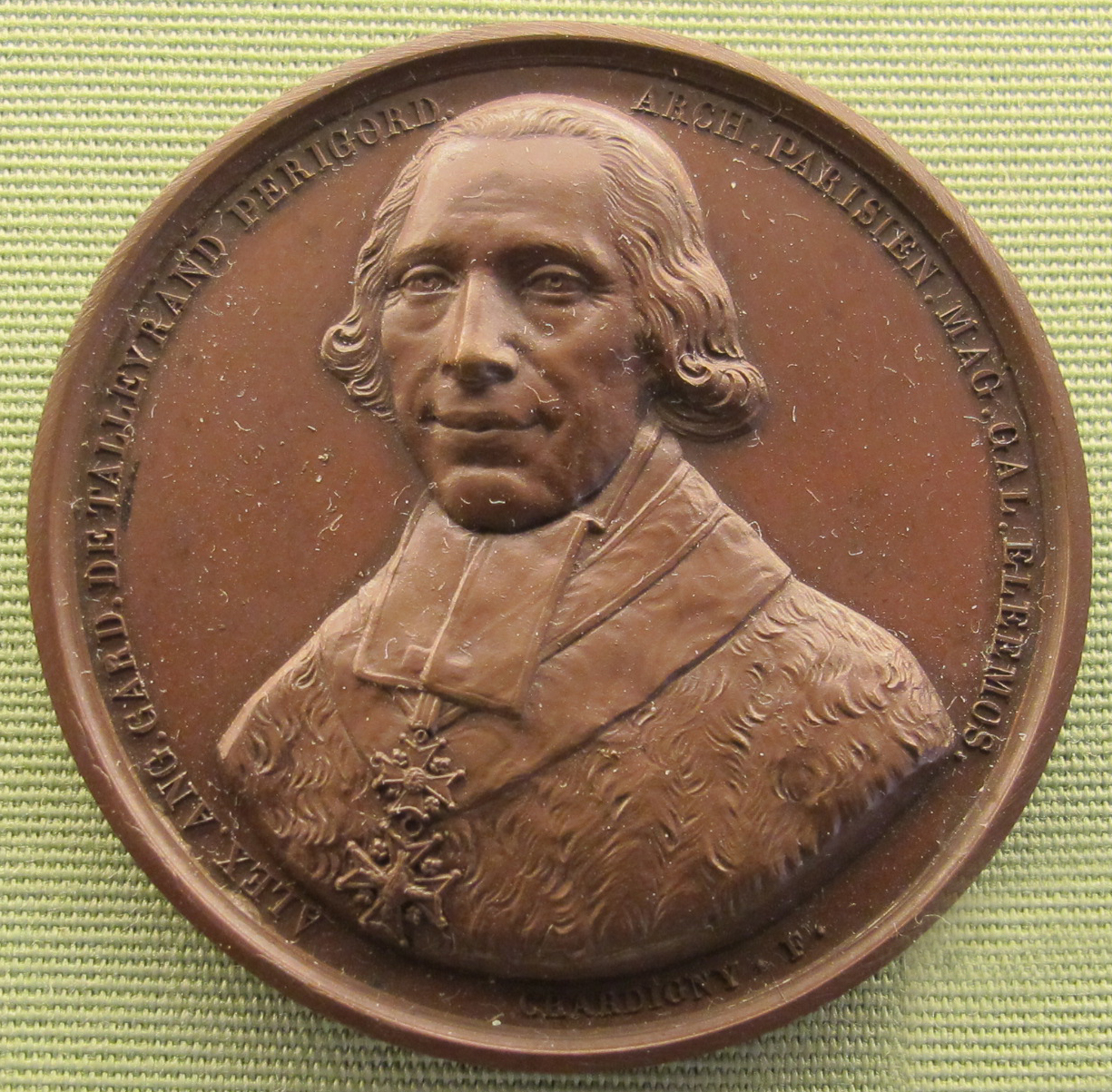
Medal depicting Alexandre Angélique de Talleyrand-Périgord, designed by Chardigny.

Chardigny suggested the design of a 100-foot statue in the shape of William Shakespeare in London, where visitors could go in, but it was turned down on the grounds that it would dehumanize him.

== Death ==
Chardigny died in 1866.
