= Thiers, Marseille =

Administrative quarter of the 1st arrondissement of Marseille

Coordinates: 43°17′49″N 5°22′57″E

Thiers (French pronunciation: [tjɛʁ]) is a neighbourhood (French: quartier) of the 1st arrondissement of Marseille. A cultural and student quarter in the centre of Marseille, it is located between Place Jean-Jaurès and La Canebière, near the Vieux-Port.

== Description ==
The centre of the district is the Lycée Thiers, the oldest school in Marseille, which gave it its name. A network of cultural institutions has developed around the school: at the end of the Place du Lycée is the Théâtre du Gymnase, and, on the premises of the school itself, the Couvent des Bernardines. In this district is the Église Saint-Vincent-de-Paul, a néo-gothic church dedicated in 1886.

The headquarters of the Faculty of Economics and Management of Aix-Marseille is also located here, 95 Long des Capucins Street.

== History ==
The school and the district owe their name to Adolphe Thiers (1797-1877), first President of the French Third Republic, born in Bouc-Bel-Air situated between Marseille, Gardanne and Aix-en-Provence.

The district was sealed off by the Vichy militia during the Occupation of France by Nazi Germany, and the school was used as police headquarters.

The district was the epicentre of the May 68 demonstrations in Marseille.

In the early 2020s, the school built a boarding school in the street next to the school, rue Sénac-de-Meilhan, in two six-storey buildings for the students of the school and the preparatory classes.
