= Hôtel Pesciolini =

Coordinates: 43.2992°N 5.3764°E

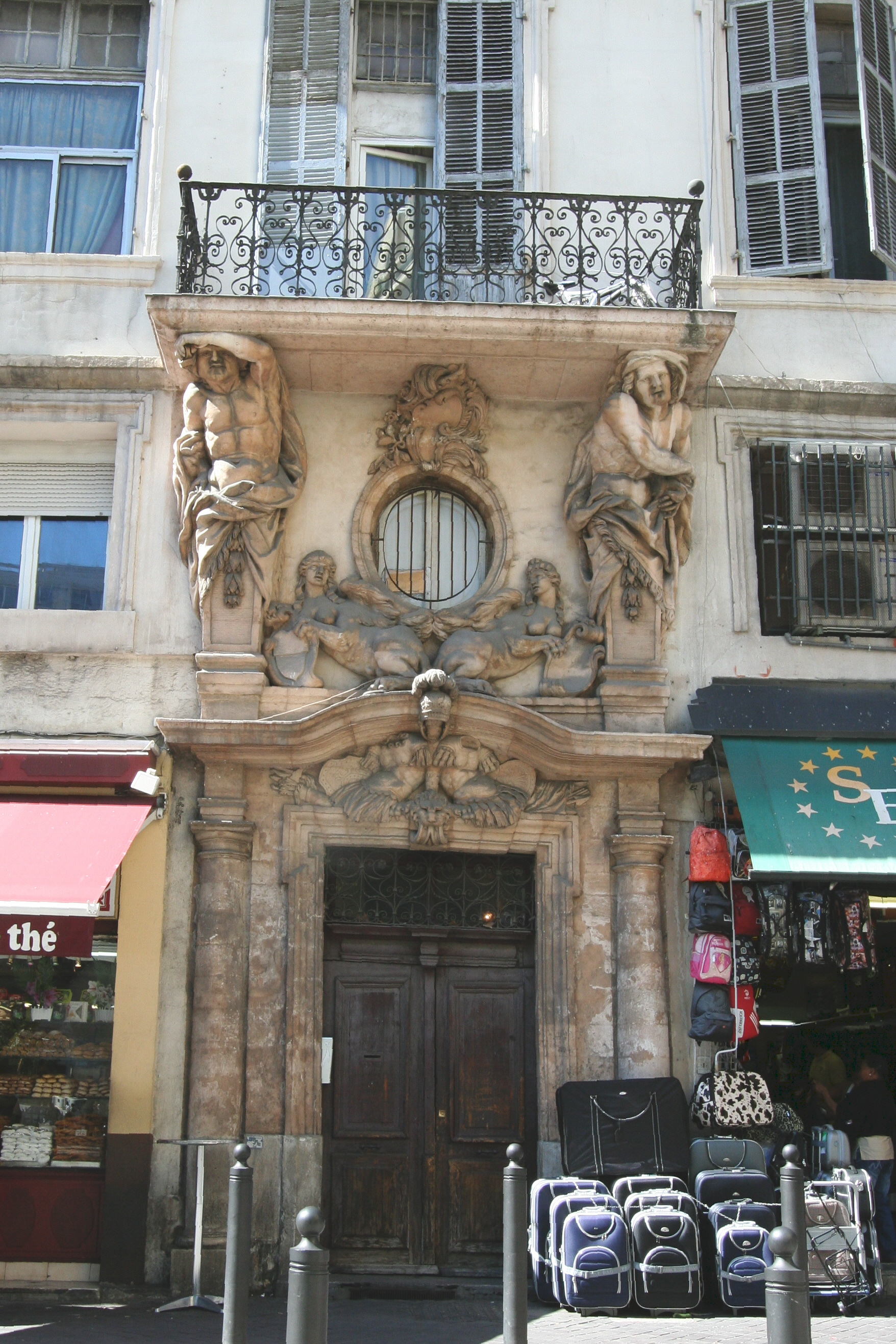
- Interactive map of the Hôtel Pesciolini area

General information
- Type: Hôtel particulier
- Location: 1 rue Nationale, Marseille, France
- Construction started: 1672
- Completed: 1673

The Hôtel Pesciolini is a hôtel particulier in the 1st arrondissement of Marseille, France. It has been listed as an official historical monument since March 8, 1929.
