= André Chave =

French landowner and real estate developer

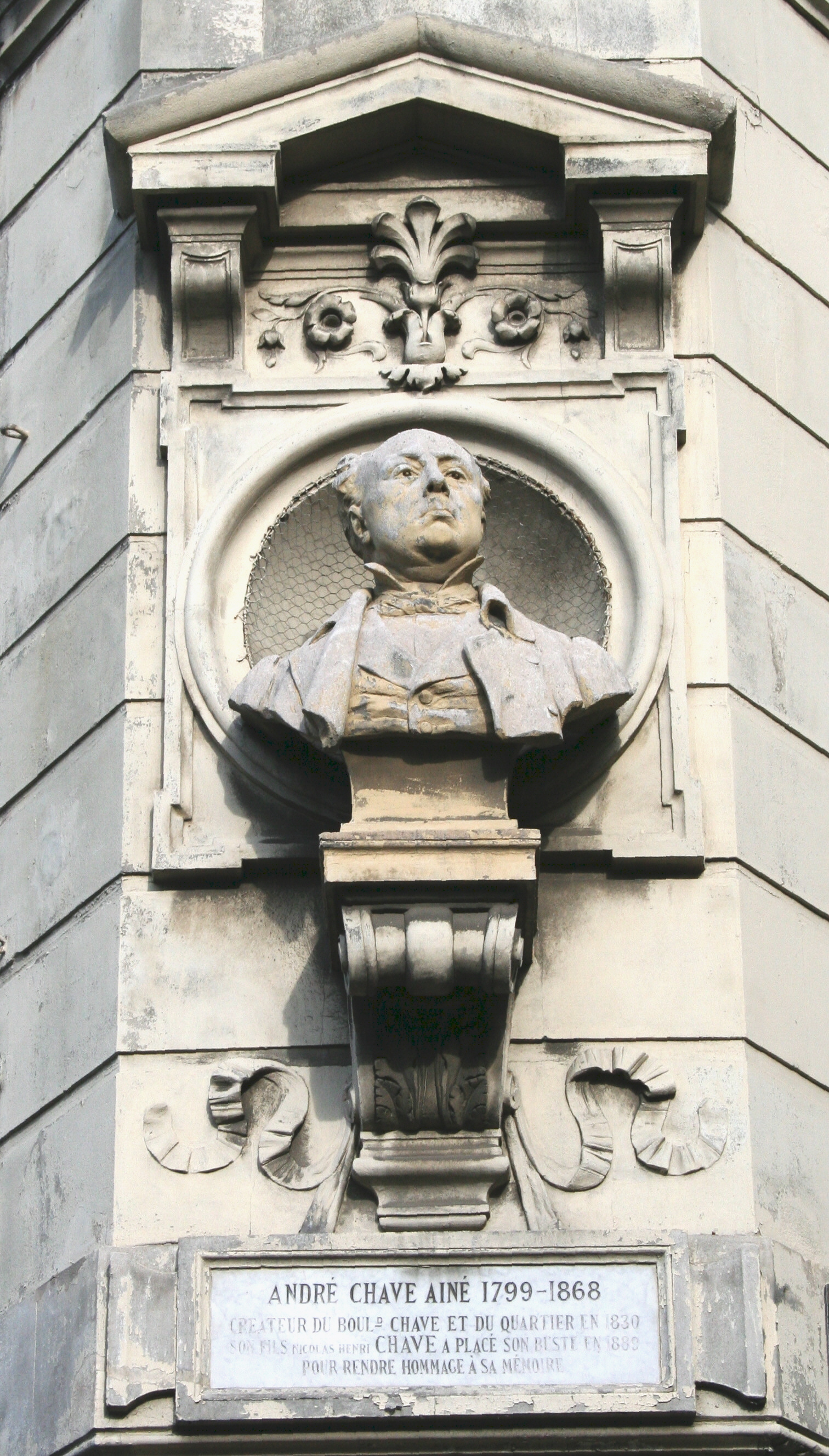
- Bust of André Chave by André-Joseph Allar on the corner of Boulevard Chave and Place Jean Jaurès in Marseille
- Born: 1799
- Died: 1868 (aged 68–69)
- Occupations: Landowner; Real estate developer
- Children: Nicolas Chave

André Chave (French pronunciation: [ɑ̃dʁe ʃav]; 1799-1868) was a French landowner and real estate developer in Marseille.

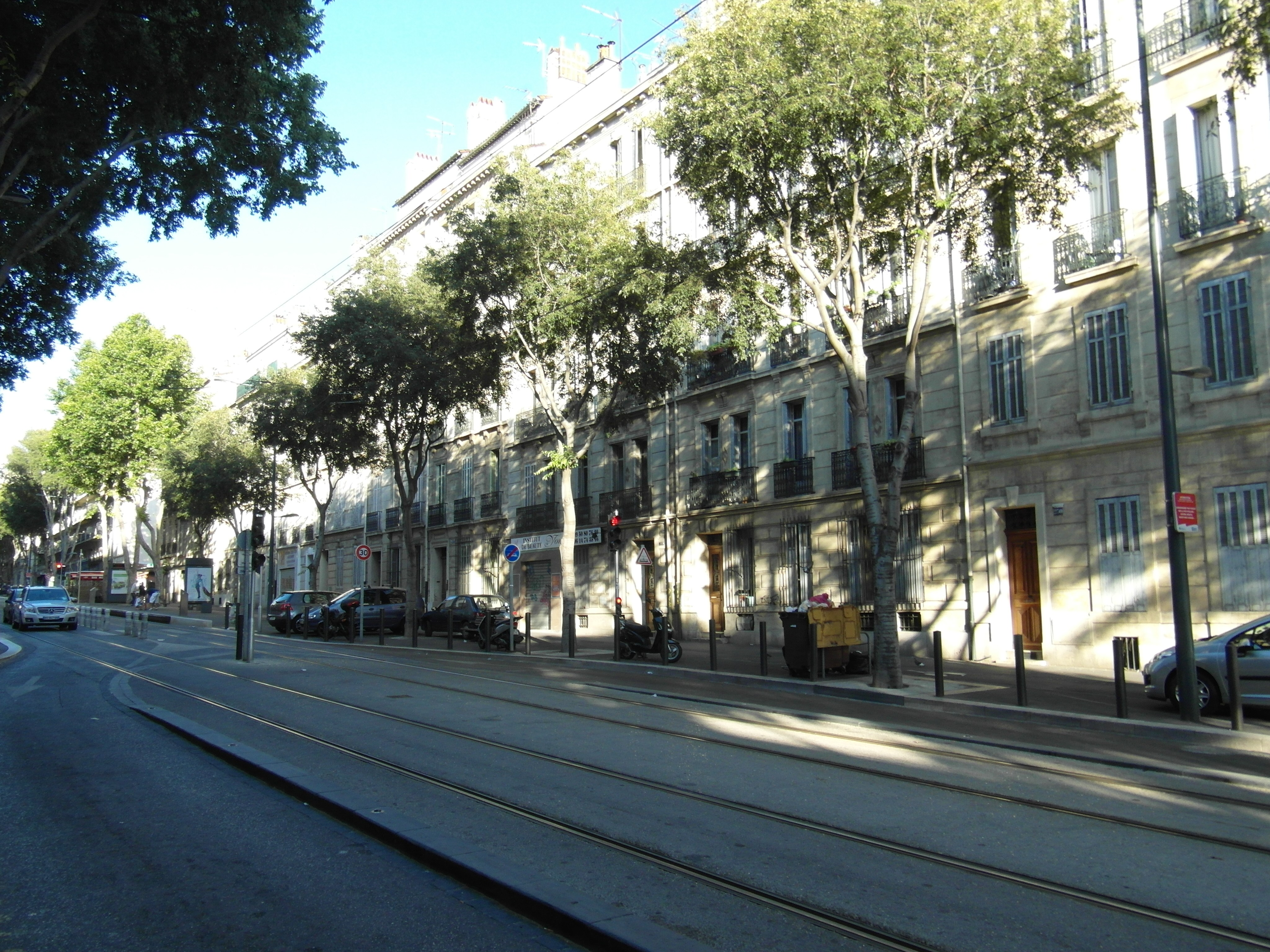
Boulevard Chave in Marseille

== Early life ==
André Chave was born in 1799.

== Career ==
A major landowner of agricultural fields, he became a real estate developer as the city of Marseille grew. As explained on his public bust, he developed the neighbourhood of Le Camas, and what later came to be known as the Boulevard Chave, both in the 5th arrondissement of Marseille.

== Personal life ==
He had a son, Nicolas Chave, who inherited the neighbourhood developed by his father. He commissioned architect Gaudensi Allar (1841-1904) to build a private residence on the corner of the Boulevard Chave and the Place Jean Jaurès. The architect's brother, André-Joseph Allar (1845-1926), designed a bust of his father, which is still displayed there.

== Death ==
He died in 1868.

== Legacy ==
- The Boulevard Chave in Marseille is named in his honour. It stretches from the Place Jean-Jaurès to Gare de Marseille-Blancarde.
- The Théâtre Chave, a theatre near the Place Jean-Jaurès, was established in 1840; it closed down shortly after.
- The Prison Chave was a jail on the corner of Rue Georges and Boulevard Chave. Built in 1852, all capital punishment executions in Marseille were carried out in front of this jail from 1912 to 1934. During World War II, it was used to jail Jews and members of the French Resistance, who published the newspaper L’Aube de la Liberté. It was demolished in 1958.
