= Place Jean-Jaurès =

Historic square in Marseille, France

Coordinates: 43.2950°N 5.3865°E

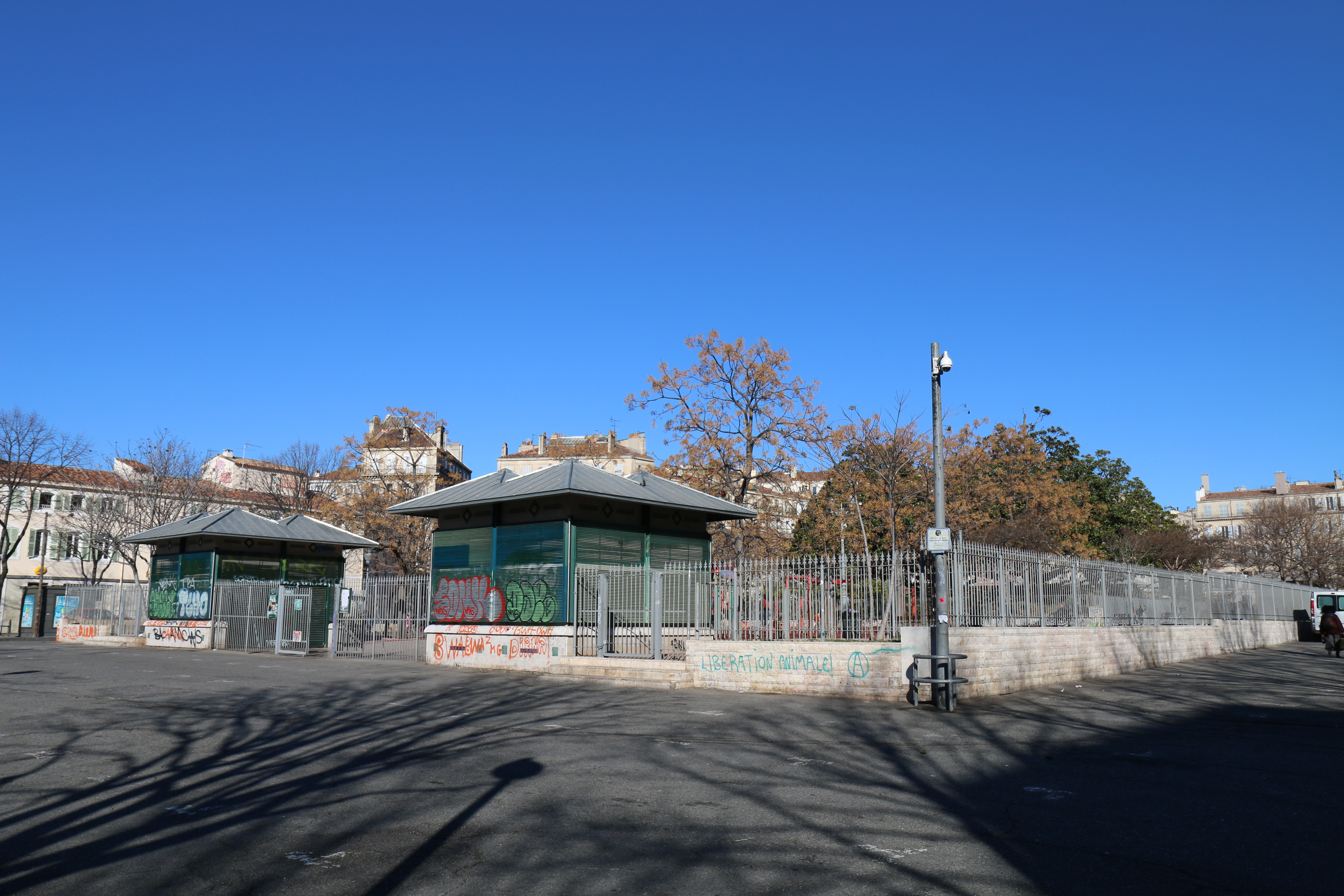
Place Jean-Jaurès

The Place Jean-Jaurès (French pronunciation: [plas ʒɑ̃ ʒɔʁɛs]), also known as La Plaine ([la plɛn]), is a historic square in Marseille, France. As early as the 13th century, it was a camping ground for Christian Crusaders on their way to the Holy Land. It later became a meeting place to welcome dignitaries and members of the French royal family. It is now home to a farmers' market. It is named after politician Jean Jaurès.

== Location ==
It is located at the intersection of the 1st, 5th, 6th arrondissements. From East to West, it can be reached via the Rue Curiol; Rue de la Bibliothèque; Rue des trois Mages; Rue Sibié; Rue Saint-Savournin; Rue Horace Bertin; Boulevard Chave; Rue de l'Olivier; Rue Ferrari; Rue Saint-Pierre; Rue Ferdinand Rey; Rue Saint-Michel; and Rue André Poggioli.

Jean Jaurès Square is located in the medieval area of Montpellier, at the intersection of Lodge Street and Needleword Street. This pedestrian square is a rectangular space, measuring about 164 feet on each side. It features a statue of Jean Jaurès and numerous bars with terraces shaded by plane trees.

The square occupies the site created by the 1794 demolition of the old Church of Our Lady of the Tablets, which dated back to the 11th century. The church earned its name from the money changers who conducted their business inside. It should not be confused with another nearby church of Our Lady.

== History ==
The square was established as a camping ground for Christian Crusaders on their way to the Holy Land in the 13th century.

It became a meeting place to welcome dignitaries and members of the French royal family. On May 22, 1319, Robert, King of Naples and his wife, Sancha of Majorca, were welcome here on their way to see the relics of Robert's brother, Louis of Toulouse. Shortly after the Battle of Marignano in 1515, King Francis I of France and his wife, Queen Claude of France were welcome here by Bishop Claude de Seyssel and viguier Louis de Vento. On November 6, 1564, King Charles IX of France, his mother Queen Catherine de' Medici, and his brother, the future King Henry III of France, were welcome here. On November 7, 1662, King Louis XIII was welcomed here by Consul Boniface de Cabannes.

On October 5, 1845, Saint Eugène de Mazenod, then the Bishop of Marseille, blessed a new church bell named "Marie Joséphine" here before installing it at the Notre-Dame de la Garde.

On November 14, 1886, Louis Capazza and Alphonse Fondère took off in a balloon from here and flew all the way to Corsica. As a result, a commemorative sculpture by Louis Botinelly on the corner of rue Sibié and Place Jean-Jaurès was dedicated on November 16, 1930, by aviators Dieudonné Costes and Maurice Bellonte.

In 1889, Nicolas Chave, the son of landowner and developer André Chave, commissioned architect Gaudensi Allar to design a house on the corner of the Boulevard Chave and the square.

The square was described by French author Jean Giono in his 1947 novelist Noé.

In 2016, a competition was realized to renovate the Place, which was met with stark opposition by the local residents when implementation started in 2018, seeing riots and confrontations with police and security forces. The lack of participation and consultation as well as the concomitance of the building collapse Rue d'Aubagne exacerbated the conflict.

It was, before the renovation, home to a daily farmers' market except for Sundays, from 7:30Am to 1:30PM. On Tuesdays, Thursdays and Saturdays, the market is mostly set up for fresh vegetables and fruits. On Wednesdays, only flowers are sold. It was one of the largest farmers' markets in Marseille.
