= Jules Cantini =

French sculptor and philanthropist

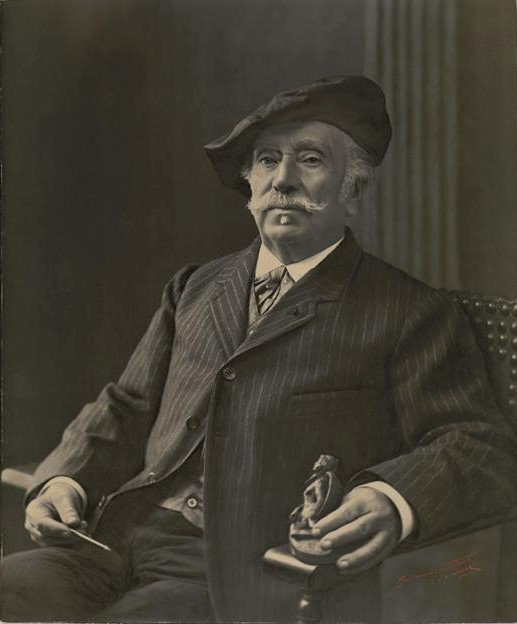
- Born: 2 February 1826; Marseille, Bouches-du-Rhône, France
- Died: 12 December 1916 (aged 90); Marseille, Bouches-du-Rhône, France
- Occupations: Sculptor, philanthropist
- Parent(s): Gaétan Cantini; Thérèse (Farci) Cantini

Jules Cantini (1826–1916) was a French sculptor and philanthropist.

== Biography ==
=== Early life ===
Jules Cantini was born on 2 February 1826 in Marseille, Bouches-du-Rhône, France. His father was Gaétan Cantini, an Italian mason, and his mother, Thérèse (Farci) Cantini.

=== Career ===
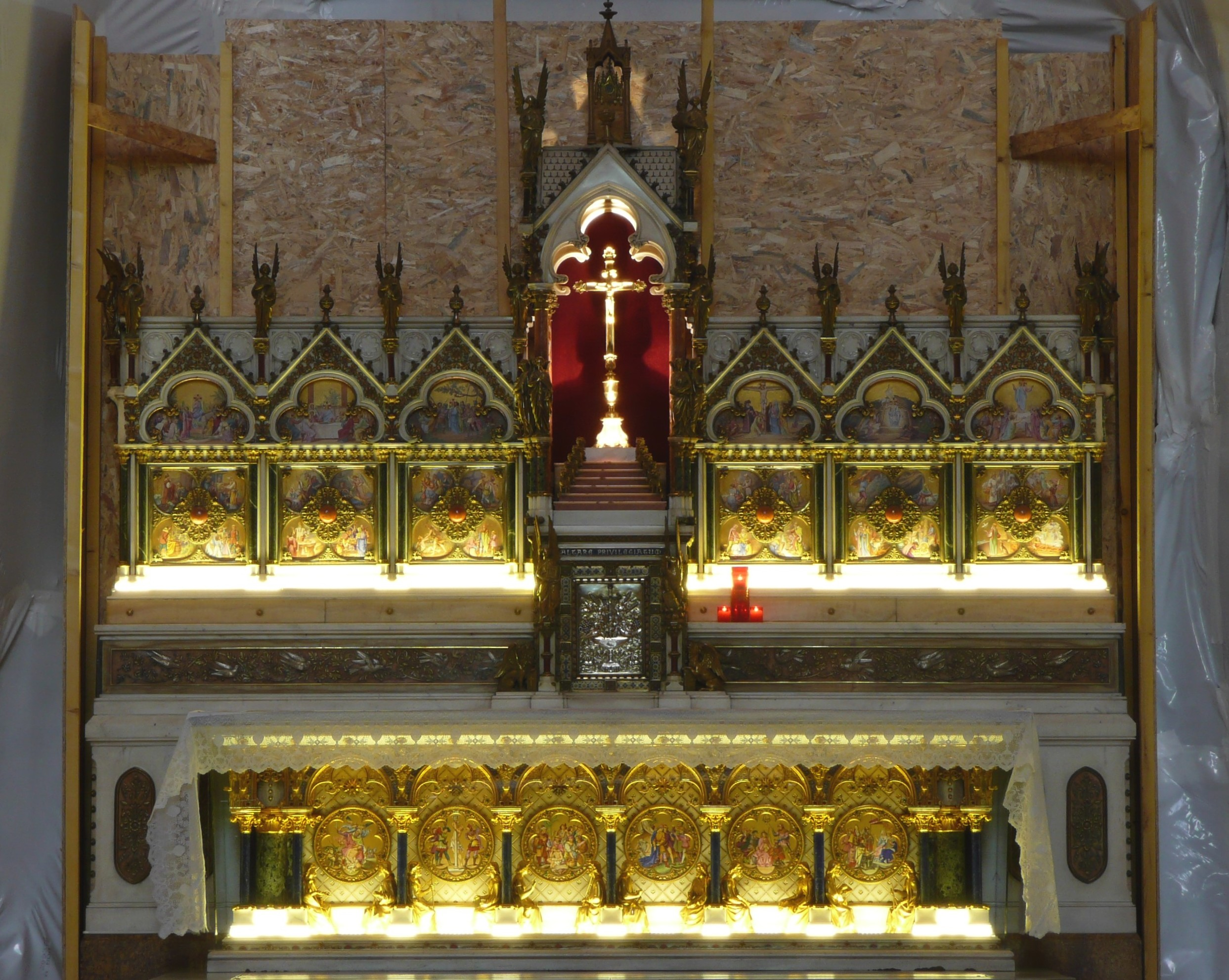
Altar designed by Jules Cantini inside the Eglise Saint-Vincent-de-Paul in Marseille

He was a sculptor. In 1903, he did a marble replica of Michelangelo's David, which can be seen near the Plages du Prado in Marseille.

Some of his work can be found in Roman Catholic churches in Marseille. He designed the high altar inside the Église Saint-Vincent-de-Paul. Additionally, he designed the altars in the Marseille Cathedral. He also designed the altar in the Église Sainte-Agathe des Camoins. In 1886, he designed a statue of Saint Peter for Notre-Dame de la Garde.

Moreover, he designed the fountain in the gardens of the Château Simone in Meyreuil.

In 1911, he donated the fountain on the Place Castellane, which was sculpted by André-Joseph Allar (1845-1926). During its dedication on 12 November 1911 Bernard Cadenat (1853-1930), who served as the mayor of Marseille from 1910 to 1912, compared him to Crinas, this, "doctor who donated his wealth for the restoration of the fortresses and the ramparts of the city" in the first century.

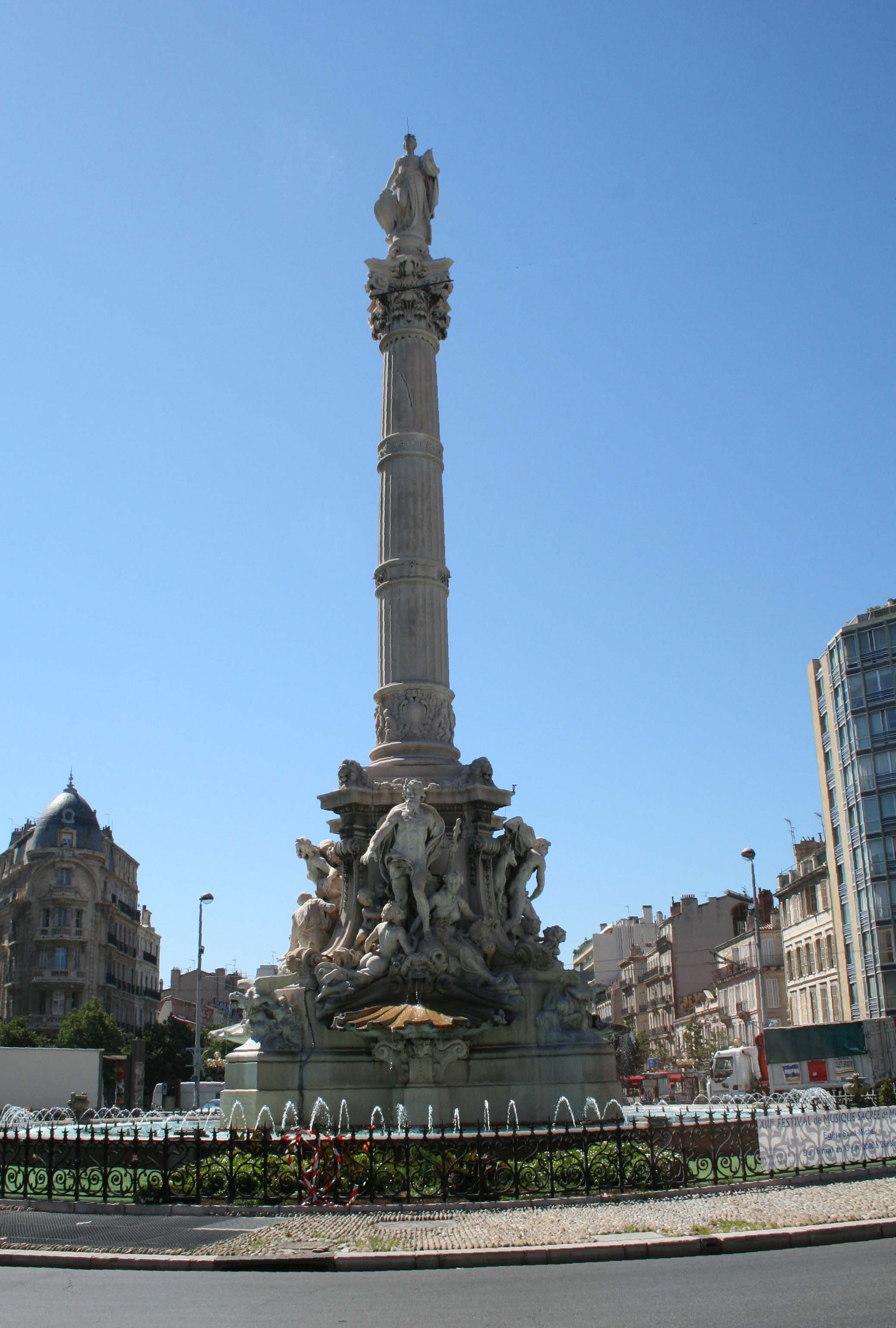
Fountain of the Place Castellane donated by Jules Cantini

=== Personal life ===
He married Rose Lemasle on 30 September 1856.

=== Death ===
He died on 12 December 1916 in Marseille.

=== Legacy ===
- The Musée Cantini is named in his honor; it is housed in his former private residence.
- The Avenue Jules Cantini in Marseille is named in his honor.
