= Boulevard Chave =

Coordinates: 43.2955°N 5.3952°E

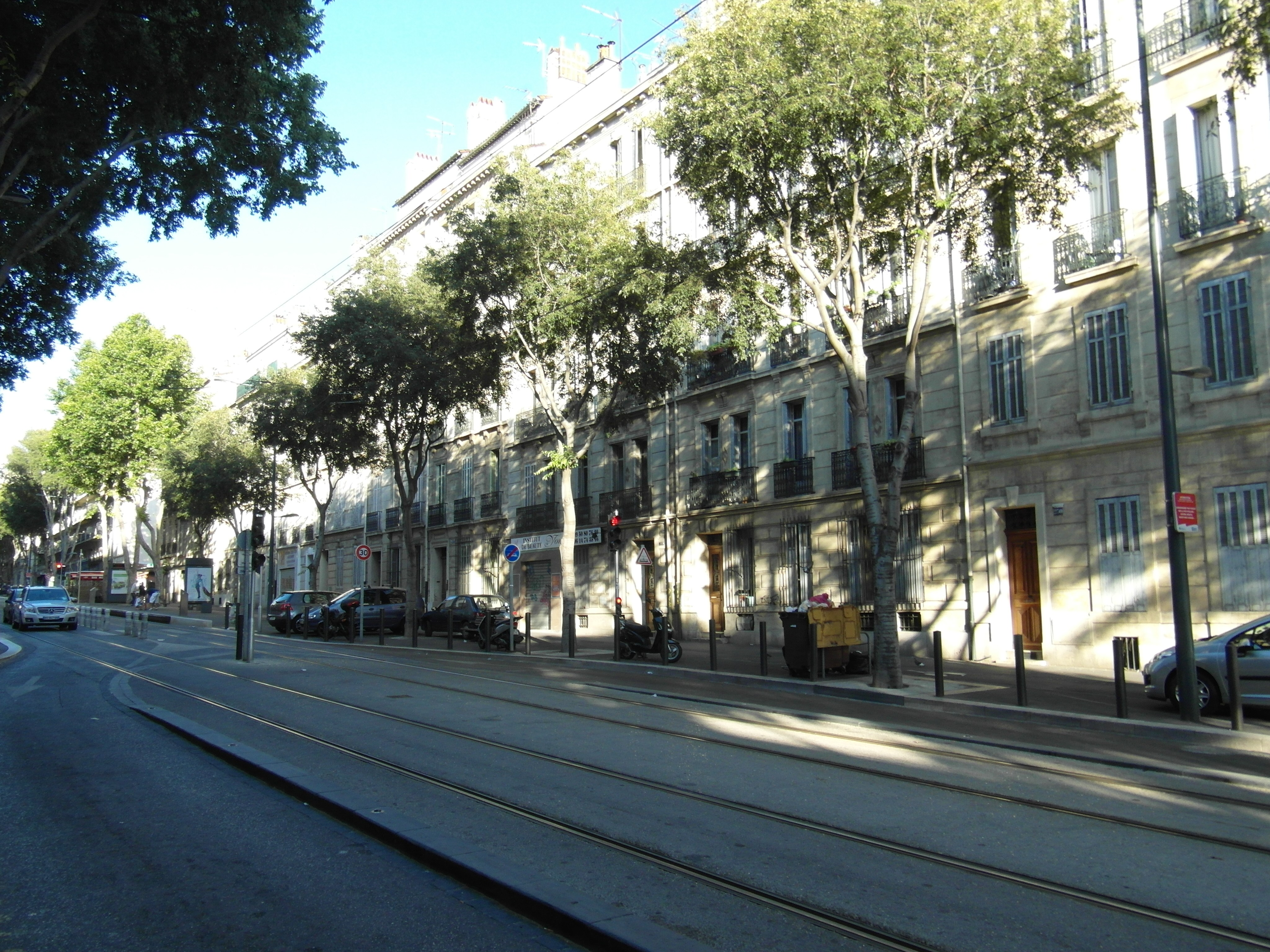
- A view of the Boulevard Chave, with tram tracks and sycamore trees
- Location: Marseille, France
- West end: Place Jean-Jaurès
- East end: Gare de Marseille-Blancarde

The Boulevard Chave (French pronunciation: [bulvaʁ ʃav]) is a major boulevard in Marseille, France. Built in 1842 and named in honor of landowner André Chave, it has had a tramline since 1892.

== Location ==
The Boulevard Chave is located in the 5th arrondissement of Marseille. It runs from the Place Jean-Jaurès all the way down to the Gare de Marseille-Blancarde. It is 1,525 metres (5,003 ft) long and 25 metres (82 ft) wide.

It is bisected by the Rue de Bruys, Rue Eugène Pierre, Rue du Progrès, Rue de l'Église Saint-Michel, Rue Goudard, Rue Escoffier, Rue Louis Astruc, Rue du Camas, Rue George (left) and Rue du Docteur Simone Sedan (right), Rue Madon, Boulevard Sakakini, Rue Berthe Simon, Rue de l’Éguier (left) and Rue Jean Martin (right), Rue Monier, Boulevard Boisson, Traverse de l'Équateur (left) and Rue Audibert (right), and Rue Yves Chapuis.

== History and landmarks ==
The boulevard was named in honor of André Chave (1799–1868), a landowner and real estate developer. It was built in 1842 to accommodate the middle class.

Most buildings are three storeys high, with three widows. There are also Art Nouveau buildings.

On the corner of the Boulevard Chave and the Rue George, a prison was built in the 1850s. It was demolished in 1958 and later replaced with a primary school.

In 1892, the Compagnie du chemin de fer de l'Est-Marseille established a tramline along the boulevard. On the west side, they built an underground tram tunnel, going all the way to the Gare de Noailles.

The boulevard was mentioned by French novelist Émile Zola in Chapter 13 of his 1895 novel entitled Les Mystères de Marseille.

French actor Fernandel (1903-1971) was born at 72 Boulevard Chave. A bust in his honor now stands outside the building.

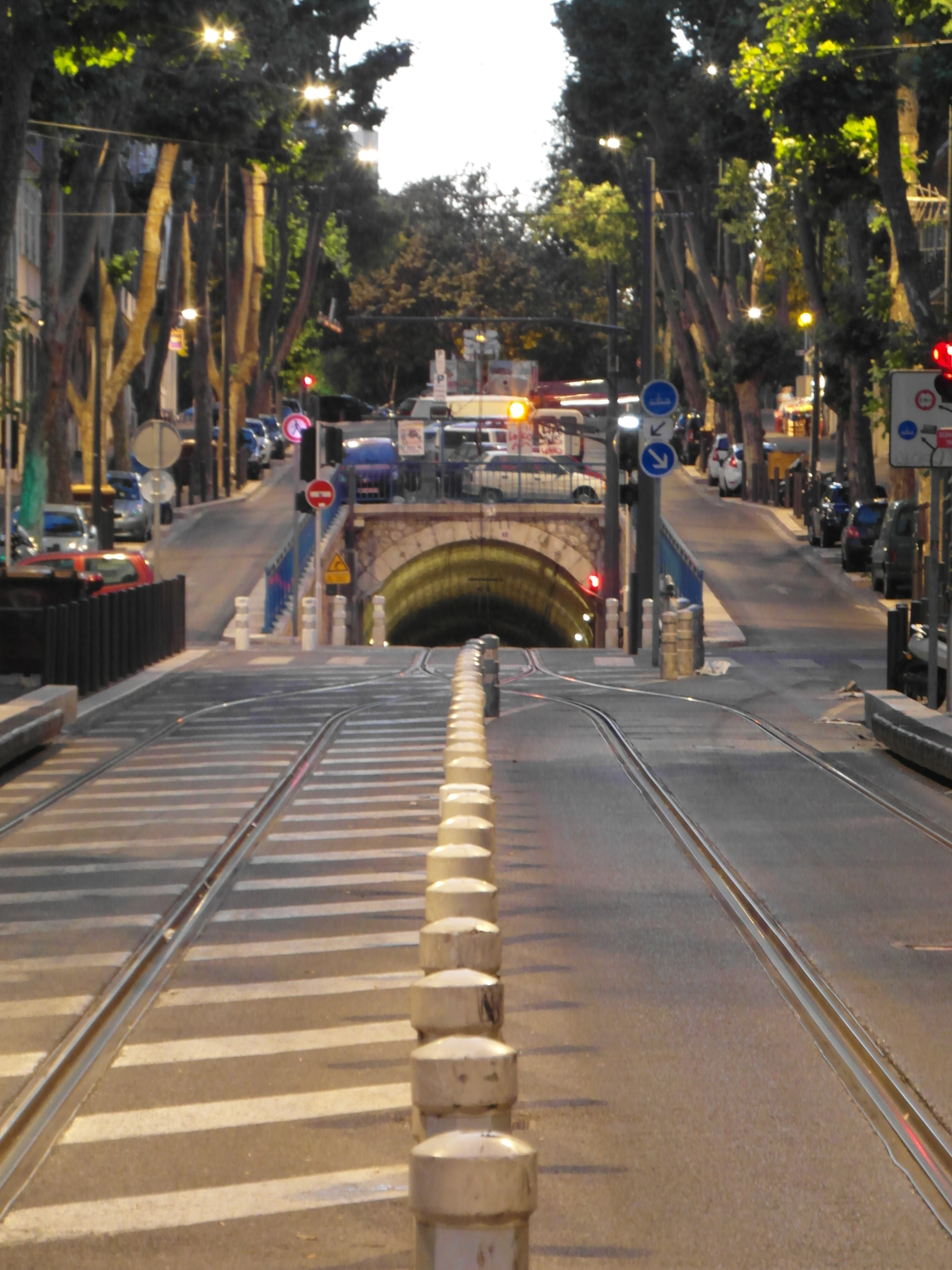
Underground tram tunnel.
