= Place Castellane =

Coordinates: 43.2859°N 5.3837°E

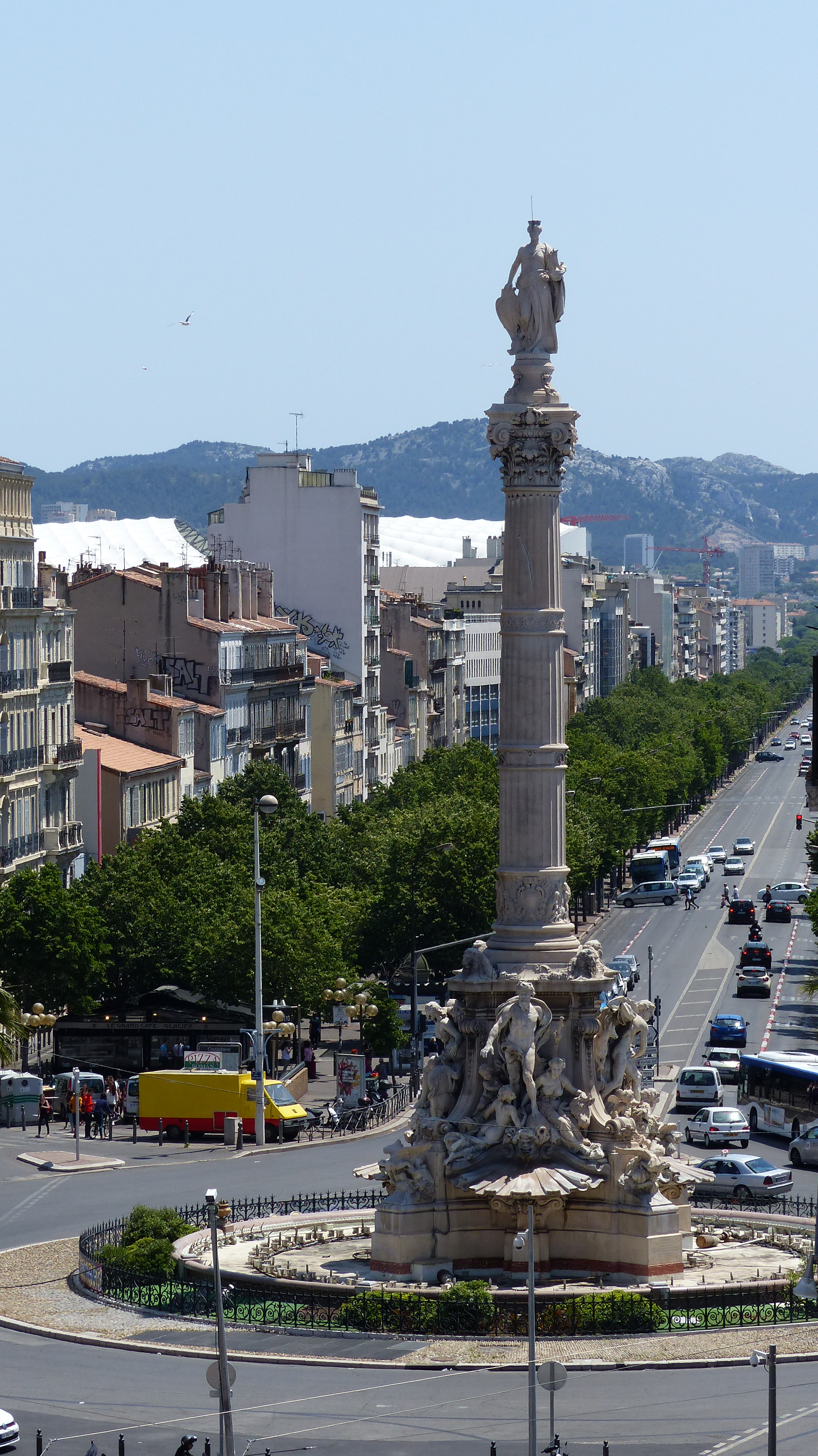
The Place Castellane in 2015.

The Place Castellane is a historic square in the 6th arrondissement of Marseille, Bouches-du-Rhône, France. It was built in 1774.

== History ==
The square was named for Henri-César de Castellane-Majastre, an aristocrat best known for his service in the American Revolutionary War, commanding the frigate Flore and later the 74-gun Marseillais. He took part in major engagements including the invasion of Tobago, the Battle of the Chesapeake, the Siege of Yorktown, and the Battle of Saint Kitts. His wartime service earned him induction into the Society of the Cincinnati in 1782, and he was promoted to Chef d'escadre in 1784. He donated the land for its construction in 1774. A fountain with an obelisk used as a lavoir was built in the middle of the square in 1798.

In 1911, the obelisk was relocated to Mazargues. Meanwhile, Jules Cantini donated a new fountain, which was designed by sculptor André-Joseph Allar. The fountain, completed in 1913, represents three Provençal rivers: the Durance, the Gardon, and the Rhône.

The square, with the original obelisk, is mentioned by Joseph Conrad in his 1919 novel entitled The Arrow of Gold.
