= Couvent des Bernardines =

Coordinates: 43.2964°N 5.3817°E

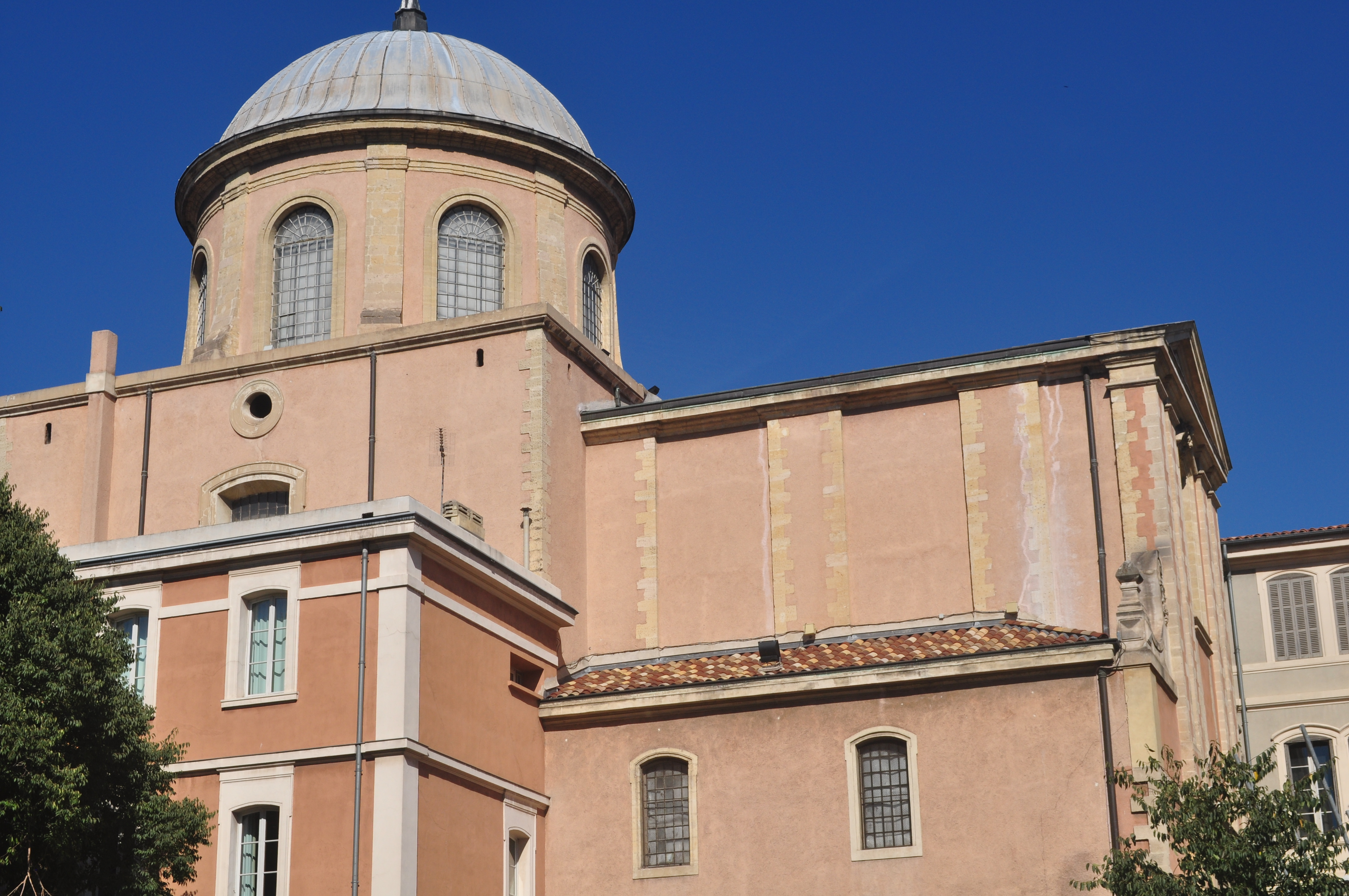
- The chapel in 2011.
- Interactive map of the Couvent des Bernardines area

General information
- Type: Convent
- Location: Marseille, France
- Completed: 1743

The Couvent des Bernardines (French pronunciation: [kuvɑ̃ de bɛʁnaʁdin]) is a historic building in the 1st arrondissement of Marseille, France. It was a Roman Catholic convent for the Bernardines from its construction in 1743 to the French Revolution. It has been home to a high school, the Lycée Thiers, since 1802. It has been a listed building since 1952.
