= Belsunce =

Coordinates: 43.2987°N 5.3764°E

Belsunce (French: [bɛlzœ̃s], locally [belˈzœ̃sə]) is a district near Canebière, central Marseille. It is within the 1st arrondissement. Its name was given by Monseigneur Henri François Xavier de Belsunce de Castelmoron, who famously helped during the Great Plague of Marseille.

Belsunce is a popular area from the "Centre Bourse" to the big shopping centre of central Marseille. It includes the famous Alcazar, an old theatre that has been converted into a library.
