= Gaudensi Allar =

French architect

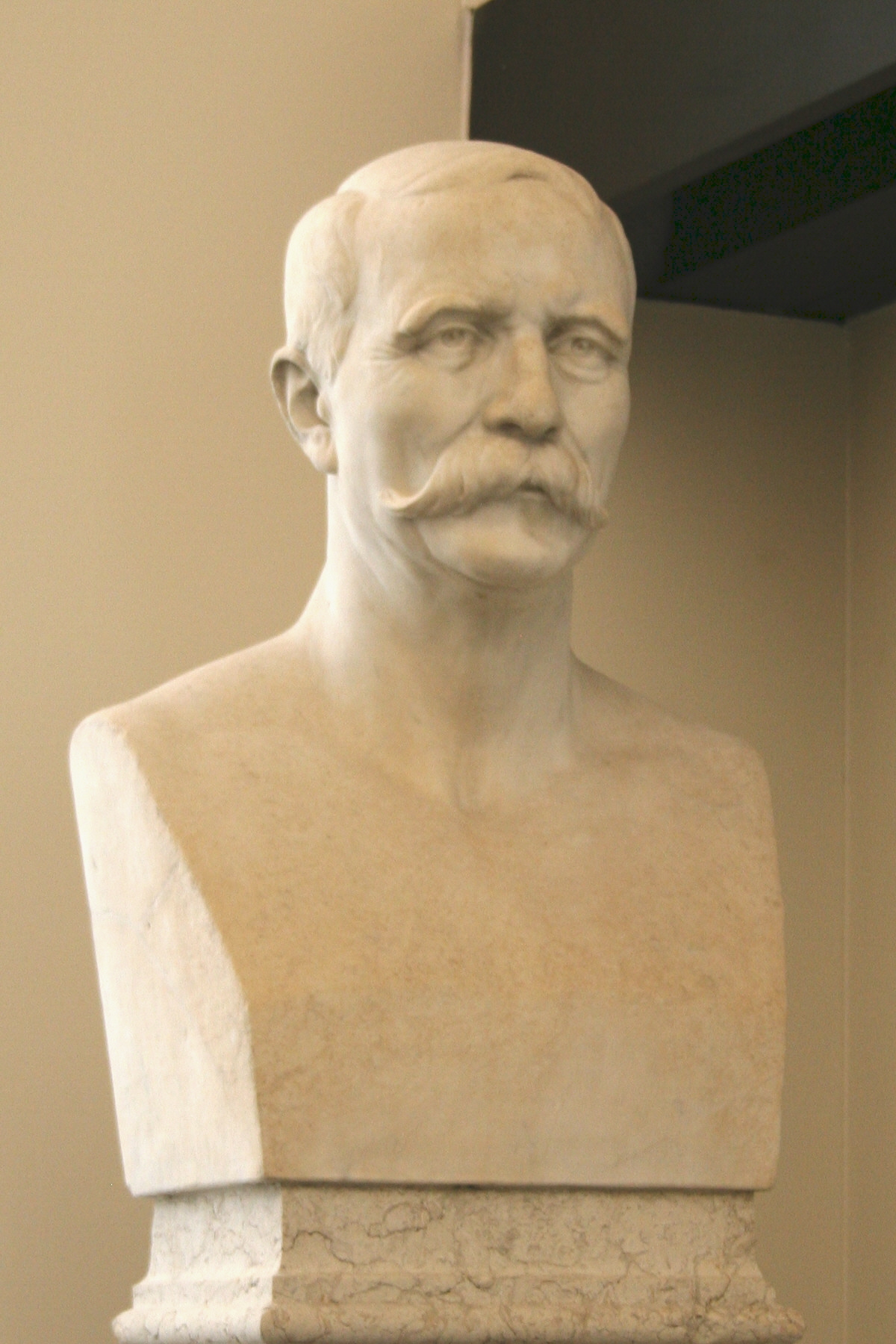
- Bust sculpted by his brother André-Joseph Allar
- Born: February 17, 1841
- Died: August 22, 1904 (aged 63)
- Occupation: Architect
- Relatives: André-Joseph Allar (brother)

Gaudensi Allar (February 17, 1841 – August 22, 1904) was a French architect.

== Early life ==
Gaudensi Allar was born on February 17, 1841. His brother was sculptor André-Joseph Allar (1845-1926). In 1854, he served aboard a ship in the Crimean War.

== Career ==
His first architectural work was the Ecole Rouvière, a primary school located at 83 Boulevard Redon in Marseille; his brother sculpted the facade.

In 1889, he was commissioned by Nicolas Chave, son of André Chave (1799-1868), to design a private residence on the corner of the Boulevard Chave and the Place Jean Jaurès in Marseille; his brother was asked to sculpt a bust of André Chave on the corner as well.

In 1893–1894, he restored the Église Dormition de la Mère de Dieu, a Greek Orthodox church located at 23 Rue de la Grande Armée in the 1st arrondissement of Marseille.

He also designed a building located at 15 rue Honnorat in Marseille, known as the Foyer social Honnorat or the Fondation Massabo-Zafiropulo.

== Personal life ==
He died on August 22, 1904.

== Legacy ==
His bust, sculpted by his brother, is displayed in the Art Museum of Toulon in Toulon.

== Biography ==
- Gaudensi Allar, Quelques elements d'hygiene appliques a l'habitation moderne (Samat & Company, 1903).
