= Henri-César de Castellane-Majastre =

- Born: 28 March 1733; Riez, Alpes-de-Haute-Provence, France
- Died: 5 May 1789 (aged 56); Riez, Alpes-de-Haute-Provence, France
- Occupations: Landowner; Sailor
- Employer: French Navy
- Title: Marquess

Henri-César de Castellane-Majastre (1733-1789) was a French aristocrat, landowner and Navy officer.

== Biography ==
=== Early life ===
Henri-César de Castellane-Majastre was born on 28 March 1733 in Riez, Alpes-de-Haute-Provence, France. A French aristocrat, he was a member of the House of Castellane. His father was César-Henri de Castellane (1693-1761) and his mother, Agathe de Martin.

=== Career ===
He served as a career officer in the French Navy. He became Gardes de la Marine in 1749, Lieutenant in 1762 and Captain in 1775.

Castellane-Majastre served in the American Revolutionary War, commanding the 32-gun frigate Flore in 1778. He later served in the squadron under Grasse, leaving from Brest on 22 March 1781, bound for Martinique. He served in the Invasion of Tobago on 30 May 1781. The campaign led to the capture of Cornwallis. Castellane-Majastre took part in the Battle of the Chesapeake on 5 September 1781 and the Siege of Yorktown on 19 October 1781.

Additionally, he fought in the Battle of Saint Kitts, commanding the 74-gun Marseillais in April 1782. A month later, in May 1782, he served with the fleet of Louis-Philippe de Vaudreuil (1724–1802).

In October 1782, he was inducted in the Society of the Cincinnati and received 800 pounds from them for his service. On 1 October 1784, he became Chef d'escadre.

=== Personal life ===
He married Marie Claire de Montolieu (unknown-1800). They had two sons:

- Charles de Castellane (1783-1857).
- César Elzéar de Castellane, Comte de Castellane-Majastres (1784-1835).

He died on 5 May 1789 in Riez, Alpes-de-Haute-Provence, France.

=== Legacy ===
The Place Castellane in Marseille is named in his honour.
