= Bernard Cadenat =

French politician

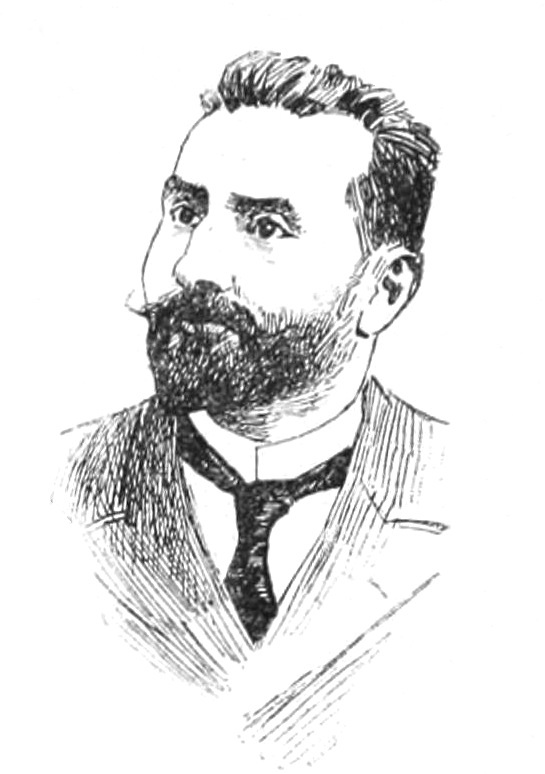

Bernard Cadenat (2 January 1853, in Pexiora – 1 August 1930) was a French politician. He joined at first the French Workers' Party (POF), which in 1902 merged into the Socialist Party of France (PSdF), which in turn merged into the French Section of the Workers' International (SFIO) in 1905. Cadenat was a member of the Chamber of Deputies from 1898 to 1919 and from 1924 to 1930. He was the mayor of Marseille from 1910 to 1912.
