= Saint-Vincent-de-Paul, Marseille =

Coordinates: 43.2988°N 5.3859°E

Église Saint-Vincent-de-Paul
- Église Saint-Vincent-de-Paul
- Location: 8 cours Franklin Roosevelt; Marseille 13001; Bouches-du-Rhône, Provence-Alpes-Côte d'Azur
- Country: France
- Denomination: Roman Catholic Church

History
- Dedicated: 1886

Architecture
- Architect: François Reybaud
- Architectural type: church
- Style: Gothic

Administration
- Diocese: Roman Catholic Archdiocese of Marseille

Clergy
- Priest: Philippe Rochas

The Église Saint-Vincent-de-Paul (French pronunciation: [eɡliz sɛ̃ vɛ̃sɑ̃ də pɔl]) is a Roman Catholic church in Marseille, France.

== Location ==
It is located off the top of the Canebière, in the Thiers district. The exact address is 2-3 Cours Franklin Roosevelt, an avenue named for American President Franklin D. Roosevelt (1882–1945).

== History ==
It was built on a demolished convent and chapel of Reformed Augustinians, which explains why it is commonly known as "Les Réformés" despite being a Roman Catholic church. The church building itself was designed by the architect François Reybaud and the abbey Joseph-Guillaume Pougnet, and built from 1855 to 1886. It is neogothic, with ogival curbs in the ceiling. The architects took inspiration from the Reims Cathedral and the Amiens Cathedral. The two arrows are 70 metres high.

The bronze gates were designed by Caras-Latour, the high altar was designed by Jules Cantini (1826-1916), and the stained windows were designed by Édouard Didron (1836-1902). Additionally, sculptor Louis Botinelly (1883-1962) designed the statues of Joan of Arc and of Jesus. As for the organ pipes, they were made by Joseph Merklin (1819–1905).

In the 1980s, due to low attendance, it came under the threat of being demolished. However, in recent years, it has achieved record levels of mass attendance.

== At present ==
The church building is open every day from 09.00 to 12.00 and from 13.00 to 16.30, except on Sundays. Mass is every weekday at 18.30. On Tuesday, Thursday and Saturday it is also celebrated at 12:10. On Sunday mass is said at 10:30. On the last Sunday of November, Mass is said in Provençal dialect to celebrate the santon traditionally used in Christmas cribs in houses in Provence.

The current priest is Fr. Philippe Rochas

== Gallery ==
Église Saint-Vincent-de-Paul
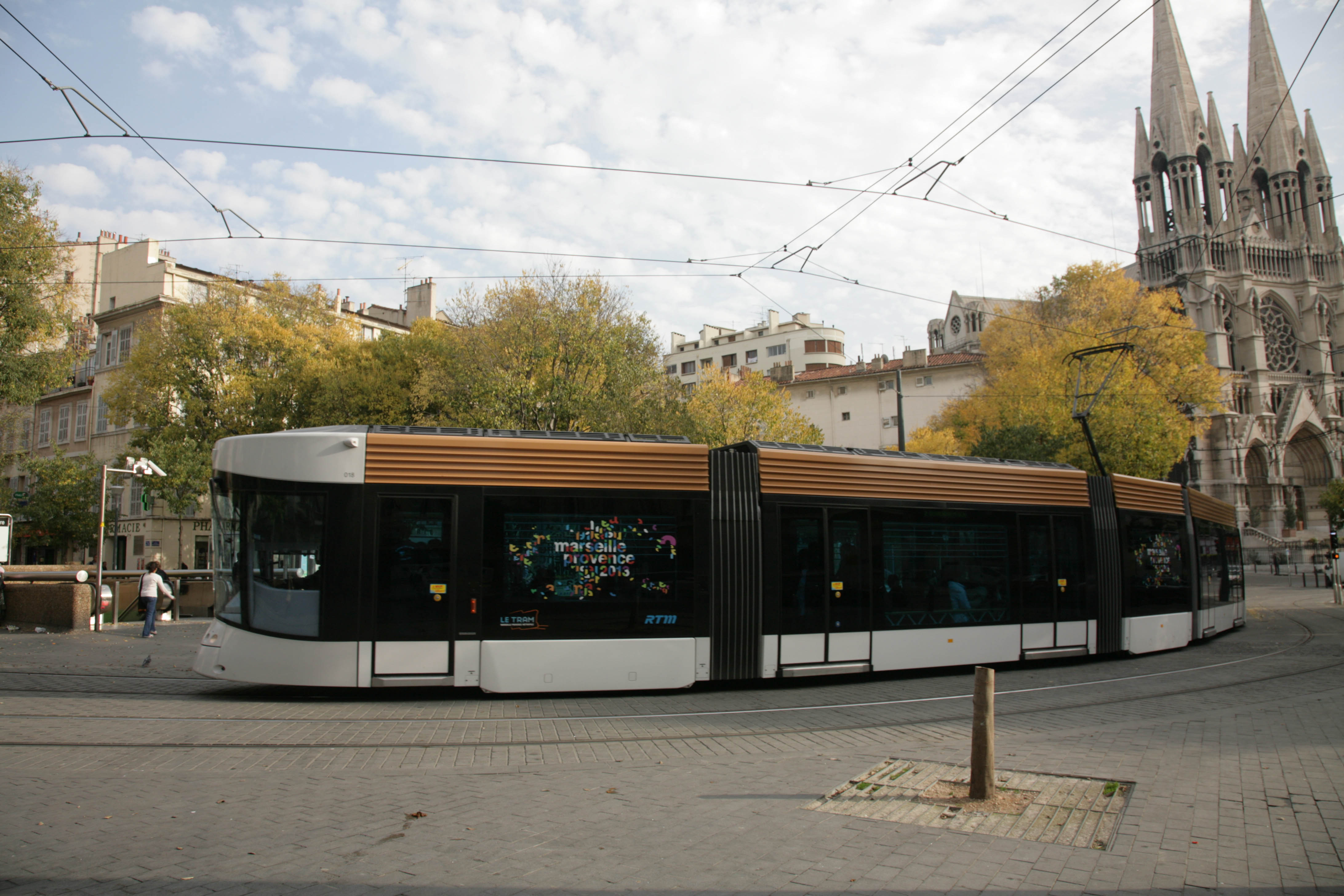
Église Saint-Vincent-de-Paul and the tram

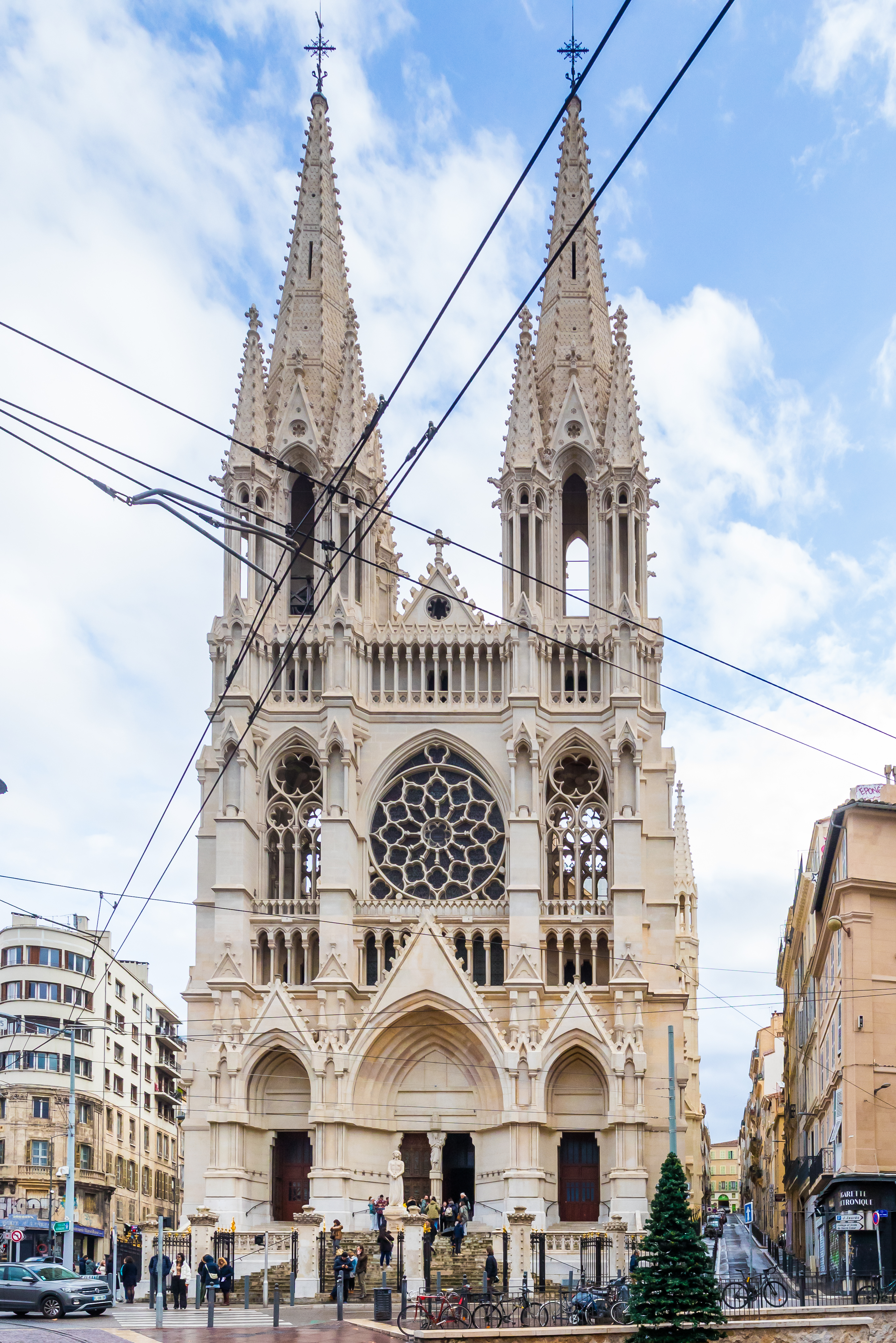
Église Saint-Vincent-de-Paul from a distance

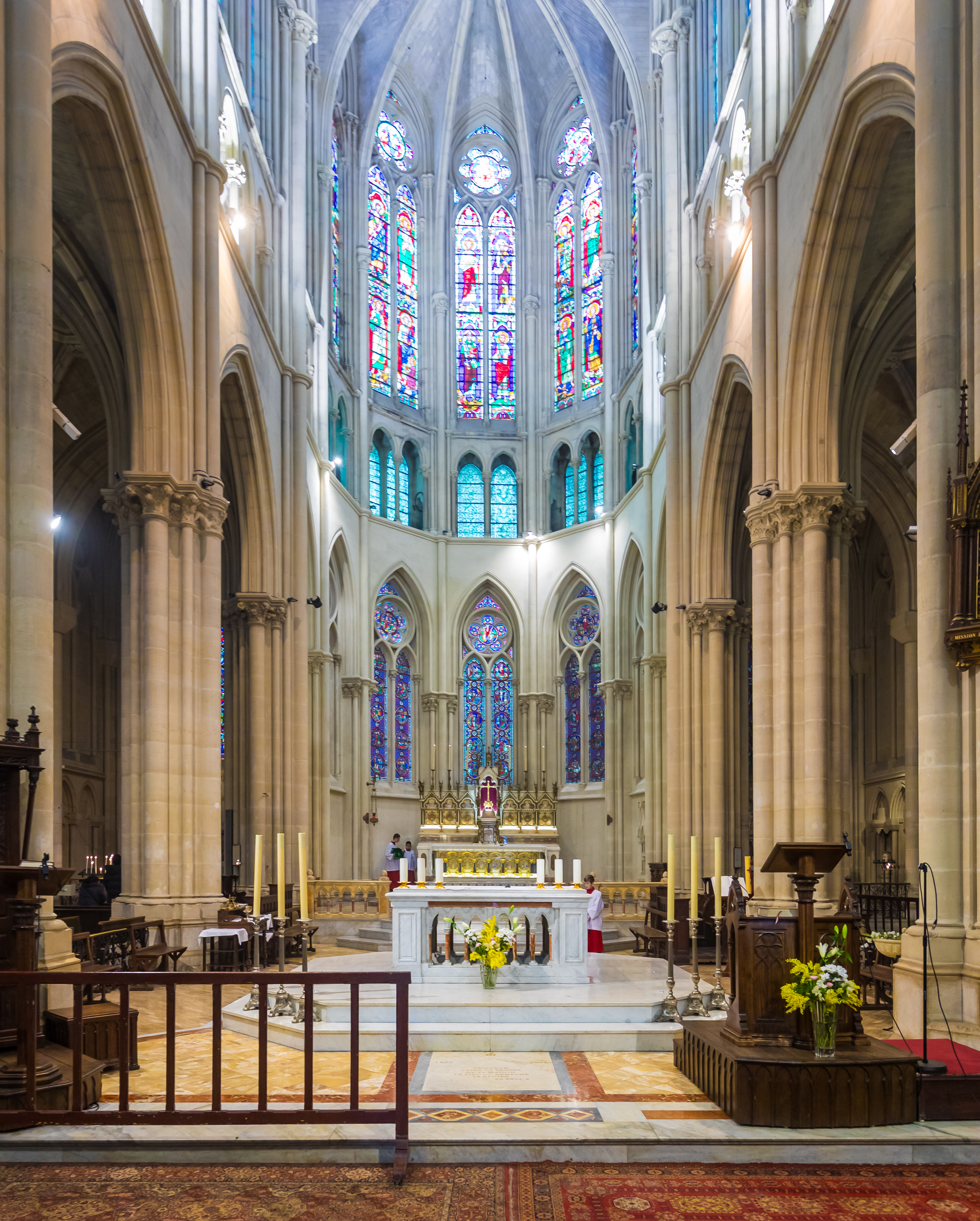
Inside the Église Saint-Vincent-de-Paul

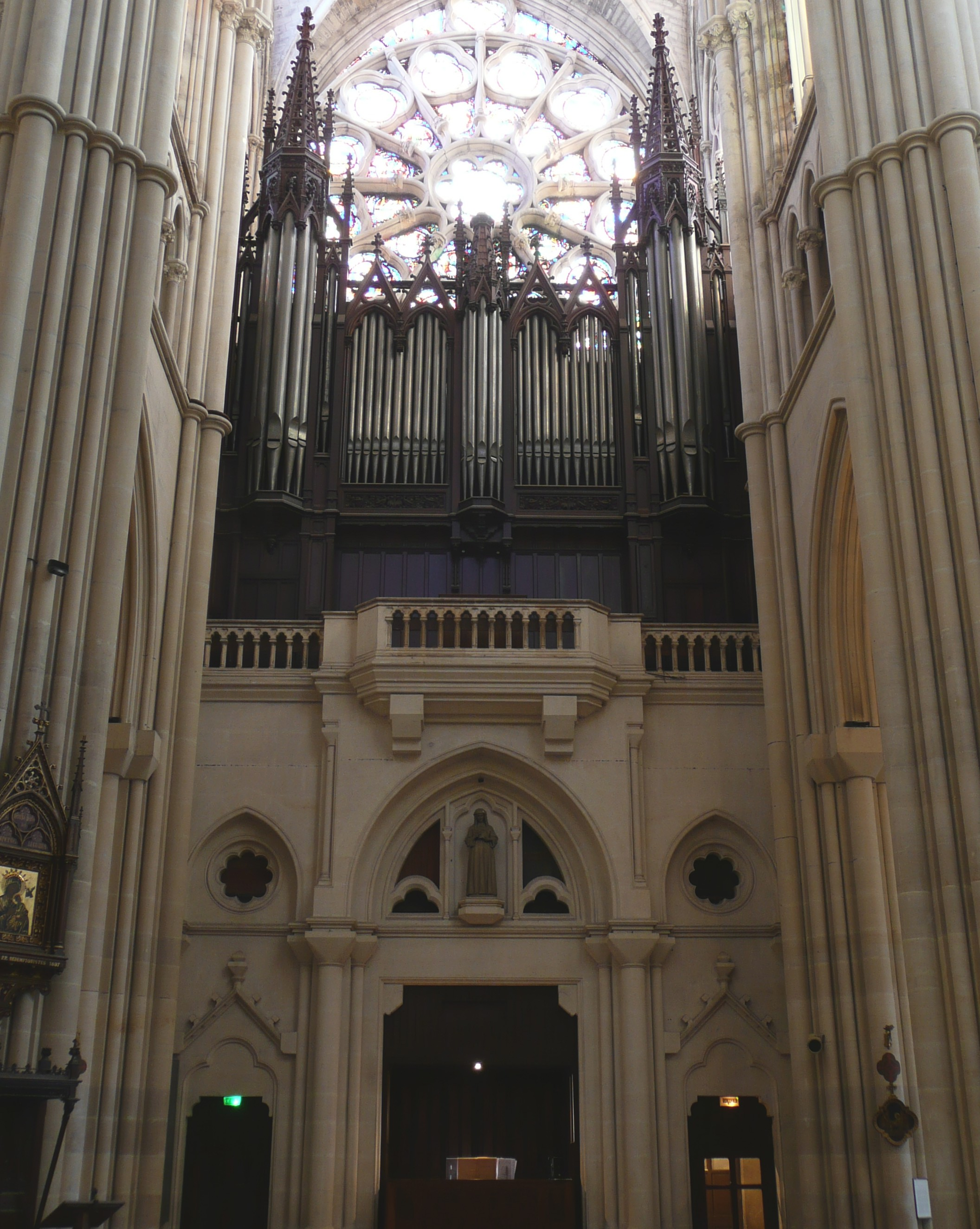
Pipe organs made by Joseph Merklin inside the Église Saint-Vincent-de-Paul

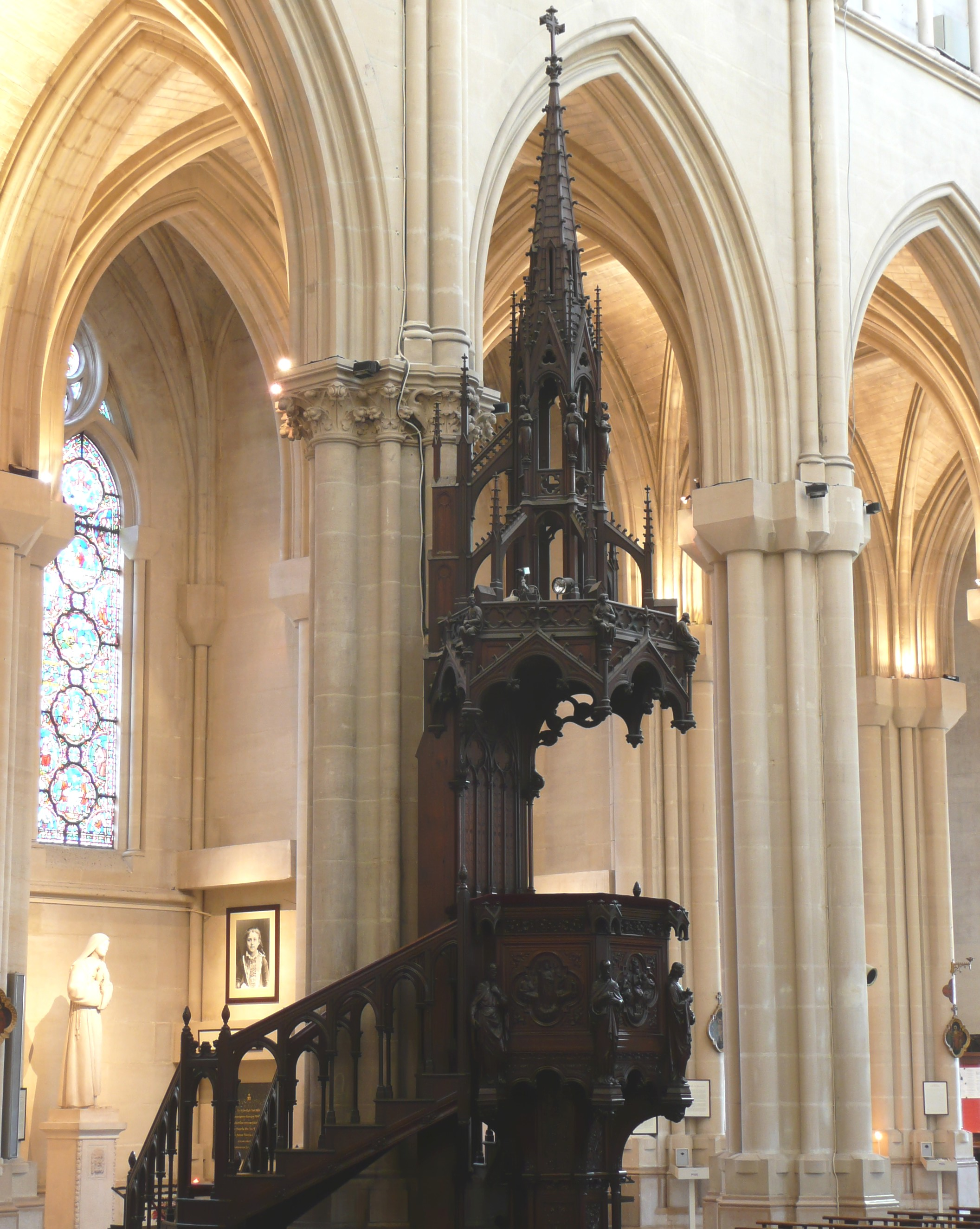
Pulpit inside the Église Saint-Vincent-de-Paul

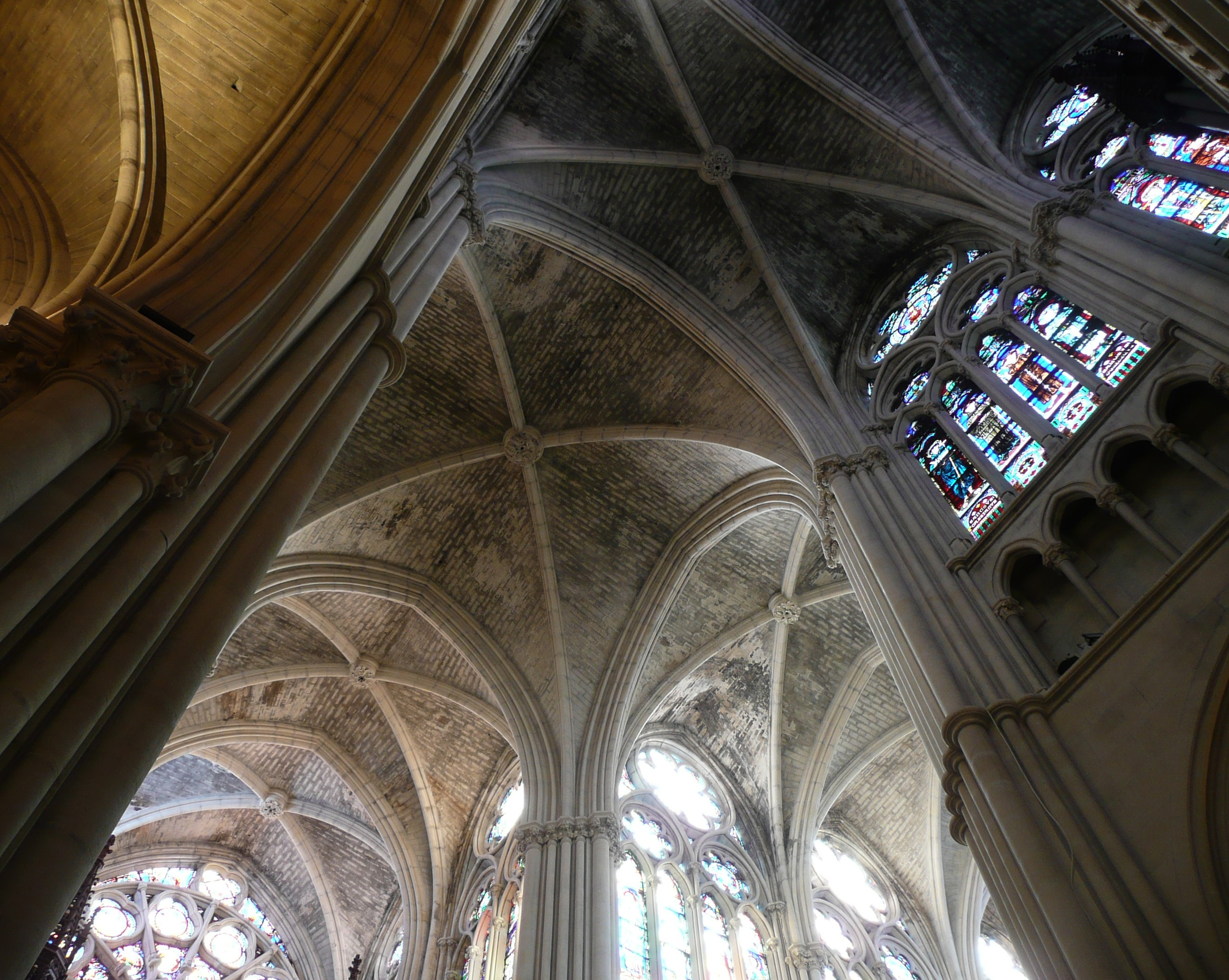
Ceiling inside the Église Saint-Vincent-de-Paul

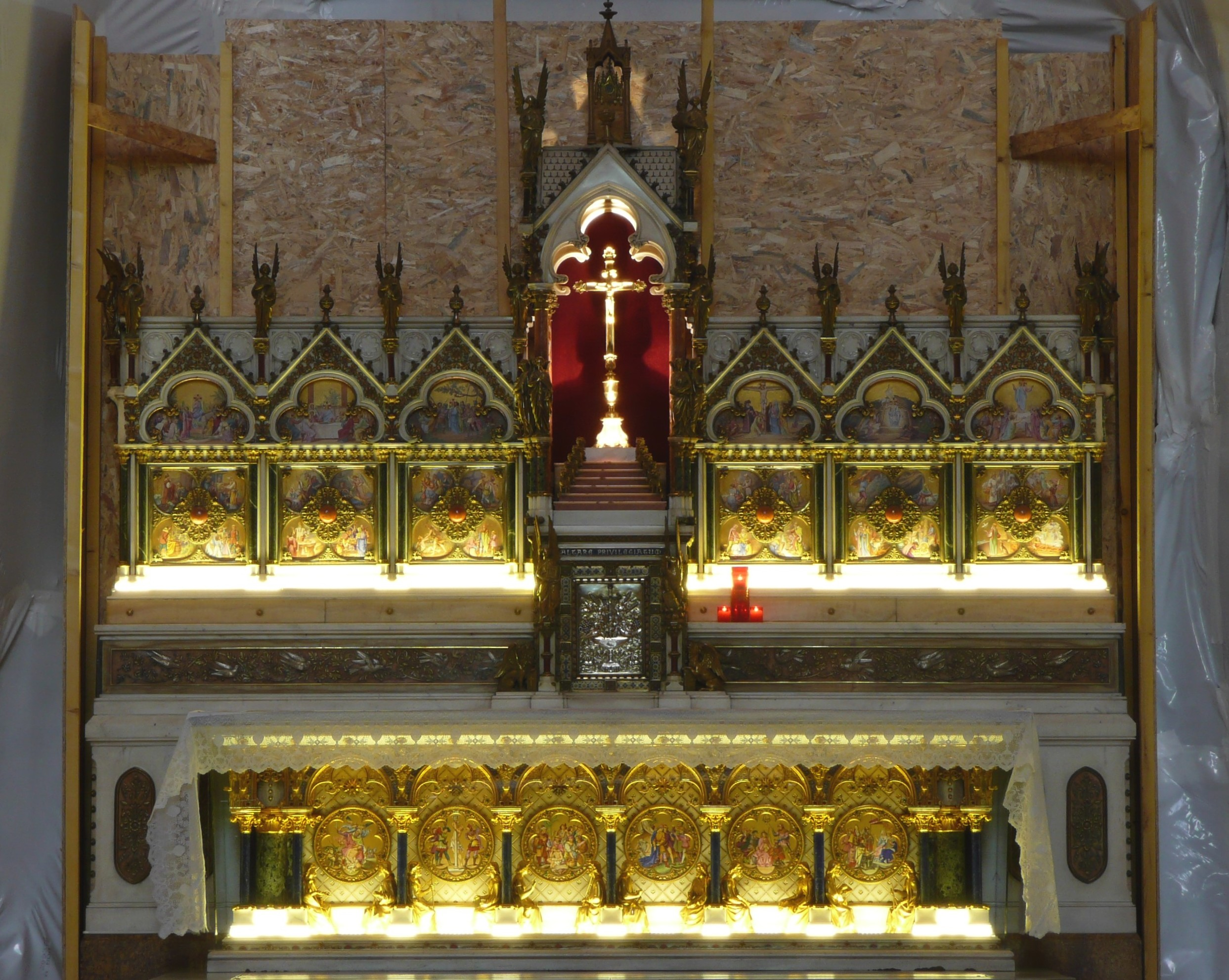
High altar by Jules Cantini inside the Église Saint-Vincent-de-Paul

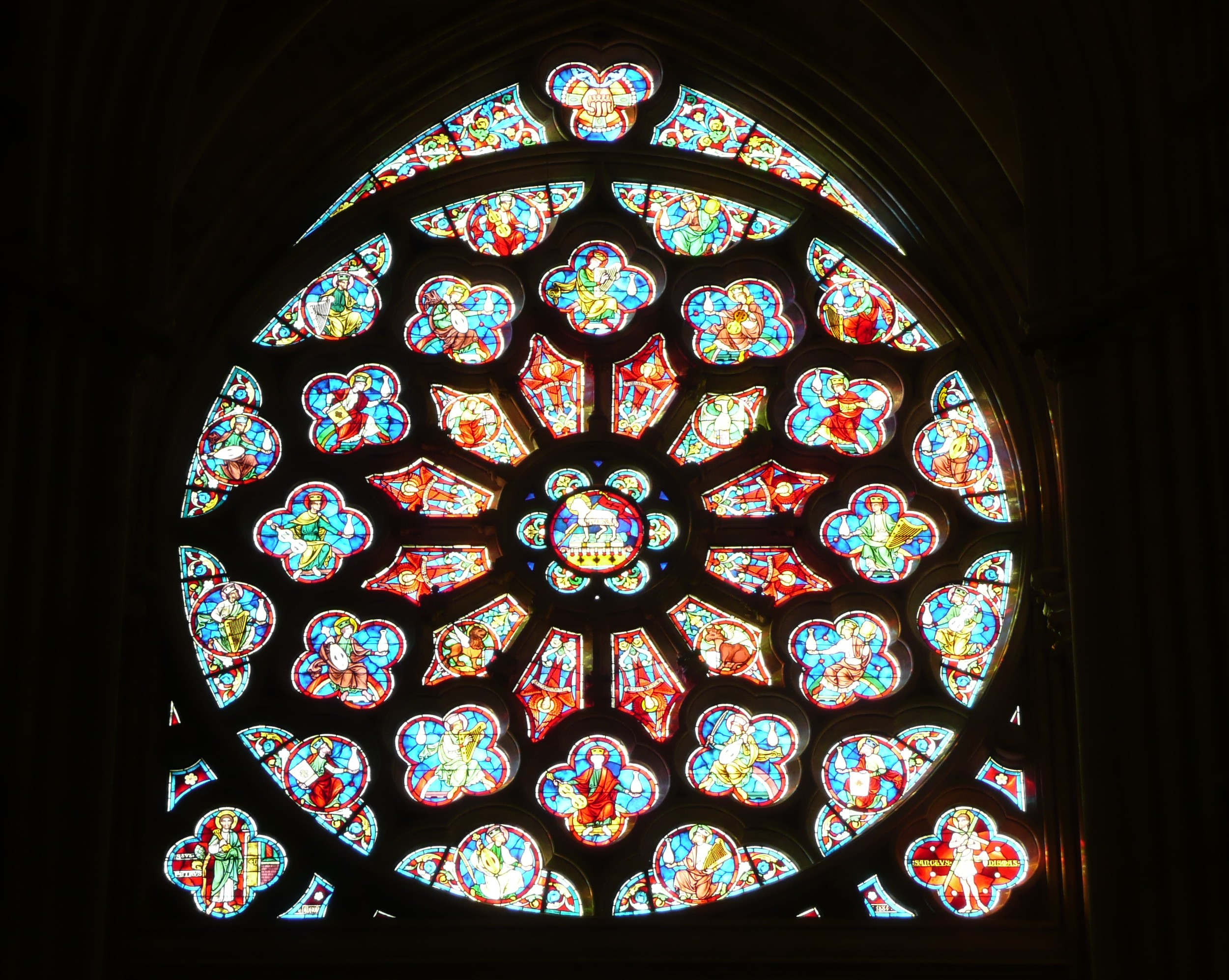
Stained glass inside the Église Saint-Vincent-de-Paul

== Secondary sources ==
- Antoine Ricard, Église Saint-Vincent-de-Paul à Marseille (impr. Vve P. Chauffard, 1867, 21 pages).
- Félix Vérany, Les Augustins réformés et l'église Saint-Vincent-de-Paul de Marseille (J. Chauffard, 1885, 288 pages).
