= André-Joseph Allar =

French sculptor

- Born: 22 August 1845; Toulon, Var, Provence-Alpes-Côte d'Azur, France
- Died: 11 April 1926 (aged 80); Toulon, Var, Provence-Alpes-Côte d'Azur, France
- Occupation: Sculptor
- Relatives: Gaudensi Allar (brother)

André-Joseph Allar (22 August 1845 – 11 April 1926) was a French sculptor.

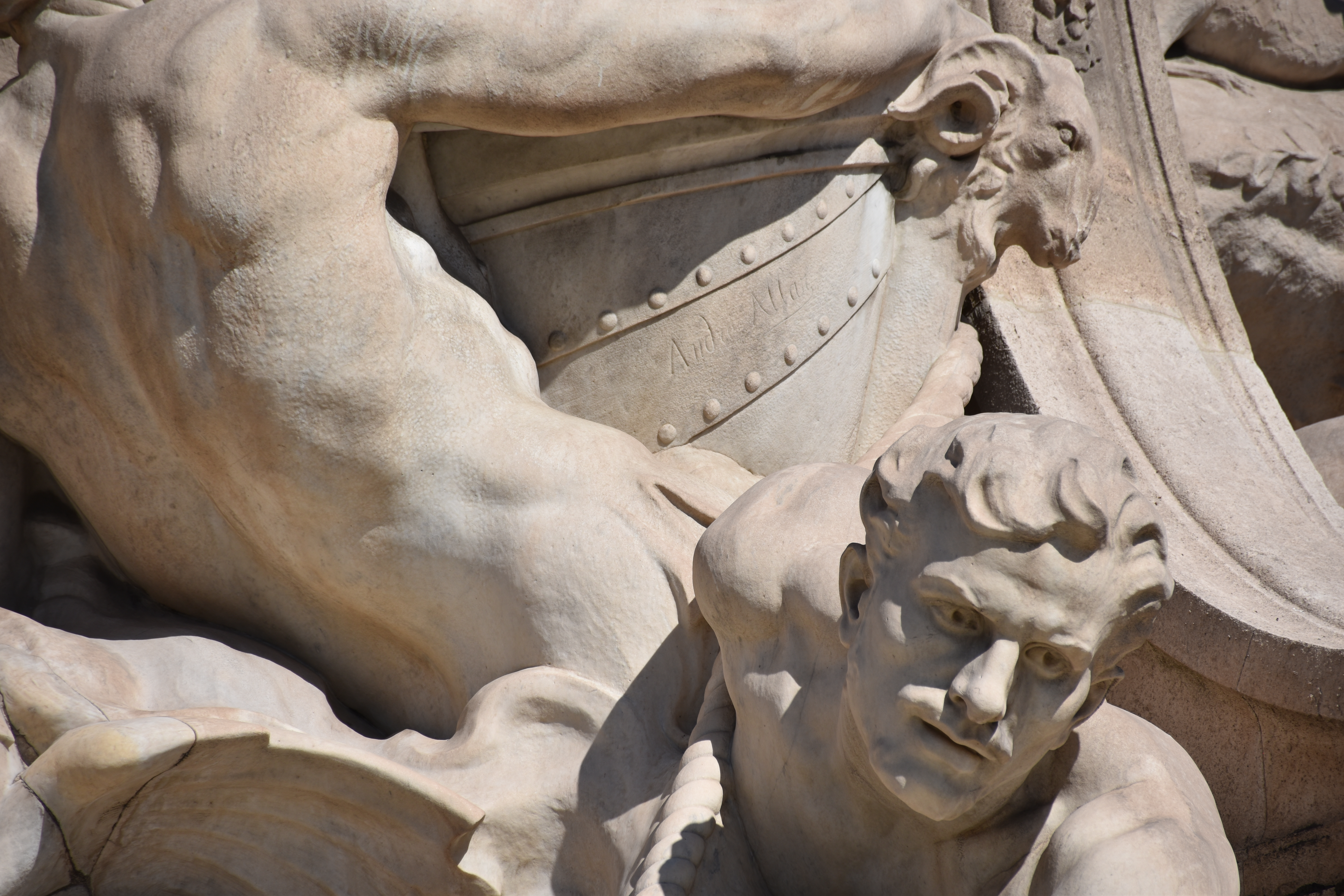
Artist's signature on The Sea - Amphitrite from the Cantini Fountaiin, Marseille

== Biography ==
André-Joseph Allar was born in Toulon on 22 August 1845.

He became a successful sculptor after training under Antoine Laurent Dantan and Pierre-Jules Cavelier. Allar is best known for his small-scale work and architectural designs with majority of his work situated at the local museum in Toulon, including 'Hercules finding his dead son'. His artworks on Hercules is evidently inspired by the Greek hero, but in particular, the stories that depict the character as a saviour. His architectural features include his works in the Palacio Legislativo Federal with Laurent Marqueste and in the Palacio de Bellas Artes in Mexico City. Another one of his famous works is the statue of law displayed on the façade Palace of Justice, Rome.

In addition to his career as an artist, Allar joined the Legion of Honour as an officer in 1896 and the French Institute in 1905. He won various prizes but most notably the Prix de Rome in 1869 for his sculpture, and later became a member of the Académie des Beaux-Arts on 20 May 1905.

He died in Toulon on 11 April 1926. A street in Marseille has been named in his honor.

== Main works ==
- Hécube découvrant le cadavre de Polydore, musée des Beaux-Arts à Marseille
- La mort d’Alceste, inspired by his wife's death, Lisieux
- Enfant des Abruzzes, musée d'Orsay
- Thétis portant les armes d’Achille
- Buste de Montricher, gallery of the palais Longchamp in Marseille
- Sainte Madeleine on the facade of the Cathedral de la Major in Marseille
- Monument de la Fédération on the place de la République in Toulon.
- Fontaine de la place Estrangin, Marseille
- Fontaine de la place Castellane, Marseille, in collaboration with Jules Cantini
- Portrait de son frère Gaudensi, museum of Toulon
- Statues de Jean Bullant et de Jean Goujon, on the front of the Mairie de Paris
- Statue de Frédéric Le Play, Jardin du Luxembourg, Paris
- The Youth and The Virile Age sculptures in the Palacio de Bellas Artes in Mexico City, Mexico
- Monument du Centenaire, Nice

== Gallery ==
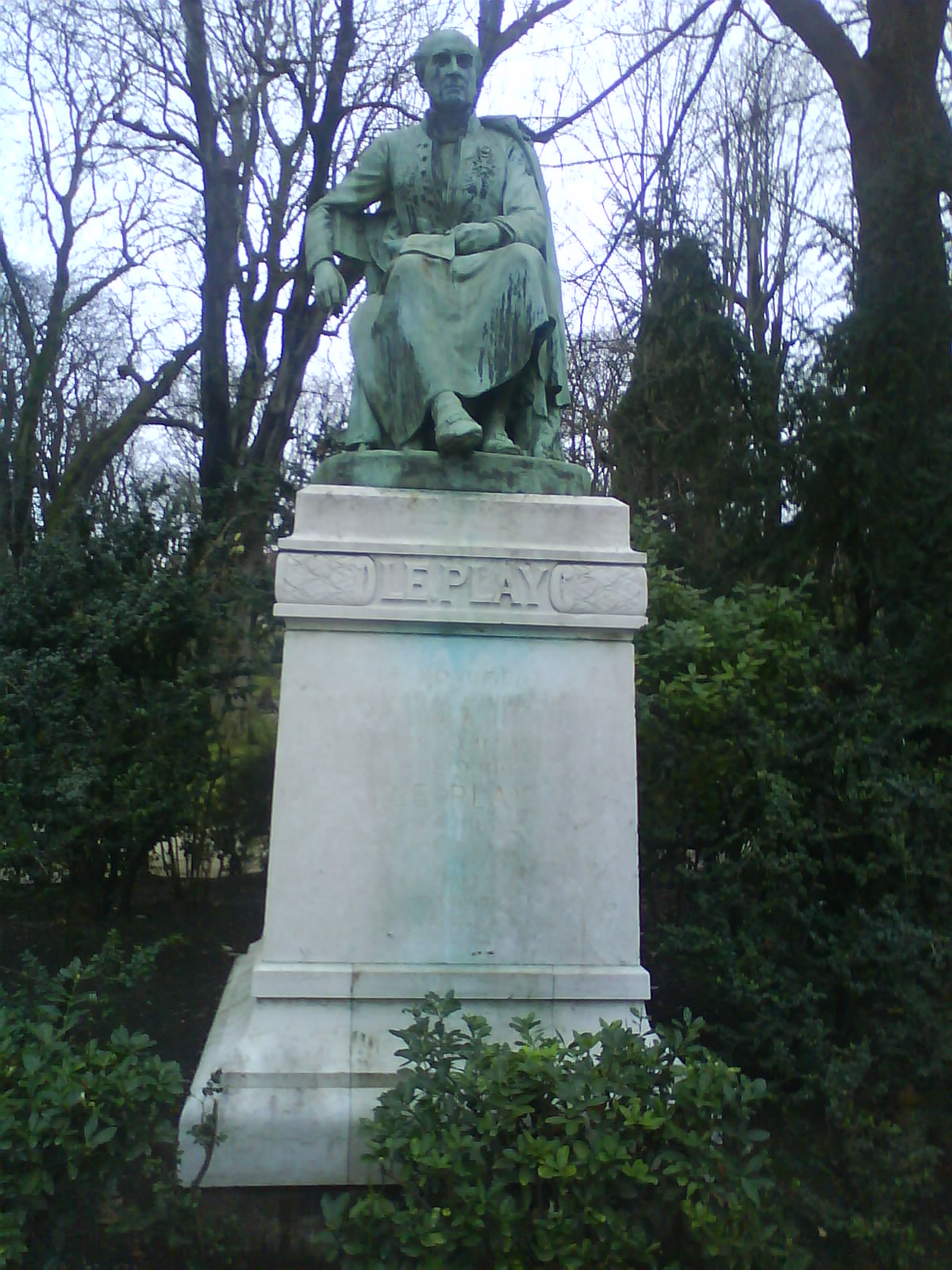
Frédéric Le Play
Jardin du Luxembourg

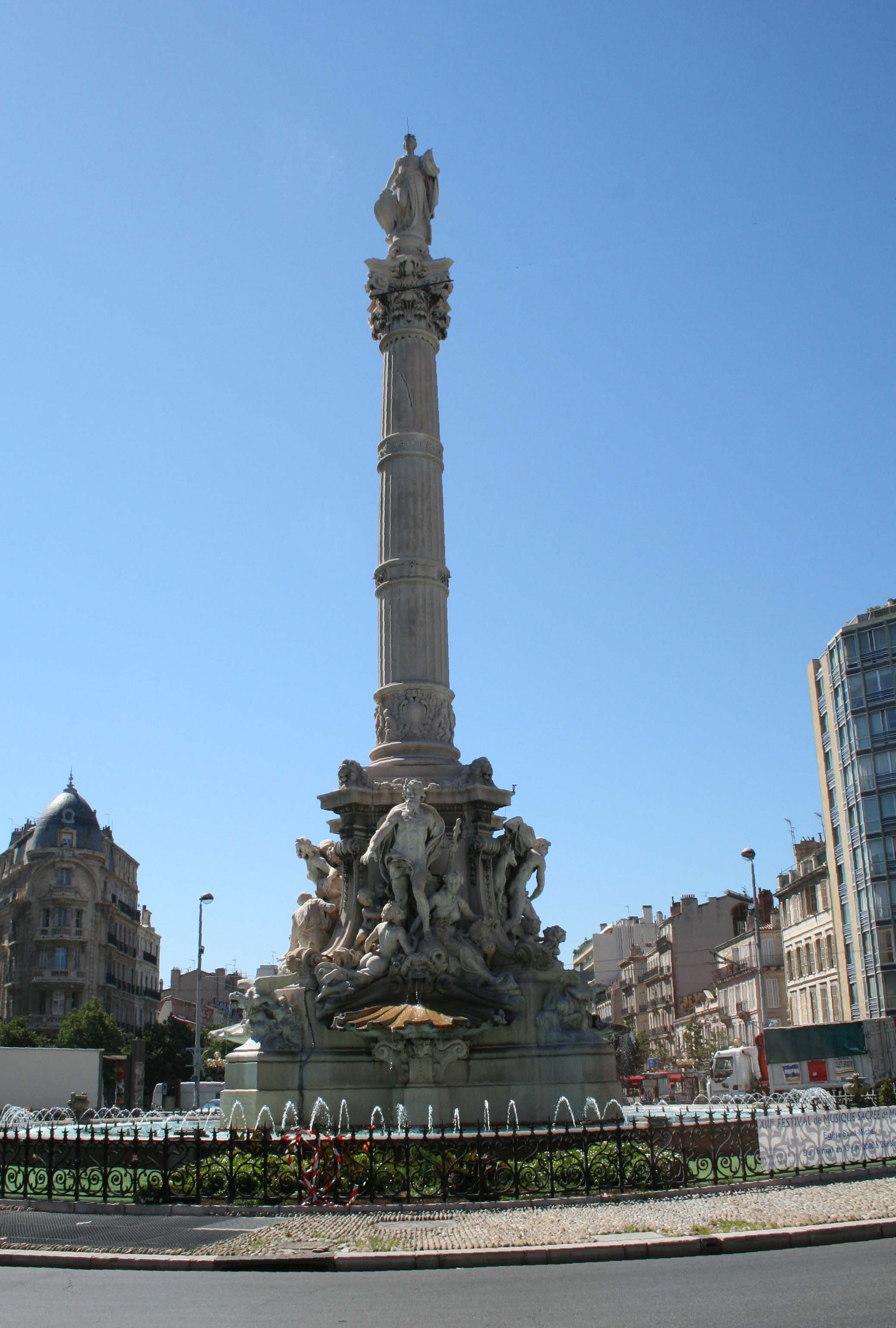
Fontaine
Place Castellane

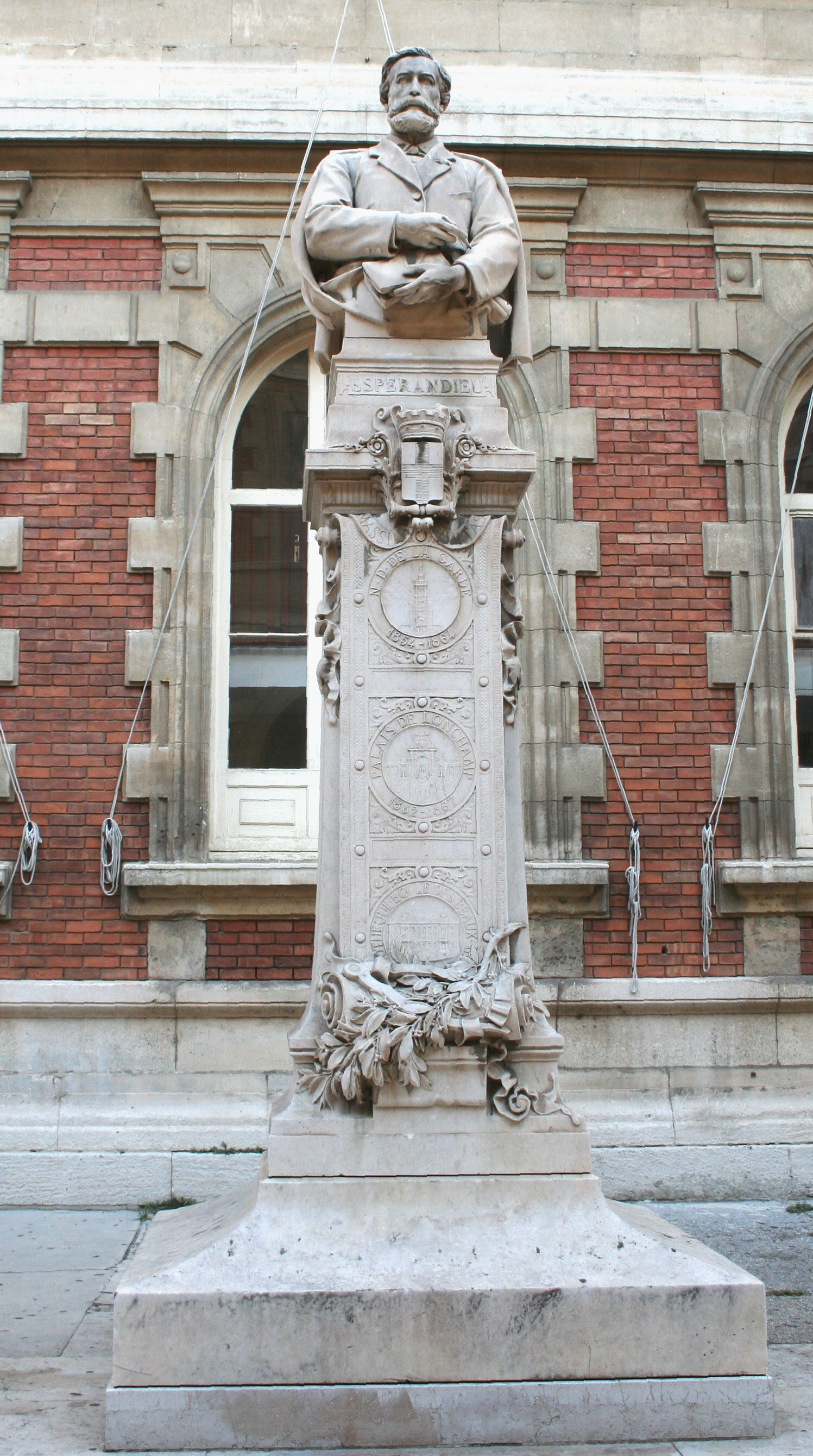
Henri-Jacques Espérandieu
architect

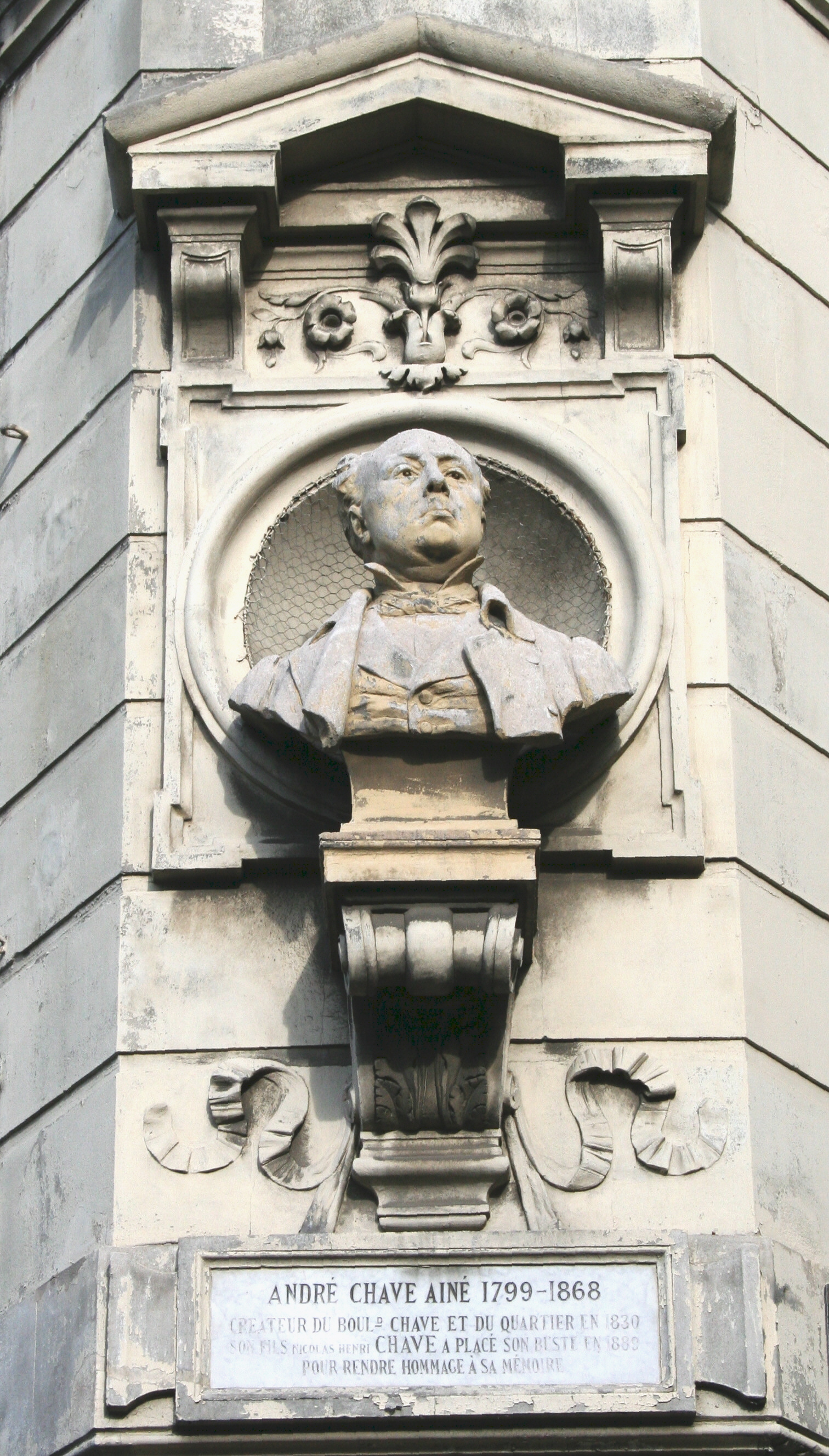
Bust of André Chave

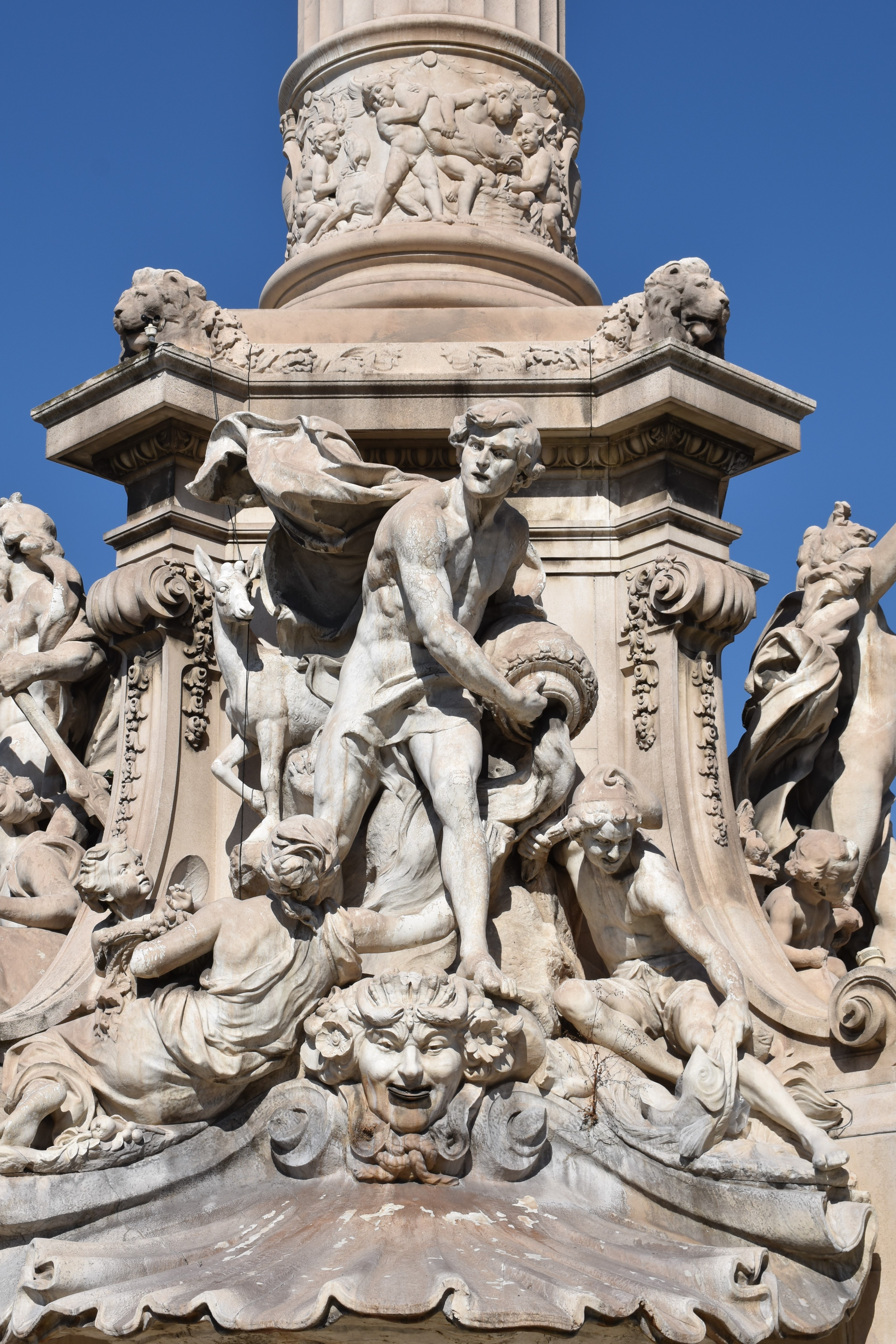
The Torrent from the Cantini Fountain (1911), place Castellane, Marseille

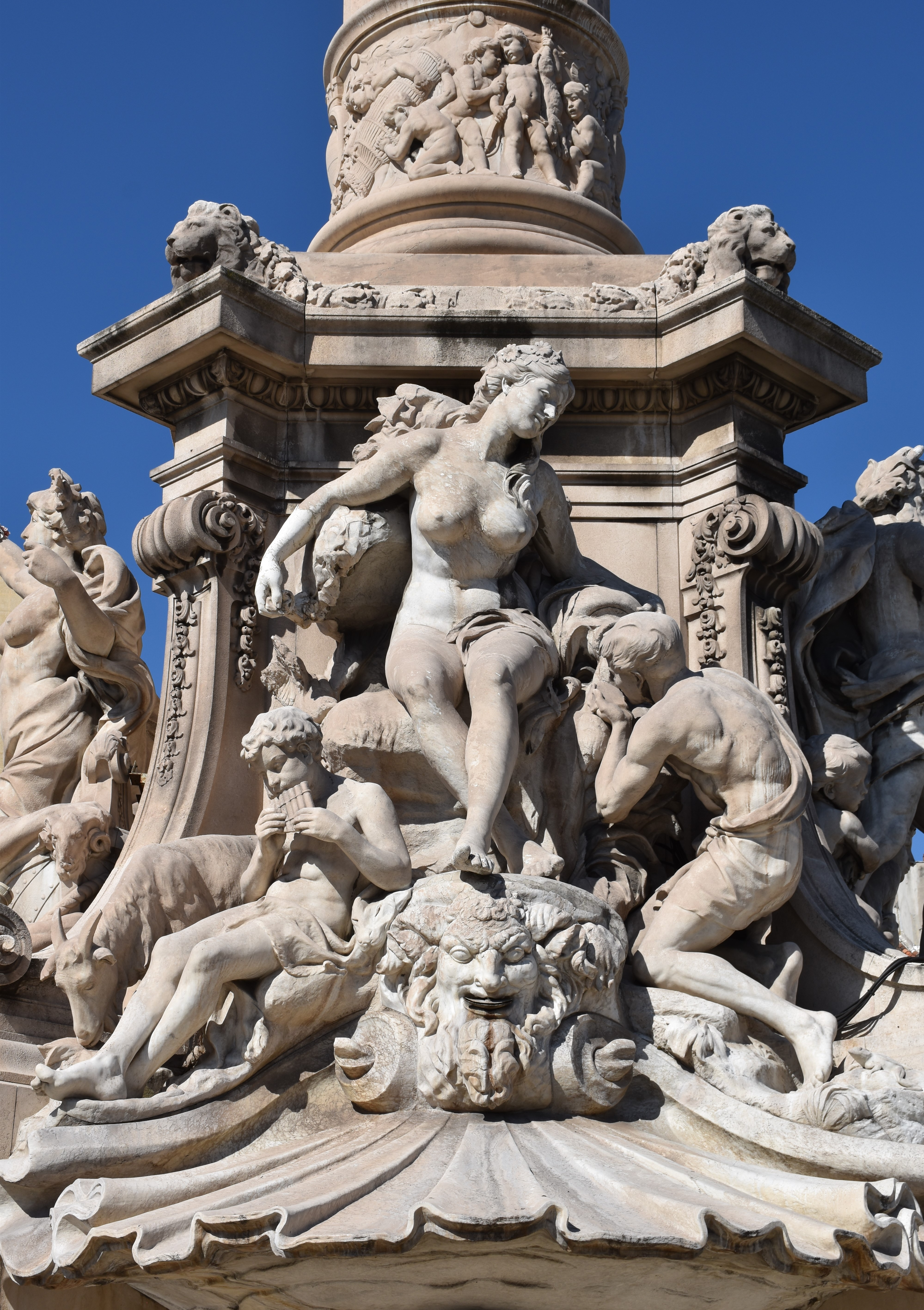
The Source from the Cantini Fountain (1911), place Castellane, Marseille

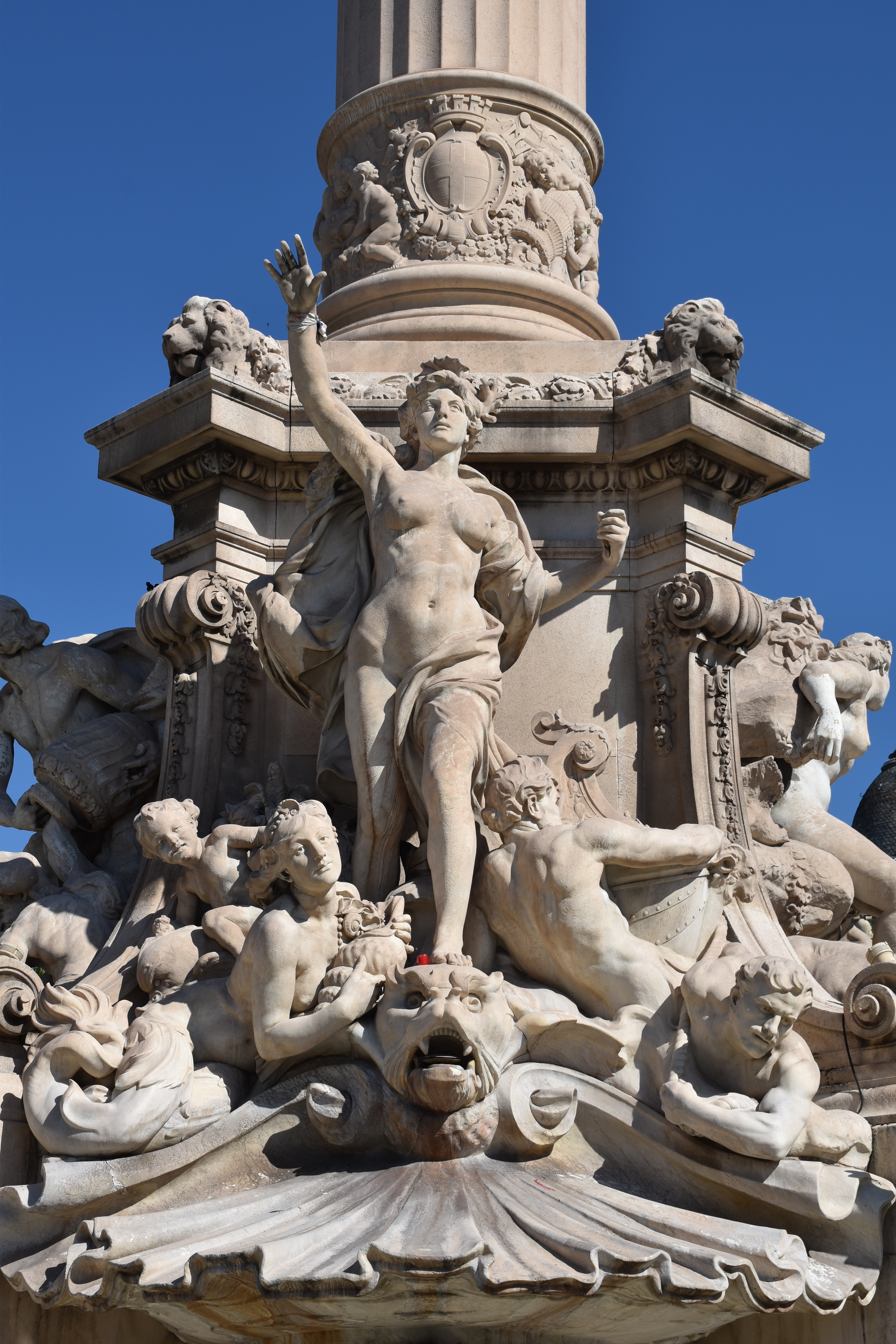
The Sea - Amphitrite from the Cantini Fountain (1911), place Castellane, Marseille

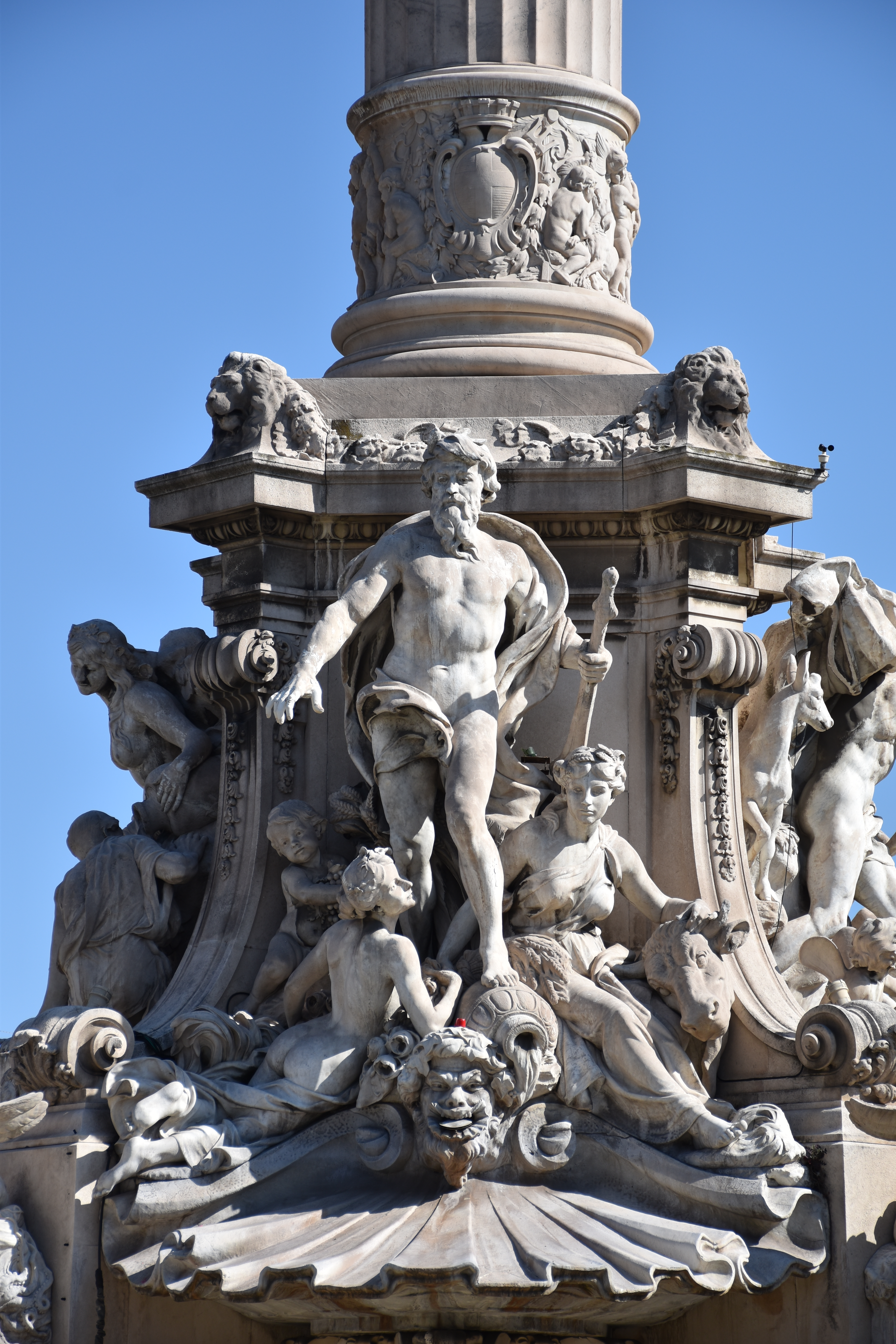
The Rhône from the Cantini Fountain (1911), place Castellane, Marseille
