= Marseille-Blancarde station =

French railway station

Marseille-Blancarde
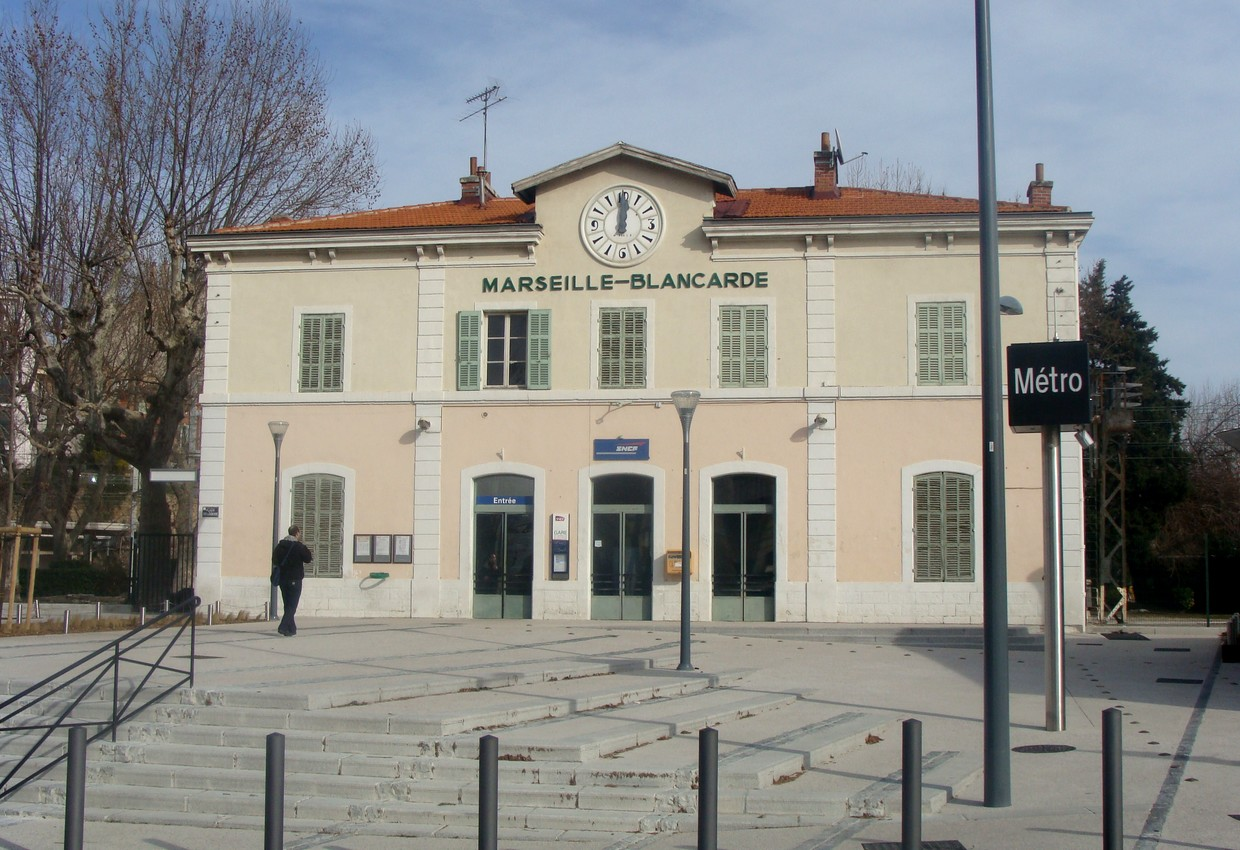

General information
- Location: Place de la Gare de la Blancarde; 13005 Marseille; Bouches-du-Rhône, France
- Coordinates: 43.2962°N 5.4065°E
- Elevation: 50 m (160 ft)
- Owner: SNCF
- Operator: SNCF
- Lines: Marseille–Ventimiglia railway Marseille-Blancarde–Marseille-Prado railway
- Platforms: 5
- Tracks: 6 + service tracks

Other information
- Station code: 87751081

Passengers
- 2018: 424,347

Services
Preceding station	SNCF	Following station
Paris-Austerlitz Terminus	Intercités (night)	Toulon towards Nice-Ville
Preceding station	TER PACA	Following station
Marseille-Saint-Charles Terminus	1	La Pomme towards Hyères
Location

Marseille-Blancarde (French: Gare de Marseille-Blancarde; Occitan: Estacion de Marselha-Blancarda) is a French railway station located in the city of Marseille (district of La Blancarde), in the Bouches-du-Rhône department in the Provence-Alpes-Côte d'Azur region. It is also a station on Line 1 of the Marseille Metro.

From 2009, the station was the subject of improvement works in the redevelopment of the line between Blancarde and Aubagne. Signaling work is being done around the station to modernise the infrastructure on the route leading to the Gare de Marseille-Saint-Charles. Most of the civil engineering work in this area is concentrated upstream between the station and that of La Pomme.

== Train services ==
- Night services Paris - Marseille - Nice
- Regional services (TER Provence-Alpes-Côte-d'Azur 1) Marseille ... Toulon ... Hyères
