= 1st arrondissement of Marseille =

- Municipal arrondissement
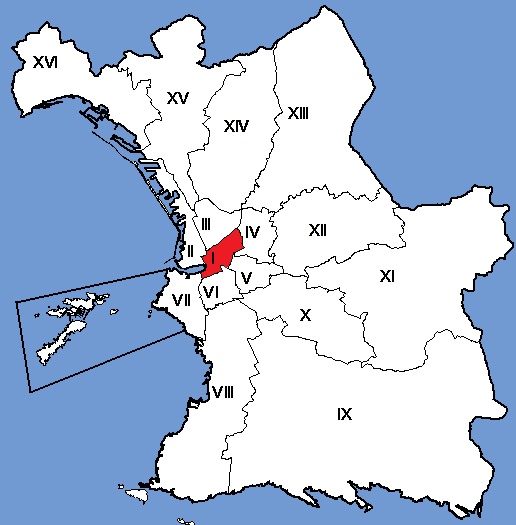
- Location within Marseille
- Interactive map of 1st arrondissement of Marseille
- Coordinates: 43.2976°N 5.3810°E
- Country: France
- Region: Provence-Alpes-Côte d'Azur
- Department: Bouches-du-Rhône
- Commune: Marseille

Government
  - Mayor (2020–2026): Sophie Camard (FI)
- Area: 1.778 km^{2} (0.686 sq mi)
- Population (2023): 37,599
  - Density: 21,150/km^{2} (54,770/sq mi)
- INSEE code: 13201

The 1st arrondissement of Marseille is one of the 16 arrondissements of Marseille. It covers part of the city centre of Marseille. It is governed locally together with the 7th arrondissement, with which it forms the 1st sector of Marseille.

== Population ==
Historical population
Year	Pop.	±% p.a.
1968	51,419	—
1975	46,247	−1.50%
1982	44,673	−0.49%
1990	35,524	−2.82%
1999	37,750	+0.68%
2007	40,919	+1.01%
2012	38,972	−0.97%
2017	39,786	+0.41%
2023	37,599	−0.94%
Source: INSEE

Neighbourhood	Population (2022)
Belsunce	8,825
Chapitre	6,497
Noailles	4,304
Opéra	5,468
Saint-Charles	8,390
Thiers	4,995

- Unemployment rate, as of 8/3/1999

Area	Workers	Number of unemployed	Unemployment rate
Belsunce	3 286	1 610	49,00%
Chapitre	3 095	924	29,85%
Noailles	2 051	908	44,27%
Opéra	1 952	589	30,17%
Saint-Charles	3 739	756	20,22%
Thiers	2 289	695	30,36%
Arrondissement	16 412	5 482	33,40%
Total Marseille	336 009	78 288	23,30%

- Dwellings in areas as of 8/3/1999

Neighbourhood	% Tenants	% Buildings	% 4 or more rooms
Belsunce	86,24%	83,80%	18,05%
Chapitre	59,90%	95,58%	29,59%
Noailles	77,64%	92,07%	25,61%
Opéra	73,39%	92,25%	27,29%
Saint-Charles	55,90%	97,01%	26,56%
Thiers	61,73%	88,18%	21,53%
Arrondissement	68,69%	91,55%	21,52%
Total Marseille	51,73%	82,86%	38,21%

- Population of neighbourhoods by age 8/3/1999

Neighbourhood	% 0-19	% 20-39	% 40-59	% 60-74	% 75 +
Belsunce	26,11%	27,01%	24,76%	15,81%	6,31%
Chapitre	21,11%	32,50%	26,06%	12,28%	8,05%
Noailles	25,19%	36,61%	24,03%	9,30%	4,88%
Opéra	16,32%	39,92%	23,46%	11,36%	8,95%
Saint-Charles	19,75%	33,55%	24,61%	12,40%	6,68%
Thiers	20,73%	34,15%	27,27%	10,46%	7,39%
Arrondissement	21,90%	32,98%	25,08%	12,42%	7,62%
Total Marseille	23,16%	28,67%	24,84%	14,18%	9,16%
