= List of Marseille Metro stations =

Map of the Marseille Metro network

The following is the list of the Marseille Metro stations in Marseille, France. As of 2020 there are 29 stations in the Marseille Metro system, for a total of 22.3 kilometres (13.9 mi) of route.

== List ==
=== Line 1 ===
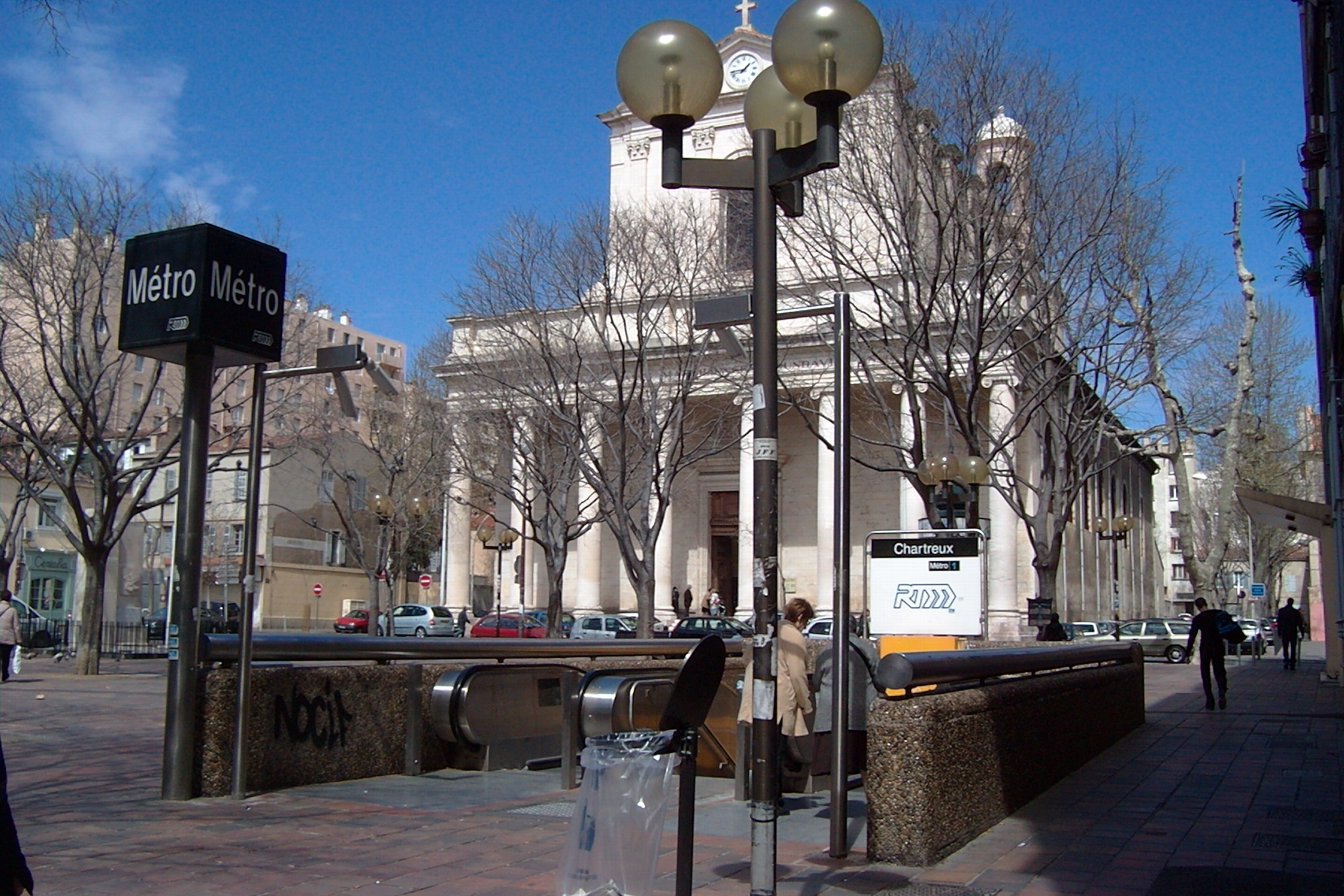
Chartreux Metro station

Line 1 of the Marseille Metro currently serves 18 stations and has a route length of 12.7 kilometres (7.9 mi). It was inaugurated in 1977, becoming the first French metro line to enter in service outside Paris after Lyon (1974). It was later extended in 1978, 1992 and 2010.

- La Fourragère
- Saint-Barnabé
- Louis Armand
- La Blancarde (transfer: Tram T1, Tram T2, SNCF station)
- La Timone
- Baille
- Castellane (transfer: Tram T3, Metro M2)
- Estrangin - Préfecture
- Vieux-Port - Hôtel de Ville
- Colbert - Hôtel de Région
- Saint-Charles (transfer: Metro M2, SNCF main station)
- Réformés - Canebière (transfer: Tram T2)
- Cinq-Avenues - Longchamp (transfer: Tram T2)
- Chartreux
- Saint-Just - Hôtel de Département
- Malpassé
- Frais Vallon
- La Rose

=== Line 2 ===
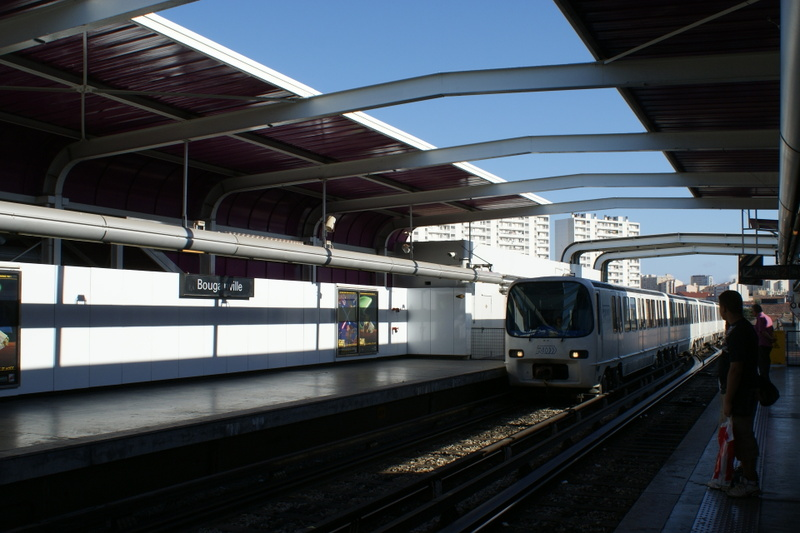
Bougainville Metro station

Opened in three stages between 1984 and 1987, Line 2 of the Marseille Metro currently serves 13 stations and has a route length of 9.6 kilometres (6.0 mi). Am extension of the Line 2 north of Bougainville, to a new terminus station at Gèze, opened in December 2019.

- Gèze
- Bougainville
- National
- Désirée Clary
- Joliette (transfer: Tram T2, Tram T3)
- Jules Guesde
- Saint-Charles (transfer: Metro M1, SNCF main station)
- Noailles (transfer: Tram T1, Tram T2)
- Notre-Dame-du-Mont - Cours Julien
- Castellane (transfer: Tram T3, Metro M1)
- Périer
- Rond-Point du Prado
- Sainte-Marguerite Dromel

== See also ==
- Marseille Metro
- Marseille tramway
- List of metro systems
