= Aubagne station =

Railway station in France

Aubagne
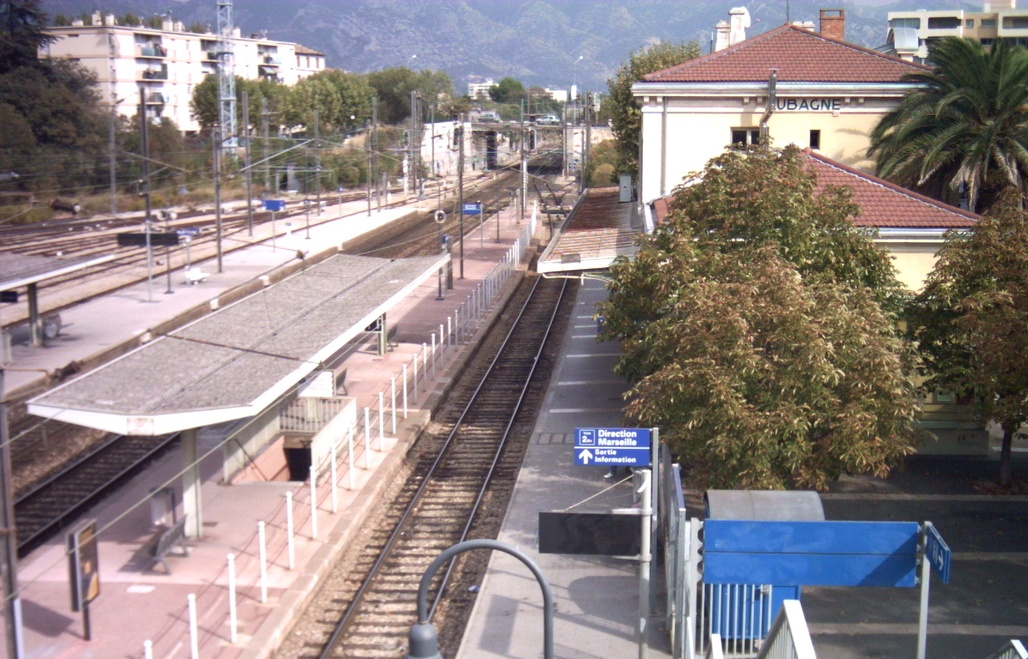

General information
- Location: Aubagne, Bouches-du-Rhône, France
- Coordinates: 43°17′46″N 5°33′59″E
- Line: Marseille–Ventimiglia railway

Other information
- Station code: 87751750

Passengers
- 2024: 1,160,401

Services
Preceding station	TER PACA	Following station
La Penne-sur-Huveaune towards Marseille	1	Cassis towards Hyères
Location

Aubagne station (French: Gare d'Aubagne) is a railway station serving the town of Aubagne, Bouches-du-Rhône department, southeastern France. It is situated on the Marseille–Ventimiglia railway. The station is served by regional trains (TER Provence-Alpes-Côte d'Azur) to Marseille and Toulon.

The station will be the centre of a planned tram network. The first line is complete and runs from the station to Le Charrel. A second line to Auriol and La Bouilladisse, named Val’Tram, is scheduled for operation in 2025.
