= Aubagne tramway =

Public transport system in Aubagne, France

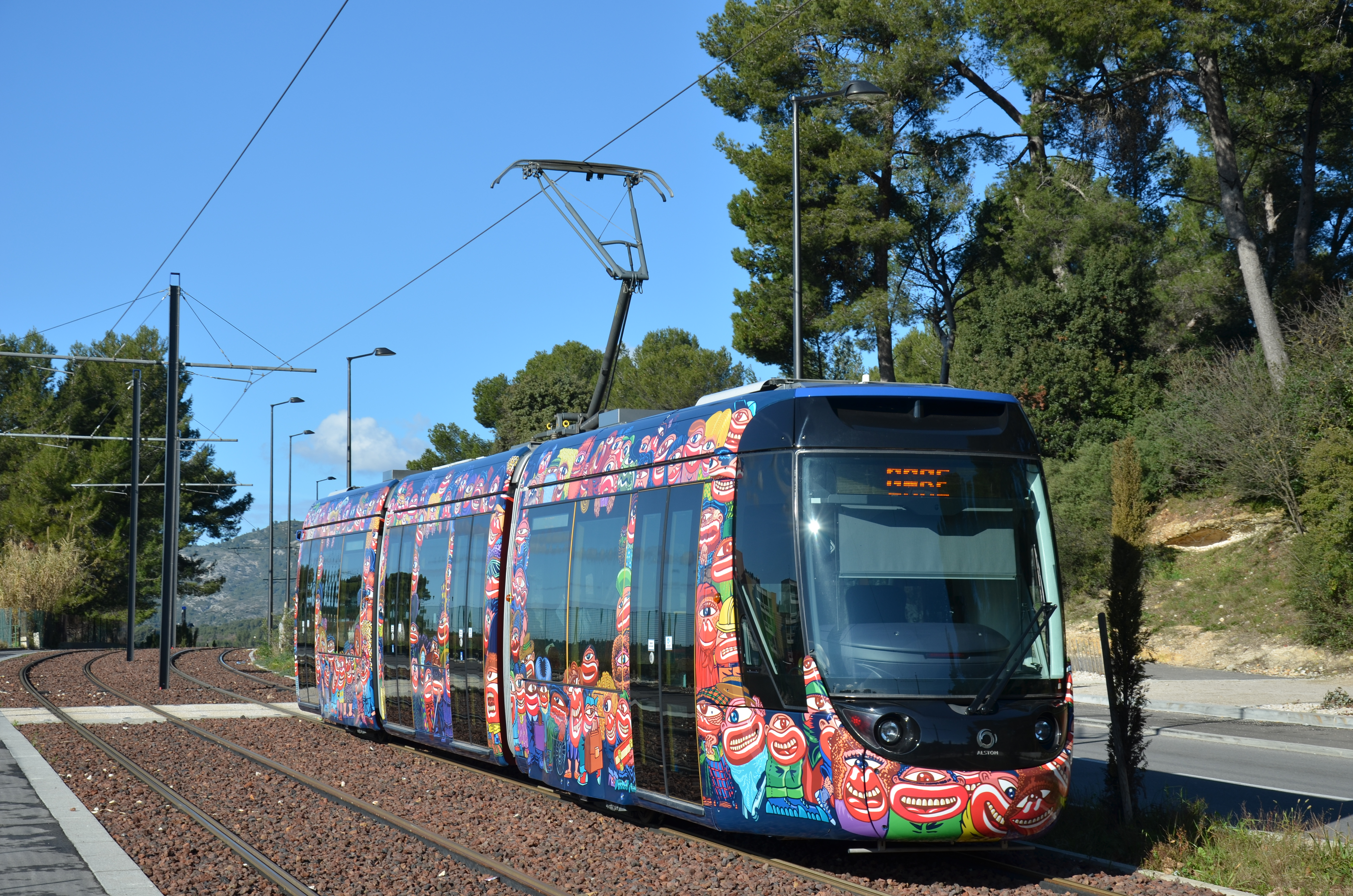
- A tram Alstom Citadis Compact between the Château Blanc and Piscine stations

Overview
- Native name: Tramway d'Aubagne
- Owner: Aix-Marseille-Provence Metropolis
- Locale: Aubagne, France
- Transit type: Tram
- Number of lines: 1
- Number of stations: 7
- Annual ridership: 2.26 million (2018)
- Website: www.lignes-agglo.fr

Operation
- Began operation: 1 September 2014
- Operator: Transport du Pays de l'Étoile (RTM)

Technical
- System length: 2.8 km (1.7 mi)

The Aubagne tramway (French: Tramway d'Aubagne) is a tram system in the commune of Aubagne, Aix-Marseille-Provence Metropolis, France. It consists of a single 2.8 km (1.7 mi) line called Line T, which serves seven stations since its inauguration on 1 September 2014 and does not charge fares.

Since 27 August 2017, the operation and maintenance of the Aubagne tramway has been entrusted to the Régie des transports métropolitains (RTM) of Marseille, via its transport subsidiary of Pays de l'Étoile. A northern extension from Aubagne station to the commune of La Bouilladisse is scheduled to open by 2027; it will bring the line's number of stations to seventeen.

== History ==
=== First system (1904–1958) ===
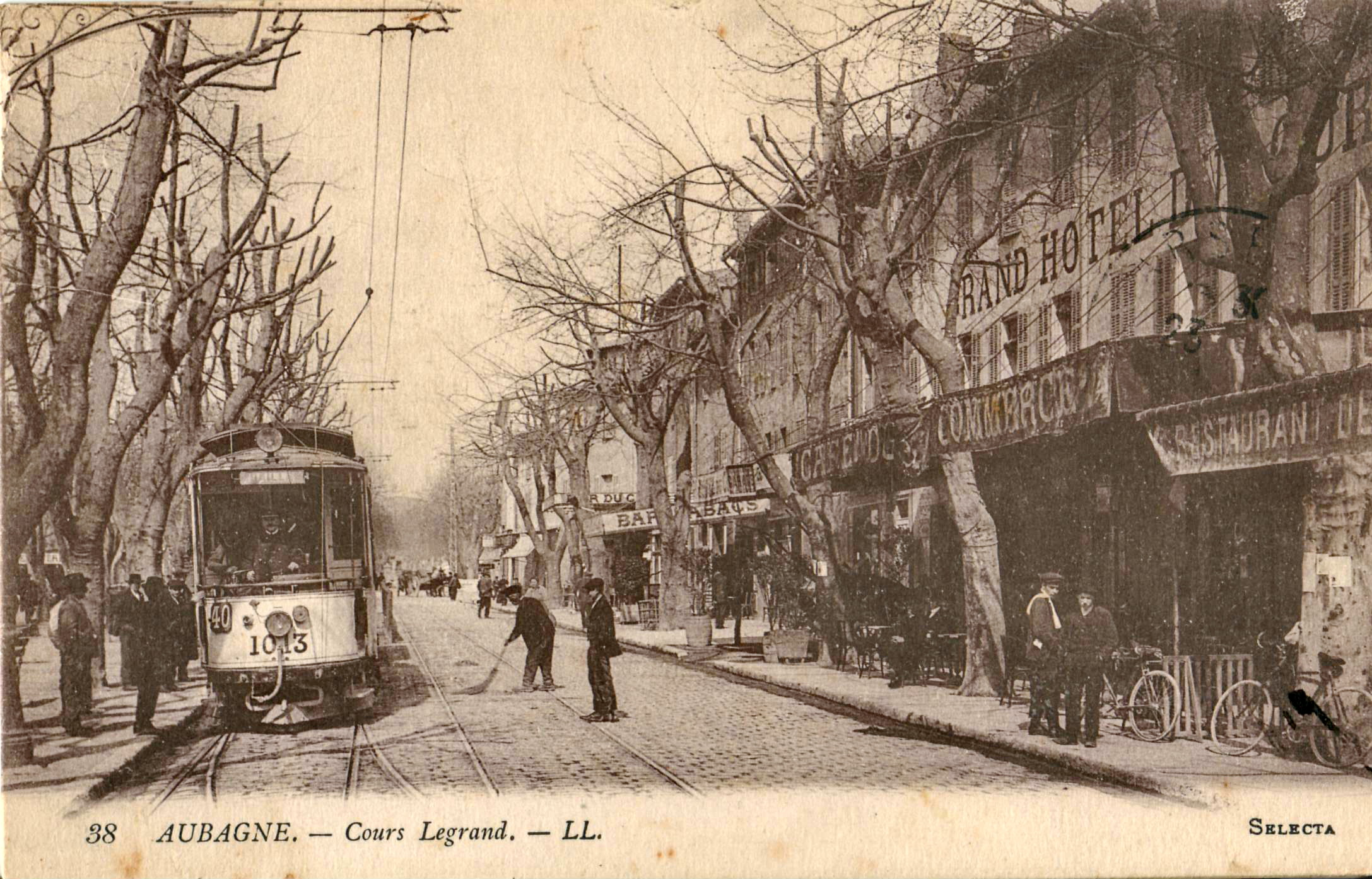
Line 40 on Cours Legrand, circa 1917

An agreement on 23 February 1904, validated by a decree on 26 March 1904, authorised the Compagnie Générale Française de Tramways (CGFT) – which operated the Marseille tram network – to build a line from Saint-Marcel to Aubagne on the condition that the departures take place from Place Saint-Ferréol. This line was put into service on 10 January 1905 with the route number 39. It originally had a single track outside of Marseille (doubled between 1926 and 1930) laid on a sidewalk along the national road. The terminus of Aubagne was located on Cours Legrand (current Cours Maréchal-Foch) from where a path lead to the depot located at the entrance of the "little road" from Aubagne to Marseille (current RD2) 1.

On 10 June 1905, Line 40 was established, running between Noailles station and Aubagne along the East Line to Saint-Pierre, then the Pomme Line ("Cayol Line", extended to Camoins in 1907) and finally a brief connection to the previous line laid along the current Boulevard Heckel. Departures then took place in an alternating manner with a departure on each line every 30 or 40 minutes. Due to users preferring the newer, faster route, service on Line 40 was augmented whilst Line 39 was limited to the Préfecture-La Penne-sur-Huveaune route from 3 May 1909.

The 40 trains included two trailers, one of which was detached at Penne-sur-Huveaune and picked up on the return journey. In 1928, reversible cars were put into service, consisting of a power train and a trailer or two power cars framing a trailer. These "Pullman" trams were replaced in 1937 by bogie trams, which were modernised beginning in 1944.

From 9 November 1950, the service began to be split between trams and buses, which connected the Noailles station to Saint-Pierre along the Cours Lieutaud, Baille boulevard and St. Pierre street, continuing parallel to the tram track, with trams only running during peak hours. On 23 June 1958, service between Saint-Pierre and Aubagne wound up, having lasted for 53 years.

=== Current system (2014–present) ===
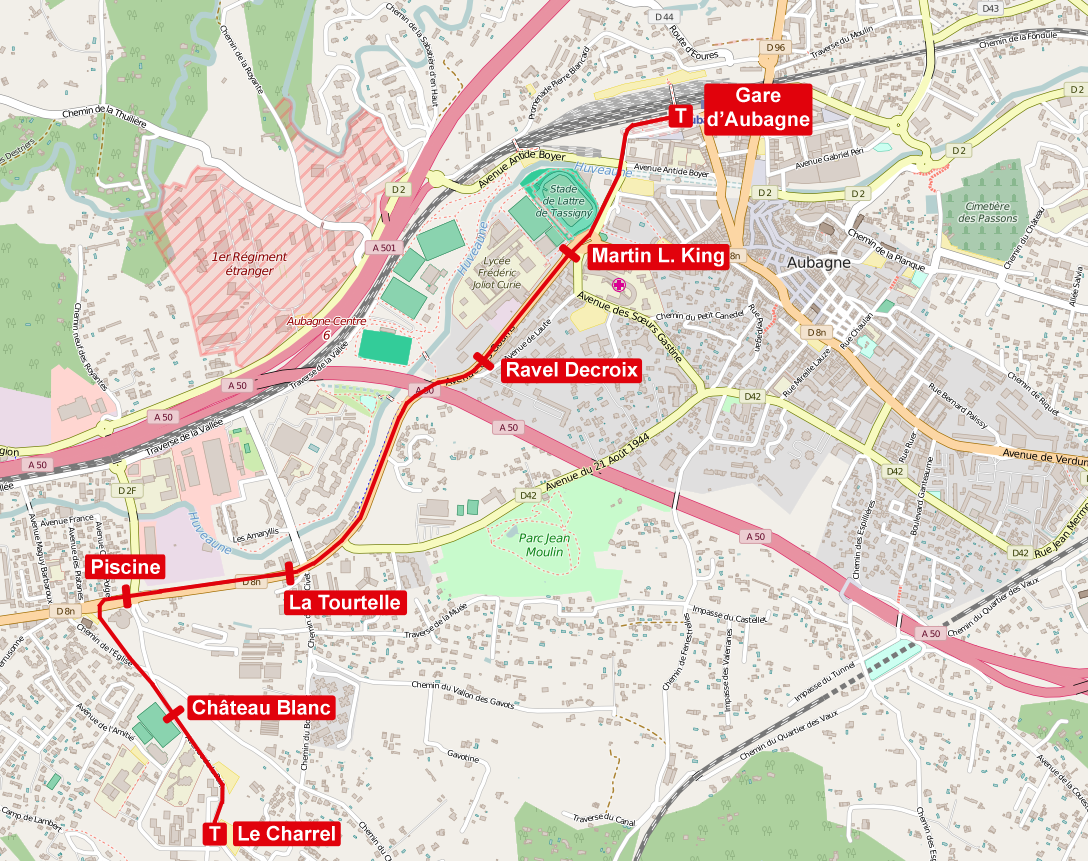
Current line map

The tram line runs between seven stations all of which are located within Aubagne. The line, like the municipal bus system which has been operating fare-free since 15 May 2009, set a world first in public transportation. The initial project comprised two lines with a common central section; the second line was cancelled in 2014.

== Extension ==
President of the Departmental Council of Bouches-du-Rhône Martine Vassal announced in 2019 an extension of Line T to La Bouilladisse via Roquevaire and Auriol. The project, which will cost 136 million euros, will partially use the disused Aubagne to La Barque line, which closed in 2002. Works started in Aubagne in 2023. The extension to La Bouilladisse will open in 2027.

Extension project from Aubagne station

Extended line map
