= Marseille Metro =

Rapid transit system serving Marseille

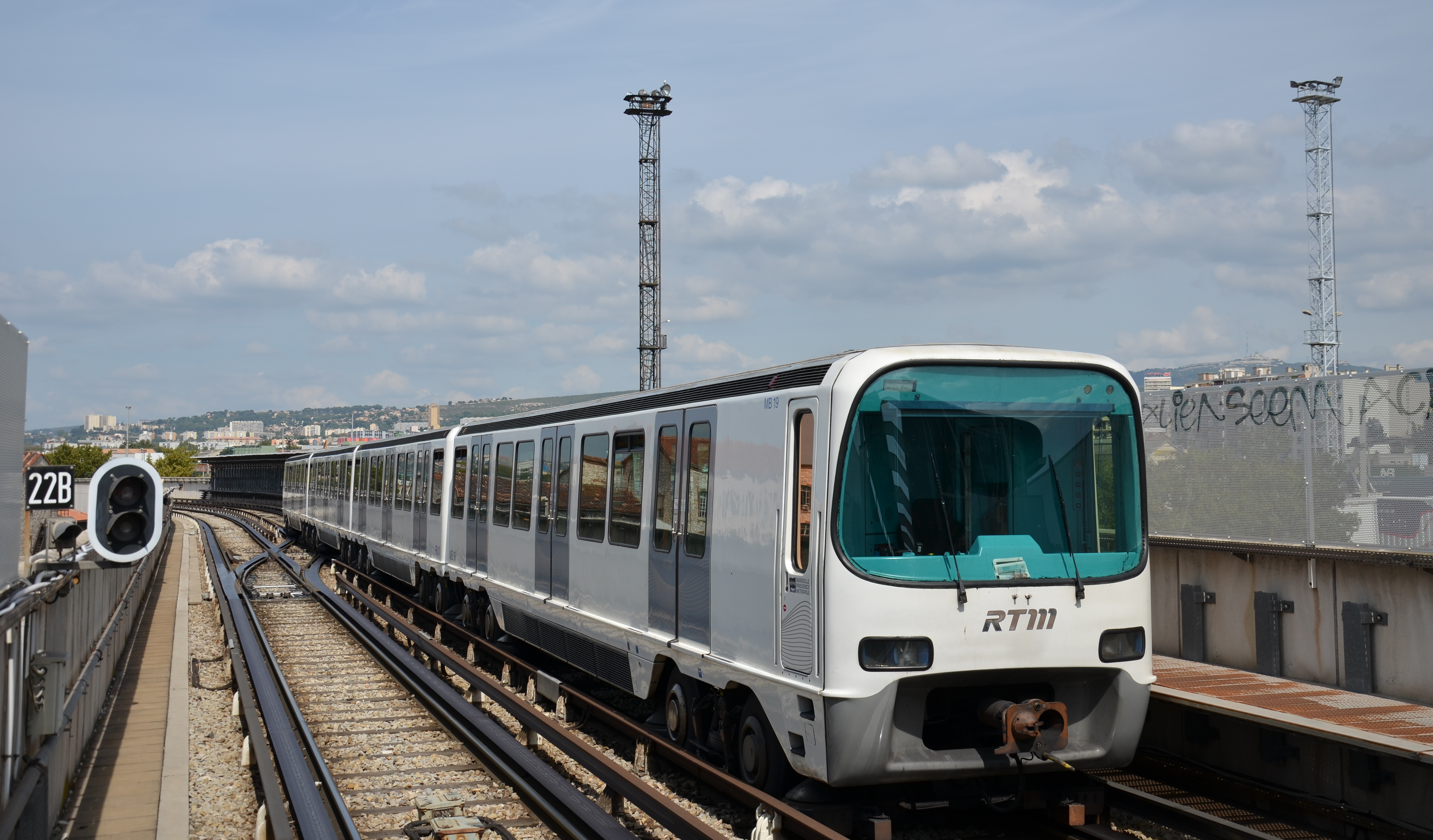
- MPM 76 train on Line 2

Overview
- Native name: Métro de Marseille
- Locale: Marseille, France
- Transit type: Rapid transit
- Number of lines: 2+(2+1=)5*
- Number of stations: 31
- Daily ridership: 210,200 (daily avg., 2012)
- Annual ridership: 76.7 million (2012)
- Website: RTM

Operation
- Began operation: 26 November 1977; 48 years ago
- Operator: RTM

Technical
- System length: 22.7 km (14.1 mi)
- Track gauge: 1,435 mm (4 ft 8 1/2 in) standard gauge
System map

The Marseille Metro (French: Métro de Marseille, [metʁo d(ə) maʁsɛj]) is a rapid transit system serving Marseille, France. The system comprises two lines, partly underground, serving 31 stations, with an overall route length of 22.7 kilometres (14.1 mi). Line 1 opened in 1977, followed by Line 2 in 1984. Two stations, Saint-Charles and Castellane, each provide interchange between lines.

The system's MPM 76 trains use the rubber-tyred metro technology developed by the RATP for some lines of the Paris Métro. In 2012, the Marseille Metro carried approximately 76.7 million passengers, making it a core part of the transport network in the Marseille urban area, with 49% of journeys using the metro. Since 1986, the Régie des transports métropolitains (Régie des transports de Marseille until 2016) has operated the network, operating it since it changed its name on behalf of the Aix-Marseille-Provence Metropolis.

== Timeline ==
Date	Line	Event
26 November 1977	Line 1	First section opened between La Rose and Saint-Charles
11 March 1978	Line 1	Extended southwards from Saint-Charles to Castellane
3 March 1984	Line 2	Section opened between Joliette and Castellane
1 February 1986	Line 2	Extended southwards from Castellane to Sainte-Marguerite Dromel
14 February 1987	Line 2	Extended northwards from Joliette to Bougainville
5 September 1992	Line 1	Extended eastwards from Castellane to La Timone
5 May 2010	Line 1	Extended eastwards from La Timone to La Fourragère
16 December 2019	Line 2	Extended northwards from Bougainville to Gèze
Before 2030	Line 2	Planned extension eastwards from Sainte-Marguerite Dromel to Saint-Loup Pagnol with 6 new stations, between 4.1 kilometres (2.5 mi) and 4.6 kilometres (2.9 mi)
After 2035	Line 03* & Line 04*	Planned opening between Luminy and Saint-Charles with 15 new stations, between 9.6 kilometres (6.0 mi) and 10 kilometres (6.2 mi)

== History ==
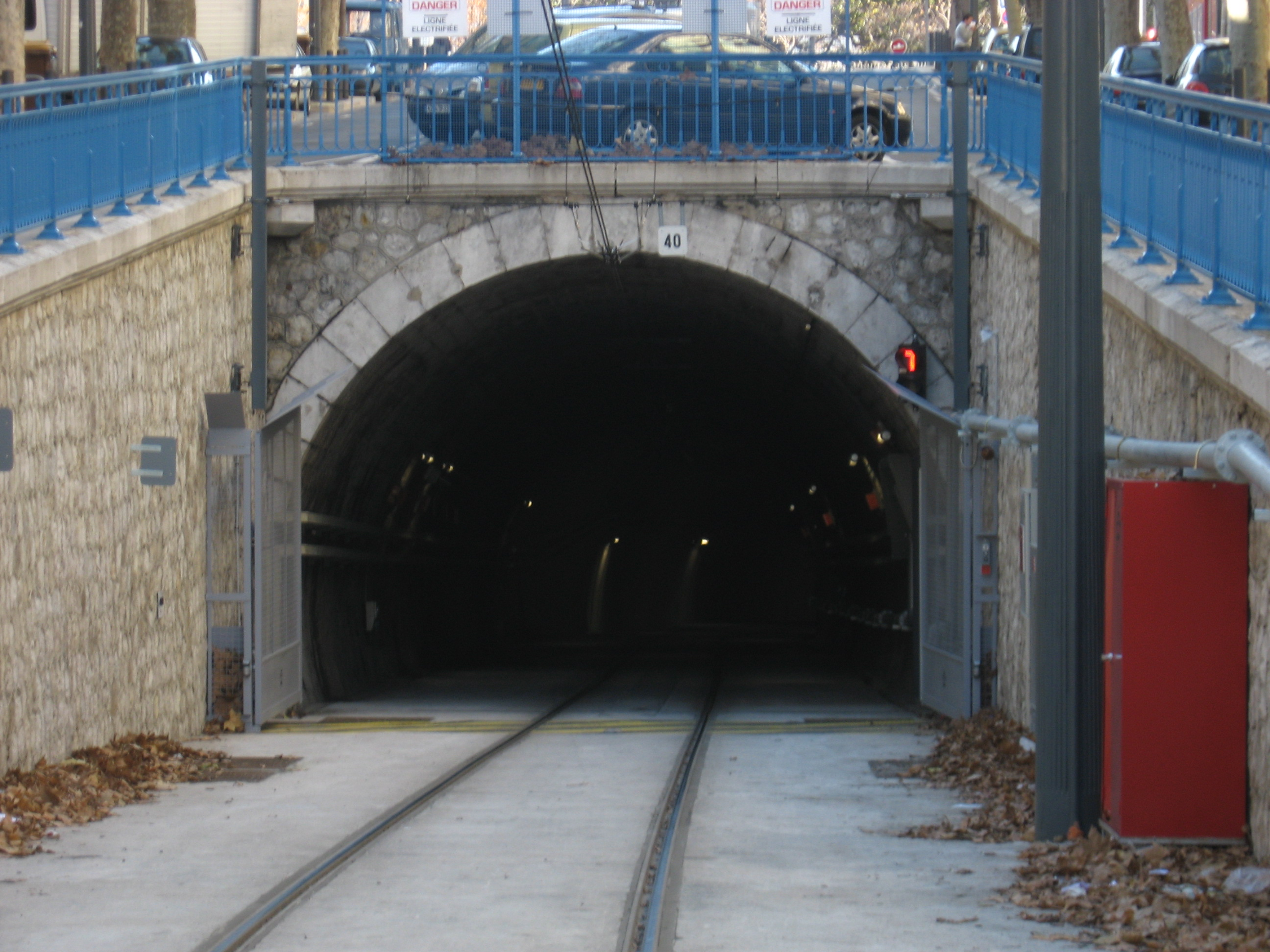
Tunnel mouth in Noailles, built for the original tramway network

The first plans for a metro system in Marseille appeared in the early years of the 20th century, following the opening of the Paris Métro. Many plans were put forward, but quickly abandoned due to lack of financing. The most serious proposal emanated in 1918 from the Compagnie d'électricité de Marseille, which proposed to build an underground network similar to the Paris métro. This proposal was met with fierce opposition from the Compagnie générale française de tramways, which owned and operated the city's tramway system. This project ultimately failed, and the idea of building a metro in Marseille was abandoned for many decades.

Several proposals came immediately before and after the Second World War calling for modernizing the existing tramways with a network of lines running underground, but all were scrapped due to material shortages. Instead, the system, so badly damaged by the conflict, was almost completely dismantled during the following decade and replaced by buses (with the exception of line 68). However, by 1960, the city was suffering from severe congestion due to the growth in automobile use. A number of alternative concepts came forward at the time, including light rail or commuter train networks, but found no support among municipal authorities. It was not until 1964, when a project calling for a construction of an underground metro line to replace the busiest bus routes, that interest was aroused among elected officials. After several years of studies, the city council voted unanimously in 1969 for the creation of a metro system.

Construction of the first line started on August 13, 1973 and lasted until early 1977. Revenue operation started on November 26, 1977 on a portion of the line, between La Rose and Saint-Charles. The rest of the line opened on March 11, 1978. The plans for the second line were approved in 1978. Construction began in 1980. The central portion of the line, between Joliette and Castellane, opened on March 3, 1984. Southern and northern portions of the line were opened in February 1986 and February 1987 respectively.

Subsequent extensions took place in the following years. Line 1 was first extended between Castellane and La Timone on September 5, 1992 (1.5 km (0.93 mi), 2 new stations), and then between La Timone and La Fourragère (2.5 km (1.6 mi), 4 new stations) in 2010. On 16 December 2019, line 2 was extended northwards from Bougainville to Gèze (0.9 km (0.56 mi), 1 new station).

== Current network ==
=== Rolling stock ===
The rolling stock comprises 36 4-car trains, named MPM 76. Trains have a capacity of 472 passengers (including 182 seats). MPM 76 trains use the rubber tyre metro technology developed by the RATP for the Paris métro.

Trains were built in Valenciennes, France, by a group of French companies which are now part of Alstom group. A first batch of 21 3-car trains was delivered in 1976, for line 1. A second batch of 15 was delivered in 1983, for line 2. In 1985, a fourth car was added on every train, in order to increase capacity.

=== Commercial operation ===
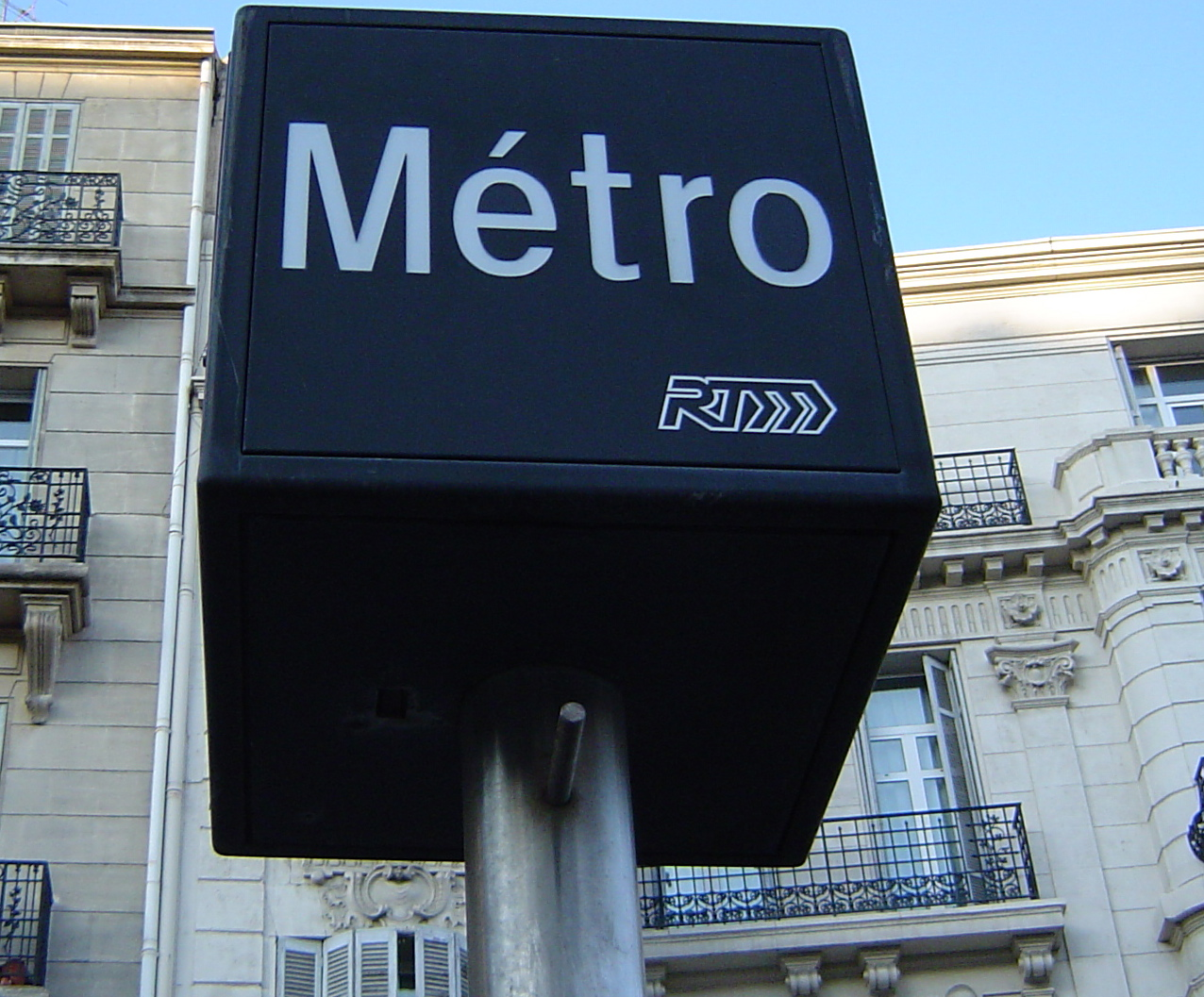

The metro system is operated by the Régie des Transports Métropolitains, on behalf of the Urban Community of Marseille Provence Métropole, which owns the infrastructure as well as the rolling stock.

Service is open every day, from 5 am to 1 am the next day. Trains run every 3 minutes during rush hour, and every 10 minutes during evenings.

The metro system transported 76.7 million passengers in 2013, leading to an average daily ridership of over 210,000.

== Planned developments ==
A 900-metre (0.56 mi) long extension of line 2 to Capitaine Gèze was opened in December 2019, North of the current terminus station Bougainville. The new Capitaine Gèze station will feature a bus station and a park and ride facility. This short extension will reuse existing service tracks that currently lead to the Zoccola depot. The cost is estimated to be 85 million euros.

In 2012, it was projected that the MPM76 rolling stock would be replaced starting in 2020.

The new rolling stock built by Alstom will be gradually rolled out at the end of 2024 and will be operated first with a driver and then fully automatic when all the old trains are replaced. The new rolling stock will have open gangways and will have a frequency of 90 seconds. The stations will all be equipped with platform screen doors and retrofitted with accessibility.

A 15* km extension of line 2 to La Pomme railway station is planned for 2030-2035. This extension will include 6 new stations.

Several other long-term extensions, including a northern extension of line 3 and a fourth line, are being considered. The cost is estimated to be €125 million.

== See also ==
- List of Marseille Metro stations
- Marseille tramway
- List of metro systems
