= Henri Tasso =

French politician

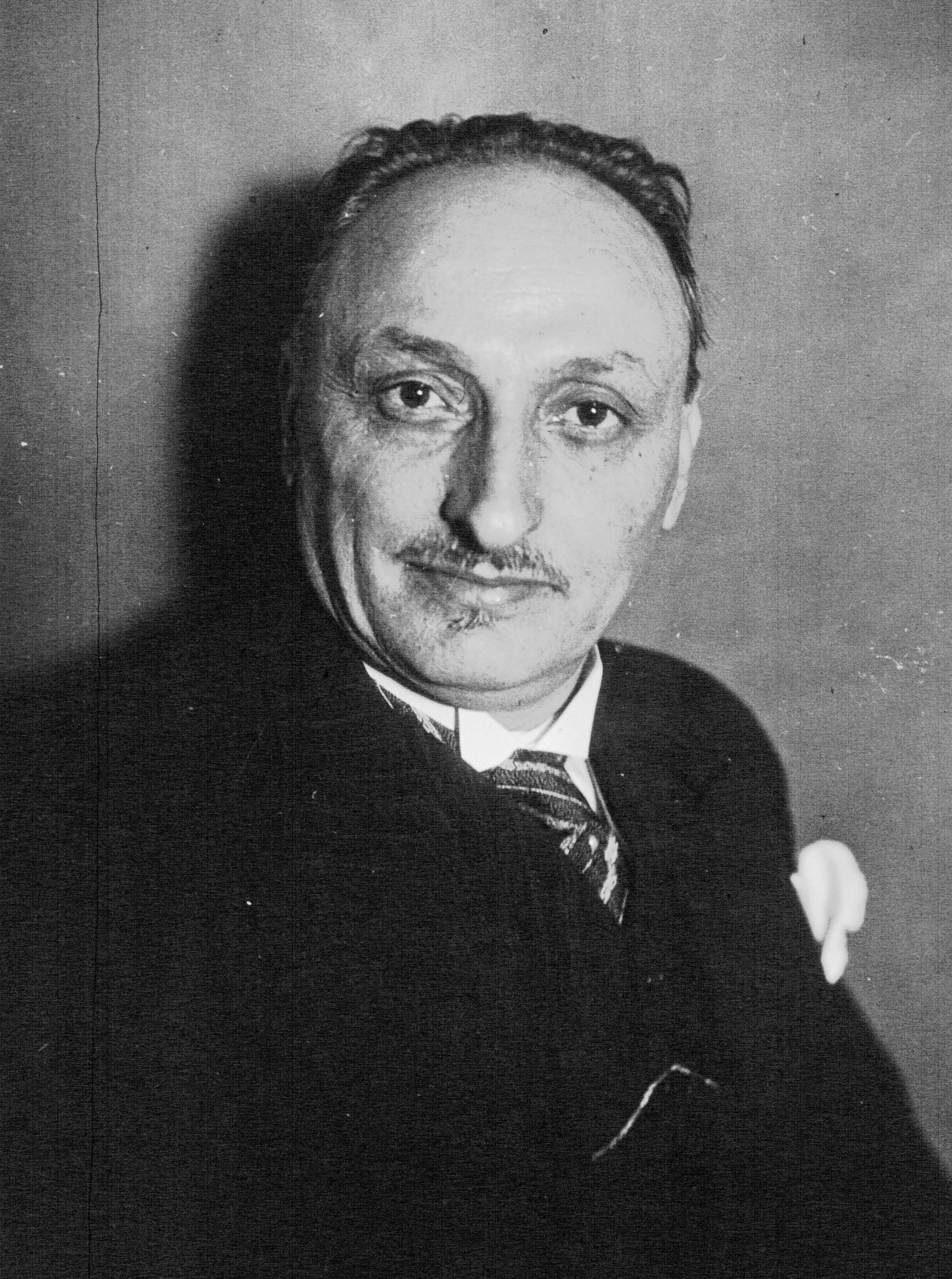
- Henri Tasso in 1932
- Born: 8 October 1882; Marseille, France
- Died: 12 February 1944 (aged 61); Allauch, France
- Occupation: Politician
- Spouse: Thérèse Gairaud
- Parent(s): Michel-Théodore Tasso; Dominique Eusébie Marie Montefrestini

Henri Tasso (8 October 1882 – 12 February 1944) was a French Socialist politician. He served as the Mayor of Marseille from 1935 to 1939. He also served as a member of the National Assembly from 1924 to 1938, and of the Senate from 1938 to 1945.

== Early life ==
Henri Tasso was born on 8 October 1882 in Marseille. His parents, Michel-Théodore Tasso and Dominique Eusébie Marie Montefrestini, were Italian immigrants to France.

== Career ==
A member of the French Section of the Workers' International (SFIO), he served as a member of the National Assembly from 1924 to 1938. He supported the naturalisation of Italian immigrants, even those who were poor and unemployed.

He served as the Socialist Mayor of Marseille from 1935 to 1939. On 8 October 1938 a fire burnt down Les Nouvelles Galeries, a department store on the Canebière. Shortly after, he was dismissed. Others have argued he was dismissed "because of his inappropriate financial management and chronic overhiring of municipal workers."

He also served as a member of the Senate from 1938 to 1944.

== Personal life ==
He married Thérèse Gairaud.

== Death ==
He died on 12 February 1944 in Allauch.
