= Marseille tramway =

Public transport system in Marseille, France

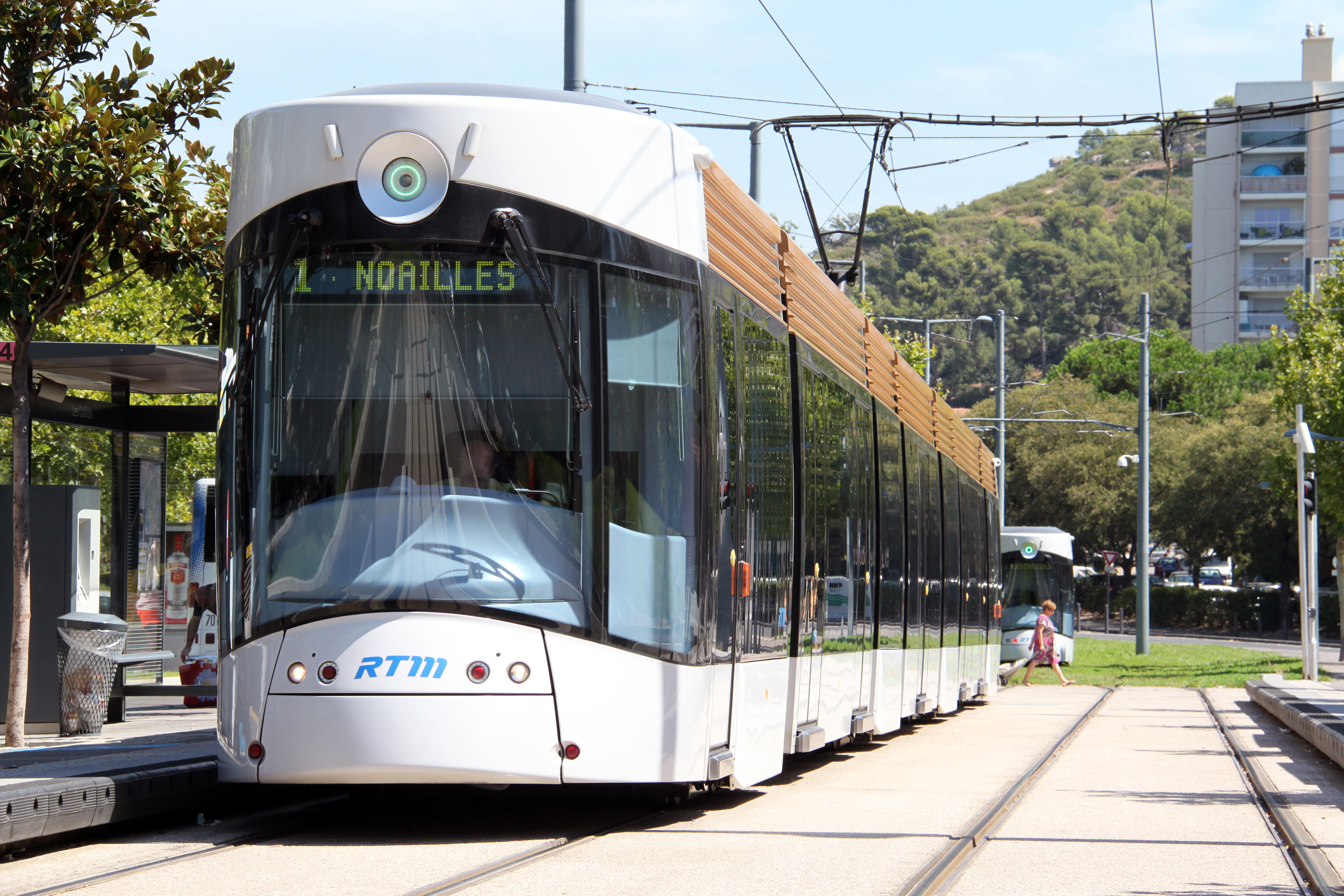
- Les Caillols station, Line 1's eastern terminus

Overview
- Native name: Tramway de Marseille
- Locale: Marseille, France
- Transit type: Tram
- Number of lines: 3
- Number of stations: 32

Operation
- Began operation: 1876 (horsecar); 1899 (electrical tram); 2007 (modern tram)
- Operator: RTM

Technical
- System length: 19.2 km (11.9 mi)
- Track gauge: 1,435 mm (4 ft 8 1/2 in) standard gauge
System map

The Marseille tramway (French: Tramway de Marseille; Occitan: Tramway de Marselha) is a tramway system in Marseille, France. The city's modern tram network now consists of three lines, serving 32 stations and operating over 19.2 kilometres (11.9 mi) of route. The current, modern Marseille tram network opened on 7 July 2007.

The first horse tramway opened in Marseille on 21 January 1876; electric trams came to Marseille in 1899. Unlike most other French cities, trams continued to operate in Marseille, even as through the 1950s and beyond trams disappeared from most cities around the world. The original tram system continued to operate until 2004, when the last line, Line 68, was closed. Trams remained out of operation for three years between 2004 and 2007, in advance of the effort to renovate the tram network to modern standards.

== History ==
=== Historical tram network ===
The first tram, horse drawn, ran in 1876 on Canebière. The electrification began in 1899 and preceded the delivery of new electric tramcars, all similar as to keep a consistent pool of cars. In 1905, a batch of bogie-tramcars was purchased, these were equipped with trailers and were used on suburban lines.

The system comprised purely urban lines and suburban lines, which stretched to outlying villages. Many tram lines joined in the centre of Marseille on the Canebière and the harbour, resulting in headways of less than a minute in the city centre.

This huge network was modernised by the constant introduction of newer tramcars, to replace the older ones. In 1938, thirty-three trailers were recovered from Paris. These meant that reversible convoys could be operated. In 1939, the tramway company owned and operated 430 tramcars, 350 trailers and 71 lines.

In 1943 a large project, never realised, was designed. This project planned to build large tunnels in the centre of Marseille. The busiest lines would join into two tunnels. In 1949 a further modernisation occurred. The first articulated tramcars was designed and built (The Algiers tramway possessed articulated SATRAMO tramcars). These were created by joining two older tramcars. These tramcars remained unique until 1985 when the Nantes tramway opened.

Marseille city council did not favour keeping its network of trams. Indeed, unorganised development of the car meant that modernisation and expansion of the tram network was hindered. The process of replacing tramways with trolleybuses and buses began after World War II in 1945 and accelerated from 1950. The first closures meant that Canebière was tramway-free from 1955. The last closure occurred on 21 January 1960.

==== Line 68 ====
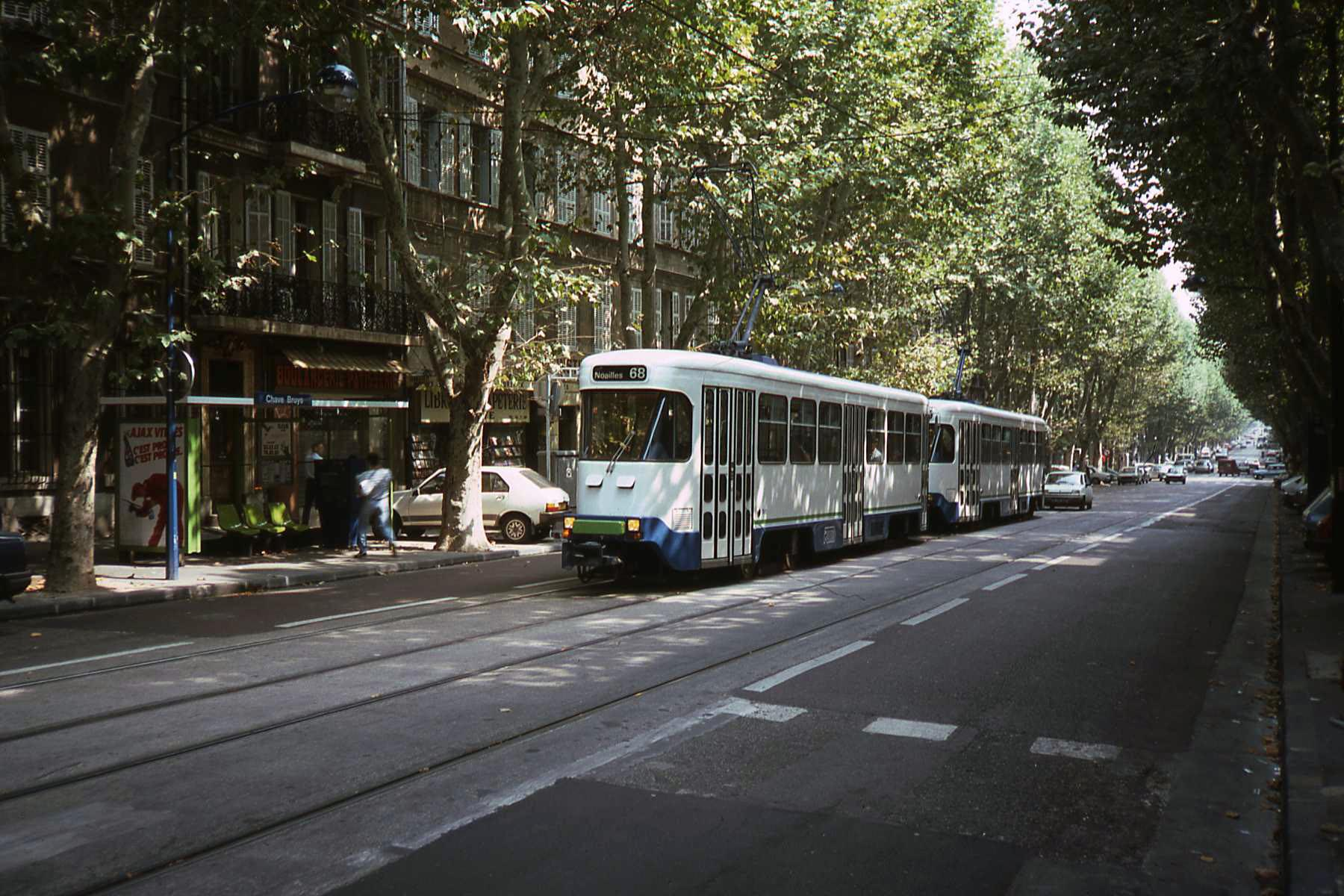
A PCC tram operating in multiple unit on route 68 in 1984

Line 68 opened in December 1893 and was the only tramway line to remain in service during the later part of the twentieth century. The line stretched from Noailles to Alhambra, serving La Plaine, the Boulevard Chave, the La Blancarde railway station and the Saint-Pierre cemetery. The central terminus was situated in a tunnel that was unique in France. It was built in 1893 to give access to the city centre, avoiding the narrow streets of some of Marseille's suburbs. Due to problems involved in converting the line to bus use, it was decided to maintain the tramway service.

Line 68 is 3 km (1.9 mi) long and it remained operational up to 1968 when it was decided to modernise it and to relay the whole track. The last of the old tramcars were withdrawn. The line was reopened in 1969 with the introduction of sixteen two-directional PCC tramcars, built by BN in Bruges. The first of them arrived on 26 December 1968, and the first tram entered revenue earning service on 20 February 1969. Modernisation resulted in an increase in passengers, with numbers increasing from 4,917,000 passengers in 1968 to 5,239,000 in 1973.

By the early 1980s, the system was one of just three French tram systems, along with those of Lille and St. Etienne, remaining in operation (albeit reduced to a single route) – until the opening of a new system in Nantes in 1985 began a tramway revival in the country. Further modernisation was applied to the PCC cars in 1984. Three additional cars of the same type were delivered by BN and all cars were fitted for multiple-unit operation.

The line closed on Thursday, 8 January 2004 for reconstruction. All nineteen PCC cars were withdrawn from service. The short section between La Blancarde and Saint Pierre was reopened as part of a new network on 30 June 2007. The section along Boulevard Chave to Eugène Pierre was due to reopen in October 2007; the tunnel to Noailles was due to reopen in summer 2008.

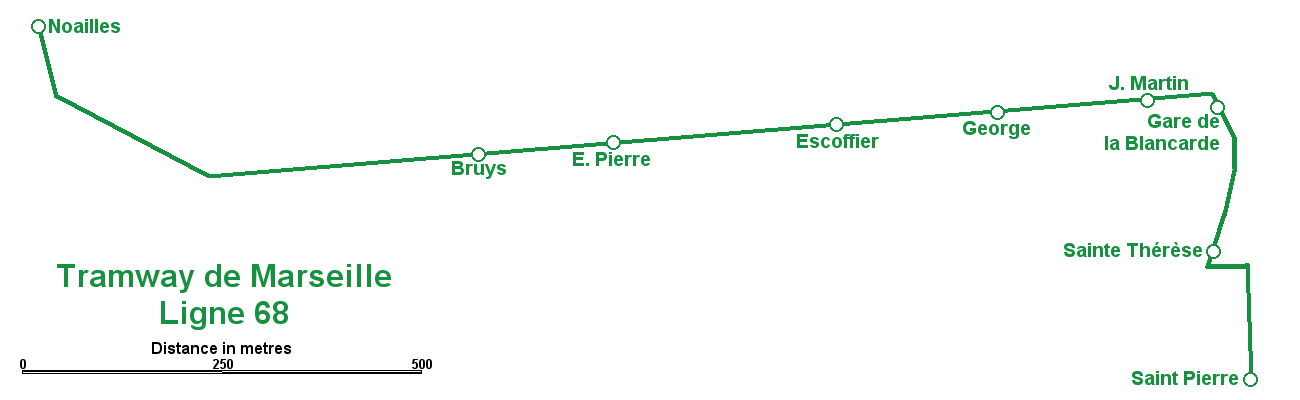
Map of line 68

=== Modern tram network ===
A new tram network is being built in Marseille, France, which—once completed—will comprise three lines (T1, T2, T3). The first phase opened on 30 June 2007, establishing a single line running between Euroméditerranée‑Gantès and Les Caillols. This phase involved extensive urban renewal efforts—including reconfiguring key boulevards and reconstructing sidewalks—to reduce car traffic and promote pedestrians, cycling, and public transit.

==== Phase 1: Mid-2007 to Mid-2008 ====
On 30 June 2007, the first phase of the new Marseille tram network opened. It consists of one line linking Euroméditerranée in the northwest with Les Caillols in the east. Between Blancarde Chave and Saint-Pierre stations, it runs on part of the former Line 68.

In November 2007, the portion of the old Line 68 between Blancarde Chave. and E.-Pierre (near the entrance to the tunnel) reopened, and two lines were created. Line 1 links E.-Pierre and Les Caillols, and line 2 runs from Euroméditerranée to La Blancarde, where a transfer between the two lines was created.

La Blancarde train station is a transit hub: a station on Line 1 of the Marseille Metro opened in 2010, and it has long been served by TER regional trains to and from Toulon.

In September 2008, line 1 was extended to Noailles via the tunnel formerly used by line 68. This tunnel now carries a single track since the new trams are wider than the 68's PCC. In March 2010, line 2 was extended 700 meters north from Euroméditerranée-Gantes to Arenc.

==== Phase 2: Line 3 ====
On May 30, 2015, the 3.8 km (2.4 mi) line 3 was inaugurated. It shares line 2 tracks between Arenc and la Canebière where line 2 turns west. Line 3 then continued south on new track through Rue de Rome to Place Castellane. Extensions for Line 3 north to Gèze and south to La Gaye were also envisaged with the Line 3 project in order to create a north-south link within the city, and construction work on these extensions began in July 2021. The 1.8 km (1.1 mi) northern extension to Gèze was eventually inaugurated on January 7, 2026, with the 4.4 km (2.7 mi) southern extension to La Gaye opening three days later on January 10, 2026. With these extensions, Line 3 reached a total of 9.8 kilometres (6.1 mi), with 22 stations served along its route.

== Rolling stock ==
=== Bombardier Flexity Outlook ===
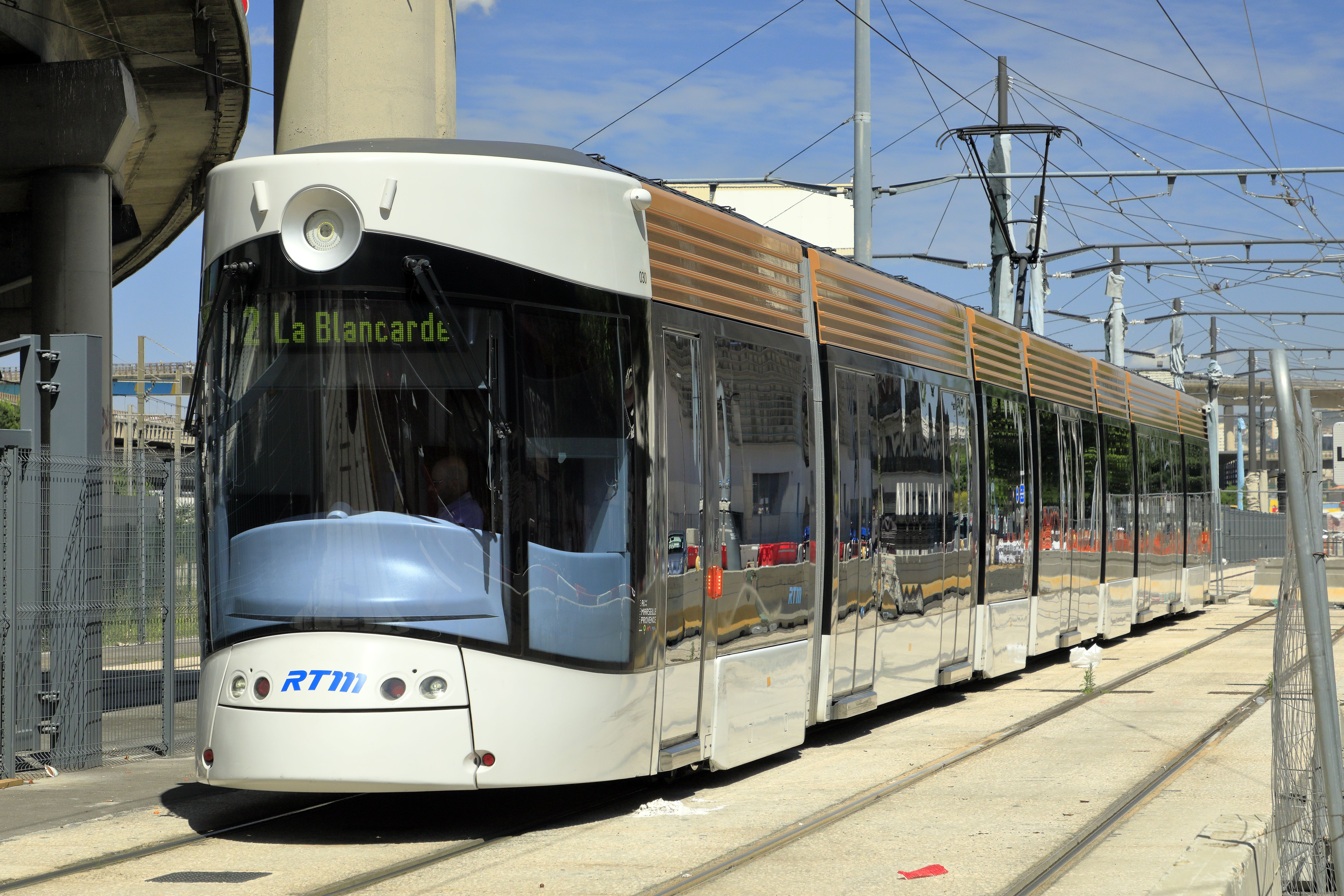
A Flexity Outlook tram at Arenc-Euroméditerranée station in 2024.

Customized Bombardier Flexity Outlook trams are used on the new tram network. Composed of five articulated sections, they are 32.5 m (106 ft 8 in) long and 2.4 m (7 ft 10 in) wide. Twenty-six were delivered in 2007. They were extended by 10 m (32 ft 10 in) by adding two additional articulated sections in 2012. In May 2012, six new Flexity trams were ordered for line T3.

Their exterior and interior appearance was designed by MBD Design. The exterior resembles the hull of a ship, and the driver's cabin resembles the bow. A lighted circle displays the colour of the line the tram is on. Inside the tram, the floor, walls, and ceiling are coloured blue, and seats and shutters are made of wood.

=== CAF Urbos 100X ===
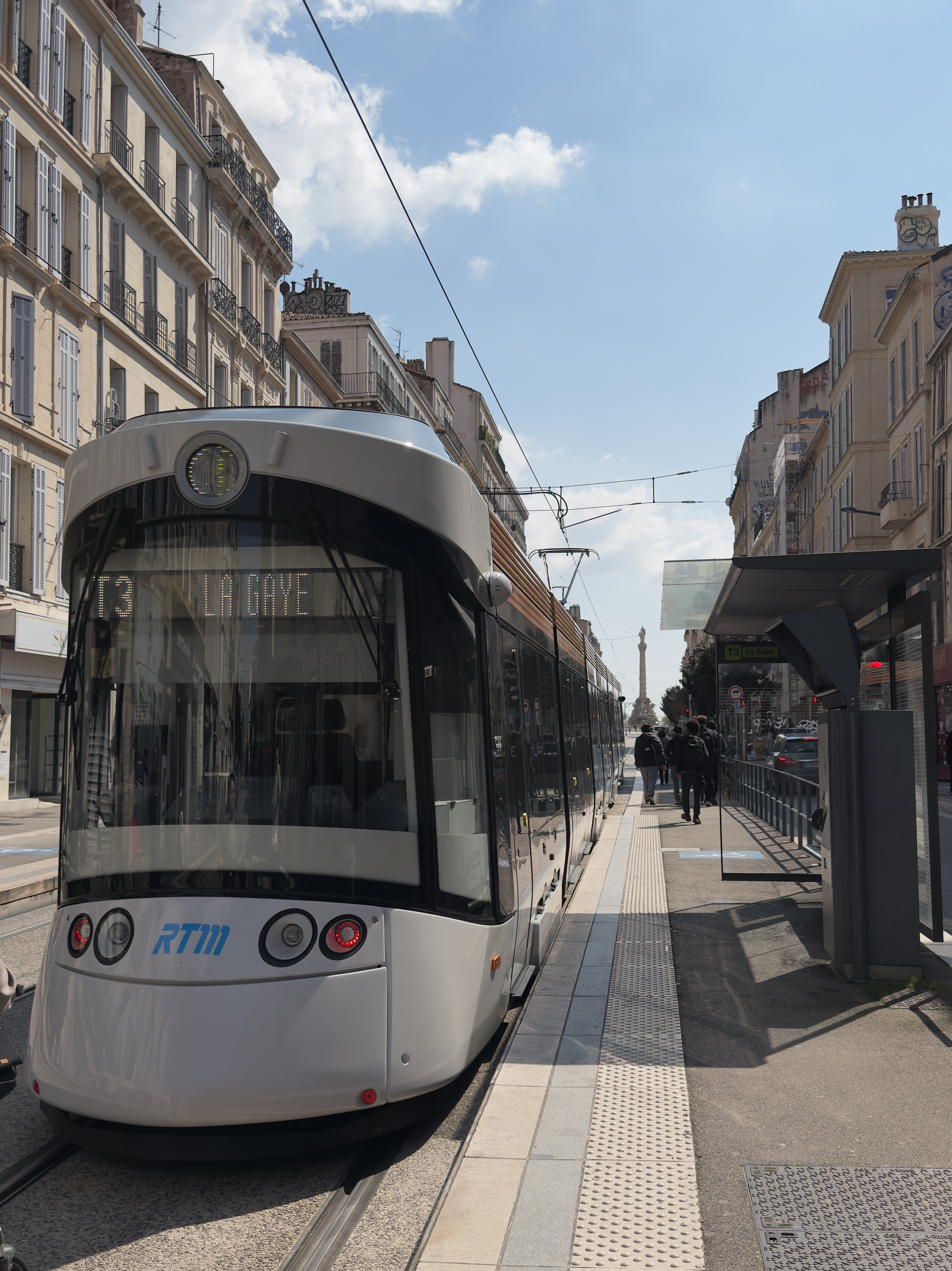
An Urbos 100X tram on a Line 3 service to La Gaye in 2026.

In September 2022, the RTM (Régie des Transports Métropolitains) placed an order with the Spanish rail vehicle manufacturer CAF for the supply of 15 Urbos 100X trams for operation on the extended Line 3. Based on the design of the existing Flexity Outlook trams already in service, the new trams have seven sections, and are 42.5 m (139 ft 5 in) long and 2.65 m (8 ft 8 in) wide. The first tram of the new fleet was delivered on July 8, 2025, and entered service in conjunction with the extensions of Line T3 in January 2026. Delivery of the trams is planned to continue until 2030.

== Operation ==
The tram network is run by Le Tram, a consortium of the RTM and Veolia Transport. The proposal to privatize the operation of public transit was unpopular, and resulted in a 46-day transit strike.

== See also ==
- Marseille Metro
- Public transport in Marseille
- Trams in France
- List of town tramway systems in France
