= MPM 76 =

Type of rubber-tyred metro used by the Marseille Metro

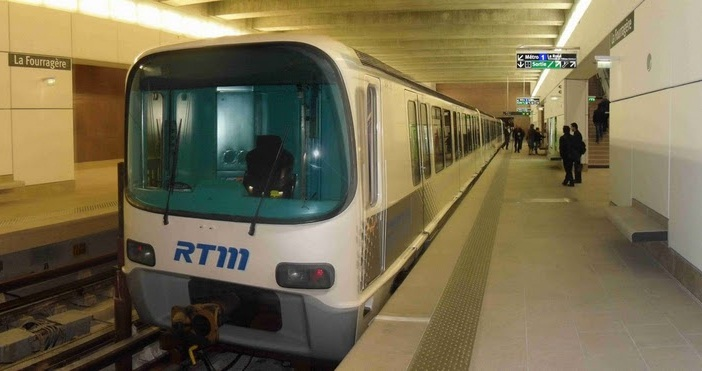
- A MPM 76 train at La Fourragère terminus

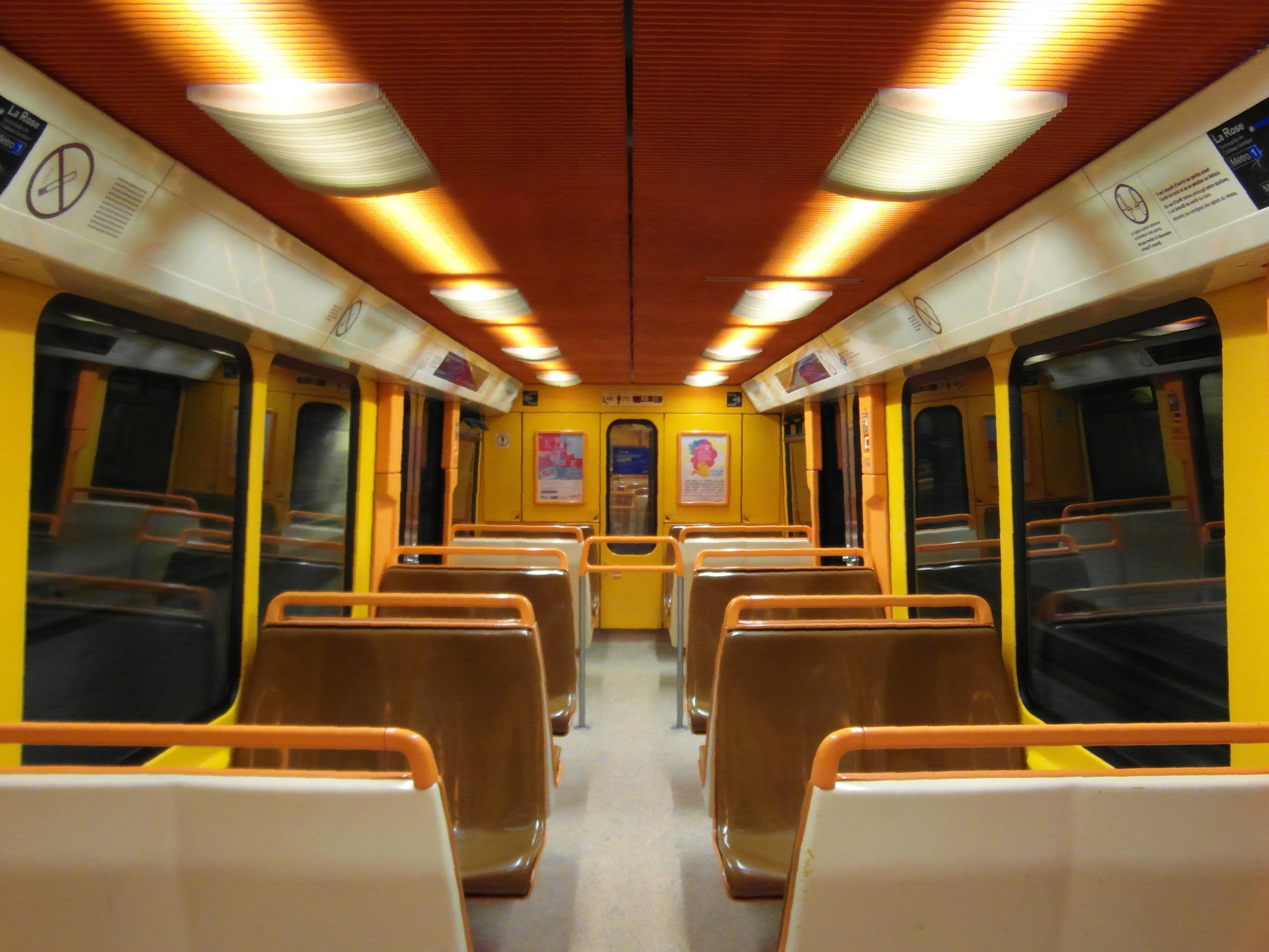
- Interior of a train
- Manufacturer: Alstom
- Entered service: 1976
- Refurbished: 2005–2007
- Scrapped: c. 2028
- Formation: 4 voitures (M-N-R-M)
- Capacity: 182 (Seated); 472 (Total)
- Operators: RTM (Marseille Metro)

Specifications
- Train length: 65.65 m (215 ft 5 in)
- Width: 2.6 m (8 ft 6 in)
- Floor height: 1.1 m (3 ft 7 in)
- Wheel diameter: 1,005 mm (39.6 in)
- Maximum speed: 80 km/h (50 mph)
- Electric system(s): DC 750V
- Bogies: 8
- Track gauge: Rubber tyre

The MPM-76 (Métro Pneumatique Marseille 1976) is a type of rubber-tyred EMU built by Alstom for the Marseille Metro.

== History ==
Following the 1971 call for tenders for the creation of the Marseille metro, a contract for the supply of 21 trains (of three cars each) was signed on 1 November 1973. The first train is delivered on August 27, 1976, at Saint-Marcel station. The first tests took place at the La Rose depot in September 1976. The other trains were gradually delivered until the summer of 1977.

The trains are designed with the help of RATP and its subsidiary SOFRETU. Tests have also taken place on line 11 of Paris Métro. The construction is ensured by a group of industrialists, including companies CIMT (caisses) and MTE (electrical equipment), under the aegis of Société Générale de Travaux et d'Etudes (SGTE).

On the occasion of the creation of the second metro line, 15 additional trains (with three cars) are ordered and are delivered at the beginning of the year 1983.

In addition, a fourth car is added on the existing trains to cope with the increase of passengers. These cars are delivered and installed during the year 1985.

In 2005, trains sustain a mid-life renovation.

== Specifications ==
=== Overview ===
The trains have a length of 65.65 metres (215 ft 5 in) and a width of 2.6 m (8 ft 6 in), for an empty weight of 75 tons. The cars are made of welded aluminum.

The electricity supply is done by means of a wiper. The supply voltage is 750 volts DC.

The MPM 76 is a rubber-tyred metro and uses the technology developed by the RATP for the Paris metro. It is derived from the RATP MP 73 but their motor noise is similar to the Parisian MP 59.

=== Composition ===
Each train consists of four cars (2 motor with driving cab framing a trailer and a motor without cabin).

Engines and trailers are numbered as follows:

- MA 01 to MA 42 for end motor trains delivered in 1976–77
- RA 01 to RA 21 for train trailers delivered in 1976–77
- MB 01 to MB 30 for end motor trains delivered in 1983
- RB 01 to RB 15 for trailers delivered in 1983
- NB 01 to NB 36 for intermediate drives (called "neutral").

Each train is designated by the number of its trailer. The trains are thus numbered from 1 to 36.

=== Traction ===
MPM 76 trains have a maximum speed of 80 km/h (50 mph).

Each power unit has two motor bogies, each equipped with two electric motors, operating at 750 V and displaying a unit power of 130 kW in continuous mode. The motors are electrically connected two by two in series, and are controlled by means of Jeumont-Heidmann resistor contactors.

=== Braking ===
The braking of the trains is ensured by:

- an electric brake by recovery, and
- a mechanical brake with pneumatic control.

The mechanical brake uses beech wooden shoes, which bear on the tread of the iron safety wheels. Some of these skates are made in the Vaugirard workshop of the Paris metro.

=== Interior design ===
Each four-car train has a capacity of 472 passengers, with 182 seated.

The seats are arranged perpendicular to the walls of the cars, following a 2 + 2 diagram. The seats are made of a polyester shell, and are free of any fabric or padding, to limit damage and vandalism.

In 2015, RTM installed CCTV cameras in every car.

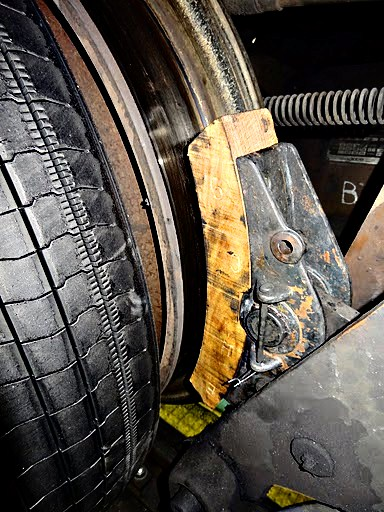
Braking is done by means of Beech skates.

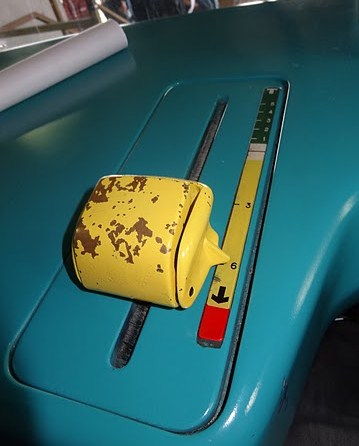
Traction manipulator

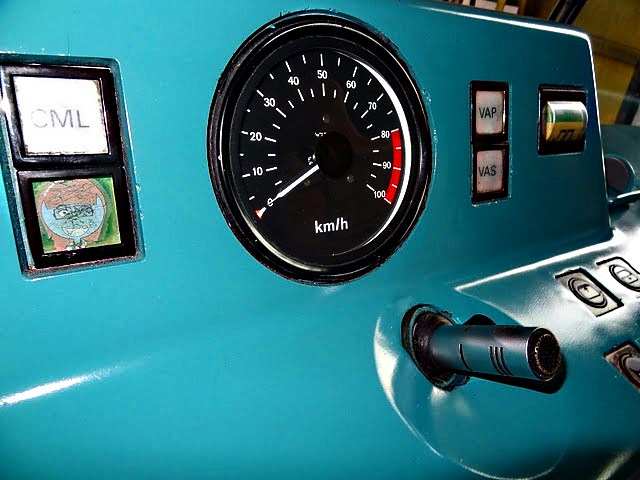
Dashboard

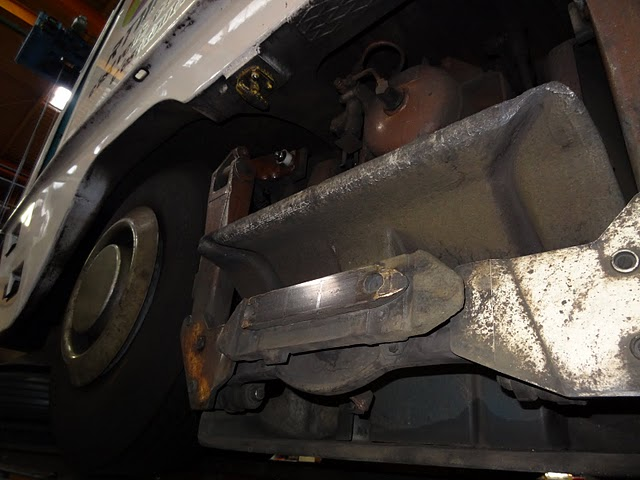
A "wiper" to capture electricity

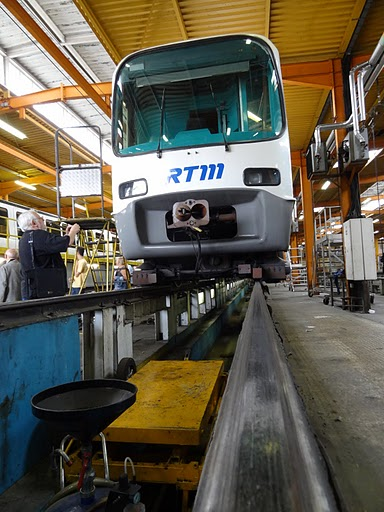
A train under maintenance at La Rose

== Future ==
The reform of MPM 76 trains and their replacement by more modern trains is under study for the horizon 2020.

== See also ==
- Marseille Metro
