= Canebière =

Thoroughfare in Marseille, France

Coordinates: 43°17′51″N 5°22′50″E

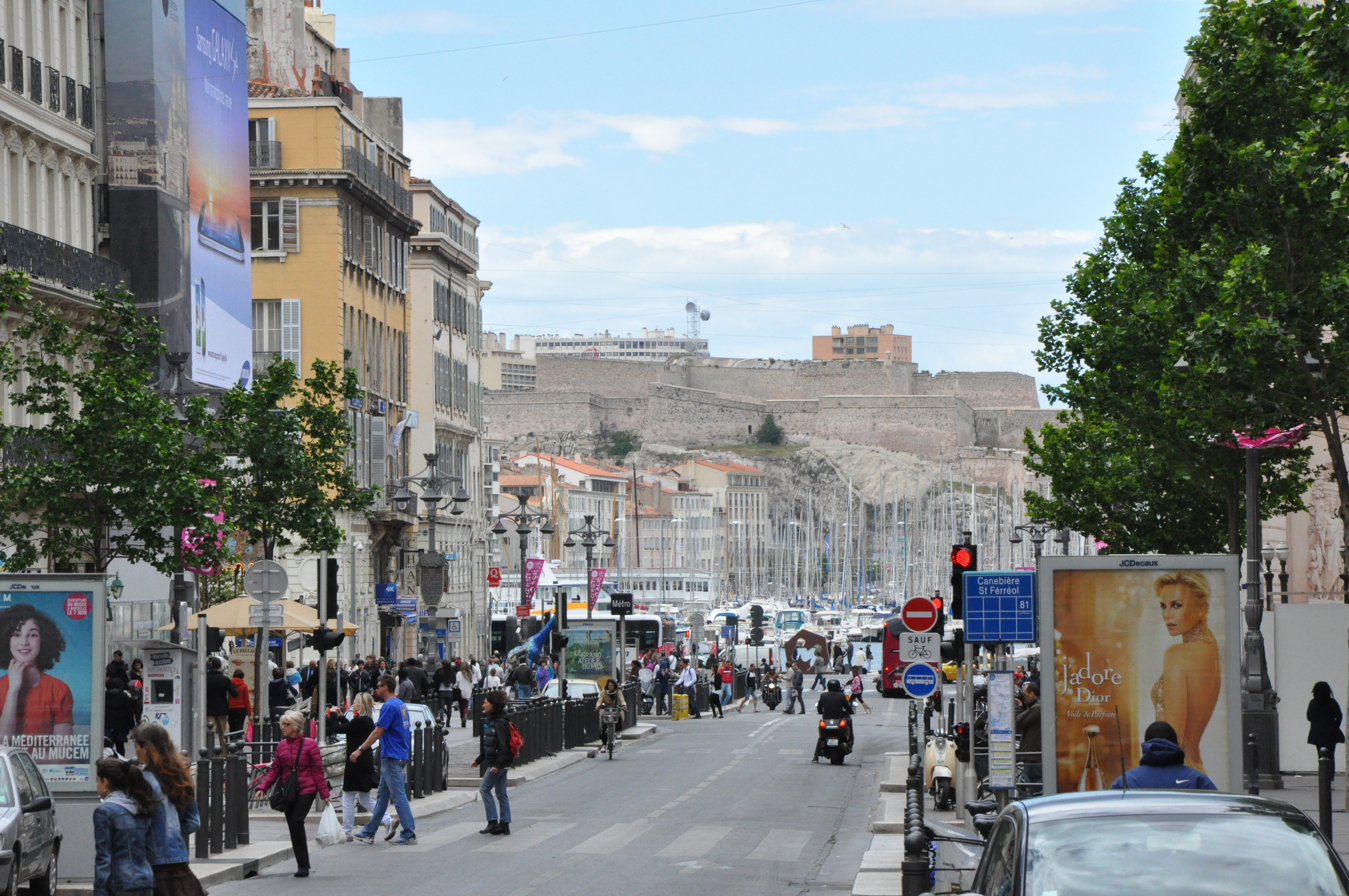
Canebière

La Canebière (Occitan: La Canebièra) is a historic high street in the old quarter of Marseille, France.

== Location ==
About a kilometre long, it runs from the Old Port to the Réformés quarter. It has been called the "Champs-Élysées of Marseille".

== Toponymy ==
The name 'Canebière' ('Canabiera' in Provençal dialect) comes from the word Cannabis in Latin, as the area around the Old Port were originally hemp fields and Marseille was one of the world's largest trader of hemp baskets and ropes from the Middle Ages until the 1930s, when other fibers were used instead.

== History ==
The avenue was built in 1666, when King Louis XIV decided to expand the city of Marseille.

At the end of the eighteenth century, as the Grand Arsenal shipbuilding dock was demolished, the avenue was extended down to the Old Port and elegant buildings were built. Only as late as 1928 was it extended from the Old Port to the Église Saint-Vincent-de-Paul (also known as the Église des Réformés).

During the era of the Third Republic, it became a haven for high society, with many cafés, luxury hotels and boutiques, and music hall performances. However, it was marred by the assassination of King Alexander I of Yugoslavia on the avenue on 9 October 1934. That day, French foreign minister Louis Barthou was fatally wounded as a result of this incident. Moreover, on 28 October 1938, the Nouvelles Galeries store was destroyed by fire, killing 75. The tragedy led to the reorganisation of Marseille's firefighters battalion, and the mayor, Henri Tasso, was dismissed.

The avenue fell in disarray by the 1960s. In recent years, it has been refurbished.

The new Line T2 of the Tramway de Marseille runs along La Canebière between Rue de Rome/Cours Belsunce and Réformés. Noailles (M2) and Vieux-Port (M1) metro stations are located along the street.

On 8 May 2017, the city of Marseille organized a "Bal Patriotique" (English: "Patriotic Ball") on the Canebière to commemorate the anniversary of the Liberation of France which occurred on 8 May 1945. A similar ball was organized in 2016.
