= La Bouilladisse =

Commune in Provence-Alpes-Côte d'Azur, France

- Commune
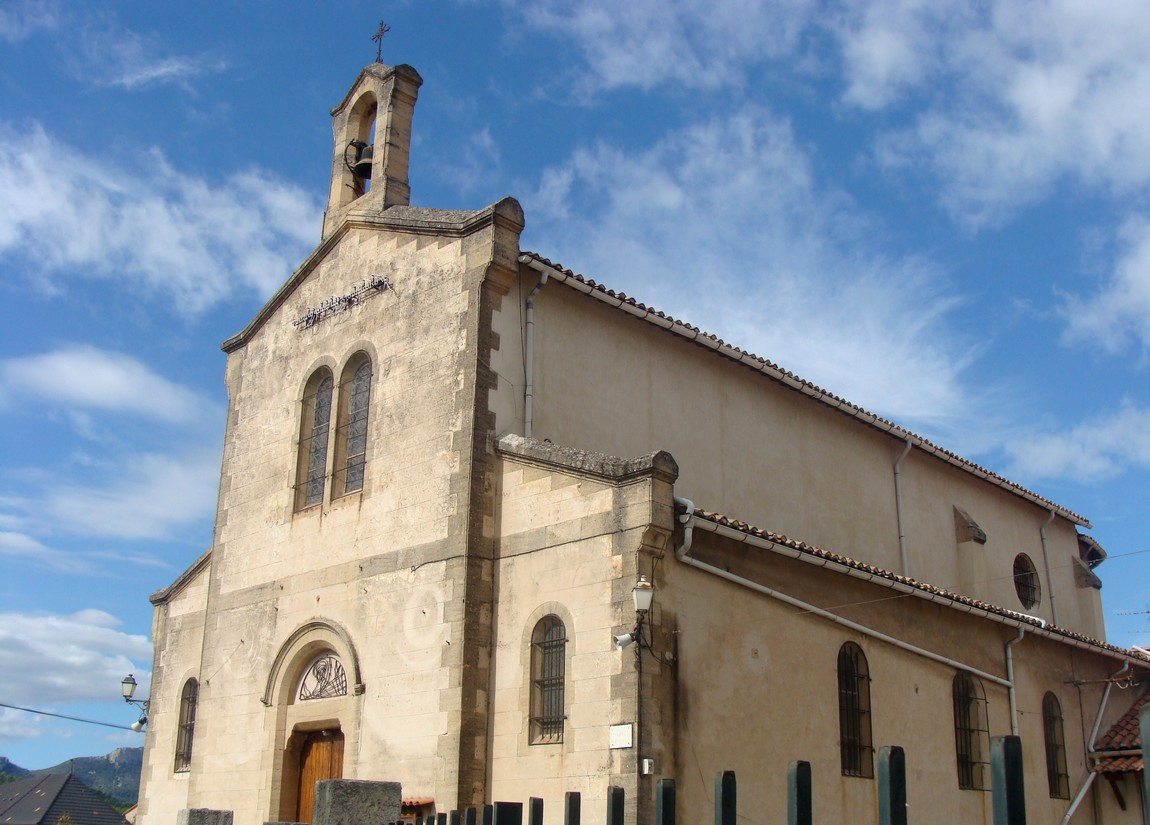
- Église de la Bouilladisse

- Coat of arms
- Location of La Bouilladisse
- Location within France Location within Provence-Alpes-Côte d'Azur
- Coordinates: 43°23′43″N 5°35′43″E
- Country: France
- Region: Provence-Alpes-Côte d'Azur
- Department: Bouches-du-Rhône
- Arrondissement: Marseille
- Canton: Allauch
- Intercommunality: Aix-Marseille-Provence

Government
  - Mayor (2026–32): Ambrozio Dolfi
- Area^{1}: 12.61 km^{2} (4.87 sq mi)
- Highest elevation: 686 m (2,251 ft)
- Lowest elevation: 193 m (633 ft)
- Population (2023): 6,547
  - Density: 519.2/km^{2} (1,345/sq mi)
- Time zone: UTC+01:00 (CET)
  - Summer (DST): UTC+02:00 (CEST)
- INSEE/Postal code: 13016 /13720
- ^{1} French Land Register data, which excludes lakes, ponds, glaciers > 1 km^{2} (0.386 sq mi or 247 acres) and river estuaries.

La Bouilladisse (French pronunciation: [la bujadis]; Occitan: Bolhadissa) is a commune in the Bouches-du-Rhône department in the Provence-Alpes-Côte d'Azur region of Southern France.

== Geography ==
A small residential town of forestry, farming and a little light industry situated in the valley of the small river Merlançon, some 14 miles (23 km) northeast of Marseille at the junction of the D8 with the D45e and D96 roads. The A52 autoroute skirts the south-western border of the commune's territory. In 2025, La Bouilladisse will be served by two stations of the Aubagne tramway after the northern extension of Line T is completed.

== History ==
The commune was created on 6 July 1880 as La Bourine, when it was separated from the neighbouring village of Auriol. It adopted its current name on 20 January 1910.

== Population ==
Historical population

Year	Pop.	±% p.a.
1881	1,378	—
1886	1,315	−0.93%
1891	1,304	−0.17%
1896	1,236	−1.07%
1901	1,329	+1.46%
1906	1,410	+1.19%
1911	1,332	−1.13%
1921	1,243	−0.69%
1926	1,521	+4.12%
1931	1,575	+0.70%
1936	1,400	−2.33%
1946	1,507	+0.74%

Year	Pop.	±% p.a.
1954	1,601	+0.76%
1962	1,715	+0.86%
1968	1,959	+2.24%
1975	2,231	+1.87%
1982	3,117	+4.89%
1990	4,115	+3.53%
1999	4,904	+1.97%
2007	5,652	+1.79%
2012	6,022	+1.28%
2017	6,194	+0.56%
2023	6,547	+0.93%

Source: EHESS and INSEE (1968-2023)

== Sights ==
- The church of St.Laurent, dating from the twentieth century.
- The chapel of La Bourine, dating from the eighteenth century.
- The two 18th-century châteaux of Velin-Tournon and La Malvesine.

== See also ==
- Communes of the Bouches-du-Rhône department
