= Transport in Marseille =

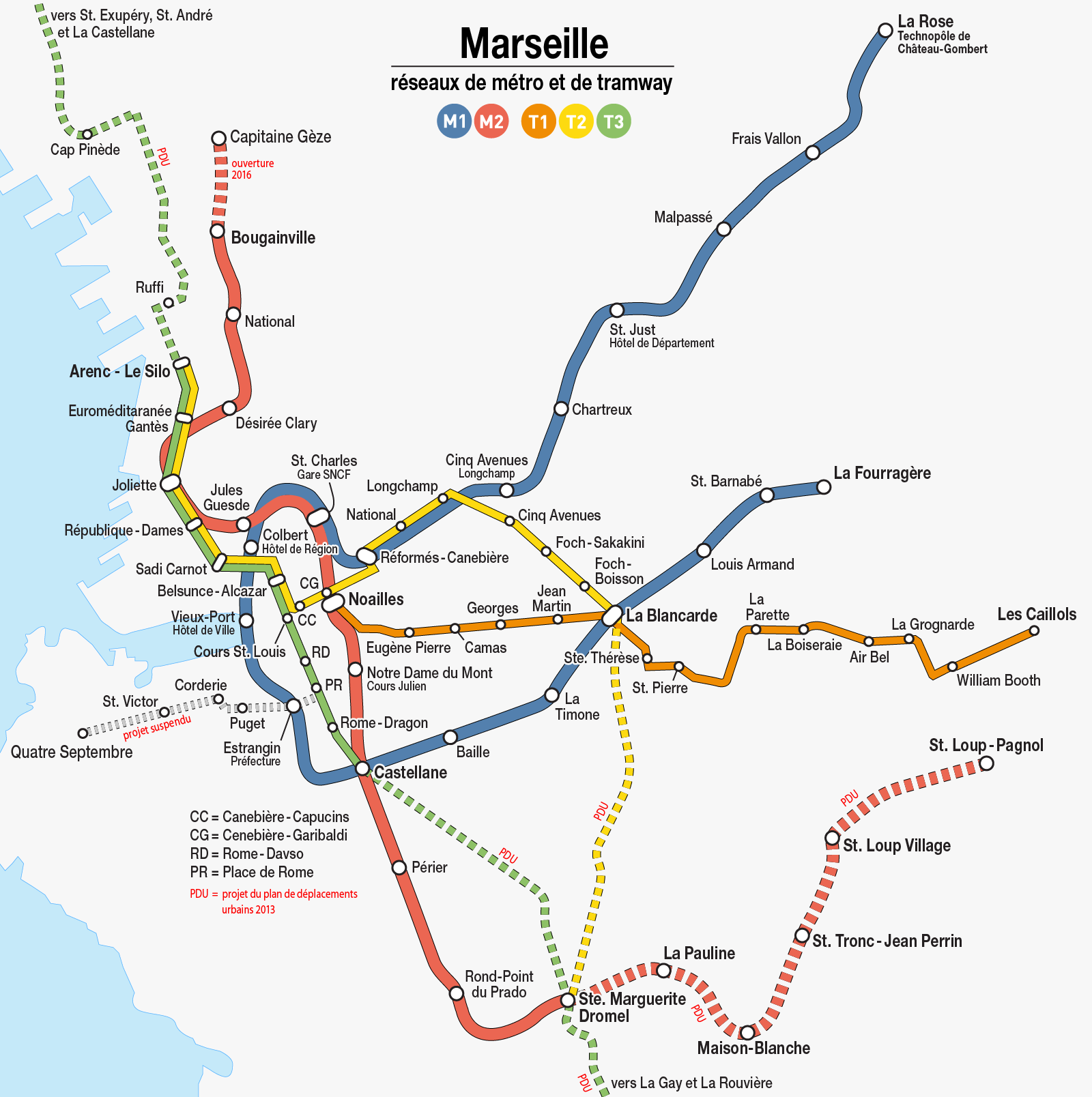
Metro and tramway network

Public transport in Marseille is managed by the Régie des transports Métropolitains (Metropolitan Transportation Public Operator, known as RTM). In 2011, there were 159 million trips, averaging 600,000 trips each weekday.

== Régie des transports métropolitains ==
In 2001, the RTM governance moved from the City of Marseille to the Communauté urbaine Marseille Provence Métropole. It employs 3,385 people. Marseille is one of the few French cities to directly operate its transit network without resorting to public service delegation. RTM is chaired since June 2008 by Karim Zéribi, Community Advisor to the urban community.

== Roads ==
An extensive network of motorways connects Marseille to the north and west (A7), Aix-en-Provence in the north (A51), Toulon (A50) and the French Riviera (A8) to the east.

== Airports ==
The city is served by an international airport, Marseille Provence Airport, located in Marignane. The airport is the fifth busiest French airport, and known the fourth most important European traffic growth in 2012.

== Tramway ==
Marseille tram is projected to be linked to the Aubagne tramway around 2020.

== Bus ==
The bus network consists of 104 bus lines operating from 4:30 to 21:30. As of June 2011, RTM has a total of 633 buses, 2 driving school cars and 1 preventing bus, of a 7.5 years old average.

=== Maintenance centres ===
The bus rolling stock of the RTM is stored and maintained in several sites within the city. They each have their own sheds, pits and tow trucks:

- The Rose Center Bus (northeast of the city lines ) which is the central shed
- Bus Centre Saint-Pierre (east Central lines)
- Centre Bus Arenc (north of the city lines)
- Capelette Bus Centre (south of the city lines)

== Bus rapid transit ==
Three bus rapid transit lines are being constructed as a way to make the metro more efficient and attractive. The lines will connect places to the terminus metro stations (Castellane -> Luminy; Capitaine Gèze - La Cabucelle -> Vallon des Tuves; La Rose -> Château Gombert - Saint Jérome).

== Ferry ==
A free ferry service operates between the two opposite quays of the Old Port. From 2011 ferry shuttle services operate between the Old Port and Pointe Rouge; from April 13 it will also run to l'Estaque. The service operates from 7am to 7pm from march to October (until 10pm between May 15 - September 15). There are also ferry services and boat trips available from the Old Port to Frioul, the Calanques and Cassis.

== Bicycle sharing system ==
As in many other French cities, Marseille has a bicycle sharing system named "Le vélo", free for trips of less than half an hour. It was introduced by the city council in 2007.

== Statistics ==
Traffic statistics
| Transport mode | 2011 trips | 2011 traffic share |
|---|---|---|
| Bus | 69.5 M | 43.4% |
| Metro | 74.46 M | 46.8% |
| Tramway | 15.54 M | 9.8% |
| Total | 159 M | 100% |

=== Marseille Public Transportation Statistics ===
The average amount of time people spend commuting with public transit in Marseille & Provence, for example to and from work, on a weekday is 47 min. 12.7% of public transit riders, ride for more than 2 hours every day. The average amount of time people wait at a stop or station for public transit is 14 min, while 19.4% of riders wait for over 20 minutes on average every day. The average distance people usually ride in a single trip with public transit is 9 km, while 21% travel for over 12 km in a single direction.
