= Calanques National Park =

French national park in Bouches-du-Rhône

- Parc national des Calanques
- IUCN category II (national park)
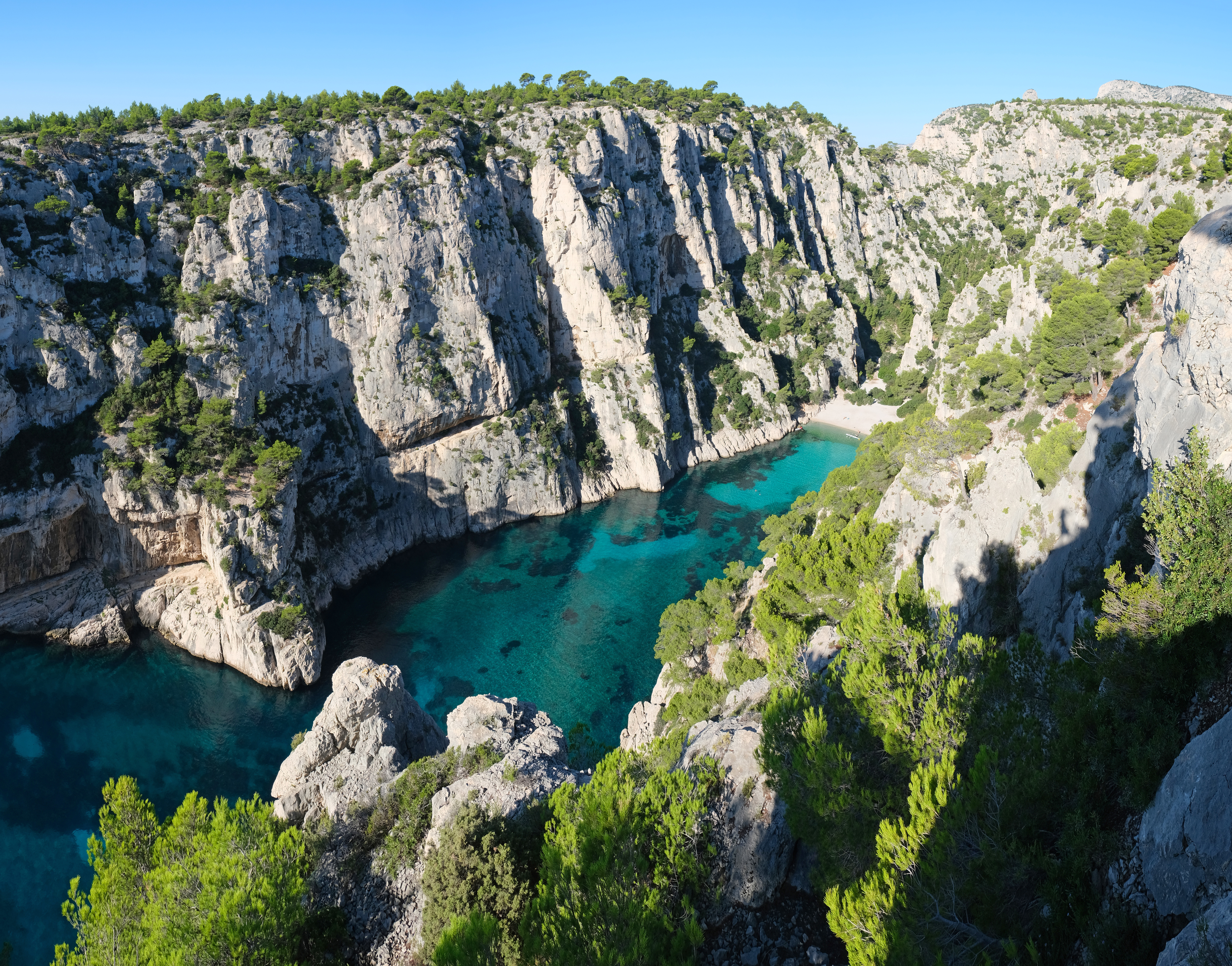
- A view of the Calanque d'En-Vau

- Location within France
- Location: Bouches-du-Rhône, France
- Nearest city: Marseille
- Coordinates: 43°13′N 5°28′E
- Area: 520 km^{2} (201 sq mi)
- Established: 18 April 2012
- Governing body: Parcs nationaux de France
- Website: www.calanques-parcnational.fr

Calanques National Park (French: Parc national des Calanques; Occitan: Parc Nacional dels Calanques) is a French national park located on the Mediterranean coast in Bouches-du-Rhône, Southern France, slightly west of the French Riviera.

Established in 2012, it extends over 520 km^{2} (201 sq mi), of which 85 km^{2} (33 sq mi) is land, while the remaining is marine area. It includes parts of the Massif des Calanques stretching between Marseille's southern arrondissements, Cassis and La Ciotat. Some of the park's best known features include the calanques of Sormiou, Morgiou, Port-Miou, Sugiton, En-Vau, as well as the Cosquer Cave.

== History ==
In 1923, the Comité de défense des Calanques was established with the aim of preventing industrial development at En-Vau. In 1999, the groupement d'intérêt public (GIP) des Calanques was founded to prepare the creation of a national park. Eleven years later, the GIP presented its first draft for a national park; the third draft was approved in 2011. On 18 April 2012, Prime Minister François Fillon signed the decree establishing Calanques National Park.

== Gallery ==
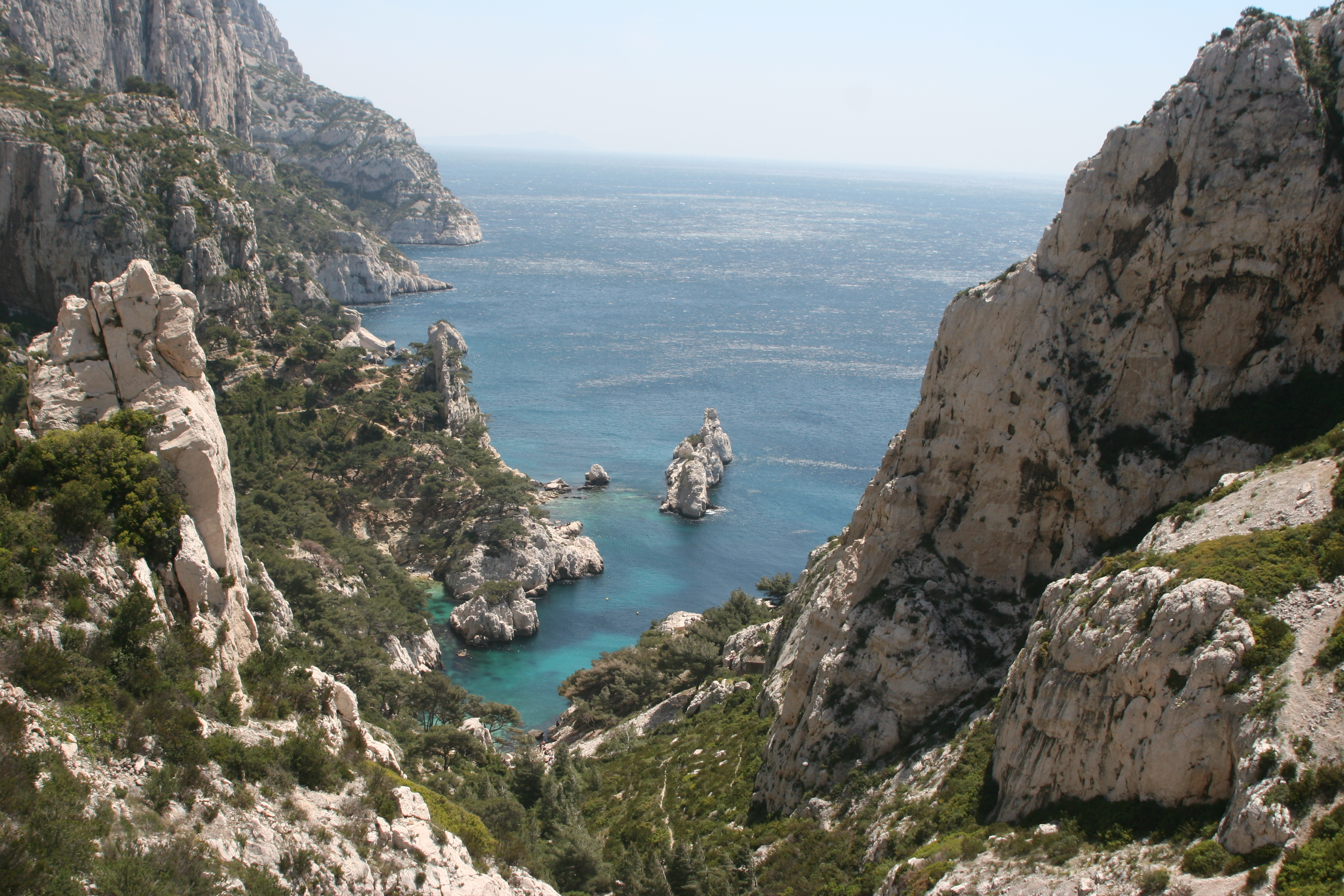
Sugiton

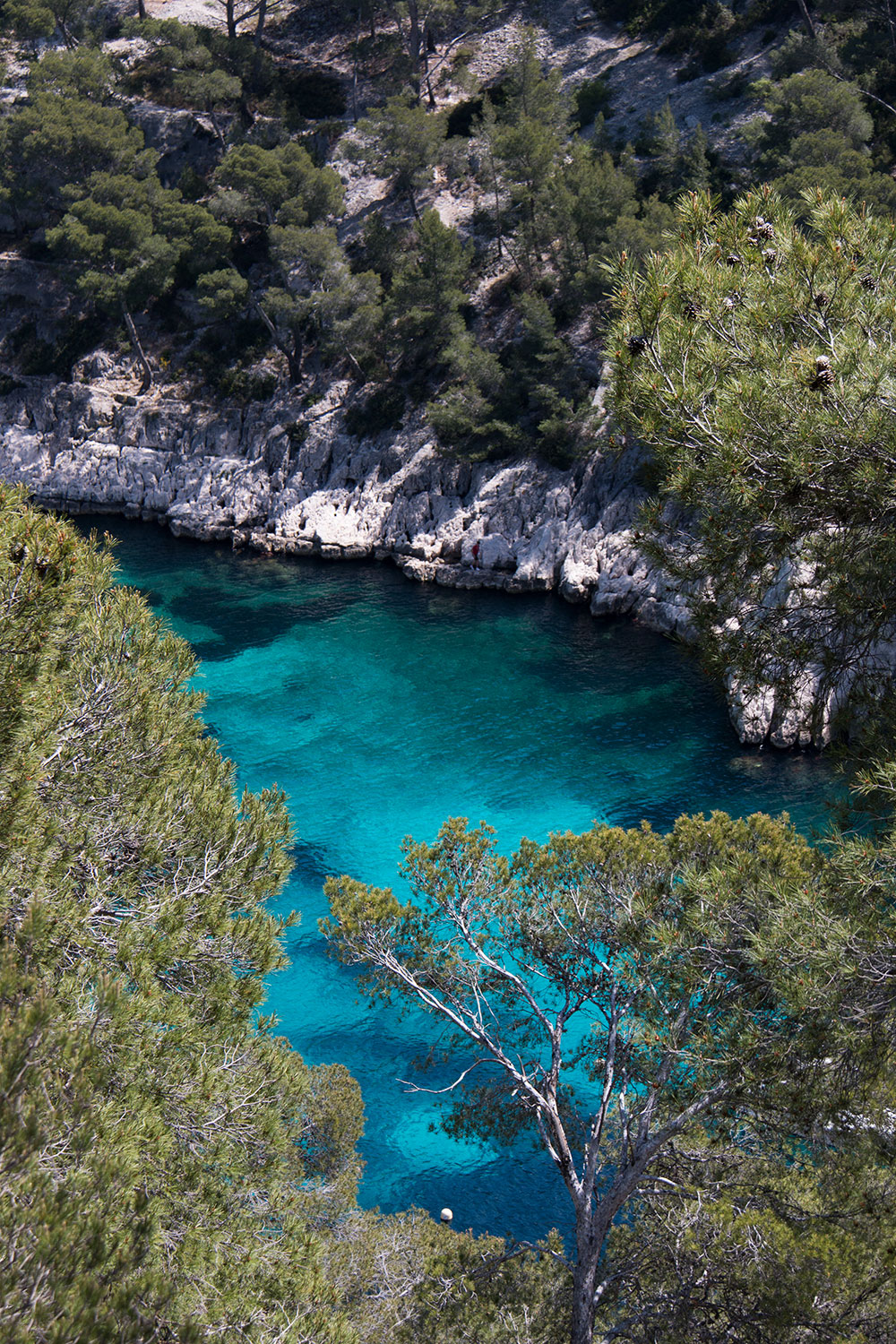
Morgiou

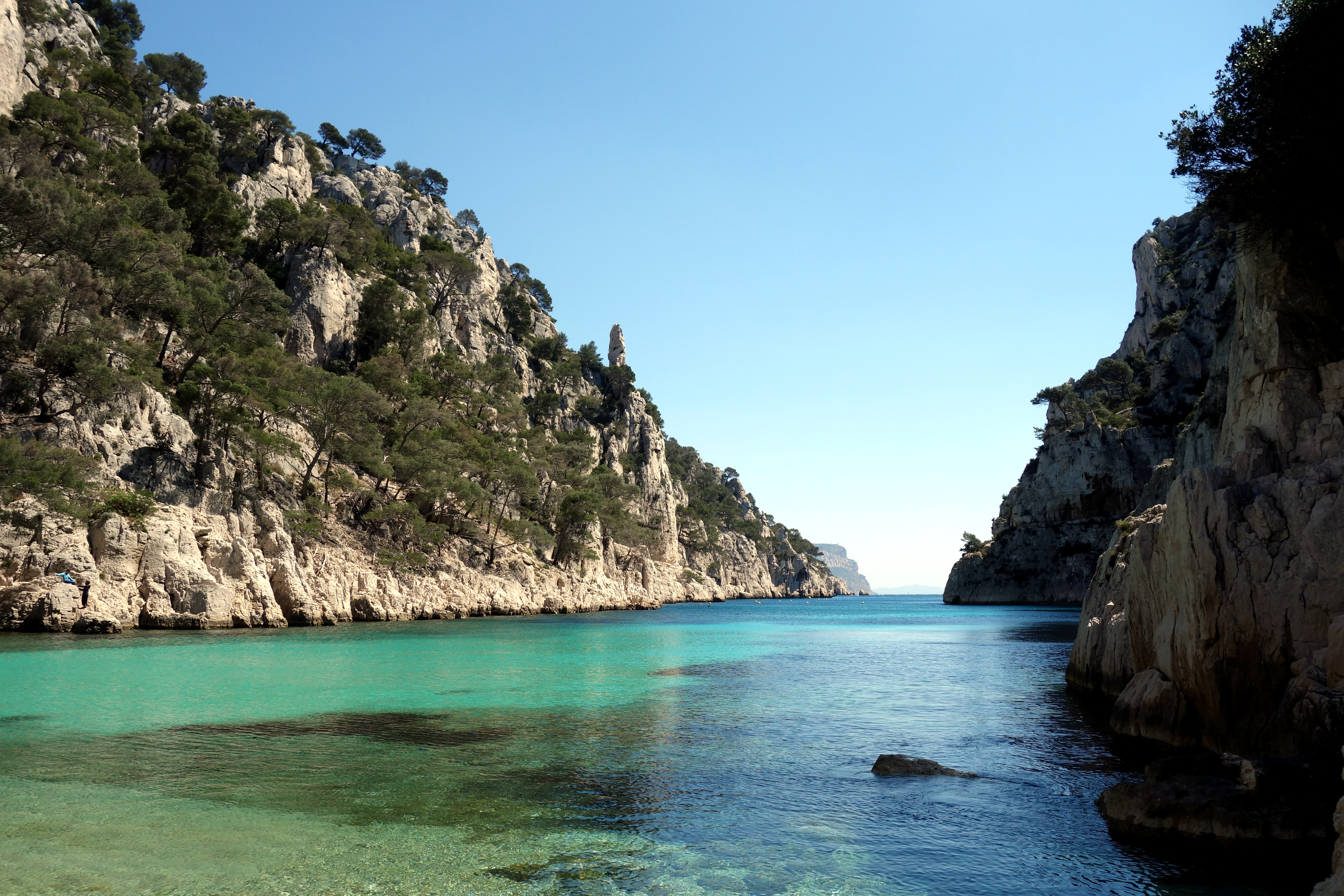
En-Vau

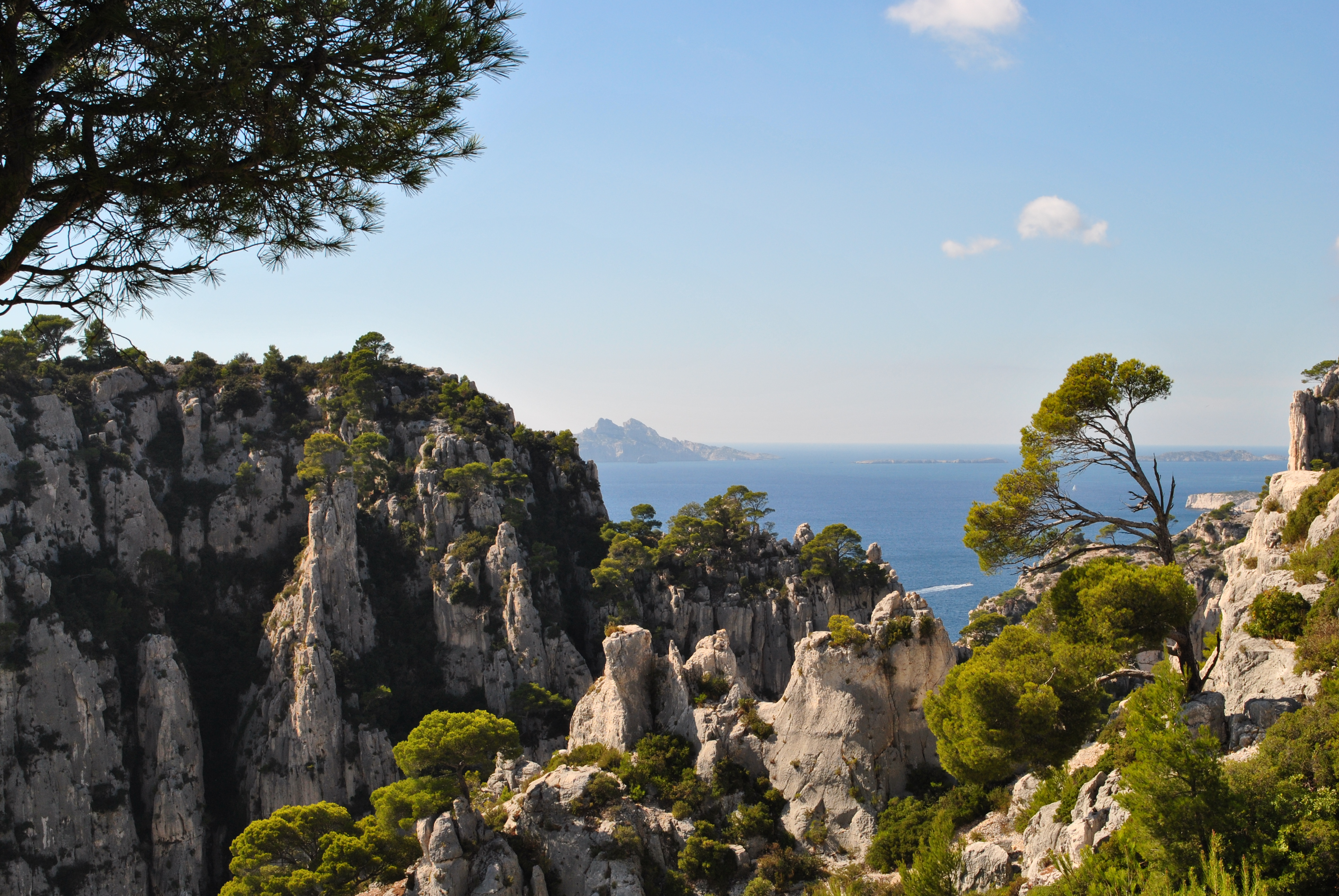
Belvédère
