= HMS Undaunted (1807) =

Frigate of the Royal Navy

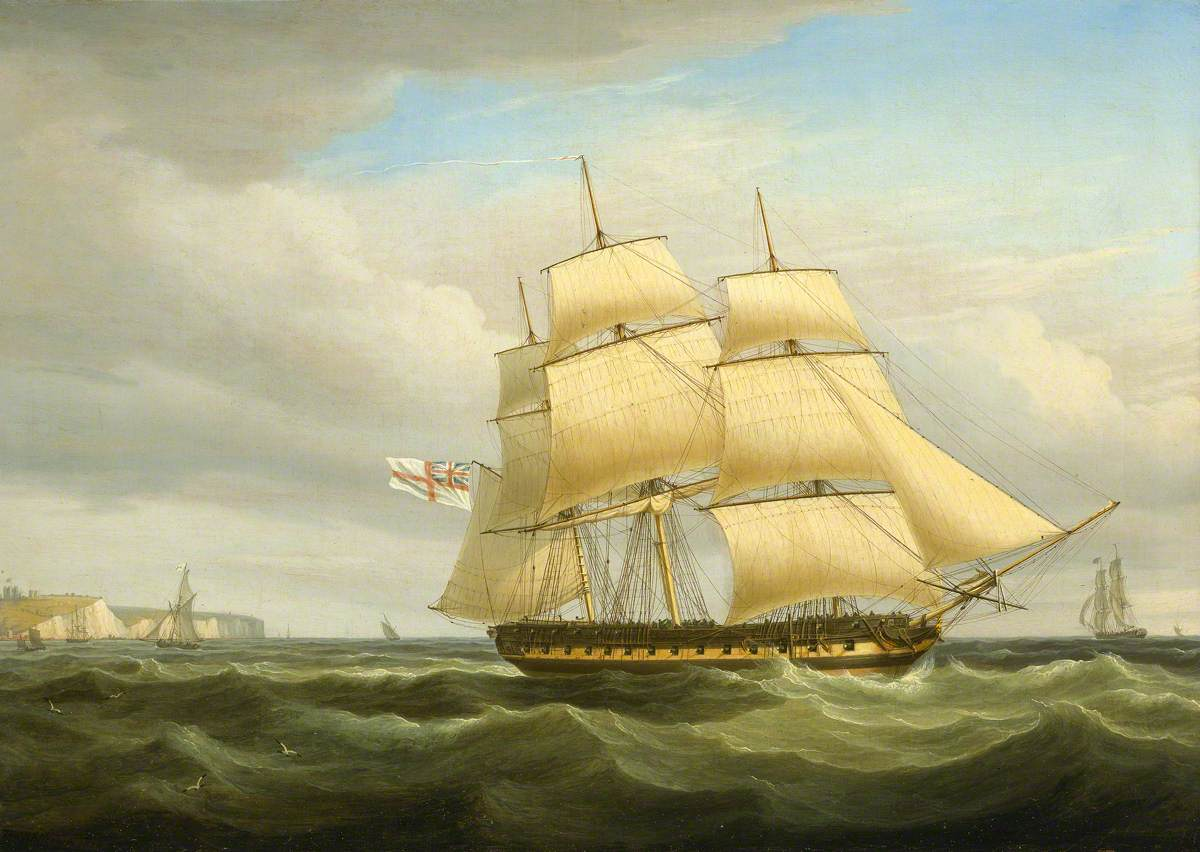
- HMS Undaunted off Dover, by Thomas Whitcombe

History

United Kingdom
- Name: HMS Undaunted
- Ordered: 7 November 1803
- Builder: Woolwich Dockyard
- Laid down: April 1806
- Launched: 17 October 1807
- Completed: 2 December 1807
- Commissioned: October 1807
- Decommissioned: October 1815
- Recommissioned: August 1827
- Decommissioned: February 1834
- Fate: Broken up, 1860

General characteristics
- Class & type: Lively-class frigate
- Tons burthen: 1,086 tons bm
- Length: 154 ft 9 in (47.17 m) (gundeck); 130 ft 3.75 in (39.7193 m) (keel)
- Beam: 39 ft 7 in (12.07 m)
- Draught: 10 ft 6 in (3.20 m) (forward); 14 ft 6 in (4.42 m) (aft)
- Depth of hold: 13 ft 6 in (4.11 m)
- Sail plan: Full-rigged ship
- Complement: 284
- Armament: In 1807; FC: 2 × 9-pounder guns + 2 × 32-pounder carronades; QD: 2 × 9-pounder guns + 12 × 32-pounder carronades; UD: 28 × 18-pounder guns

HMS Undaunted was a Lively-class fifth-rate 38-gun sailing frigate of the British Royal Navy, built during the Napoleonic Wars, which conveyed Napoleon to his first exile on the island of Elba in early 1814.

== Construction ==
The sixteen ships of the Lively-class were based on a design dating from 1799 by William Rule, the Surveyor of the Navy, and were probably the most successful British frigate design of the time. Undaunted was originally ordered on 7 November 1803 from Joseph Graham at Harwich, but he went bankrupt, and the contract was transferred to Woolwich Dockyard on 6 January 1806. The keel was laid down in April 1806 under the supervision of naval constructor Edward Sison. Undaunted was launched on 17 October 1807, and completed on 2 December 1807 at a total cost of £36,967.

== Service history ==
=== Napoleonic wars ===
Captain Thomas James Maling was appointed to command her on 27 October 1807. The ship served in the West Indies and the English Channel, and was for a time in early 1810 engaged in the defence of Cádiz.

During this time she made two notable captures; on 29 February 1808 the Spanish ship Nostra Senora del Carmen, alias La Baladora, and on 12 February 1809, the French privateer San Josephe in the Channel. Undaunted discovered San Josephe at dawn, taking her after a chase lasting four hours, and brought her into Spithead the next day. The privateer, which was only four days out from St. Malo, was provisioned for two months and pierced for 18 guns, but mounted only 14, with a crew of 96. (Note: The prize money for San Josephe was paid out in May 1810, and Captain Maling's share amounted to £1,078 1s 5d (about four times his annual pay), while the commissioned officers received £134 15s 2d, the warrant officers £59 17s 10d, and the rest of the crew between £21 0s 9d and £2 6s 9d dependent on rating.) The Royal Navy took San Josephe into service as Magnet.

In June 1810 command of the ship passed from Captain Maling to Captain George Charles Mackenzie. On 30 August 1810 she sailed with a convoy for Malta. Under Captain Mackenzie her career appears to have been less eventful, but on 17 February 1811 Undaunted did recapture the transport ship Dorothy just before command passed to Captain Richard Thomas. Under Captain Thomas, Undaunted was sent to the Mediterranean, where she was first employed in co-operating with Spanish guerillas on the coast of Catalonia, and later at the blockade of Marseille, and was for a time the flagship of the small squadron blockading Toulon. On 29 April 1812 the boats of Undaunted, the frigate Volontaire, and the sloop Blossom attacked a convoy of 26 French vessels near the mouth of the river Rhone. Led by Lieutenant Eagar of Undaunted, they captured seven vessels, burned twelve, and left two grounded on the beach. A French Navy schooner armed with four 18-pounders and a crew of 74 was among the vessels burnt. The attack was carried out without loss, being protected by Captain Stewart in Blossom. Captain Thomas was eventually invalided home, and command of Undaunted passed to Captain Thomas Ussher on 2 February 1813.

Under Captain Ussher's command Undaunted was continually employed on the southern coast of France for the next two years, making numerous attacks on ships and fortifications.

- On 18 February 1813 Undaunted captured the San Nicolo, with Volontaire present, and thus taking a share of the prize money.
- On 18 March 1813 boats from Undaunted under the command of Lieutenant Aaron Tozer, landed near Carri, west of Marseille, and attacked a shore battery. Undaunted's marines drove out the occupants at the point of the bayonet, and then destroyed four 24-pounder long guns, a 6-pounder field gun, and a 13-inch mortar, before capturing a tartan that was anchored nearby. Two men from Undaunted were killed and one wounded.
- On 29 March 1813 Volontaire, Undaunted, and the brig-sloop Redwing, observed 14 merchant vessels sheltering under the protection of two shore batteries at Morgiou. That night a large party of seamen and Marines, under the command of Lieutenant Shaw were landed at Sormiou, and attacked the batteries from the rear at dawn. The 40 enemy troops there made only a partial resistance, and were soon overcome. They suffered 4 killed and 5 wounded, and 17 prisoners, a lieutenant and 16 men of the 62nd Regiment were taken prisoner, while the rest escaped. The five 36-pounder guns in one battery, and two 24-pounders in the other, were thrown into the sea, a mortar was spiked, and all the ammunition destroyed. Meanwhile, boats under the command of Lieutenant Syer, protected by the Redwing under Sir John Sinclair, succeeded in capturing 11 merchant vessels, all tartans or settees ranging between 25 and 45 tons, mainly laden with oil, and destroyed one other loaded, and two empty, which were driven aground. Only the approach of French troops from Marseille prevented any further operations. Volontaire only had two seamen wounded, while Undaunted had one marine killed, and two marines severely wounded.
- On 2 May 1813, after observing that the French were rebuilding the batteries at Morgiou the 74-gun ship Repulse, under the command of Captain Richard Hussey Mowbray, along with Undaunted, Volontaire, and Redwing, mounted another attack. One hundred Marines, along with seamen from the ships, covered by the fire of Redwing, landed in boats armed with carronades and drove the enemy—a detachment of the 4th Battalion of the 1st Regiment—away into the hills, and kept them there while the batteries, containing nine gun carriages and a 13-inch mortar, were destroyed with explosives. Meanwhile, the ships launches captured a number of vessels in the bay below. The French suffered at least twelve killed, and several prisoners were taken, at a cost of only two men killed, and four wounded from Undaunted and Volontaire. In 1847 a clasp to the Naval General Service Medal marked "2 May Boat Service 1813" was awarded to the surviving members of the crews of Repulse, Undaunted, Volontaire, and Redwing who took part.
- On 18 August 1813 Undaunted, Redwing, and the 16-gun brig-sloop Kite, launched an attack on the strongly-defended port of Cassis, east of Marseille. They were reinforced by boats and men from the ships Caledonia, Hibernia, Barfleur, and Prince of Wales, from Sir Edward Pellew's fleet. Light winds meant that Undaunted was unable to take her assigned position, but the smaller Redwing and Kite entered the bay using their sweeps. The entrance of the bay was covered by four batteries and two gun-boats were moored across the entrance of the port. While a party of Marines and seamen captured the main battery in the Citadel by escalade, 24 settees and tartans were captured, as were two gunboats both armed with two howitzers and 12 swivels, and a gunboat and a tartan were destroyed. Sixty prisoners were taken, while the British had four men killed, and 15 wounded.
- On 9 November 1813 Undaunted and the sloop Guadeloupe attacked Port-la-Nouvelle, with the Marines storming the batteries while men from the ships captured two vessels and destroyed five. Captain Ussher noted in his report that this brought the total number of vessels taken or destroyed in the 10 months he had been in command of Undaunted up to seventy.
- On 22 December 1813 Undaunted and Euryalus sank the Baloena. Head money for the 147 men assumed to have been aboard was paid in November 1816.
- On 8 April 1814: Undaunted captured the brig Bienfaisant.

=== Napoleon's journey to Elba ===
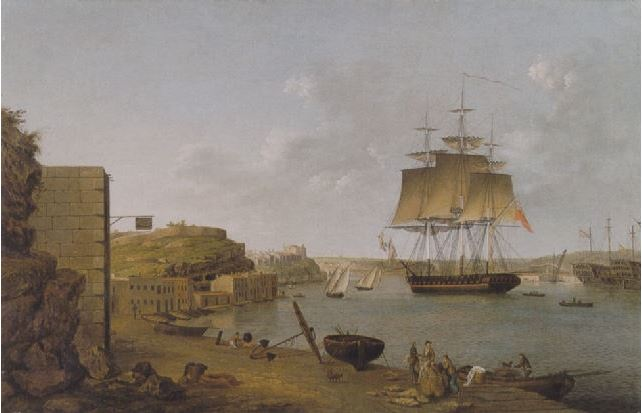
HMS Undaunted at Fréjus in France waiting to convey Napoleon to Elba, by Anton Schranz

Late on the evening of 24 April 1814, Undaunted still under command of Thomas Ussher, and Euryalus, commanded by Captain Charles Napier, were off Marseille, when they observed illuminations in the town, which obviously indicated some important event. The next morning the two ships anchored off the town, noting that the semaphore station seemed to be abandoned, and were later approached by a boat flying a flag of truce carrying the mayor and municipal officials, who informed them of the abdication of Napoleon. Captains Ussher and Napier landed to meet the military governor of the town, and during the meeting Ussher received a letter informing him that Colonel Sir Neil Campbell was also there, with orders from Lord Castlereagh in Paris to convey the former Emperor and his retinue into exile on the island of Elba. On 26 April Undaunted sailed for Saint-Tropez, and then to nearby Fréjus where Napoleon was lodged in a small hotel. On the evening of 28 April Napoleon, his various followers, and the representatives of the victorious Allies finally boarded Undaunted and set sail for Elba. She arrived there on 30 April, and Napoleon disembarked on 3 May to formally take possession of the island. Undaunted remained at Elba until the end of the month before sailing to Genoa. Captain Ussher relinquished command of Undaunted on 29 June 1814.

Captain Charles Thurlow Smith then took command of Undaunted. Following Napoleon's escape from Elba in February 1815 Undaunted and Garland, under the command of Captain Charles Austen in Phoenix, were sent into the Adriatic in pursuit of a Neapolitan squadron, supposed to be there. While Garland and Phoenix blockaded Brindisi, Undaunted patrolled the coast. On 2 May 1815 Undaunted destroyed "sundry vessels" at Tremiti, and two privateers were captured on 28 May and 4 June 1815.

=== Post-war service ===
Undaunted finally returned to Britain, and was paid off at Chatham in October 1815, and remained there kept "in ordinary" until she was recommissioned on 11 August 1827 under Captain Sir Augustus William James Clifford. She was soon employed, attending the Lord High Admiral the Duke of Clarence (later King William IV) during his official visits to Chatham and Sheerness. In 1828 Undaunted sailed for India, via the Cape of Good Hope, with Lord William Bentinck aboard as a passenger in order to take up his post as Governor-General. Undaunted return to Britain with Major-General Bourke, the former Lieutenant-Governor of the Cape aboard, and was paid off again in November 1830.

In November 1831 she was recommissioned under Captain Edward Harvey. Undaunted was employed at the Cape of Good Hope, on the African and East India stations, during which Harvey commanded a squadron at the time of an insurrection on the Île de France. The ship eventually returned to the UK. On 1 February 1834, the Undaunted ran aground off Selsey Bill, West Sussex. She was subsequently put out of commission later that year.

She was laid up at Portsmouth. On 24 November 1859, the vessel was used as a target ship during testing of molten-iron filled shells, that were intended to set their target on fire. These eventually started a fire on Undaunted that could not be put out and she was sunk with conventional shot. She was finally broken up in 1860.
