= Corniche des Crêtes =

Coastal road in Southern France

Coordinates: 43°10′46″N 5°34′34″E

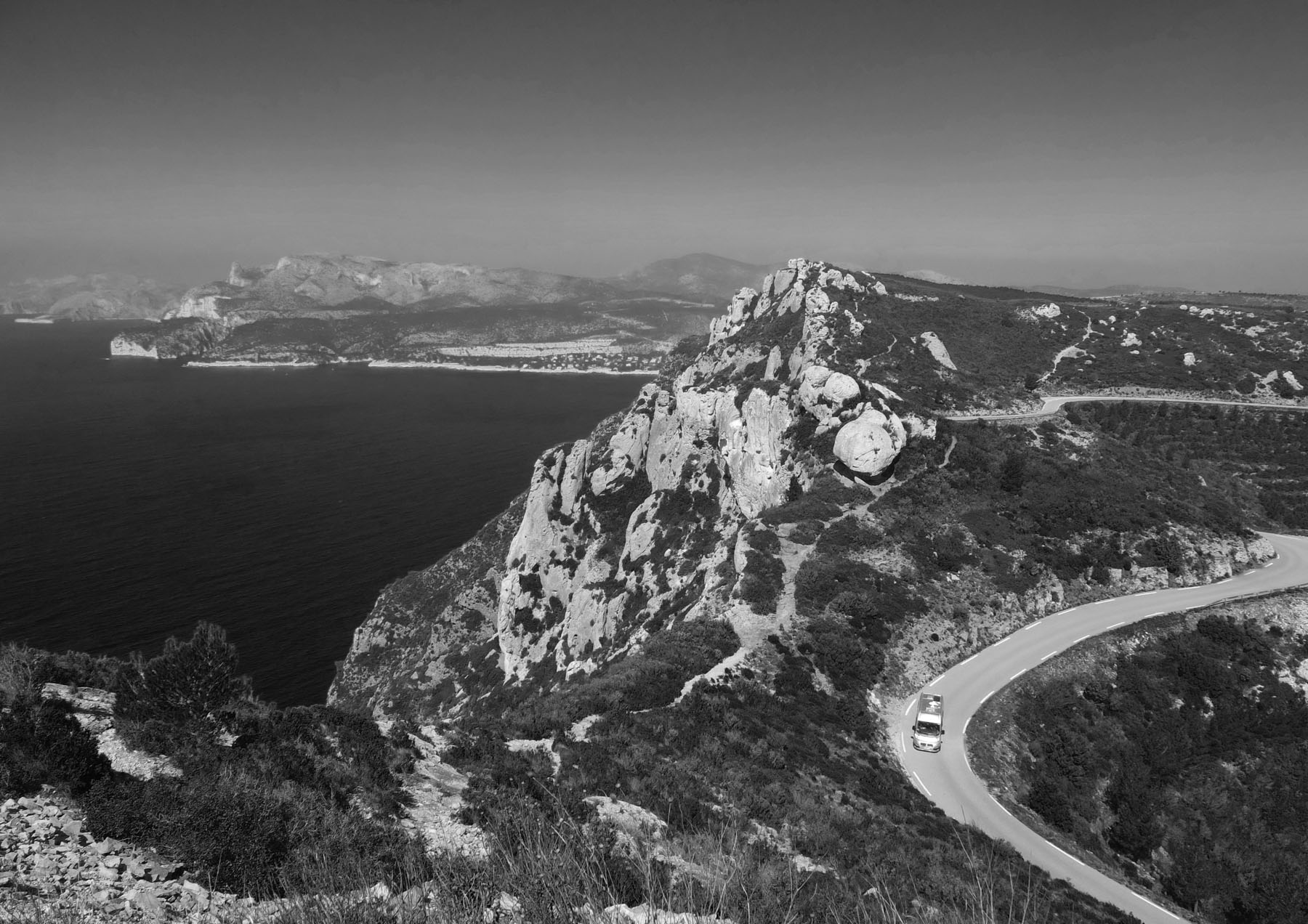
The scenic Corniche des Crêtes road crossing Cap Canaille through Calanques National Park. The Massif des Calanques appears in the background.

The Corniche des Crêtes (French pronunciation: [kɔʁniʃ de kʁɛt]; Occitan: Cornicha de Crèstas) is a narrow coastal road in Southern France, winding from Cassis to La Ciotat in Bouches-du-Rhône, along the Mediterranean shore.

== Situation ==
The road was opened to traffic in 1969; it leads along the Falaises (high cliffs) up to Cap Canaille, a cape 394 metres above sea level, the highest sea cliff in France. From there it continues to Grande Tête, an elevation which is 399 metres high.

The Corniche des Crêtes is about 15 km (9.3 mi) long and offers notable views of the sea, as well as the town of Cassis and the Calanques.

== See also ==
- Calanques National Park
