= Massif des Calanques =

Mountains in Southern France

Coordinates: 43°13′N 5°26′E

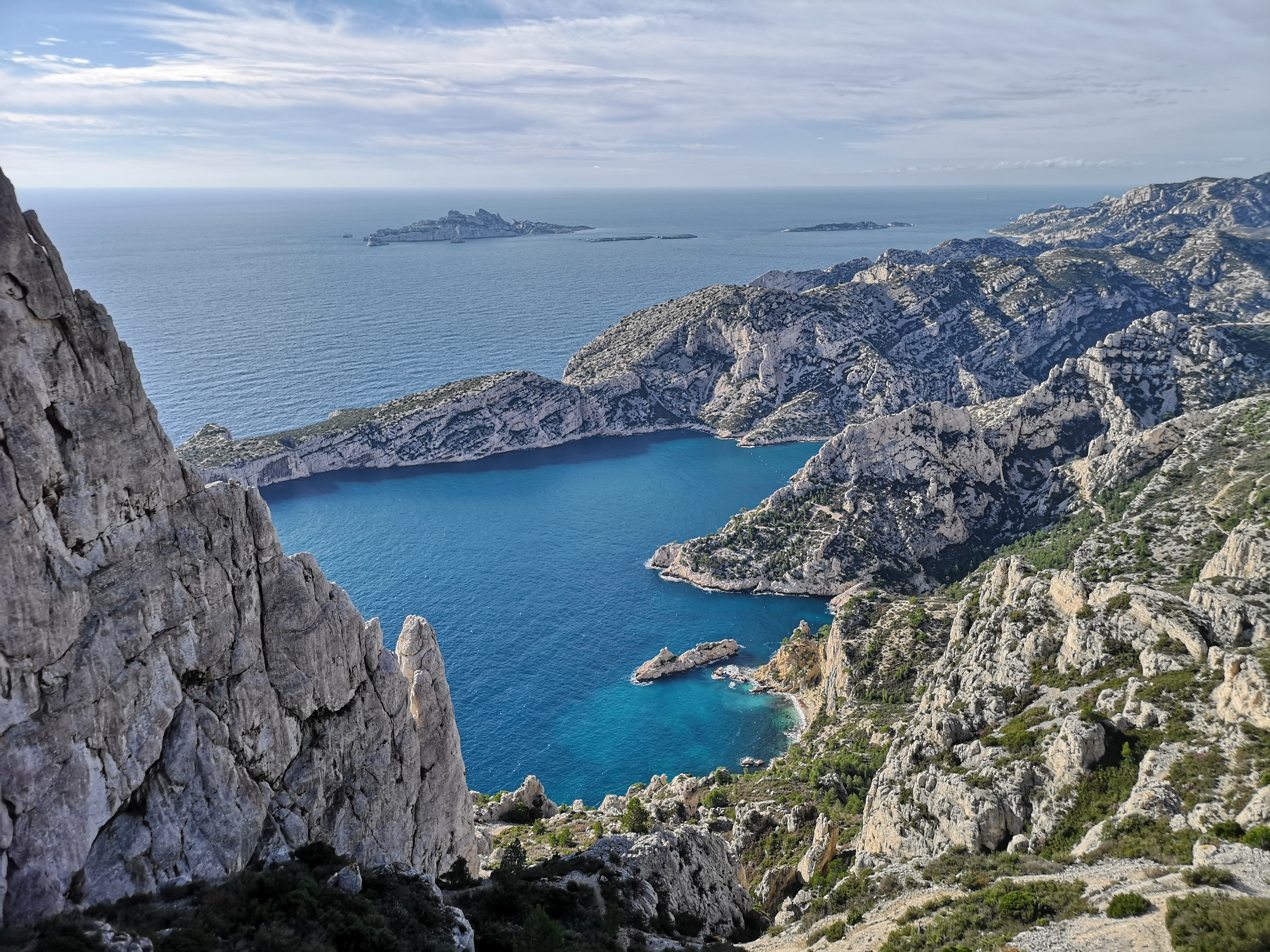
The Calanque de Sugiton in the Massif des Calanques

The Massif des Calanques (French pronunciation: [masif de kalɑ̃k]; Occitan: Massís dels Calanques) is a wild and rugged terrain stretching from the 9th arrondissement of Marseille to the east towards Cassis, spanning 20 km in length and 4 km in width along the coast. Its highest peak is Mont Puget at 565m. The area has been protected by a national park since 2012.

The massif is characterized by steep cliffs of limestone (Urgonian and dolomite) in the western part, and of a combination of limestone, sandstone and puddingstone east of Cassis.

== See also ==
- Calanque
- Calanques National Park
