= Calanque =

Narrow inlet on the Mediterranean coast

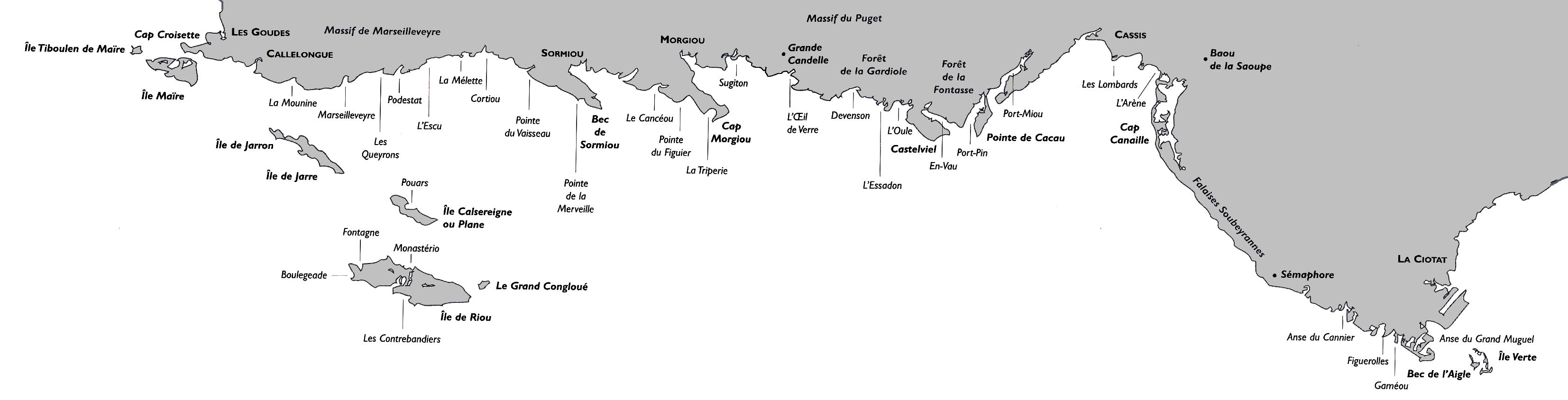
Map of the Calanques between Marseille and La Ciotat, France

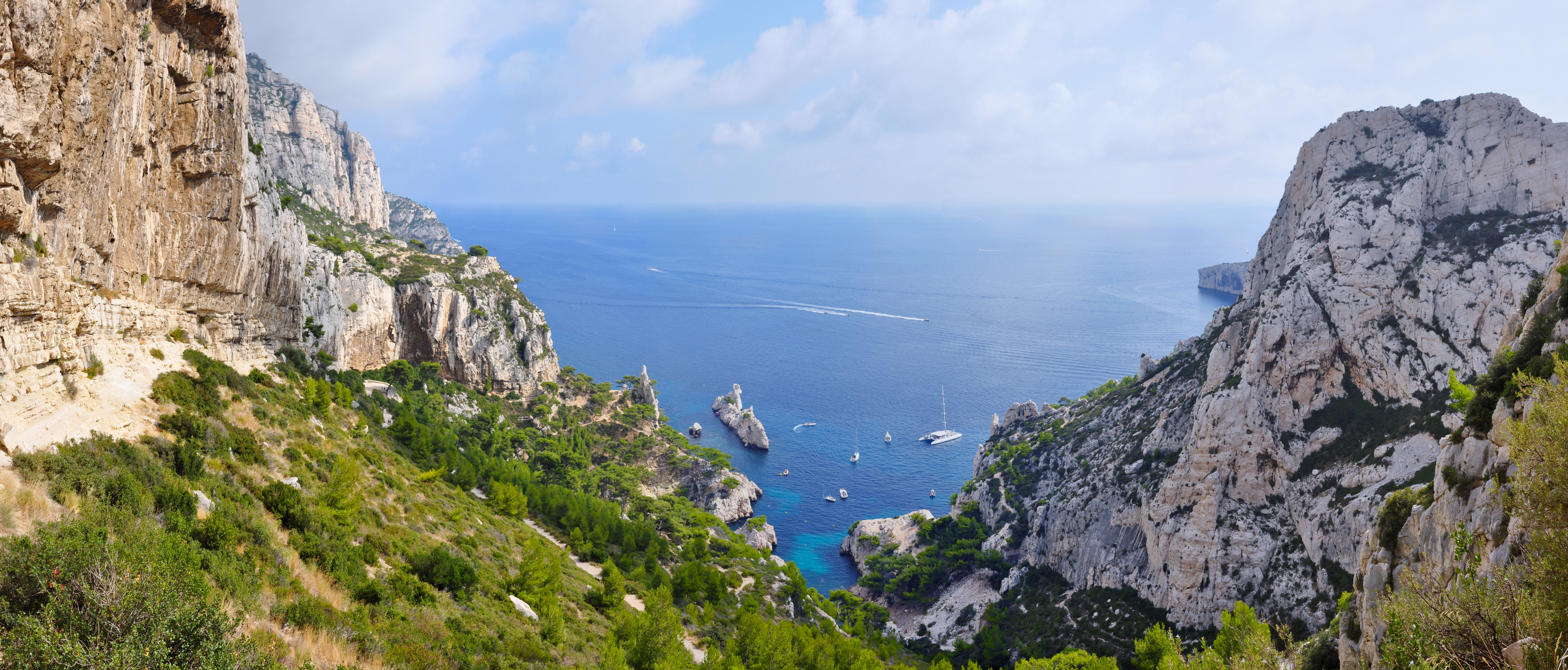
The Calanque de Sugiton is the largest located within the city limits of Marseille

A calanque (French: [kalɑ̃k], "inlet"; Corsican: calanca, plural calanche or calanchi; Occitan: calanca, plural calancas) is a narrow, steep-walled inlet that is developed in limestone, dolomite, or other carbonate strata and found along the Mediterranean coast. A calanque is a steep-sided valley formed within karstic regions either by fluvial erosion or the collapse of the roof of a cave that has been subsequently partially submerged by a rise in sea level.

== Characteristics ==
=== Location ===
The best known examples of this formation can be found in the Massif des Calanques (Massís dei calancas in Occitan, the traditional local language) in the Bouches-du-Rhône department of Southern France. The range extends for 20 km (12 mi) in length and four kilometres (2.5 mi) in width along the coast between Marseille and Cassis, culminating in Mont Puget (565 m or 1,854 ft). Similar calanques can also be found on the French Riviera near the Massif de l'Esterel and on the island of Corsica (Calanques de Piana). The highest points along the calanques are located at Mont Puget (565 m or 1,854 ft) and in the mountains of Marseilleveyre (432 m or 1,417 ft). Similarities are seen between calanques and rias, the river mouths formed along the coast of Brittany in Northern France.

The limestone calanques of the Massif des Calanques lie within the recently created Calanques National Park (2012) and include the Calanque de Sormiou, Calanque de Morgiou, Calanque de Port-Miou and Calanque de Sugiton, which is now accessible only on reservation during summer. There are additional calanques in the national park, further east along the coast, incised into Cap Canaille. These calanques formed in different rock strata, often in layers of cemented pebble conglomerate. Calanques are also present in the Italian Apennines, in locations such as the Accona Desert and in the Calanchi natural preserve of Atri.

=== Geology ===
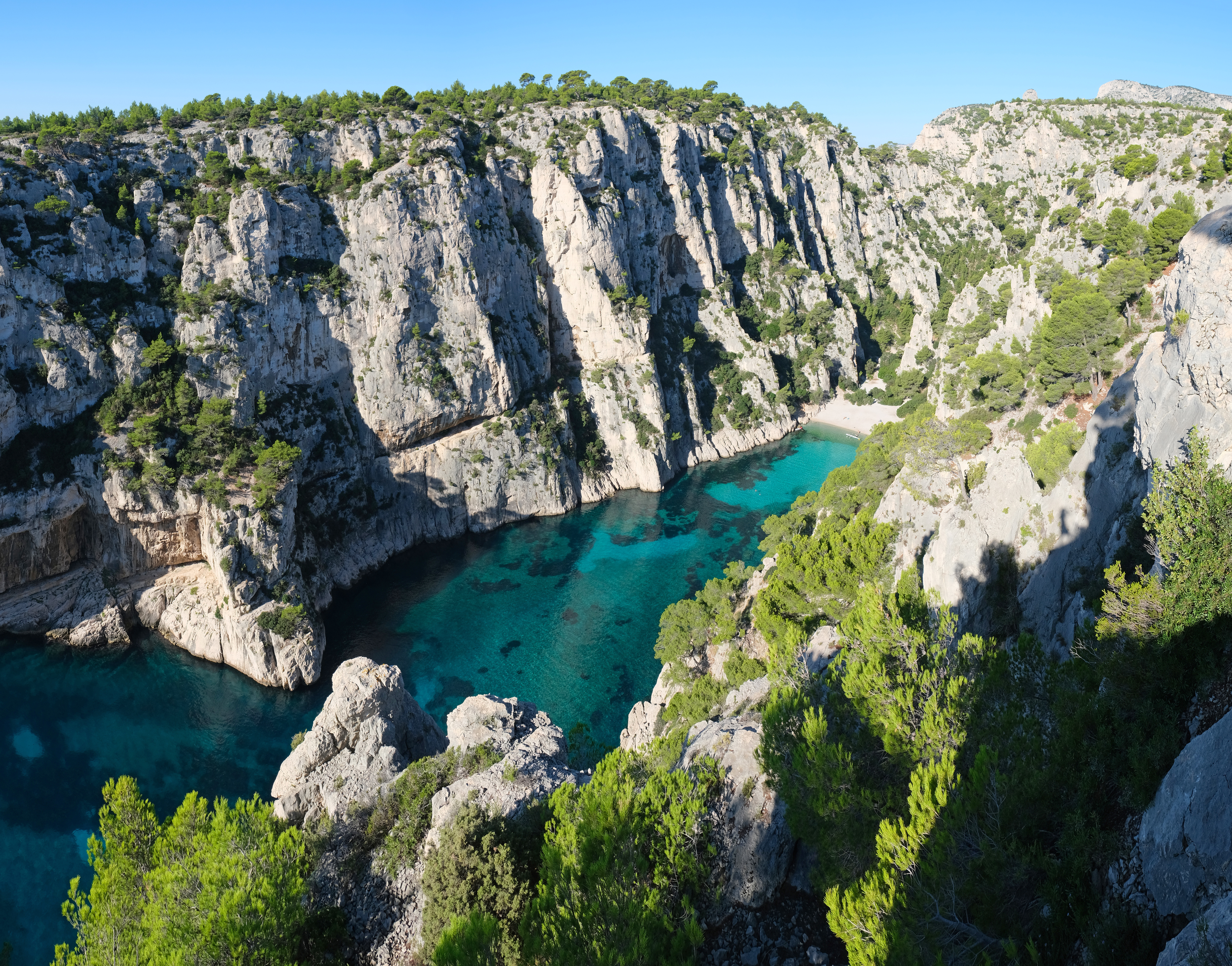
Calanque d'En-Vau, one of the calanques located in the Calanques National Park

Modern day calanques along the Mediterranean Sea are steep-sided valleys that the Holocene (Flandrian) marine transgression partially submerged to form cliff-edged inlets. These valleys were either incised by rivers or created by cave collapse as karstic dry valleys when sea level was lower than at present.

Along the coast of the Mediterranean Sea, some of the valleys, which were flooded to form calanques, might date back to the Messinian salinity crisis between 5.96 and 5.32 million years ago. During this period of time, the Mediterranean Sea became isolated from the Atlantic Ocean and its surface level dropped as much as 1,500 m (4,900 ft) below the level of the Atlantic Ocean. As a result, not only did evaporites accumulate on the abyssal plains of the Mediterranean Sea, but also rivers flowing into it deepened their valleys by hundreds of metres. The Rhône most notably cut a canyon as deep as 576 m (1,890 ft) into Cretaceous carbonate strata near its confluence with its tributary the Ardèche. Fluvial erosion by smaller streams and rivers created numerous other deep, steep-sided valleys in response to the greatly lowered sea level at this time. Also at this time, steep-walled, dry karstic valleys were formed by the collapse of caves that developed in limestone, dolomite, and other carbonate rocks in response to the greatly lowered sea level of the Mediterranean Sea. Later, during the Pleistocene, these valleys were further enlarged and modified by fluvial, karst, and other processes during interglacial drops of sea level within the 100-metre (330 ft) range. During these periods of interglacial low sea level, additional steep-sided valleys, which were later flooded to create calanques, along the Mediterranean coastline were formed by fluvial and karst processes. Today, they can be seen as deep, narrow valleys that are partly submerged by the sea and are made up of limestone or granite.

=== Ecosystem ===
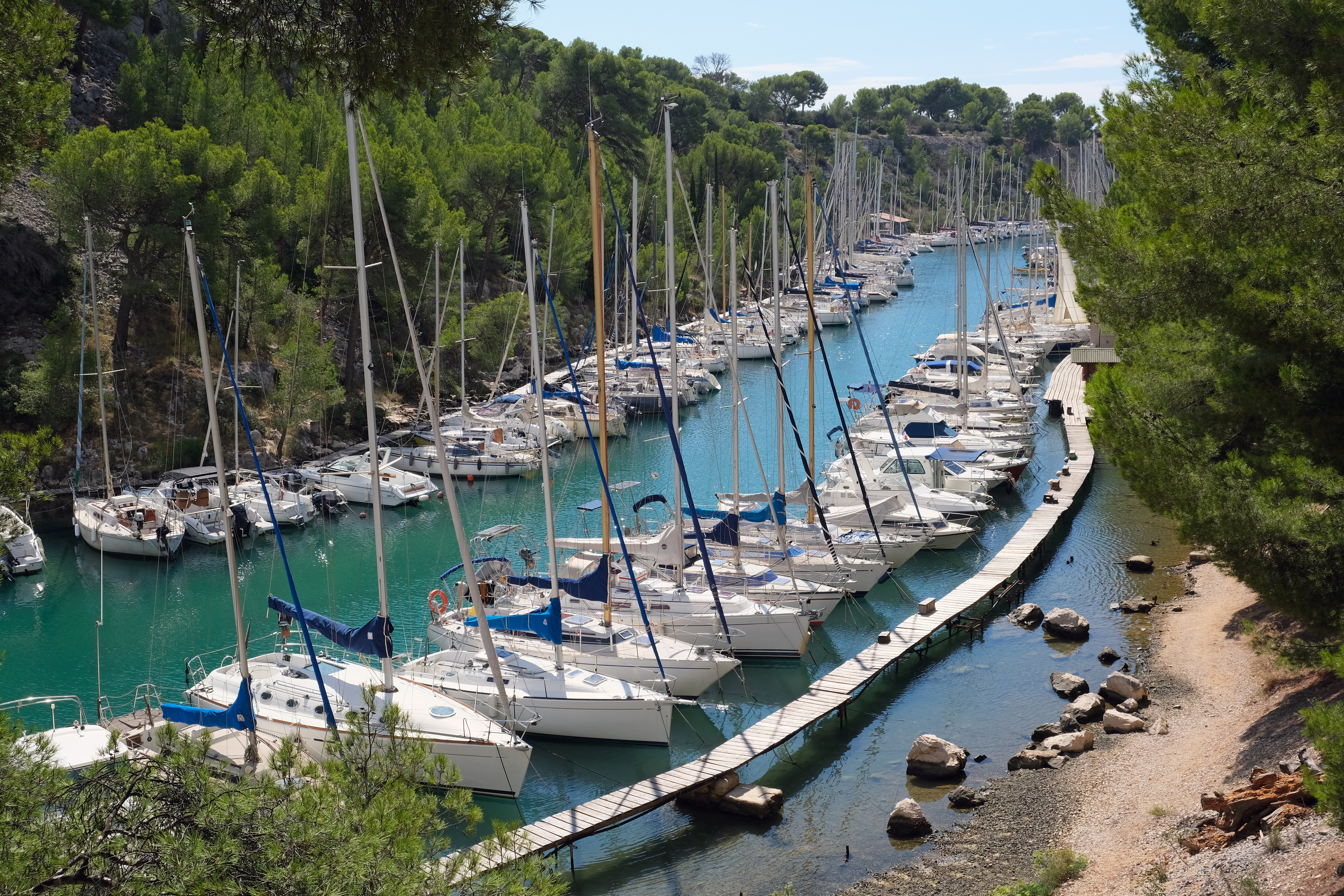
Maquis shrubland along Port-Miou calanque

The calanques have a particular ecosystem, as soil is almost non-existent there, and the limestone cliffs instead contain numerous cracks into which the roots of plants are anchored. Nevertheless, the biota is diverse, with over 900 plant species, including a number of endemics like the Marseille Tragacanth and Sabline de Marseille: members of the Papilionaceae family, which can only be found in the hills of Marseille.

In places where cliffs are less vertical, the vegetation is a classic Mediterranean maquis, typically consisting of densely growing evergreen shrubs such as sage, juniper and myrtle. It is similar to heath in many aspects, but with taller shrubs, typically 2–4 m (6.6–13.1 ft) high as opposed to 0.2–1 m (0.7–3.3 ft) for heath. Like elsewhere on the Mediterranean coast, the Calanques' climate is arid, with moisture during much of the year coming only from the evaporation of the sea. This dry habitat associated with salt spray conditions the subsistence of adapted vegetation. The Calanques shelter rabbits, foxes, large crows and Bonelli's eagles, as well as many reptiles and wild boars.

== Tourism ==
The calanques between Marseille and Cassis are popular amongst tourists and locals alike, offering several vantage points (such as the Corniche des Crêtes and Cap Canaille) allowing spectacular panoramas. A great number of hikers frequent the area, following numerous pre-marked trails. The cliffs are also used as training spots for rock climbers. However, this excessive use has posed problems of potential damage to this delicate microhabitat.

Most of the calanques are also closed to the public during the summer (typically July through September) due to the risks of forest fire that often happen during the dry season. The best time to visit calanques is probably March through May, when temperatures are cool and, unlike autumn and winter, rain is rare. As no fresh water sources are available in the calanques, visitors are advised to carry large supplies of water, especially during the summer heat, to prevent dehydration. Boat tours are also available starting either from Marseille, Cassis or La Ciotat, which can provide for some spectacular sightseeing.

In April 2012, most of the calanques were declared a national park due to their uniqueness.

== Cosquer Cave ==
The Cosquer Cave is an underwater grotto in the Calanque de Morgiou, 37 m (121 ft) underwater, that was once inhabited during the Paleolithic when the sea level was much lower than today. Its walls are covered with paintings and engravings dating back to between 27,000 and 19,000 BC and depict many terrestrial animals such as bison, ibex, and horses as well as sea animals like seals and auks.

== See also ==
- Badlands – Type of heavily eroded terrain
