= The Passion of Vincent van Gogh =

Opera by Christopher Yavelow

- Opera by Christopher Yavelow
- Librettist: Yavelow
- Language: English
- Premiere: 14 April 1984; University of Texas at Dallas

The Passion of Vincent van Gogh is an opera in three acts and eighteen scenes by composer Christopher Yavelow. The opera was commissioned by the National Endowment for the Arts and composed at the Camargo Foundation in 1983 during a Camargo Fellowship in Cassis, France. The English libretto by the composer is taken from the letters of Vincent van Gogh (with permission from the Vincent van Gogh Foundation), Paul Gauguin's journal, and additional official documents relating to Vincent van Gogh. Each line is footnoted in the score and libretto. A German translation by Monique Fasel appears in both the score and libretto. Research for the opera was supported by the International Research and Exchanges Board (IREX) and by the American Council of Learned Societies and the Social Science Research Council. An abridged version of the opera premiered at the University of Texas at Dallas on April 14, 1984.
