= 2003 Broadway musicians strike =

The 2003 Broadway musicians strike was a strike by the Associated Musicians of Greater New York, American Federation of Musicians Local 802 union members, and other Broadway unions such as Actors' Equity Association and International Alliance of Theatrical Stage Employees. The strike lasted from Friday, March 7, 2003, to early Tuesday morning, March 11, 2003.

== Background ==
In negotiations over the Local 802 collective bargaining agreement, the League of American Theatres and Producers proposed to reduce minimum orchestra size requirements from 24–26 to as low as 7 members, with a virtual orchestra filling the gaps. Producers also threatened to replace all musicians with a virtual orchestra if they went on strike. In response, Local 802 developed the "Save Live Broadway" campaign, which garnered media attention and a petition with over 30,000 signatures. However, an agreement between Local 802 and the Producers could not be reached by the deadline, 12:01 AM on March 7, 2003, so the musicians were forced to strike.

== Strike activity ==
325 musicians from Local 802 were joined by 650 actors from the Actors' Equity Association and 350 stagehands from the International Alliance of Theatrical Stage Employees in the strike. The loss of employees from these unions caused all Broadway musicals (except Cabaret, which had a different contract because it was performed at Studio 54) to shut down for the duration of the strike. Those on strike picketed Broadway theatres and staged a mock funeral for live music in Times Square, with many famous Broadway actors in attendance, including Harvey Fierstein.

== Settlement ==
Because of the great strain on New York's economy, with $7 million lost per performance for New York businesses (taxis, restaurants, and hotels), Mayor Michael Bloomberg intervened and invited Bill Moriarity, president of Local 802, and Jed Bernstein, president of the League of American Theaters and Producers, to meet at Gracie Mansion on the night of March 10, 2003 to continue negotiations. Bloomberg also appointed Frank J. Macchiarola, chairman of the Districting Commission, as mediator.

After all-night negotiations, parties agreed to reduce minimum requirements for musicians from 24–26 to 18–19, which would stay in effect for the next 10 years. Mayor Bloomberg announced that the unions had reached a settlement and Broadway was "no longer dark" the morning of March 11, 2003.
