= Cap Canaille =

Highest sea cliff of France, on the Mediterranean southeast of Marseille

Coordinates: 43°11′38″N 5°33′12″E

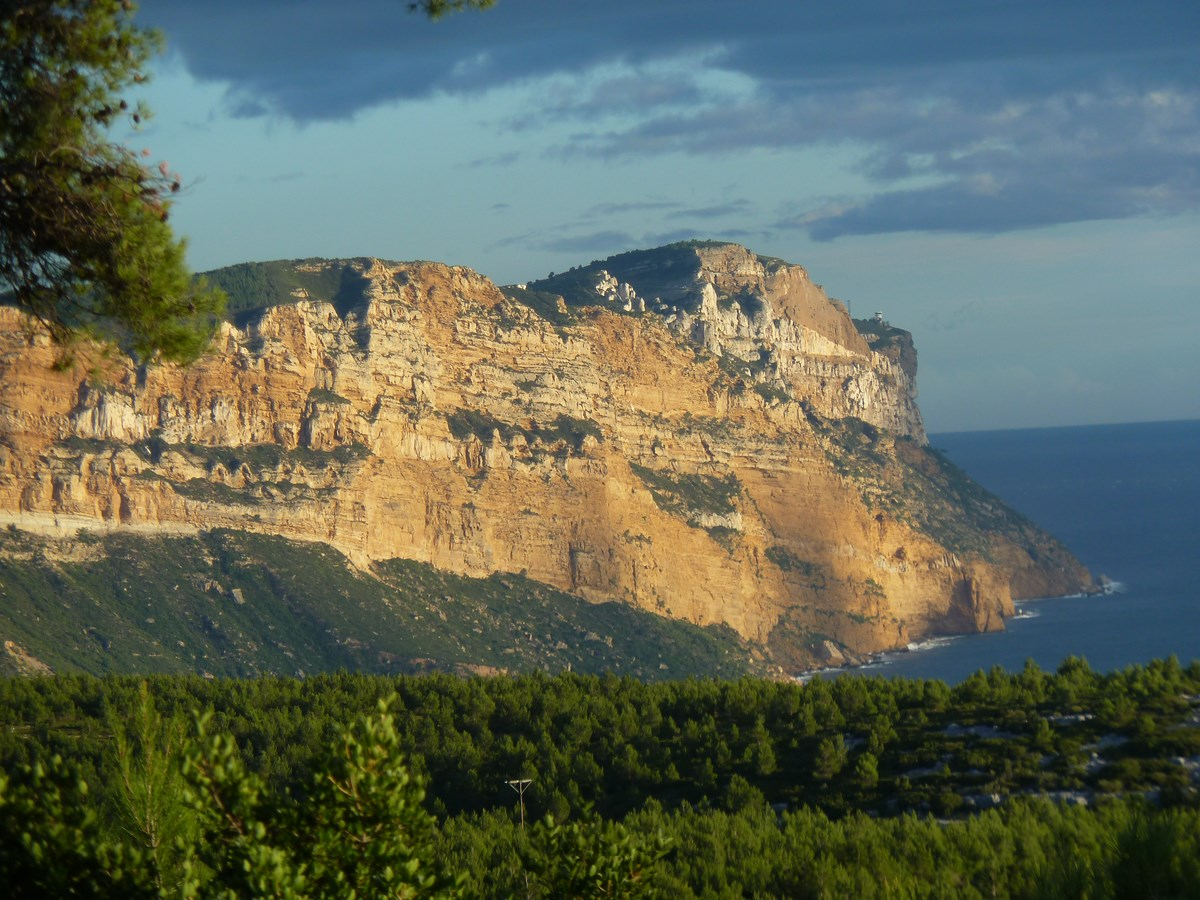
Cap Canaille viewed from the west

Cap Canaille (French pronunciation: [kap kanaj]) is a headland in Calanques National Park in the Bouches-du-Rhône department in Southern France, on the Mediterranean coast between the towns of Cassis and La Ciotat. It is about 27 km (16 mi) southeast of the city centre of Marseille. At 394 m (1,293 ft), it is the highest sea cliff of France.

The rock face of Cap Canaille is called Falaises de Soubeyrannes. The rock consists of layers of ochre-coloured sandstone, conglomerate and limestone from the Turonian age on top of grey marl from the Cenomanian until the Turonian age. The Corniche des Crêtes scenic road runs over the top of the cliff.

The name in Provençal is Cap Naio. It has been misunderstood in French and changed into Cap Canaille instead of "Cap Naille".
