= Virtual orchestra =

Virtual orchestra refers to a variety of different types of technologies and art forms. Most commonly used to refer to orchestral simulations, either for pre-recorded or live environments, it also has been used in other ways, such as IRCAM's virtual orchestra database.

== Overview ==
Due to the development of high capacity samplers, the recording of large instrumental sample libraries, and the capabilities of modern sequencers, simulating traditional orchestra performances has become quite sophisticated. Although the process of developing a particular score requires great skill and sensitivity, and can take a long time, the method is more economical than using a full complement of acoustic musicians. For this reason, much of the music heard on television, and in cinema, uses some form of a virtual orchestra.

The term virtual orchestra is used today to describe the real-time simulation of a traditional acoustic orchestra in live performance genres such as musical theater, ballet, and opera. This use of virtual orchestras emphasizes the interactive capabilities of the technology as opposed to pre-recorded and studio-based genres such as film scores. The term virtual orchestra implies a high degree of human interaction during live performance and suggests that the method simulates both the sound and behavior of an acoustic orchestra. The behavioral characteristics include the ability to follow tempo in real time while making simultaneous adjustments to various expressive parameters including volume, articulation, and phrasing. While the definition has expanded to include creative and research activity in a broader aesthetic range beyond traditional orchestral simulations, the ability to interact with the sonic and behavioral elements in real time via human performance has remained one the requisite attributes of a virtual orchestra.

Its use, particularly in live performances, has been controversial, as many musicians see it as a threat to their vocations. There have been multiple union pickets at performances that used or intended to use this technology, such as the 2003 Broadway musicians strike, that began as a dispute over pit minimums, and rapidly escalated into a referendum on virtual orchestras. Other disputes arose in London's West End, when Sir Cameron Mackintosh moved the long-running production of Les Misérables from the Palace to the Queen's Theatre, necessitating a reduction in orchestra size due to space issues, and several productions by the Opera Company of Brooklyn.

== Virtual orchestra philosophy ==
=== Sonic ===
The philosophical and developmental trajectory of the electronic music art form was set on its course in the 1950s and first articulated by the early European electronic music artists such as Eimert, Stockhausen, Krenek, Koenig, and Boulez. In the words of Herbert Eimert:

(In electronic music) "… there has been no extension of traditional procedure. By the radical nature of its technical apparatus, electronic music is compelled to deal with sound phenomena unknown to musicians of earlier times. The disruption by the electronic means, of the sound world as we have known it leads to new musical possibilities, the ultimate consequences of which can hardly yet be appreciated……here we touch on a most widespread misconception: namely, the idea that one can make music 'traditionally' with electronic means."

The aesthetic foundation of electronic music began to propagate from the post-World War II studios of Europe. An aesthetic propagation that would not be challenged until the introduction of live performance synthesizers (MiniMoogs) in 1970. The trajectory set in motion by the Europeans would split and divide into a myriad of paths, facilitated by transistors, integrated circuits, computers, networks, satellites and the Internet. Yet even into the late 1980s and beyond, the virtual orchestra was criticized for its divergence from the original aesthetic trajectory. The criticism suggested that it was unimaginative to set the Virtual Orchestra's sights on a target of simulation when its potential could be better served by allowing it to function idiomatically while moving the art form forward along the original trajectory of experimentalism. But it was precisely the constraints of, and adherence to this experimentalism that had confined the electronic music art form to the margins of the music industry and prevented its use in the mainstream.

While the experimentalists intended to move the art forward by leaps, and emphasize the aesthetic and technical disconnect between composers, works, studios, and strategies, supporters of the virtual orchestra set out to establish the connection and evolutionary continuity of the technology. This meant propagating the technology on a wide scale which necessitated a high degree of standardization and an eventual common practice. Furthermore, the virtual orchestra pioneers sought to decouple the technology from an aesthetic altogether. This required a sophisticated and standardized technical platform that would exist independently of a specific work of electronic music or from an aesthetic position.

The evolutionary propagation of virtual orchestra technology was not predicated on the experimental European trajectory, but the trajectory set in motion by the traditional acoustic instrument developers hundreds of years earlier. The philosophy of the virtual orchestra rests on the assumption that while the exact simulation of acoustic instruments may be unattainable, some degree of understanding and implementation of the process is crucial to the evolutionary development of the technology. This developmental approach was expressed by Lloyd Watts in regard to computational intelligence and brain function:

"The model must operate at sufficient resolution to be comparable to the real system, so that we build the right intuitions about what information is represented at each stage..... the model development necessarily begins at the boundaries of the system where the real system is well understood, and then can advance into the less-understood regions….In this way, the model can contribute fundamentally to our advancing understanding of the system, rather than simply mirroring the existing understanding."

From this perspective, it was inevitable, if not deterministic, that the early years of the virtual orchestra's development would explore the methodical simulation of acoustic instruments.

=== Live performance instruments ===
Virtual orchestras are technologically capable of simulating the sound and behavior of a traditional acoustic orchestra. That includes the ability to follow a conductor's tempo and to respond to a variety of expressive musical nuances in real time. Critics of the technology do not believe that a virtual orchestra qualifies as musical instrumentation because its output is far too complex to be under the control of a single performer. In order to achieve the increased gains in productivity, the system is viewed as relying on automation. More specifically, the one-to-one relationship between the input and output that has historically defined traditional musical instruments appears to have been circumvented.

Resistance to the acceptance of electronic devices as musical instruments can be traced back to the 1930s. The Russian music critic, Boris de Schloezer, in reaction to the Theremin, was one of the first to articulate this argument and to discuss the imbalance between an acoustic and an electronic instrument. The traditional acoustic instrument, he stated, bears a "direct, physical relationship between the player and the sound-producing device". Furthermore, he suggested that an instrument "is in intimate contact with the human body and respond(s) to its slightest impulses". Moreover, de Schloezer's most direct statement in opposition to electronic instruments proclaimed that "the mechanization of music actually means the increase in the number of intermediaries between the producer of music and the listener". However, Leon Theremin disagreed and saw "the electrical apparatus tapping more directly into the performer's thoughts and intentions". The noted Russian composer and theorist, Joseph Schillinger, understood the proliferation of electricity to be "the most important evolutionary step in the entire span of history". Schillinger's ideas about the subject are clearly articulated in his famous article from 1931 entitled: "Electricity, a Musical Liberator."

The virtual orchestra, while preserving much of the traditional tactile instrumental interface, requires a redefinition of the term musical instrument. The amount of concurrent decision-making and simultaneous physical activity required to play an instrument with these extended capabilities exceeds human abilities. Thus, the notion of interfacing with the instrument exclusively through physical gesture would be impossible.

== History ==
The first use of a virtual orchestra in a live performance occurred on February 12, 1987. Christopher Yavelow's opera, Countdown, was performed by the Boston Lyric Opera Company under the direction of John Balme. The downbeats of Balme's baton were synchronized through a modified Roland SBX80 to the sequencer driving a fully loaded Kurzweil K250 that had been enhanced with some extra proprietary orchestral sounds. The K250 sampler, a virtual orchestra in a box, was hidden behind the curtain. The commission was sponsored by "Opera in the Eighties and Beyond" through Opera America in conjunction with The National Endowment for the Arts. The event was covered by Macworld, Opera News, Personal Publishing, Kurzweil Generation, and the Journal of the Audio Engineering Society, and received additional publicity through the popular TV show NOVA on which Yavelow demonstrated the "orchestra in a box" with its inventor Ray Kurzweil fielding questions. The following year, Countdown won first prize in the Virginia Opera Society's "New One-Act Operas" competition. The society mounted a full production of the opera in 1988, again, to the accompaniment of Yavelow's virtual orchestra. On December 1, 1994, the Boston Lyric Opera's recording of Countdown became the first opera in cyberspace, generating a week of coverage on MSNBC in early 1995. Prevailing technology required segmenting the opera into 16 ".au" files, with the libretto and notes divided accordingly. In 2004, to commemorate of the tenth anniversary of the first internet opera, the composer replaced the original files with a single streaming mp3 of higher quality. Otherwise, the site has remained unchanged since its launch, a monument to the first use of virtual orchestra technology in live performance.

The first use of virtual orchestra technology to simulate a previously written classical piece in a live performance occurred in March 1989. Frederick Bianchi and David B Smith, director and associate director of the Electronic Music Studios at the College-Conservatory of Music (C.C.M.), University of Cincinnati, collaborated with director John Eaton in a made-for-television production of Iphegenie auf Tauride, an opera by Gluck. The intention was to create an electronic score for the movie. Recording and programming sessions were begun to input and orchestrate the score using the facilities in the Conservatory's Electronic Music Studio. Unbeknownst to Bianchi and Smith, there was also scheduled two workshop performances in front of a live audience. Frantically working to find a solution to this, an ad hoc implementation involving computer sequencers, sound modules, and a small sound reinforcement system were used. Although crude, the results convinced the pair that the development of live performance systems was a practical possibility.

Excited by the implications of this experiment, the pair continued to develop this technology, and looked for additional implementations. In the following year, they developed a system for a production of The Wizard of Oz at Cincinnati Playhouse in the Park, under the direction of Worth Gardner. As the technology was developed, additional performance opportunities presented themselves. Their 1995 production of Hansel and Gretel with the Kentucky Opera generated significant publicity, utilizing a multi-speaker immersive field along with interactive performance controls.

Continuing to develop their work, Bianchi (now at Worcester Polytechnic Institute) and Smith (at NYC College of Technology, City University of New York), collaborated with Lucent Technologies in a demonstration of gestural control capture technologies. Working with Phil Ramone, they created a virtual orchestra for Telecom '99 in Geneva Switzerland using an immersive environment of 310 speakers.

== See also ==
- List of music software
