= Christopher Yavelow =

American classical composer

Christopher Yavelow (born 14 June 1950, Cambridge, Massachusetts), the son of a film professor and visual artist, is a composer and proponent of computer assisted composition.

He studied composition and theory at Boston University (BM 1972, MM 1974), Harvard University (MFA 1977), the Franz Liszt Academy in Hungary (1977–78), the Darmstadt Ferienkurse in Germany, the Conservatoire Darius Milhaud in Aix-en-Provence, and L'ecole Normale de Musique in Paris where he also studied with Nadia Boulanger (1978–1979).

Yavelow has taught music composition and theory at Harvard (teaching fellow, 1975–77), the Paris-American Academy (1978–79), the University of Texas (at Dallas, 1983–84), and Claremont Graduate University (1988-93). He was Chairman of the Department of Music at Schiller International University from 1979 to 1980. Currently, he teaches at the University of Maryland University College (from 2008).

Major works include his grand opera, The Passion of Vincent van Gogh commissioned by the National Endowment for the Arts in 1981 and performed by the University of Texas in 1984. The National Institute of Music Theater sponsored his chamber opera, Countdown (1987), as part of their “Opera in the Eighties and Beyond” program on behalf of the Boston Lyric Opera. Countdown is the first computer-assisted opera, the first opera performance accompanied by a virtual orchestra (February 12, 1987, by the Boston Lyric Opera), and the first opera in cyberspace (1994).

Throughout the 1980s, Yavelow published many articles on computer music for Byte Magazine, Computer Music Journal, Electronic Musician, Macromedia Journal, Macworld, and New Media Magazine. His Macworld Music and Sound Bible was IDG's first "Bible" book (1992), and also won the Computer Press Association Award (1992). The book and its Japanese translation were well received by music educators and the entertainment industry. Yavelow went on to author or co-author nearly a dozen books, mainly on music and multimedia. From 1995 through 1999, he was the editor of A-R Editions' Computer Music and Digital Audio book series.

== Selected publications ==
- Christopher Yavelow, "Personal Computers and Music: The State of the Art", Journal of the Audio Engineering Society, Volume 35, Issue 3, March 1987, pp. 160–193.
- Christopher Yavelow, "Music and Microprocessors: MIDI and the State of the Art" in Curtis Roads (ed.), The Music Machine: Selected Readings from Computer Music Journal, MIT Press, 1989. ISBN 0-262-68078-5.
- Christopher Yavelow, Macworld Music and Sound Bible, IDG Books, 1992. ISBN 1-878058-18-5.
