= Calanque de Morgiou =

Inlet in France

Coordinates: 43°12′32″N 5°26′57″E

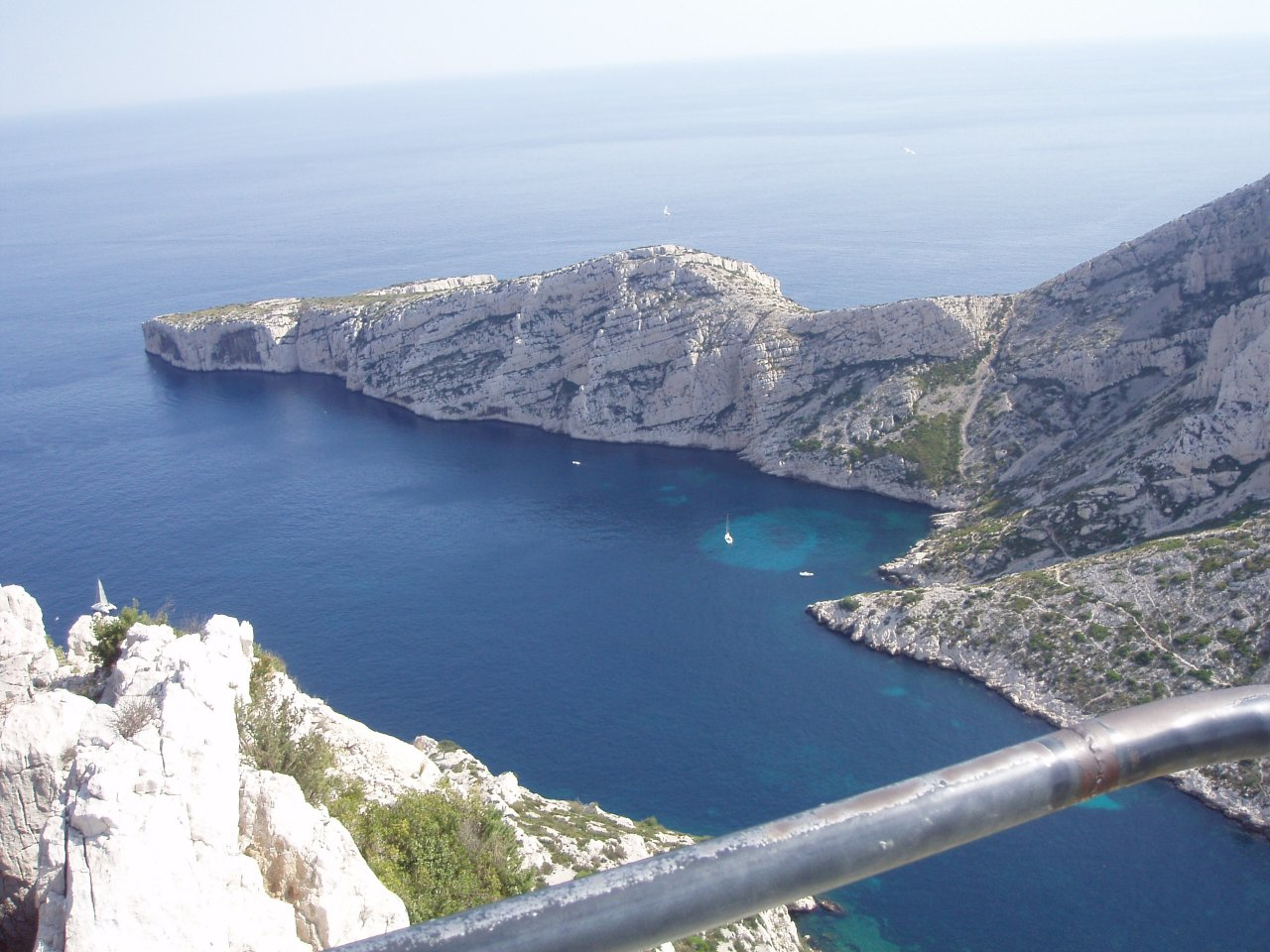
A view of the Calanque de Morgiou

The Calanque de Morgiou is one of the biggest calanques located between Marseille and Cassis.

Formerly a fishing port, it is famous for the gigantic tuna fishing organized there in 1622, when the king Louis XIII paid a visit to Marseille. It still houses small fishing cabins, but they're now used for tourism rather than fishing.

The Calanque de Morgiou is also famous for the Cosquer cave, an underwater grotto containing numerous cave drawings dating back as far as 27,000 years BP.
