= Calanque de Sormiou =

Calanque in Southern France

Coordinates: 43°12′28″N 5°25′36″E

The Calanque de Sormiou (French pronunciation: [kalɑ̃k də sɔʁmju]; Occitan: Calanca de Sormiou) is the largest calanque in Calanques National Park in Southern France. Located within the City of Marseille's 9th arrondissement, it is famous for its climbing spots. Access by car is restricted in the summer due to the risk of forest fires.

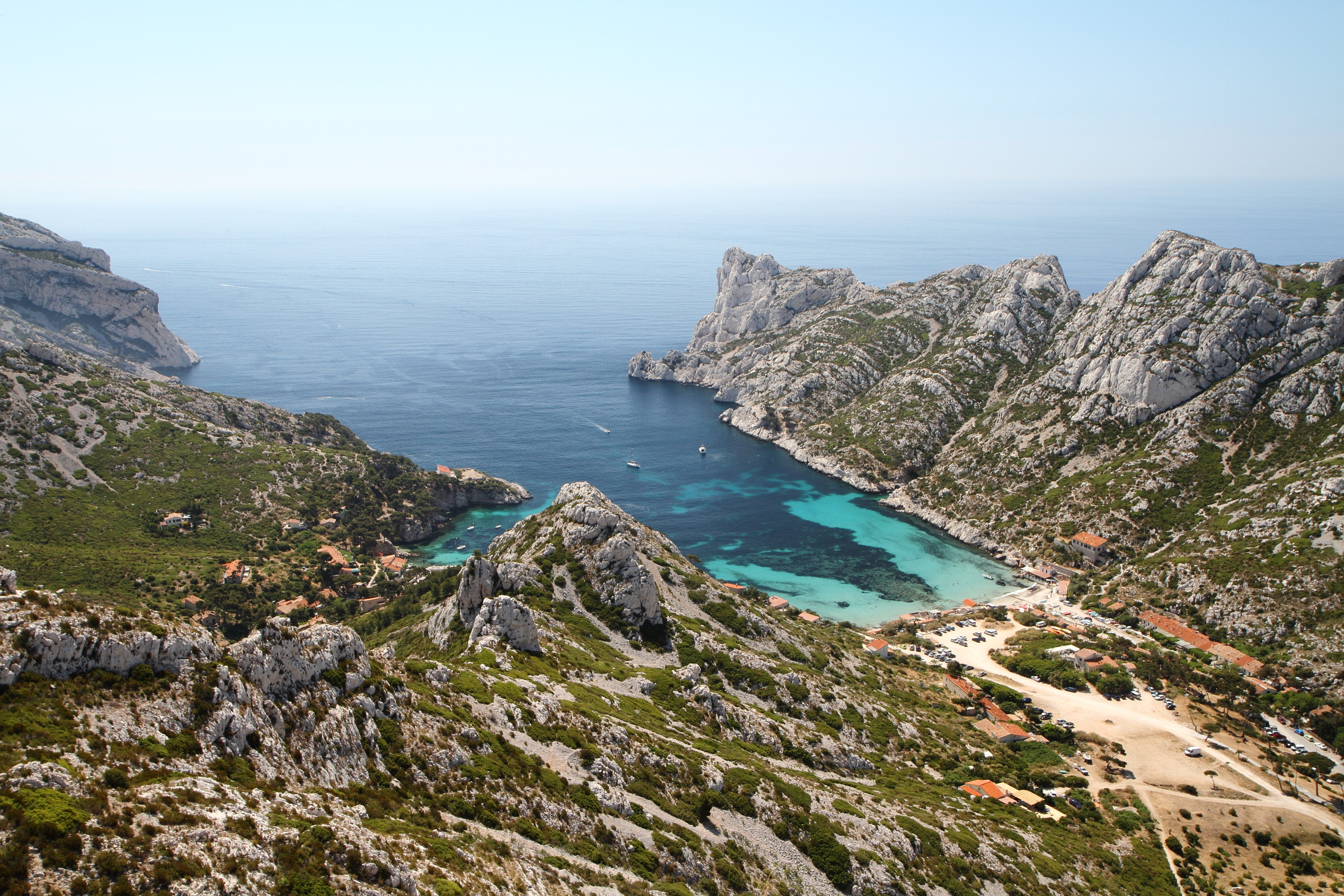
Calanque de Sormiou

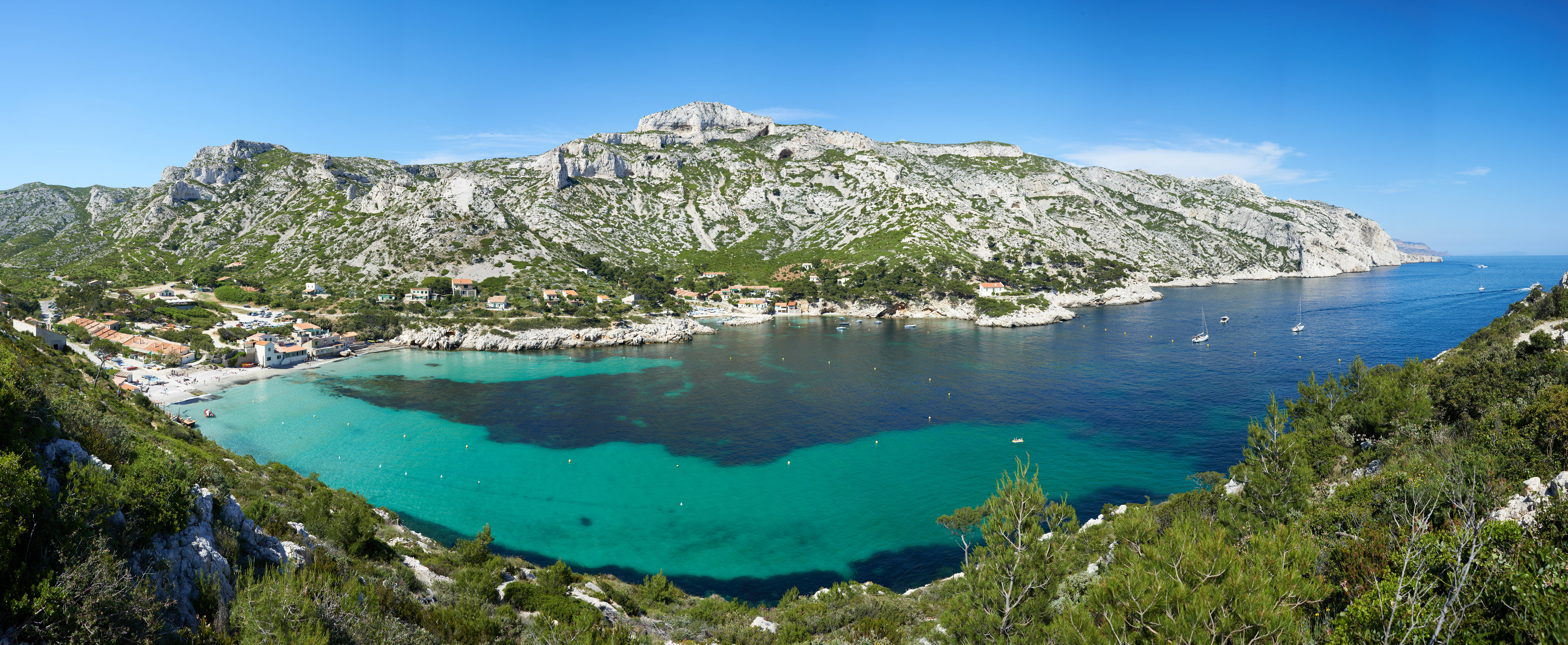
Sormiou seen from the western side

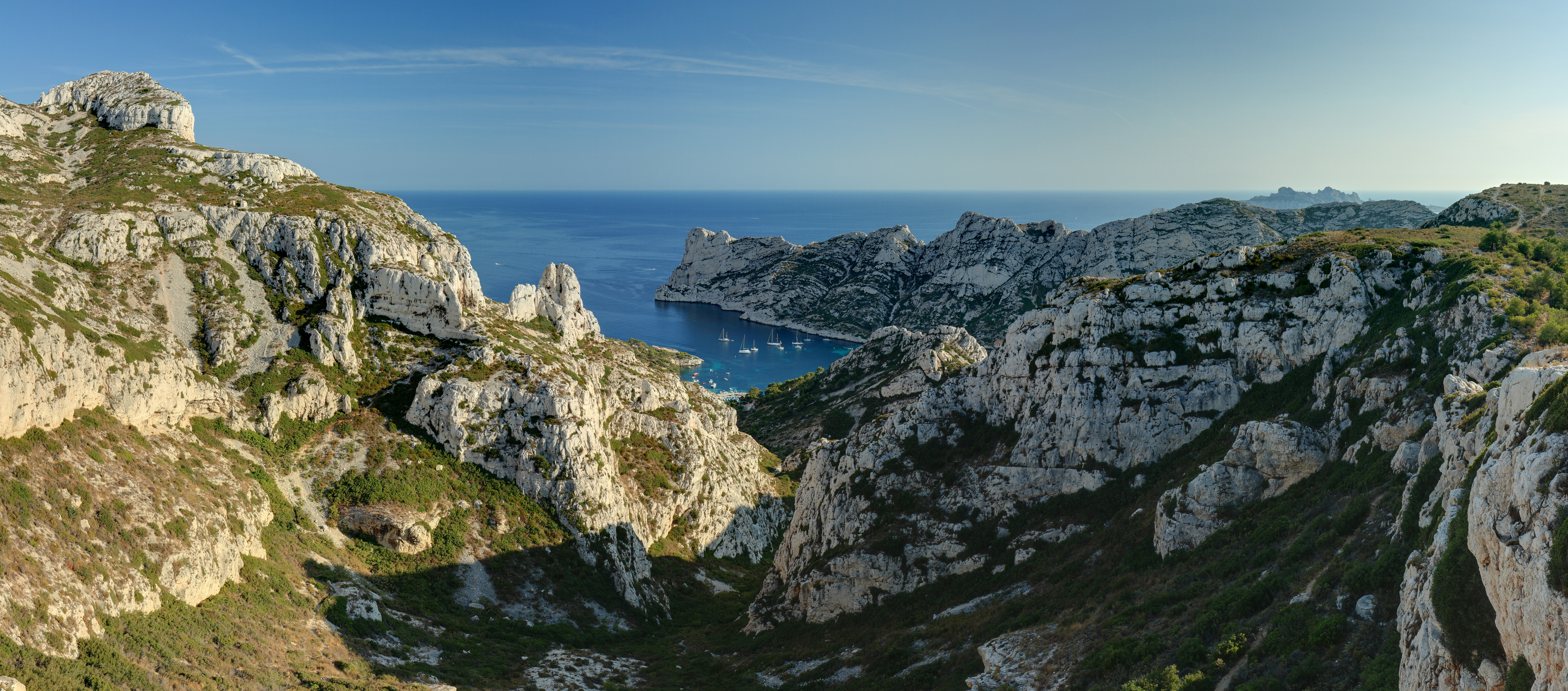
The Calanque seen from the surrounding hills, 2008
