= Mont Puget =

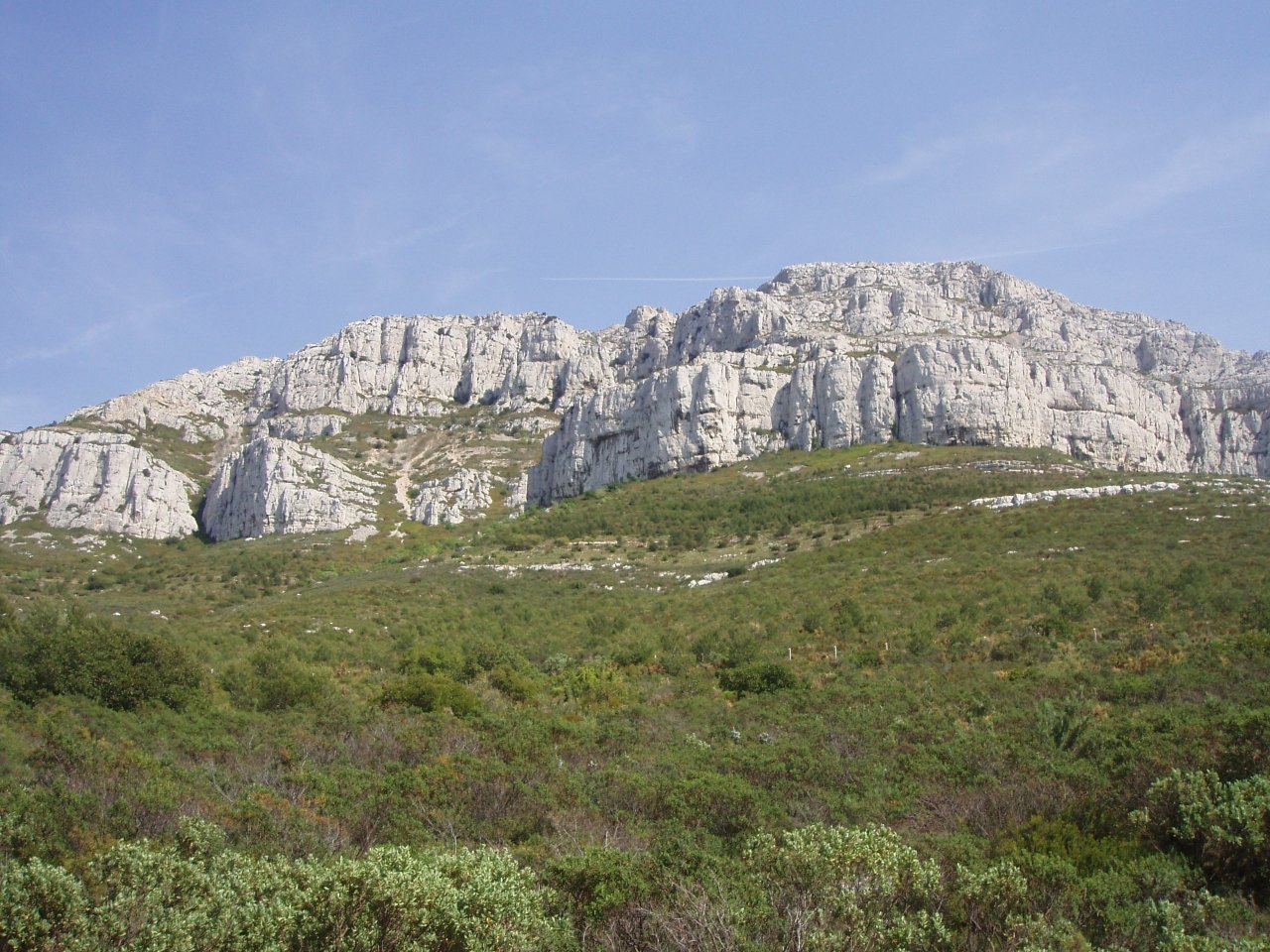
- Mont Puget from the Luminy University campus

Highest point
- Elevation: 563 m (1,847 ft)
- Coordinates: 43°13′19″N 05°27′31″E

Geography
- Location within France
- Location: Bouches-du-Rhône, France
- Parent range: Calanques de Marseille

Geology
- Mountain type: Limestone

Mont Puget is a mountain, part of Marseille-Cassis calanques, located south-east of Marseille. Like most Marseille mountains, it is formed from limestone.

== Tourism ==
One of Mont Puget "stone rivers"

Often overlooked in favor of the coastline and Calanques, Mont Puget features notable trails and routes for hiking and climbing.

An accessible trail leads to the summit of Mont Puget. Like other mountain ranges in the Marseille region, the trail is designed to double as access route for emergency vehicles and firefighter services during a wildfire.

The top of the mountain is covered with eroded limestone that sticks out in numerous needle-like spikes.

== Crest of Luminy University ==
A stylized representation of Mont Puget is displayed on the crest of Luminy Faculty of Sciences, part of the University of the Mediterranean Aix-Marseille II. The Luminy campus is located 1 km northwest of Mont Puget.

== Name ==
An urban legend insist that the mountain is named after the sculptor Pierre Puget which is a curious misconception since the mountain's name predates the sculptor on maps by several millennia. The name Puget is a diminutive from the Provençal word "puech" that originates from the Latin "podium", hence an elevated place that designates a certain eminence.
