= Cosquer Cave =

Cave and archaeological site in Marseille, France

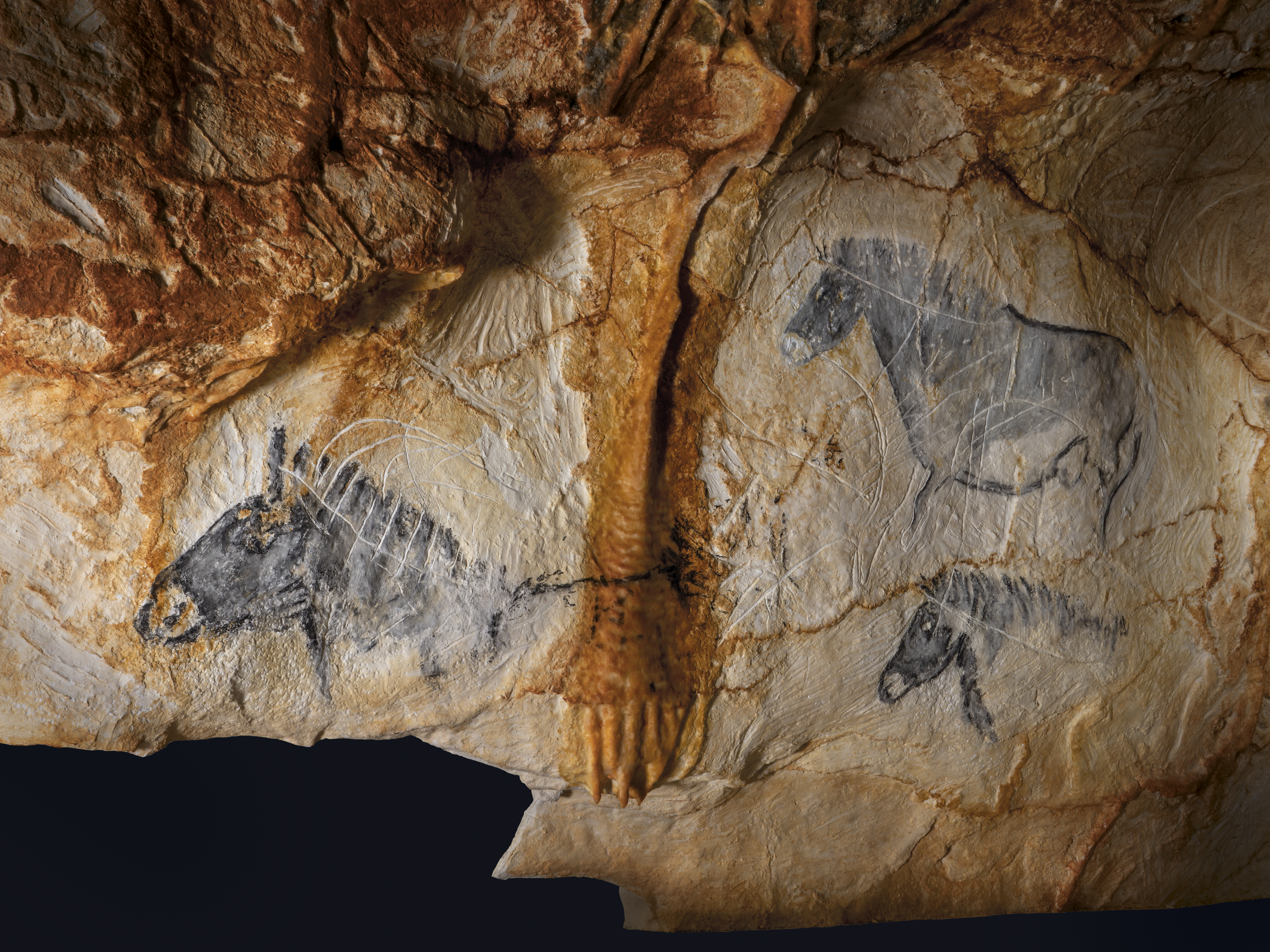
- Replica of the horse panel in Cosquer Cave

- Location in Provence-Alpes-Cote d'Azur, France Cosquer Cave (France)
- 43°12′10″N 5°26′57″E
- Type: Cave paintings
- Location: Marseille, Provence-Alpes-Cote d'Azur, France

History
- Built: c. 27,000 years ago
- Abandoned: c. 19,000 years ago

Site notes
- Discovered: 9 July 1991 by Yann Gogan, Pascale Oriol, Cendrine and Henri Cosquer

Cross section with entrance tunnel and current sea level

Cosquer Cave ([kɔskɛʁ]) is located in the Calanque de Morgiou in Marseille, France, near Cap Morgiou. The entrance to the cave is located 37 m (121 ft) underwater, due to the Holocene sea level rise, and the cave contains various prehistoric rock art engravings. Its submarine entrance was discovered in 1985 by Henri Cosquer, a professional diver. The underwater passage leading to the cave was progressively explored until 1990 by cave divers, without the divers being aware of the archaeological character of the cave.

Only in the last period (1990-91) of the progressive underwater explorations did the cave divers emerge in the non-submerged part of the cave. The prehistoric paintings were not immediately discovered by the divers to first emerge from the other side of the sump. The cave was named after Henri Cosquer when its existence was made public in 1991, after three divers became lost in the cave and died.

== Description ==
The cave can now be accessed by divers through a 175 m (574 ft) long tunnel; the entrance is located 37 m (121 ft) below sea level, which has risen since the cave was inhabited. During the glacial periods of the Pleistocene, the shore of the Mediterranean was several kilometers to the south and the sea level up to 100 m (330 ft) below the entrance of the cave.

== Discovery and history ==
Henri Cosquer, a professional diver from Cassis, discovered the submerged entrance to a cave in 1985, guided by a tip from a fellow diver. That year, he began exploring the underwater passage alone and later with a friend and diving instructor from his club. The passage narrowed and turned sharply before leading to an underground lake. On one solo dive, a malfunctioning lamp forced Cosquer to retreat, leaving him shaken.

In June 1990, Cosquer enlisted Belgian cave divers Bernard and Marc Van Espen, who located the entrance 37 meters below the Pointe de la Voile near Cap Morgiou. They followed the gallery carefully to avoid disturbing silt and reached the underground lake Cosquer had seen, but their guide line ran out, forcing them to turn back. At this point, the dry section of the cave remained unexplored.

In June 1991, Marc Van Espen returned and, on June 24, installed the final section of the guide line during a dive with Cosquer. Their exploration lasted only 30 minutes, providing a brief view of the first chamber beyond the submerged passage.

On July 9, 1991, Cosquer explored the cave further with his niece, Cendrine Cosquer, and diving club members Yann Gogan and Pascale Oriol. They examined the dry section in more detail and discovered what appeared to be a handprint on the wall, suggesting prehistoric art. This finding spurred several dives in July and August, leading to the discovery of additional cave paintings and the production of photographs and films with the help of Thierry Pelissier and Gilles Sourice.

Tragedy struck on September 1, 1991, when three divers from Grenoble became lost in the access gallery and perished. Cosquer and Gogan helped recover their bodies. Two days later, on 3 September 1991, Cosquer declared the cave to the Maritime Affairs Department in Marseille.

The discovery was referred to the Regional Archaeological Service under the Ministry of Culture. From September 18-20, 1991, an expedition led by prehistorian Jean Courtin and cave art specialist Jean Clottes took place aboard the DRASM (Department of Underwater and Submarine Archaeological Research) vessel Archéonaute. Initial skepticism about the authenticity of the artwork arose but was later addressed.

In March 1992, a second entrance was discovered, which would remain secret for over thirty years for security reasons.

In June 1992, another mission resulted in the production of a film, The Secret of Cosquer Cave. Between 2001 and 2005, and again from 2010 to 2015, a series of archaeological research operations led by Luc Vanrell, with contributions from Michel Olive, further studied the cave.

A legal dispute emerged between Cosquer and the Ministry of Culture regarding compensation under a 2001 law on preventive archaeology. This law entitles discoverers to financial rewards based on the site's archaeological value. Cosquer sought a reward and a share of profits from book sales featuring cave photographs. Henri Cosquer also claimed a reward and the recovery of part of the proceeds from the sale of books of photographs of the cave.

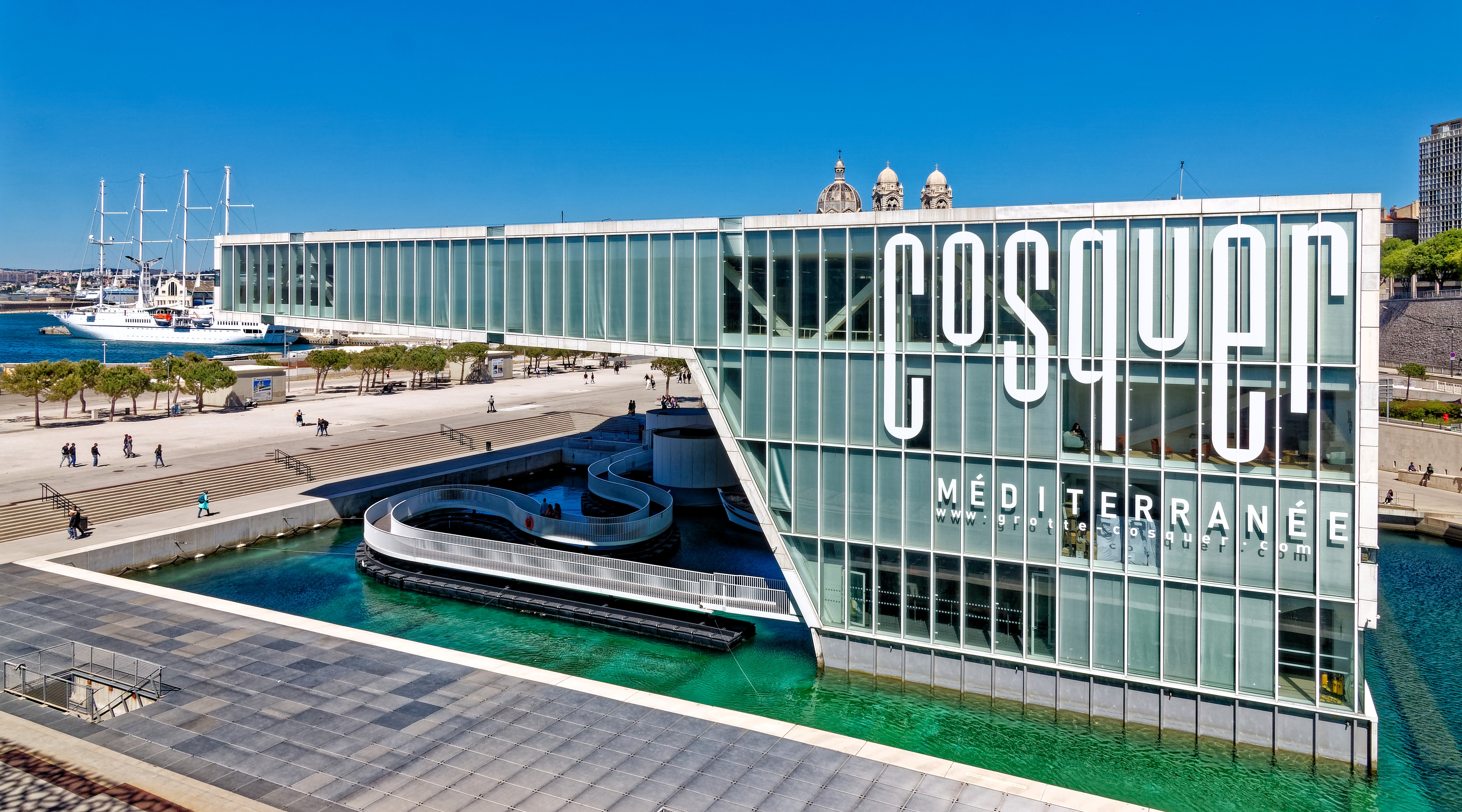
The building housing the replica and associated exhibitions

In 2022, a replica at Cosquer Méditerranée was inaugurated in the Villa Méditerranée (a 2013 work of the architect Stefano Boeri) in the port of Marseille.

== Prehistoric paintings ==
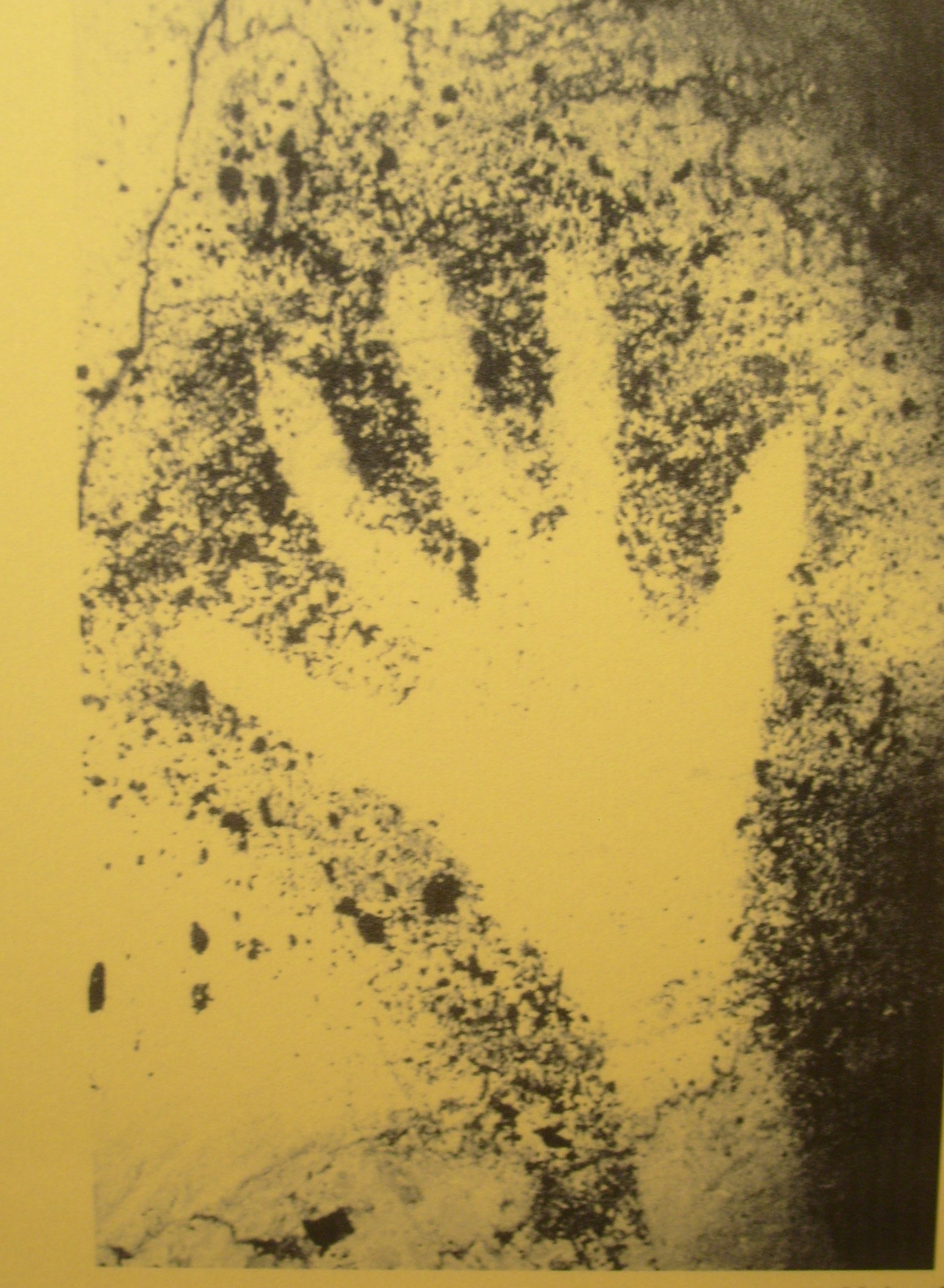
Stencil of human hand, Cosquer Cave, around 27,000 years ago.

Four-fifths of the cave were permanently or periodically submerged by sea water destroying any cave wall art in those locations. Nearly 500 instances of cave art remain which date back to two distinct periods during the Upper Paleolithic. The first phase, from around 27,000 years ago (the Gravettian Era), is represented by art consisting of 65 hand stencils, 44 in black and 21 in red. Art from the more recent period dates to around 19,000 years ago (the Solutrean Era) and features much more complex depictions of various animals and human figures. In total there are 177 animals drawings found in the cave; these include 63 horses, 28 ibex, 17 deer, 10 bison, and 7 aurochs. There is also the more unusual depiction of 16 marine animals including 9 seals and 3 great auks as well as some jellyfish and various figures which could be either fish or cetaceans. Of the human figures there are numerous sexual symbols but also one example of "the killed man" motif which can be seen in other caves such as at Lascaux.

== See also ==
- List of Stone Age art
- Great auk (in cave art)
