= Calanque de Sugiton =

Inlet in France

Coordinates: 43°12′38″N 5°27′20″E

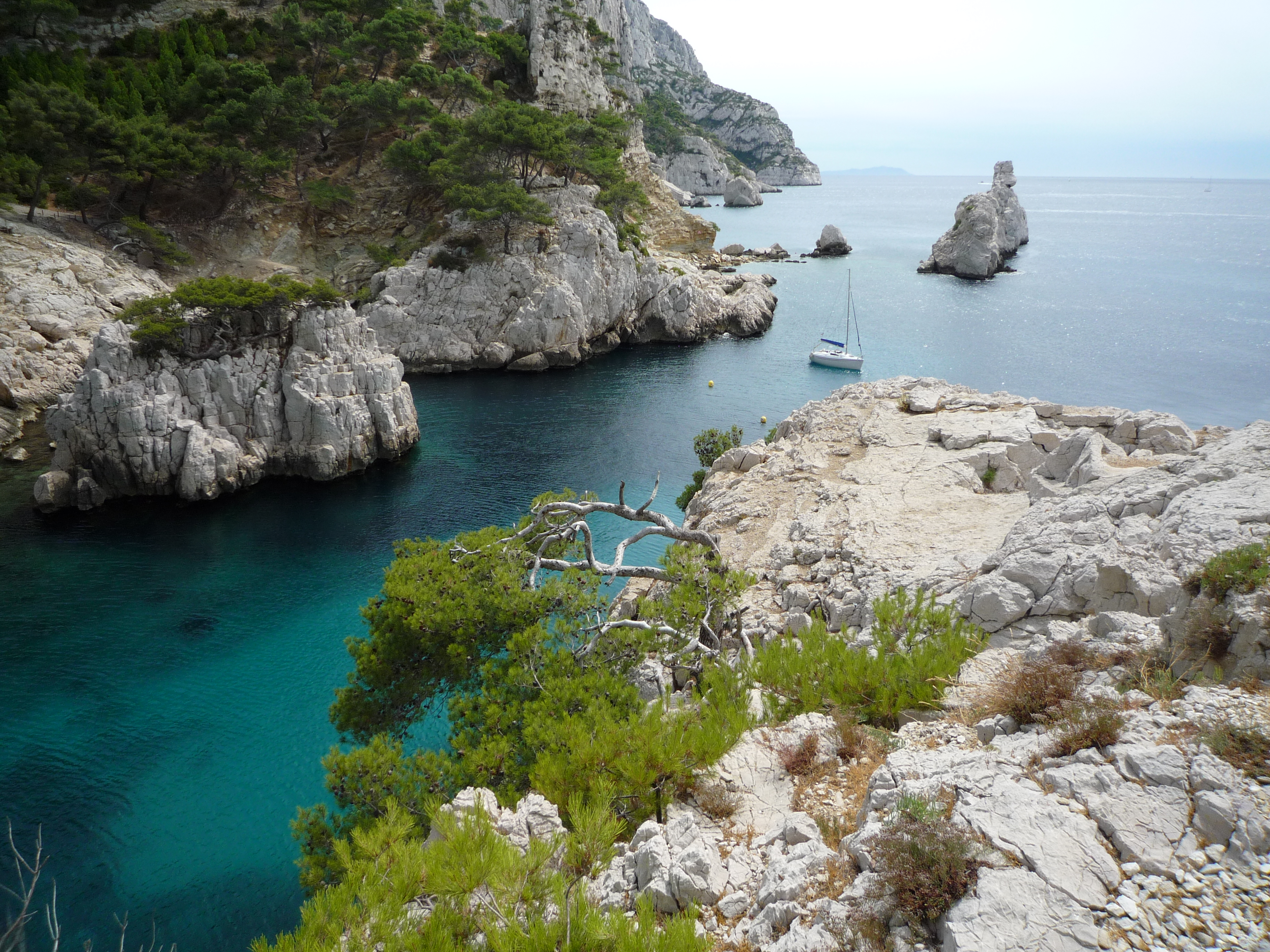
Calanque de Sugiton

The Calanque de Sugiton is one of the numerous Calanques located between Marseille and Cassis, France.

While quite small, Sugiton is perhaps the most known of all Marseille Calanques, simply because it can be easily accessed by hikers, starting from Luminy University Campus, and because it is open to tourists even during high summer, unlike most Calanques (which are usually closed because of high fire risk).

A small beach can be found at the extremity of the calanque.
