= Calanque de Port-Miou =

Calanque in Cassis, France

Coordinates: 43°12′20″N 5°30′55″E

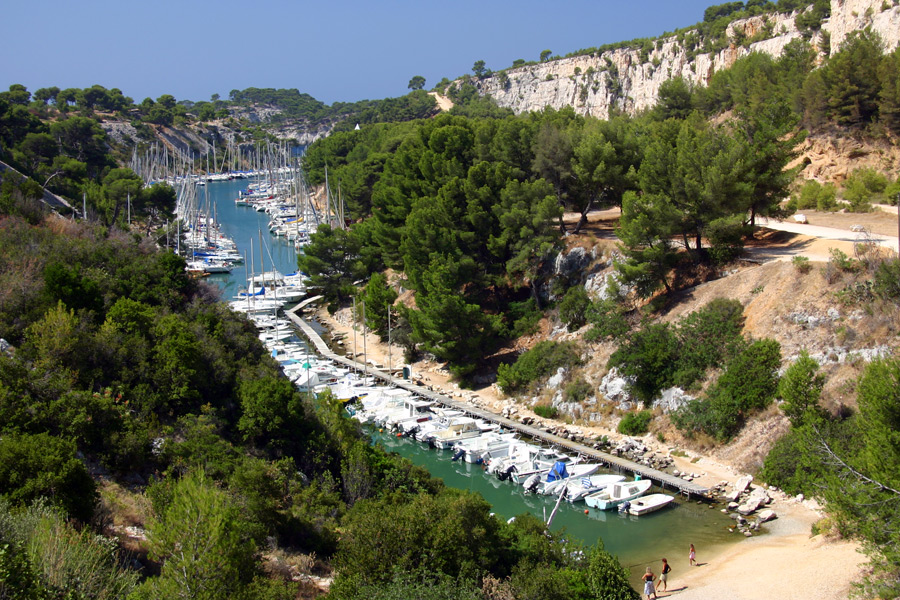
Calanque de Port-Miou

The Calanque de Port-Miou is one of the three big calanques of Cassis in the French Riviera. It is long and narrow, and thus was suitable for establishing a marina.

The name Port-Miou is an approximate transcription in French orthography of the Occitan Pòrt-Melhor (the "best port") which is locally pronuncied /pwɔʁ.mi.ju/.

== History ==
Port-Miou was for a long time a seigniory in its own right, dependent on the House of Baux. On April 4, 1402, in Brantes, at the foot of Mont Ventoux, in the presence of his wife Alix des Baux, Odon de Villars donated to his nephew Philippe de Lévis the fiefs of Brantes, Plaisians and their dependencies, the seigneuries of Saint-Marcel, Roquefort, Le Castellet, Cassis, and Port-Miou, dependent on the barony of Aubagne, as well as La Fare-les-Oliviers, and Éguilles. His nephew, in return, was to serve as a surety vis-à-vis Raymond de Turenne in the observation of an agreement made between the viscount, him and his wife Alix. In the event of non-compliance on the part of Alix and Odon, the latter would have to pay 50,000 florins to Raymond de Turenne.
