= Cassis =

Administrative division in Provence-Alpes-Côte d'Azur, France

Cassis Cassís (Occitan)
- Commune
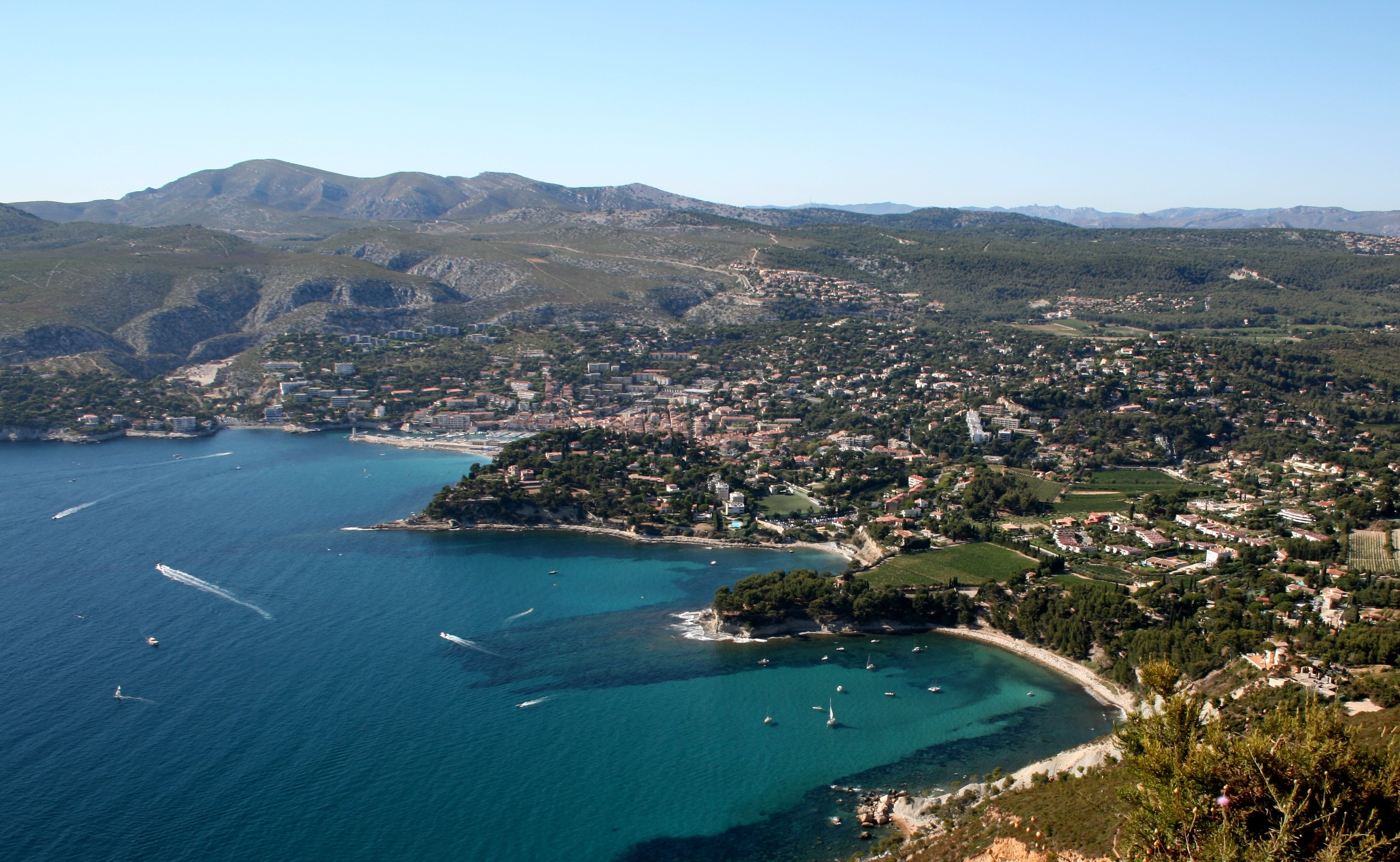
- Cassis seen from the cliffs of Cap Canaille

- Coat of arms
- Location of Cassis
- Location within France Location within Provence-Alpes-Côte d'Azur
- Coordinates: 43°13′00″N 5°32′20″E
- Country: France
- Region: Provence-Alpes-Côte d'Azur
- Department: Bouches-du-Rhône
- Arrondissement: Marseille
- Canton: La Ciotat
- Intercommunality: Aix-Marseille-Provence

Government
  - Mayor (2026–32): Danielle Milon
- Area^{1}: 26.86 km^{2} (10.37 sq mi)
- Highest elevation: 416 m (1,365 ft)
- Lowest elevation: 0 m (0 ft)
- Population (2023): 6,661
  - Density: 248.0/km^{2} (642.3/sq mi)
- Time zone: UTC+01:00 (CET)
  - Summer (DST): UTC+02:00 (CEST)
- INSEE/Postal code: 13022 /13260
- ^{1} French Land Register data, which excludes lakes, ponds, glaciers > 1 km^{2} (0.386 sq mi or 247 acres) and river estuaries.

Cassis (French pronunciation: [kasi]; Provençal: Cassís) is a commune situated east of Marseille in the department of Bouches-du-Rhône in the Provence-Alpes-Côte d'Azur region, whose coastline is known in English as the French Riviera, in Southern France.

It is a popular tourist destination, famous for its cliffs (falaises) and the sheltered inlets called calanques. The wines of Cassis are white and rosé, and not to be confused with crème de cassis, a specialty of Burgundy which takes its name from blackcurrants (cassis), not the commune. It is a filming location featured in The French Connection, notably for heroin smuggler Alain Charnier's house.

== Geography ==
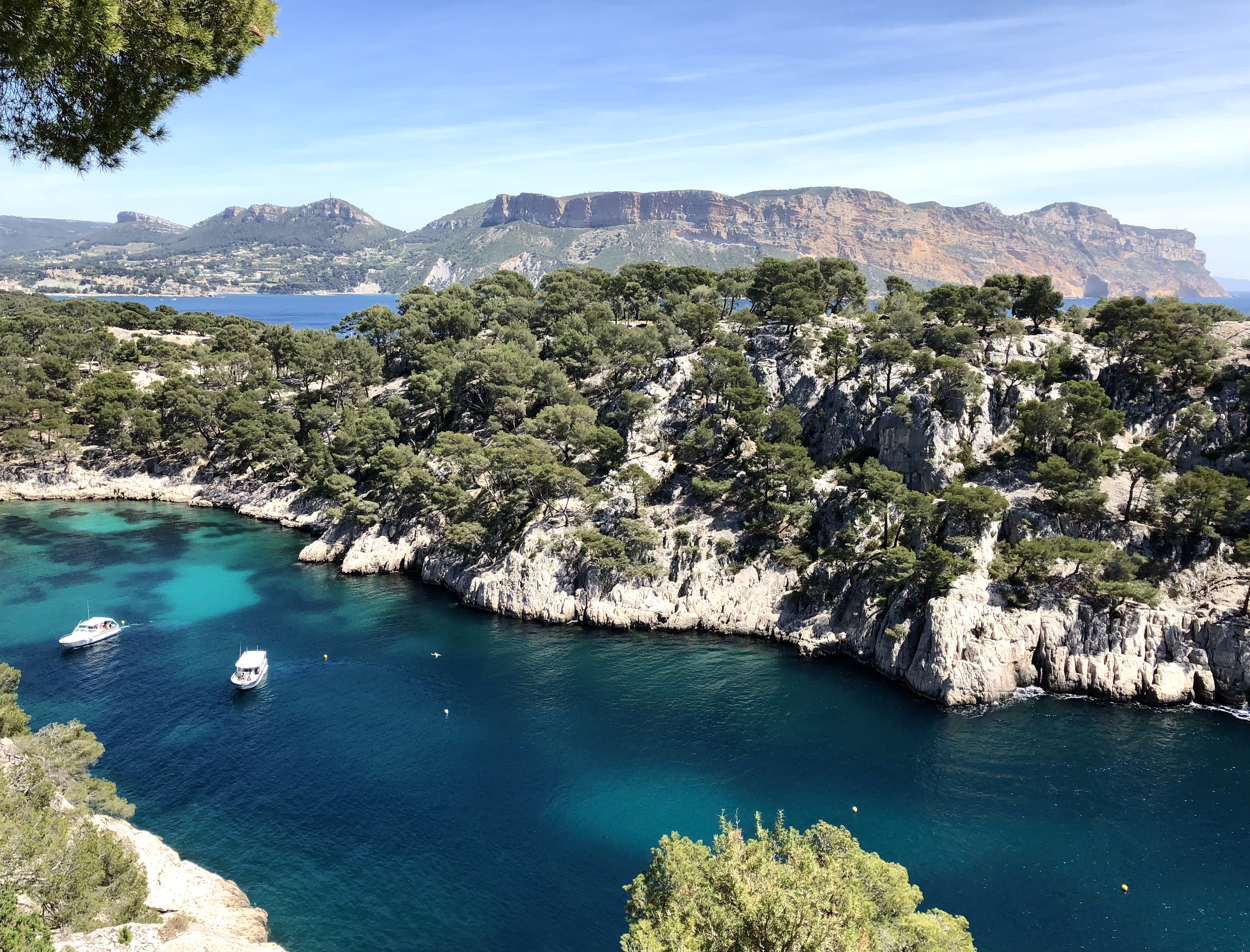
Port-Miou calanque in Cassis

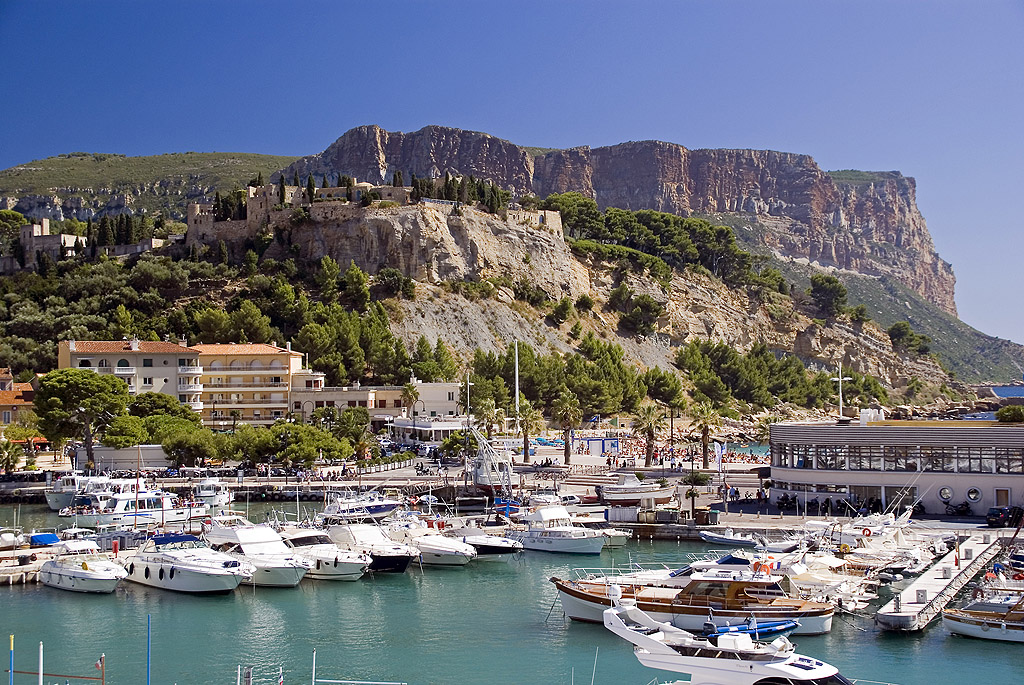
View of the Cassis Harbour

The town is situated on the Mediterranean coast, about 20 kilometres (12 1/2 miles) east of Marseille. Cap Canaille, 394 metres (1,293 feet), between Cassis and La Ciotat ("the civitas") is one of the highest maritime bluffs in Europe, a sailor's landmark for millennia. It is east of Marseille and in the department of Bouches-du-Rhône.

One of its main beaches, called "Bestouan", is made cooler by a karstic source.

== History ==
The present site of Cassis was first occupied between 600 and 500 BC by the Ligures, who constructed a fortified dwelling at the top of the Baou Redon. These people lived by fishing, hunting, and farming.

The current site of Cassis could have been inhabited by the Greeks, though no proof has yet been found.

During Roman times, Cassis was part of the maritime route made by the Emperor Antoninus Pius. It was a small village, established mainly around the Arena and Corton beaches. The principal livelihood was fishing and maritime trade with North Africa and the Middle East. Several archaeological discoveries attest to this.

From the 5th to the 10th centuries AD, invasions by foreign tribes led the population to seek refuge in the castrum, a fortified city that, in 1223, became the property of the Seigneurie des Les Baux-de-Provence.

In the 15th century, Cassis was ceded to the Counts of Provence; then René of Anjou gave the town to the Bishops of Marseille, who ruled the town until the Revolution of 1789.

== Industrial Revolution ==
In the 18th century, Cassis started to develop outside the ramparts of the fortified city and around the port. After the Bourbon Restoration, new industries developed here, including the drying of cod, the manufacture of olive oil and clothing, coral work, wine-making and the exploitation of local stone (cement, limestone). Stone of Cassis, which was quarried here since antiquity made the town famous. It has been used for the quays of the large Mediterranean ports (Alexandria, Algiers, Piraeus, Marseille, and Port Said). A claim that it was used for the base of the Statue of Liberty in New York City gained wide circulation but has been proven apocryphal. Today, the stone is used more for domestic purposes such as the construction of sinks and fireplaces.

In the 20th century, as these industries began to disappear, the workforce turned to tourism and wine making. Cassis was one of the first three vineyards to profit from the appellation d'origine contrôlée (label of controlled origin) introduced in 1936.

== Origin of the name ==
The oldest form is Tutelæ Charsitanæ, attested since the first century. It then drifts into Carsicis (15th century) and Castrum Cassitis (1323). These place names suggest a Car-s theme derived from the pre-Indo-European *Kar meaning stone or rock, to which has been added the suffix -ite. The French language has retained the Provençal Cassis spelling, which is identical in both the classical and Mistralian standards.

The final "s" is not pronounced in the local variant of Provençal, unlike other dialects. The pronunciation of the final "s" is found in the motto of the city, which rhymes Paris, Cassis and the word 'vist' with one another (pronunciation in Provençal "mistralien": /pa.ʁis/, /ka.sis/, /vis/). In French, both pronunciations occur.

The Provençal motto of the commune attributed to Frédéric Mistral is "Qu'a vist Paris, se noun a vist Cassis, n'a rèn vist", which means "Who has seen Paris and not Cassis, has not seen anything".

== Twin towns/sister cities ==
Cassis is twinned with:

- Burnham-on-Sea, United Kingdom
- Portofino, Italy
- Alushta, Ukraine

== Notable residents ==
- Jean-Jacques Barthélemy, (1716–1795), writer and numismatist, was born in Cassis.
- Henri Crémieux, stage and film actor, died at his house in Cassis. The Allée Henri Crémieux is named in his honour.
- Jerome Hill, (1905–1972), American filmmaker and philanthropist
- René Leriche (1879–1955), distinguished surgeon, died in Cassis. The Avenue du Professeur René Leriche is named in his honour.
- Rudy Ricciotti (born 1952), architect whose works include the Musée des Civilisations de l'Europe et de la Méditerranée and the Jean Cocteau Museum, was resident in Cassis as of 2012.
- Jean-Pierre Teisseire (born 1940), politician and retired professor of political science at the University of Aix en Provence, was the mayor of Cassis from 1995 to 2008.
- Michel Platini (born 1955), football player, manager and administrator
- Adil Rami (born 1985), Moroccan–French professional footballer who played as a central defender for French club Olympique de Marseille

== Population ==
Historical population

Year	Pop.	±% p.a.
1793	2,300	—
1800	1,878	−2.85%
1806	2,065	+1.59%
1821	1,846	−0.74%
1831	2,050	+1.05%
1836	2,065	+0.15%
1841	2,093	+0.27%
1846	2,069	−0.23%
1851	2,080	+0.11%
1856	2,187	+1.01%
1861	2,038	−1.40%
1866	1,975	−0.63%
1872	1,806	−1.48%
1876	1,809	+0.04%
1881	1,907	+1.06%
1886	1,879	−0.30%
1891	1,974	+0.99%
1896	1,956	−0.18%
1901	1,972	+0.16%

Year	Pop.	±% p.a.
1906	1,980	+0.08%
1911	1,990	+0.10%
1921	2,193	+0.98%
1926	2,354	+1.43%
1931	2,434	+0.67%
1936	2,528	+0.76%
1946	2,769	+0.91%
1954	3,152	+1.63%
1962	3,611	+1.71%
1968	4,852	+5.05%
1975	5,831	+2.66%
1982	6,304	+1.12%
1990	7,967	+2.97%
1999	8,001	+0.05%
2007	7,833	−0.26%
2012	7,560	−0.71%
2017	7,149	−1.11%
2023	6,661	−1.17%

Source: EHESS and INSEE (1968–2023)

== Gallery ==
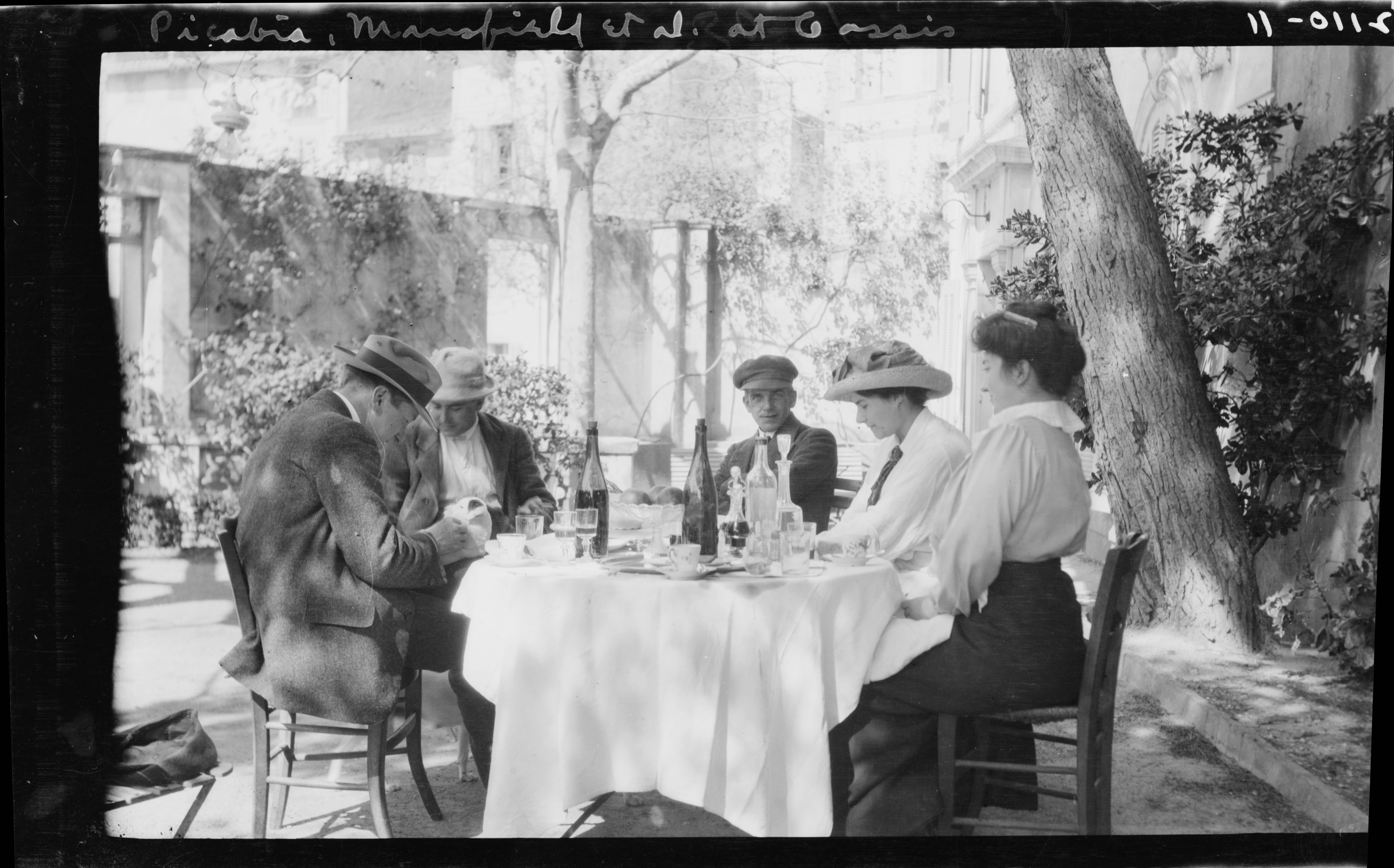
Francis Picabia and friends at an outdoor café in Cassis

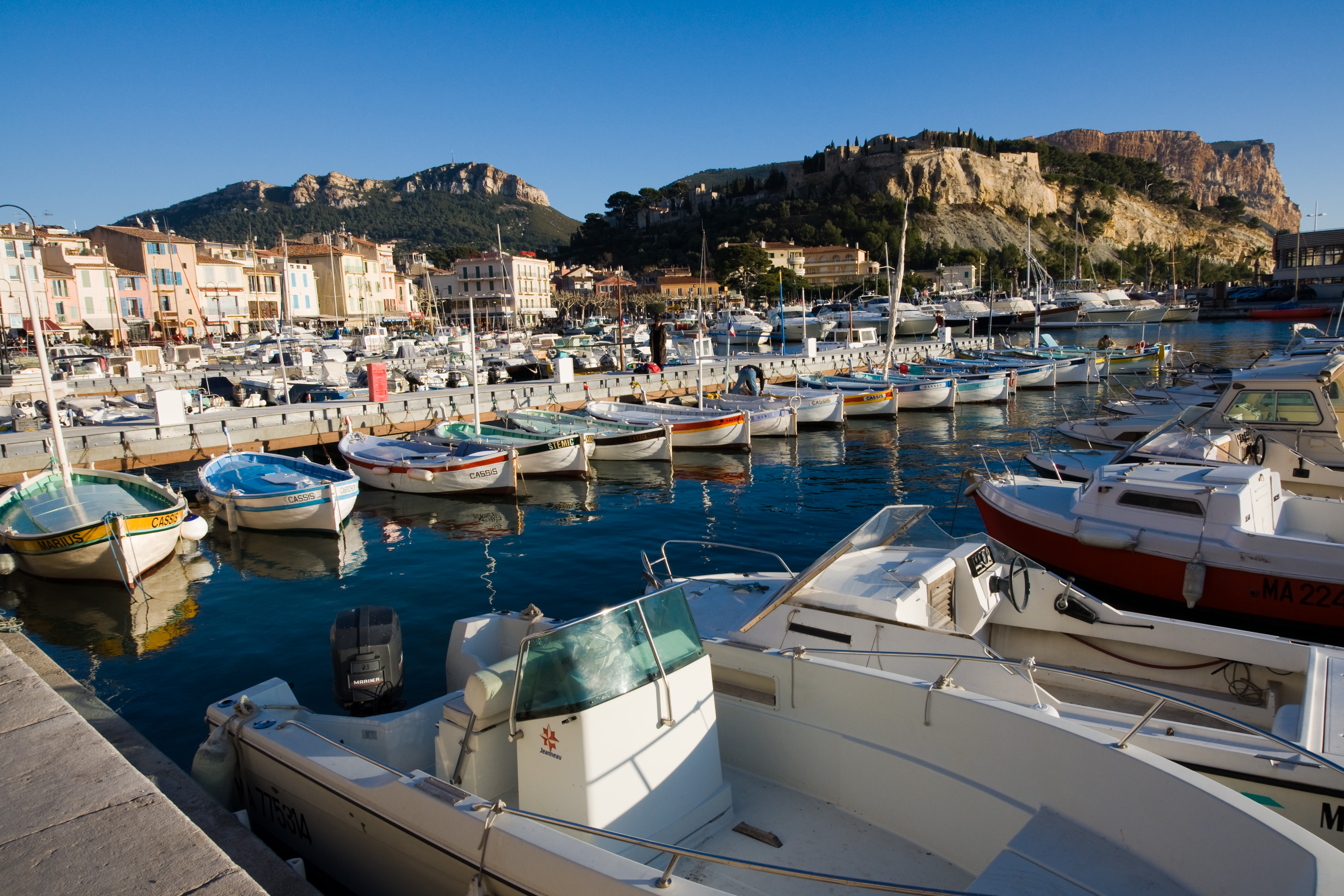
A quay (Port) in Cassis

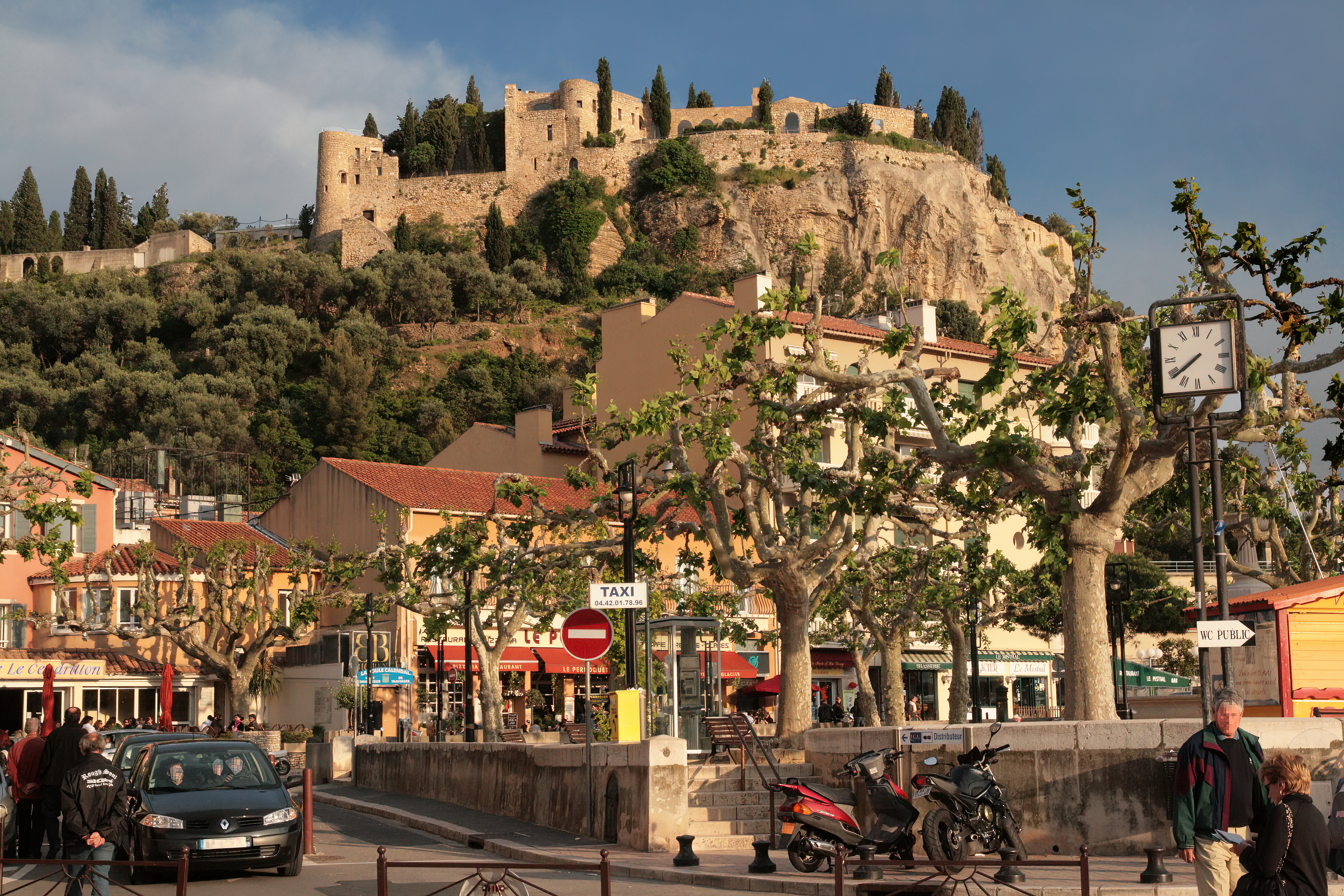
Place Georges Clemenceau and château

== See also ==
- Communes of the Bouches-du-Rhône department
