= Pierre Puget =

French painter, sculptor, architect and engineer (1620–1694)

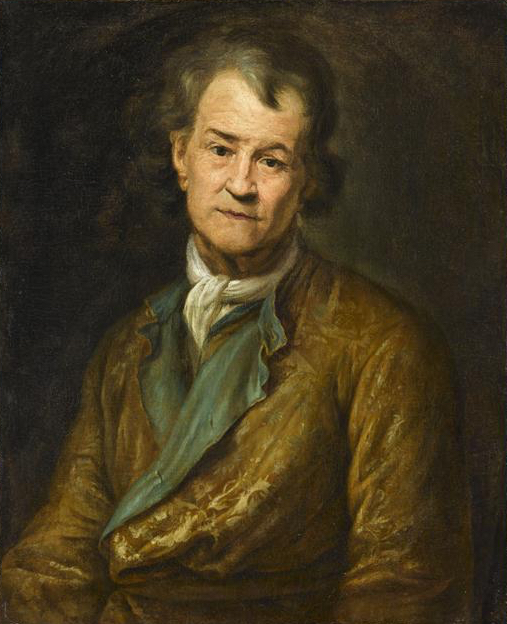
- Pierre Paul Puget, by his son François Puget
- Born: 16 October 1620 (or 31 October 1622; varying sources); Marseille
- Died: 2 December 1694; Marseille
- Known for: Sculpture, painting, architecture
- Movement: Baroque style

Pierre Paul Puget (16 October 1620 or 31 October 1622 – 2 December 1694) was a French Baroque painter, sculptor, architect and engineer. His sculpture expressed emotion, pathos and drama, setting it apart from the more classical and academic sculpture of the Style Louis XIV.

== Biography ==
Puget was born at the home of his father, a stone mason, in the working-class neighborhood of Panier, in Marseille. As his two older brothers were trained as stone masons, he was trained as a woodcarver. He began his career at the age of fourteen, carving the elaborate wooden ornament of the galleys built in the Marseille shipyards. He also showed talent as a painter.

=== Italy ===
In 1640, taking his tools with him, he departed Marseille by sea to Livorno, Italy and then to Florence in search of an atelier which would employ him as a carver or painter. He carved some decorative panels in Florence, and then, with a good recommendation from his employer, and samples of his paintings, he went to Rome and presented himself to the painter Pietro da Cortona, one of the early masters of the Baroque style. He assisted Da Cortona in painting of the lavish ceilings of the Palazzo Barberini in Rome and the Palazzo Pitti at Florence.

=== Marseille and Toulon ===
After three years with da Cortona in Rome, he returned to Marseille, bringing with him the decorative tastes of the Italian Baroque. In Livorno, he had made drawings of the highly-ornamented baroque decoration of Tuscan galleys and warships, as well as designs of imaginary ships painted by Cortona for his ceilings. He showed these to Jean Armand de Maillé-Brézé, Grand Admiral of the French fleet, and was given a commission to design a carved medallion for the stern of a new French warship, named for the Queen, Anne of Austria.

The death of the Grand Admiral in 1646 ended his first work in naval decoration. He began painting, mostly religious works, in the style of Annibale Carracci and Rubens. He also received a commission in 1649 to make several public fountains for new squares in Toulon. In 1652 he was commissioned to make baptismal fonts for the Marseille cathedral. From 1662 to 1665, he made a series of paintings for the Cathedral of Marseille.

He was recognized as a painter but still poorly paid; In 1653, he was commissioned by the Brotherhood of Corpus Domini to make two large paintings, The Baptism of Clovis and the Baptism of Constantine (now in the Marseille Museum of Art), for a total of one hundred forty livres, a very small amount for the time and amount of the work. He completed another religious painting, Salvator Mundi, in December 1655. Altogether he is recorded as having painted fifty-six paintings, of which nineteen were documented in 1868 as still existing. A serious illness in 1665 and advice of doctors caused him to abandon painting entirely.

In 1650, he was living in Toulon, and was married there. He turned his attention entirely to sculpture. In 1655, he received his first important commission for the sculptural decoration of the entrance of the Hôtel de Ville in Toulon; he produced a porch supported by muscular atlantes, still in existence on a new municipal building facing the port. He used as his models two of the muscular workers who unloaded ships along the quay in front of the building. Their faces and postures in the sculpture vividly expressed their struggle with the weight on their shoulders. The work was finished in 1657. He was paid fifteen hundred livres, to which the city authorities, pleased with the work, added a supplement of two hundred livres. His work was widely praised, and terra-cotta copies were made and circulated. Puget was converted from a modestly-talented painter to a celebrated sculptor.

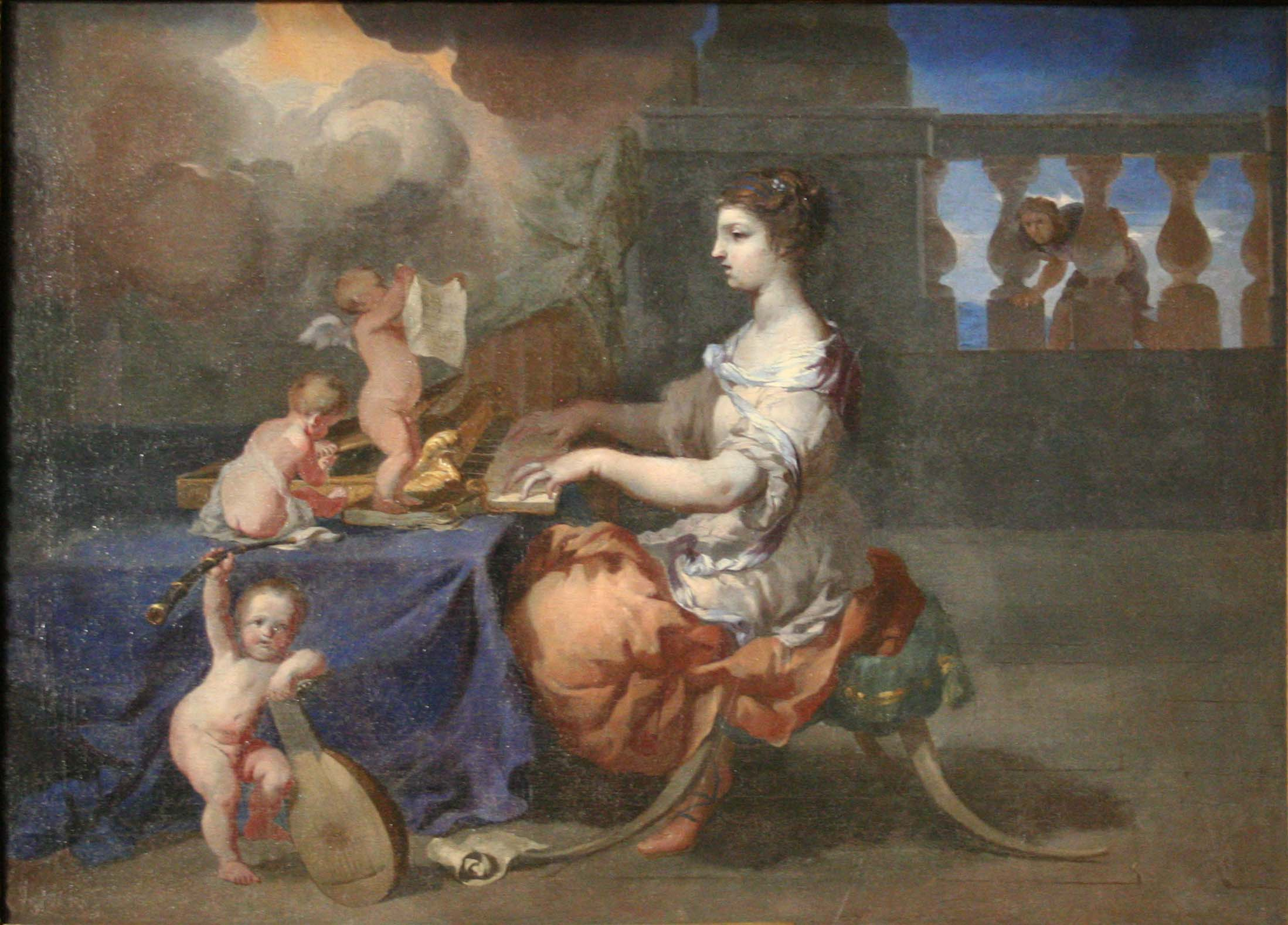
Saint Cecile (1651), (Museum of Fine Arts, Marseille)

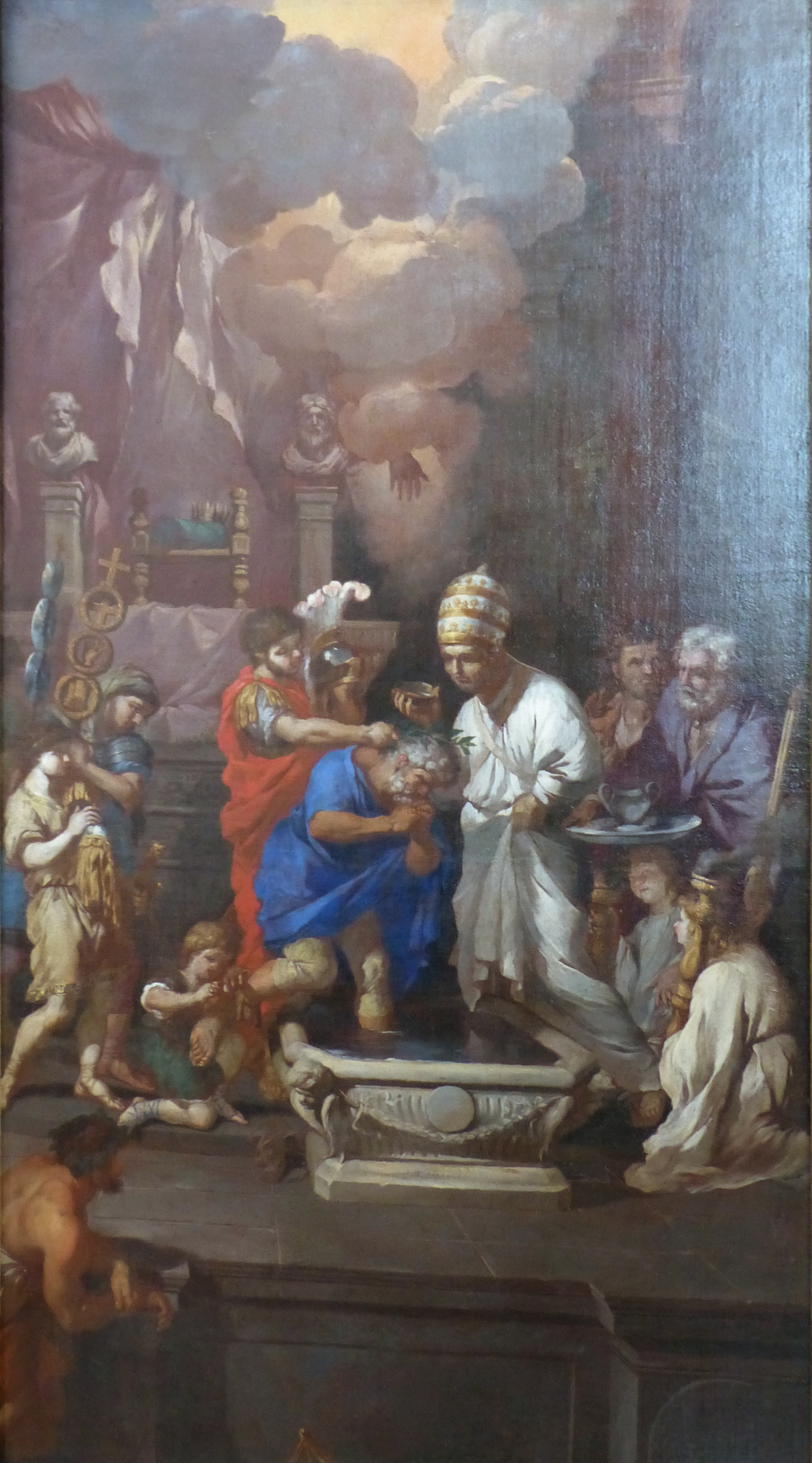
Baptism of Constantine (1653), (Commissioned for Marseille Cathedreal, now in Museum of Fine Arts, Marseille)

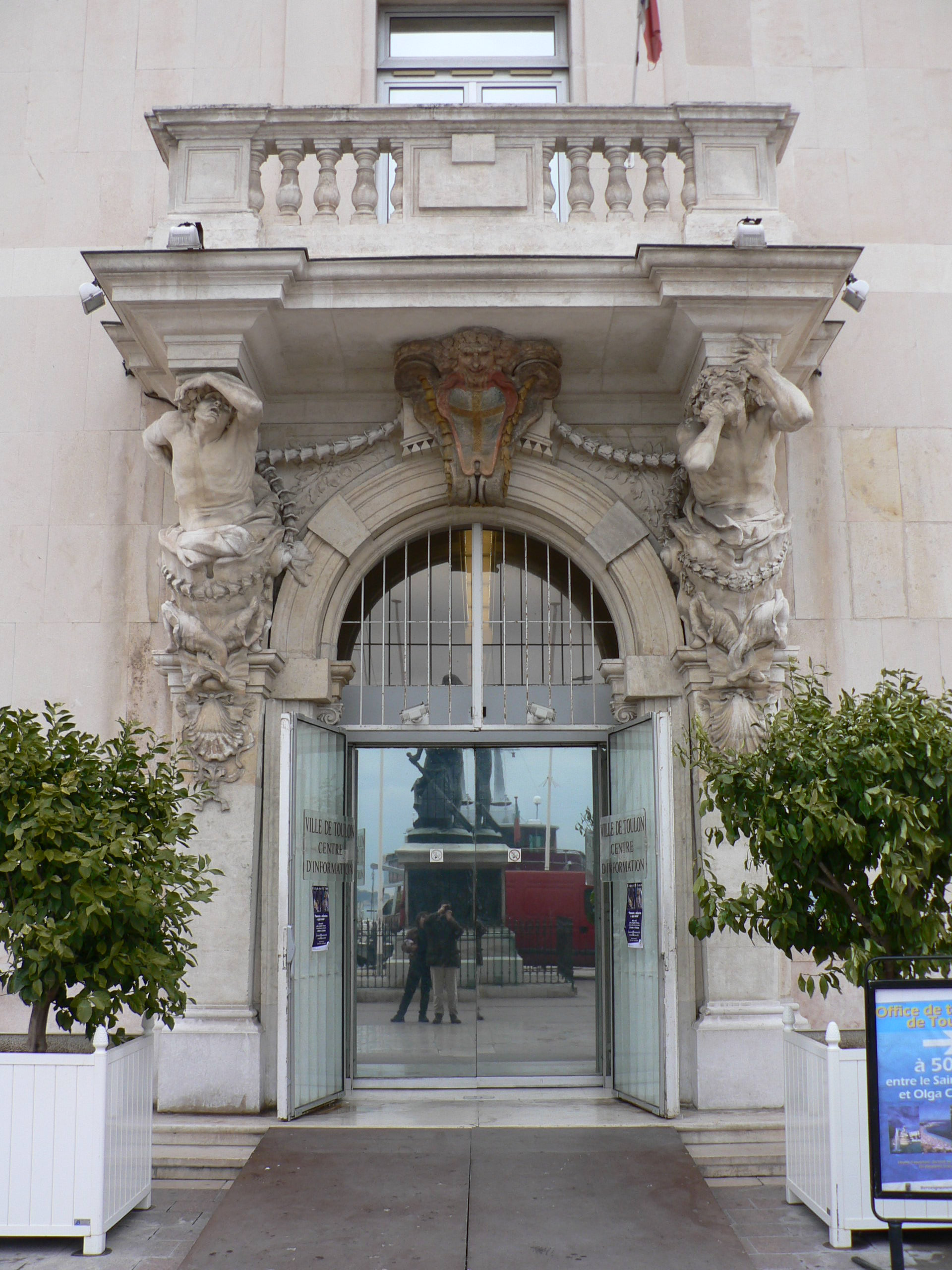
Atlantes on the portal of the Hôtel de Ville de Toulon (1657)

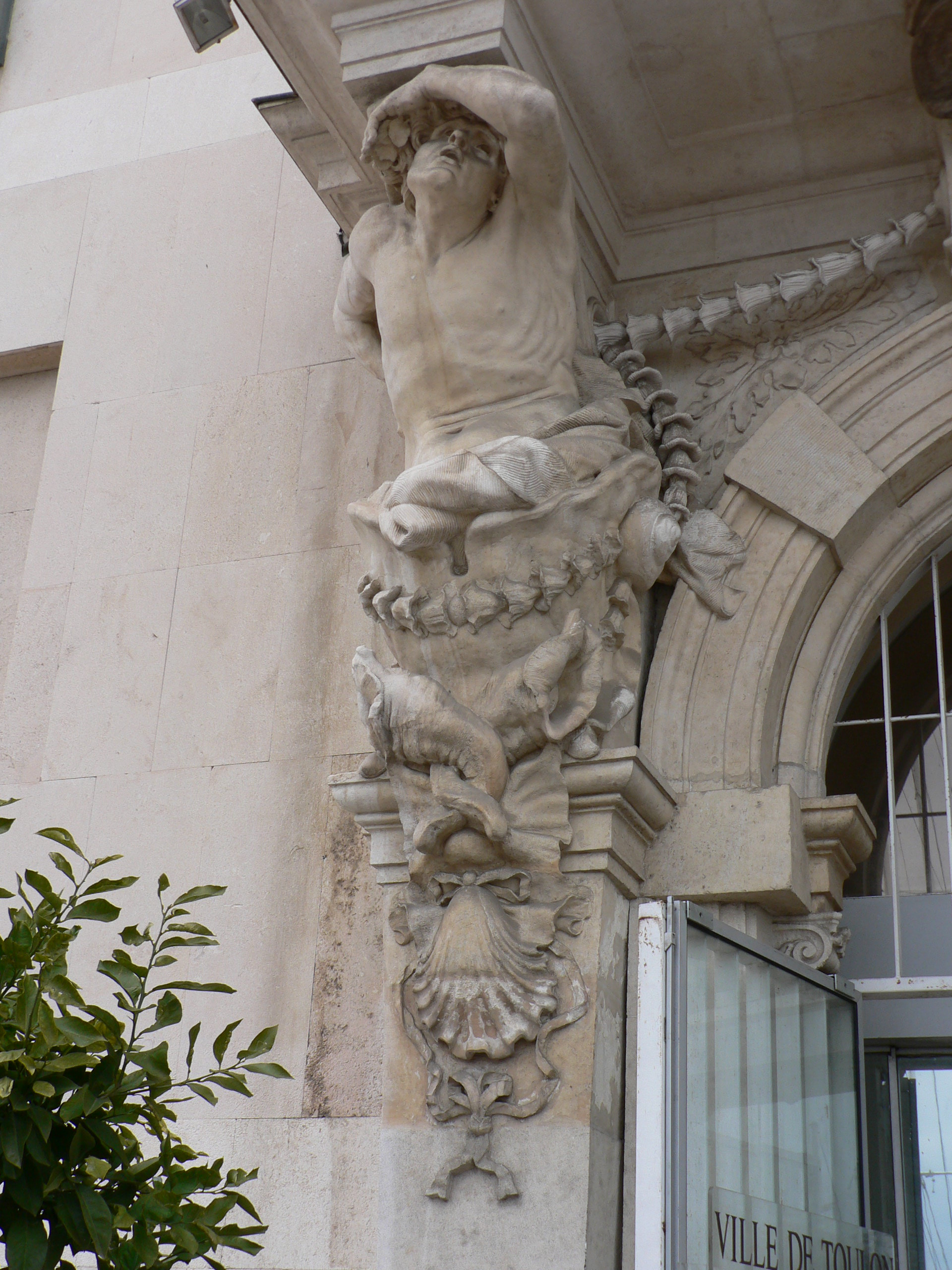
Detail of an atlas on the Hôtel de Ville de Toulon (1657)

=== Vaux-le-Vicomte and Genoa ===
His reputation spread beyond Provence; he was invited to Paris and received a commission from a nobleman named Girardin for two statues, one representing Hercules and the other the Earth and Janus, for a chateau in Normandy. He completed them in Paris in July 1660. He then received an even more important commission from Nicolas Fouquet, the King's Minister of Finance, to make sculpture for Fouquet's new garden at Vaux-le-Vicomte, including a statue of Hercules, the personal symbol of Fouquet. These statues were to be made of marble, which was very expensive and rarely used in Paris at the time. Fouquet sent Puget to Genoa, in Italy, to personally select and bring back the blocks of the best marble While he was preparing his voyage, he received several proposals for sculptural projects from Jean-Baptiste Colbert, the secretary to Cardinal Mazarin, the prime minister, but he refused them, due to his obligations to Fouquet. Colbert did not forget this slight.

In 1660 Fouquet travelled to the quarries of Carrara marble, where he selected the marble he wanted, chose a Genoese sailor as the model, and in Genoa made the statue that became known as the Hercules of Gaul. However, on 5 September 1661, Fouquet was arrested and imprisoned, on the accusations of Colbert, for taking government funds for his own use. The statue commissioned for Fouquet's garden was later sent instead to the Château de Sceaux, Colbert's more modest residence. It is now in the Louvre.

Puget decided to stay for a time in Italy, making long visits to Rome and Genoa. His principal patron in Italy was an Italian nobleman, Francesco Maria Sauli. His major works during this period were two monumental statues for the pillars of the church of Santa Maria di Carignano, representing Saint Sebastian and Bishop Alexander Paoli. They were completed in 1663, and showed the influence of Bernini. He also made a notable statue, The Immaculate Conception, for the French patron Emmanuel Brignole, for the chapel of an Albergo in Genoa. The Genoese senate proposed that he paint their council chamber, but he declined, to devote all his attention to sculpture.

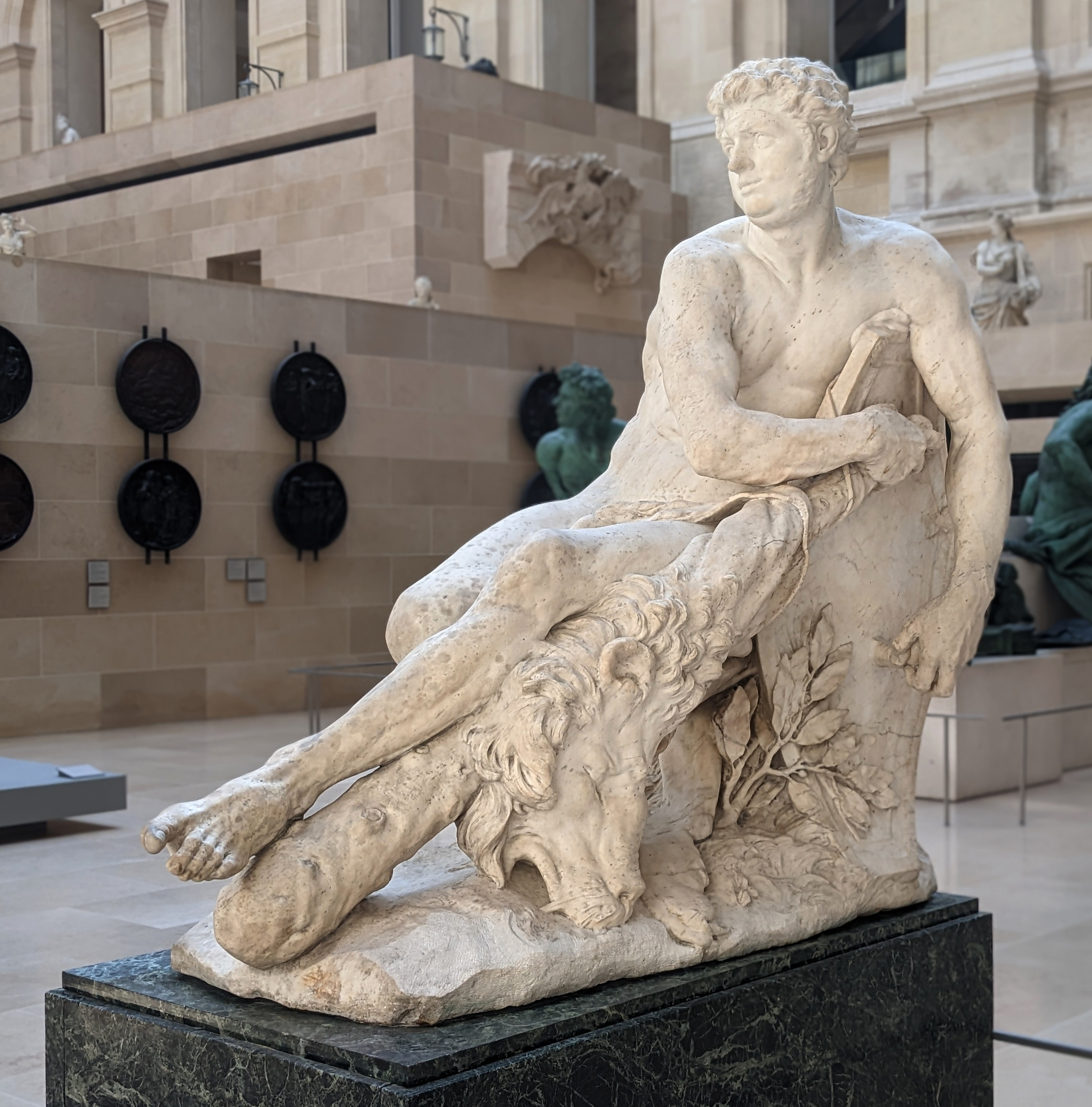
The Hercules of Gaul, originally made for Fouquet, Paris, Louvre (1661)

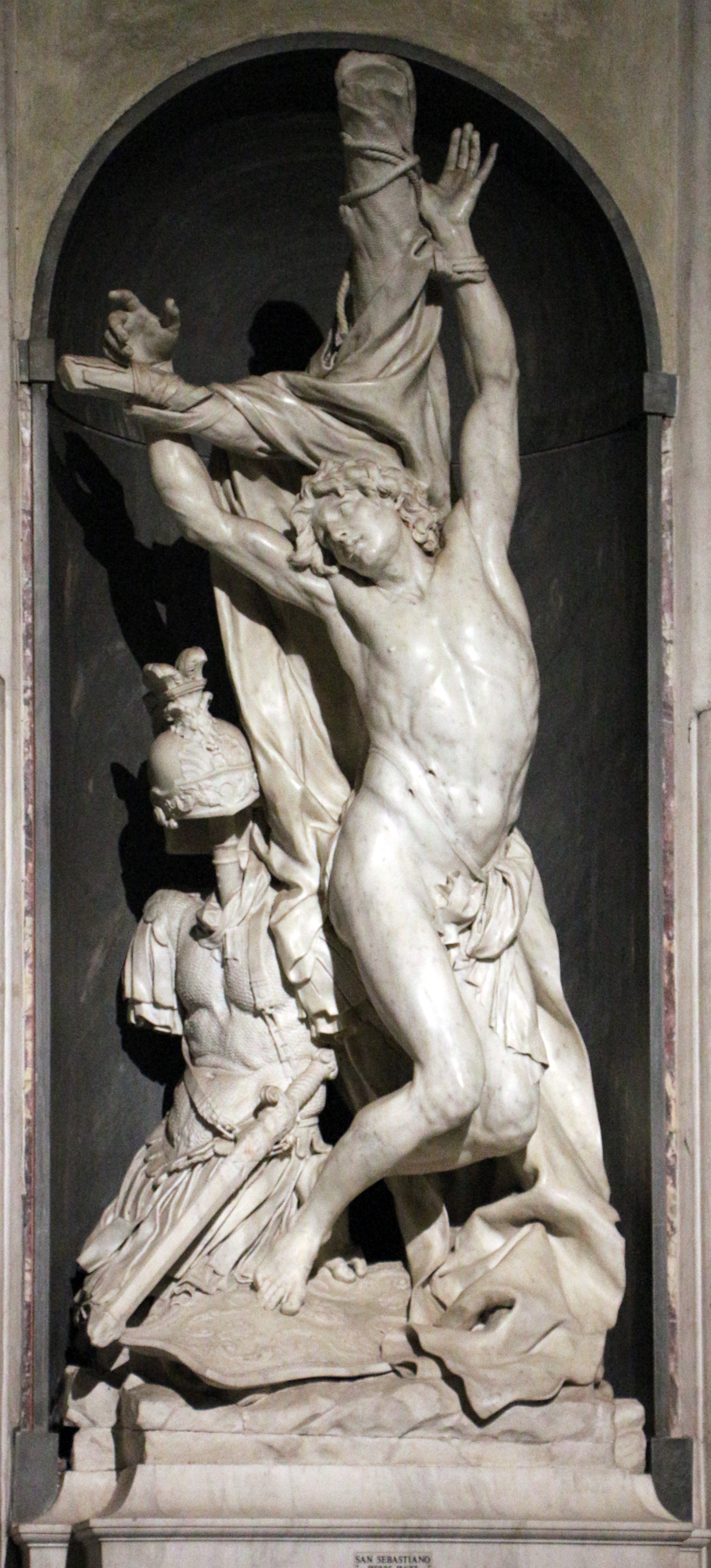
Saint Sebastian at Santa Maria Assunta, Genoa (1668)

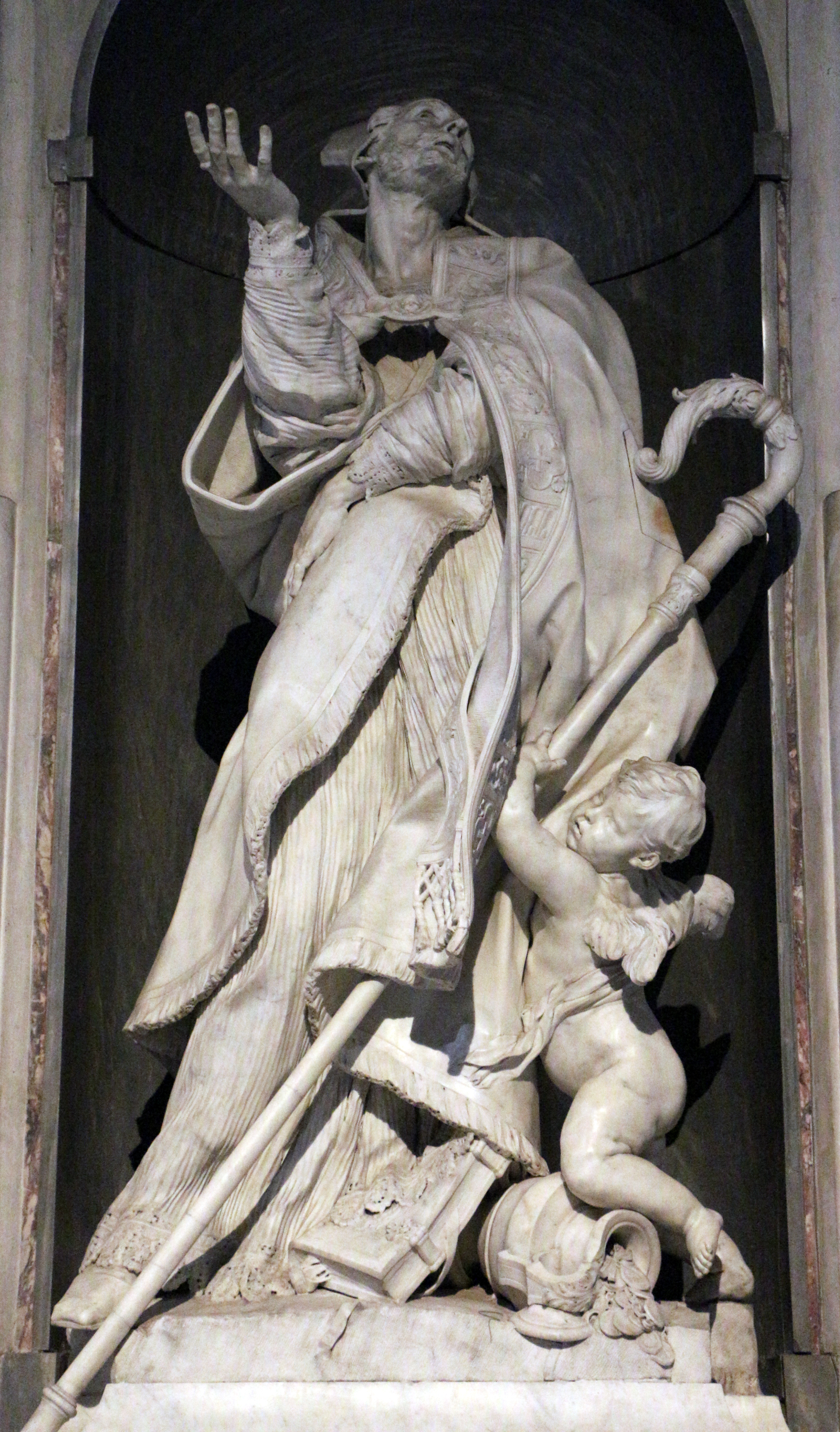
Saint Alexander Sauli (1668)

=== Toulon and Marseille: naval architecture ===
He returned to France in 1669 and divided his time between Toulon and Marseille. He was offered the position chief of decoration for French warships, but before accepting he sent a list of his demands to Colbert; among others, he insisted on being considered an officer, not a worker; and to have final authority for designs, over that of the King's official artists, the painter Charles Le Brun and the royal sculptor François Girardon. This was entirely unacceptable to Colbert. Colbert gave Girardon, not Puget, the commission to decorate the Royal Louis, the major new warship of the French fleet. The French fleet needed new ships, and Puget was charged with decorating, ten new men-of-war, as well as designing elegant new building for the headquarters of the fleet.

Puget continued to work on other sculptural and artistic projects in Toulon, He sculpted a large marble group of the Virgin and Child for the church of Lorgues and created a monumental wooden retable still in place, for Toulon Cathedral. In addition, he designed town houses in Aix-en-Provence and several municipal buildings in Marseille, including the fish market (still in place) and the La Vieille Charité, originally a home for beggars and the indigent, now a cultural center.

Puget's view of naval architecture soon clashed with the views of the new Commissioner of Fortifications, the Chevalier de Clairville. Clairville changed all of the Puget's plans, removed decoration he considered unnecessary, and rejected his elegant new headquarters building. Puget appealed to Colbert, but Colbert sided with Clairville. At the end of 1669, Puget took a leave of absence and departed the dockyards for his traditional sanctuary, Genoa, where he made a series of works, including The Virgin (1670), now in the oratory of the Church of Saint Philippe de Néri.

When he returned to the dockyards in June 1670, he found they were commanded by a new officer, and that the decoration of ships he had begun had been given to others. He also learned that, upon the instructions of Colbert, any work he did had to be approved at higher levels by Le Brun and the senior sculptors in Paris. He was to design only what he was told to design. Furthermore, Colbert presented a new argument; British ships had little or no sculptural decoration, and they usually won battles. Therefore French ships should also be without sculpture.

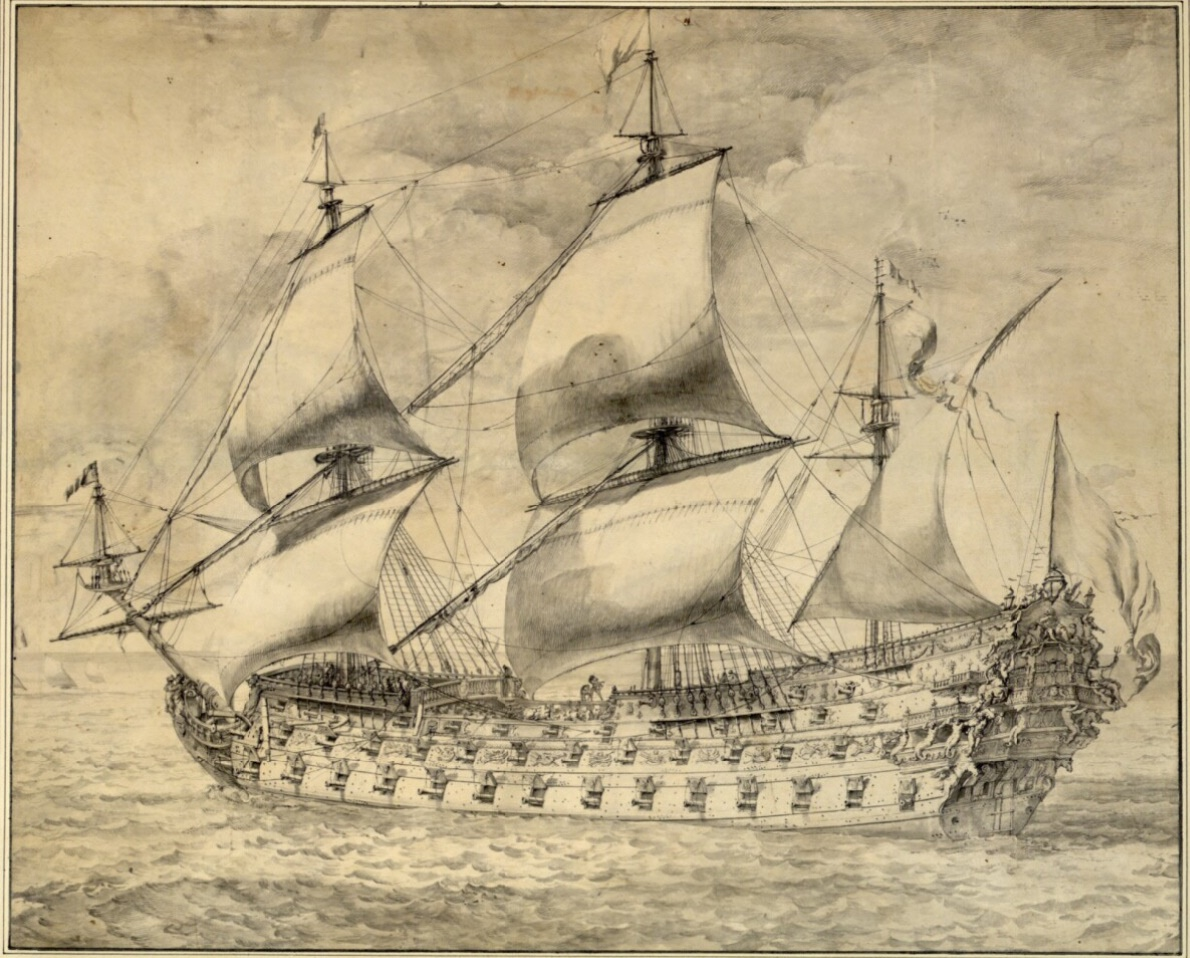
Drawing by Puget of the warship Royal Louis, showing his sculptural decoration on the stern

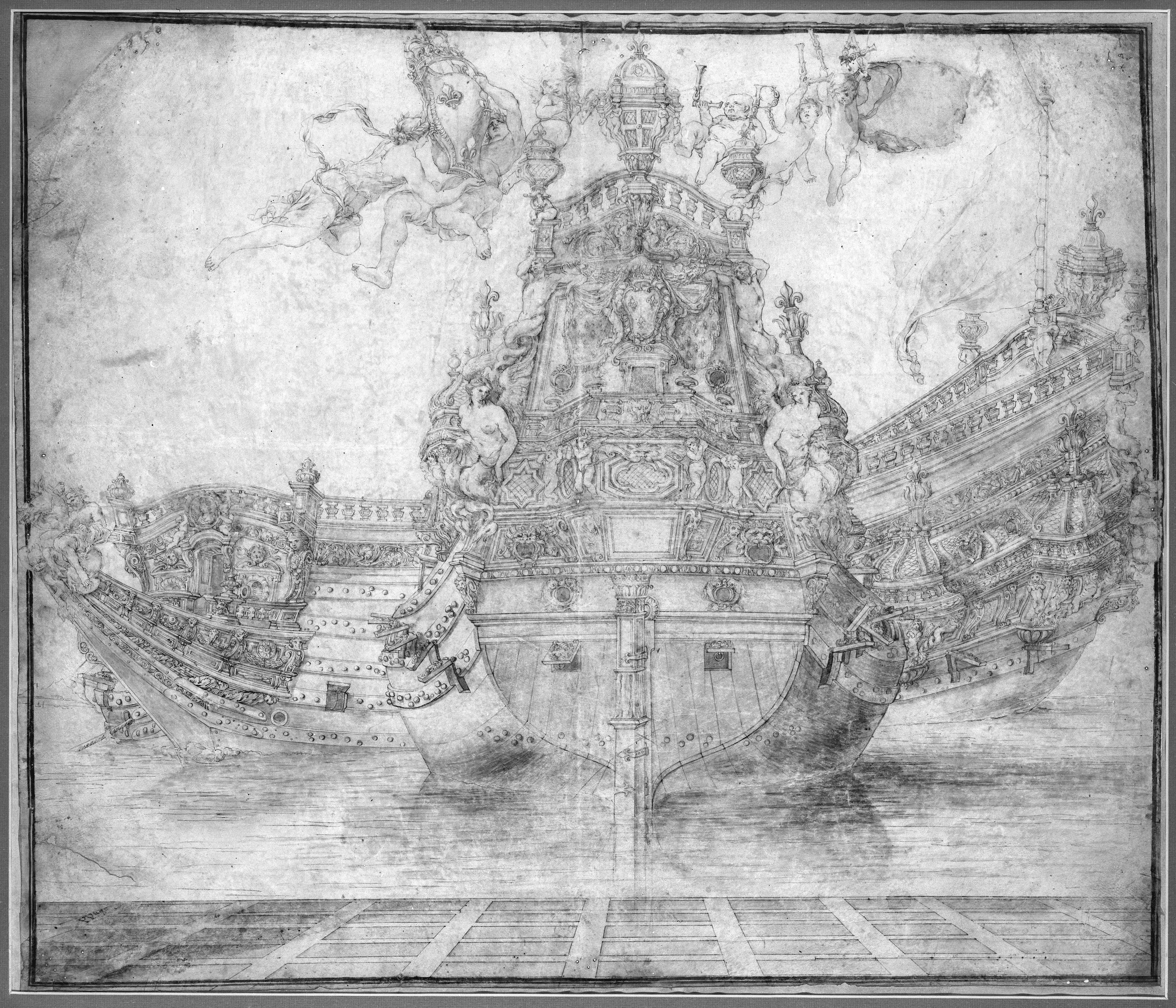
Design for decoration of a warship

=== Marseille, architecture and urban design ===
In 1672, having no further work at the Naval Arsenal, Puget returned to his birthplace, Marseille. His first project was a new urban square and street, the Cours Saint-Louis, and rue Canabière. It took much of its inspiration from the urban planning and architecture of Genoa, and resembled on a small scale the later urban projects of Baron Haussmann and Napoleon III in Paris. He also created an ornate sculptural plaque with the coat of arms of the King to decorate the facade of the Hôtel de Ville. He designed a new fish market, completed in 1672, which is still in use, and La Vieille Charité, begun in 1679, originally a home for beggars and the indigent, now a cultural center. In addition, he designed town houses in Aix-en-Provence, including the Hotel d'Aiguilles (1675), a baroque mansion.

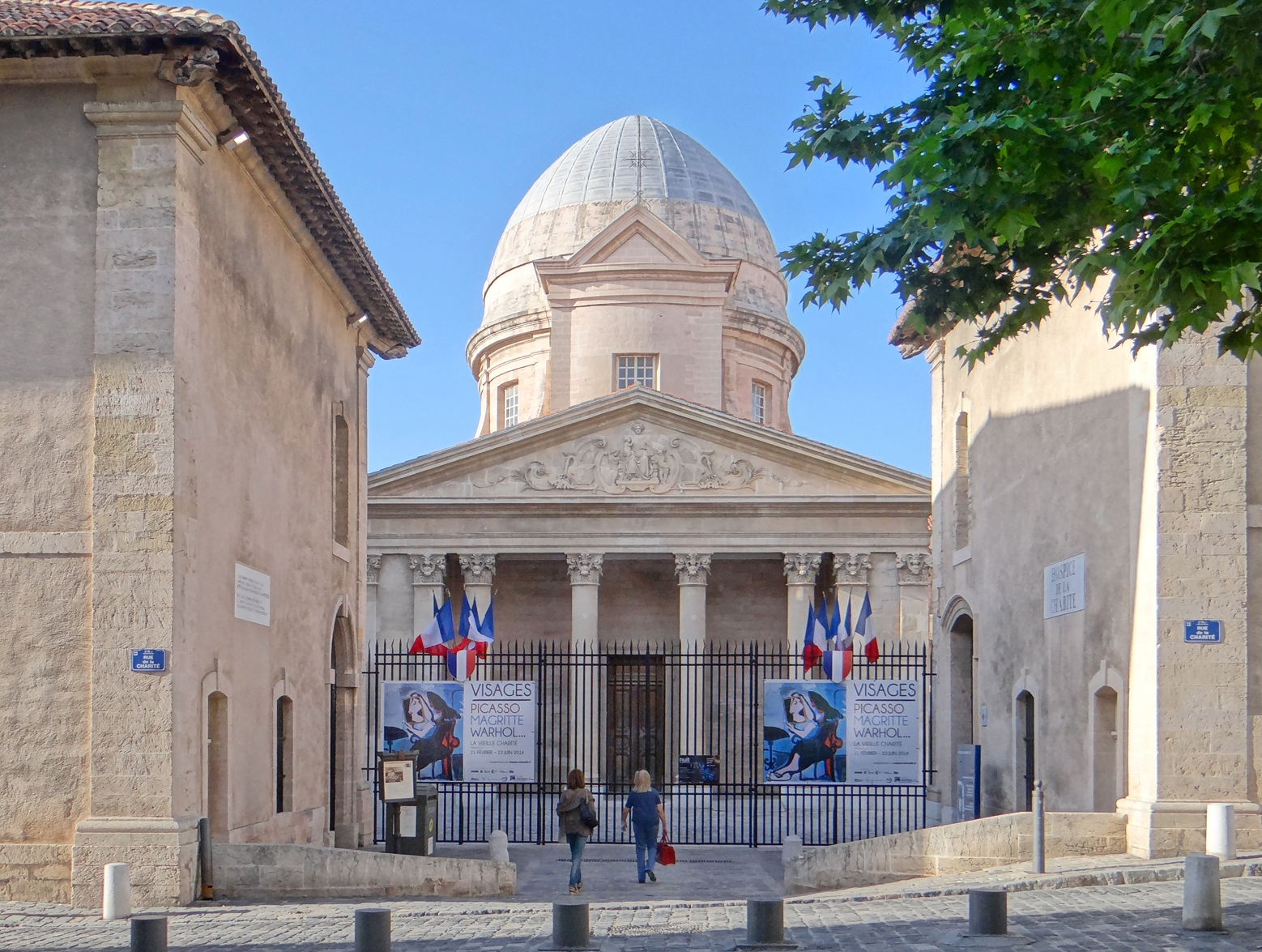
Vielle Charité in Marseille, home for indigent and beggars (begun 1671)

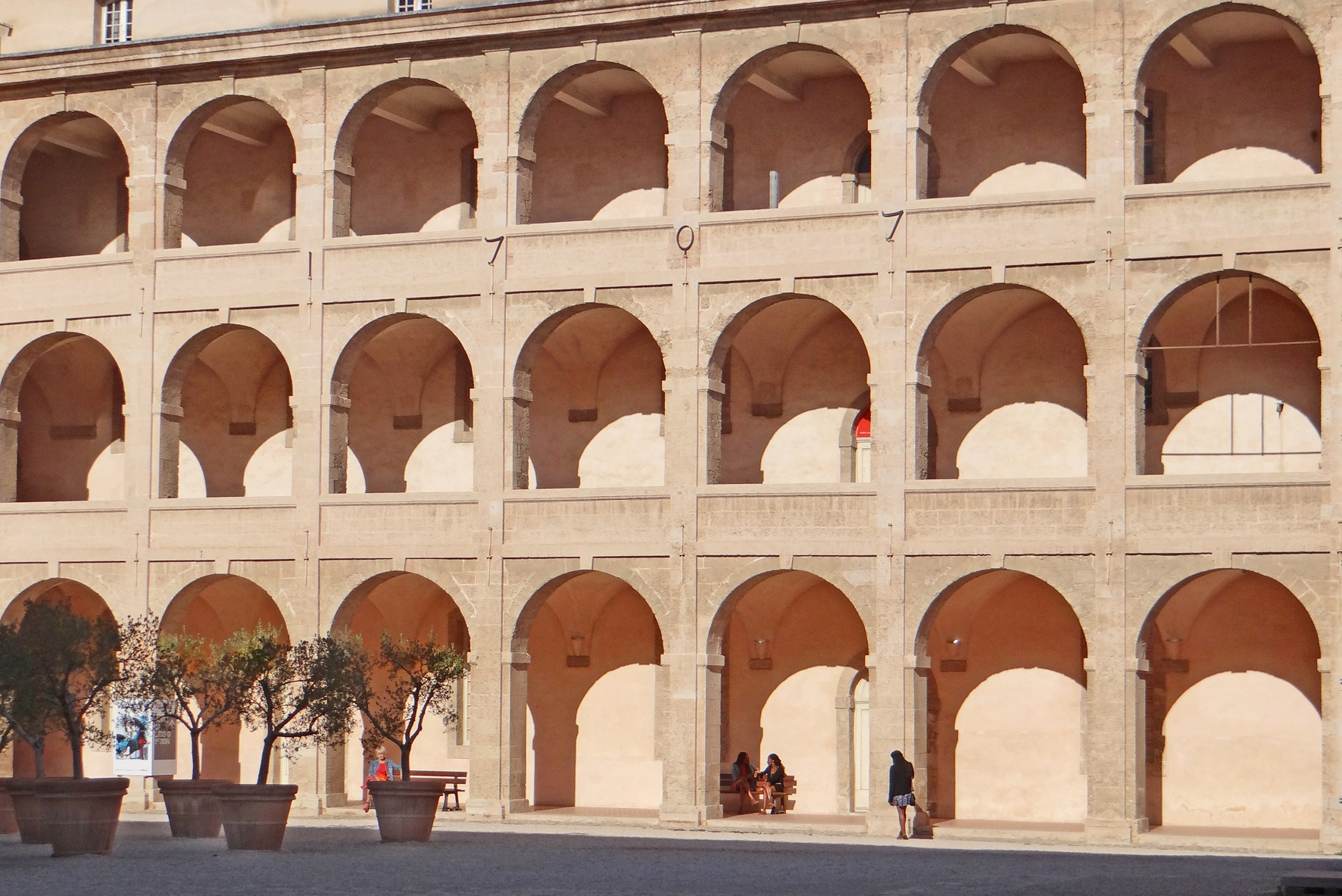
Vielle Charité in Marseille (begun 1671)

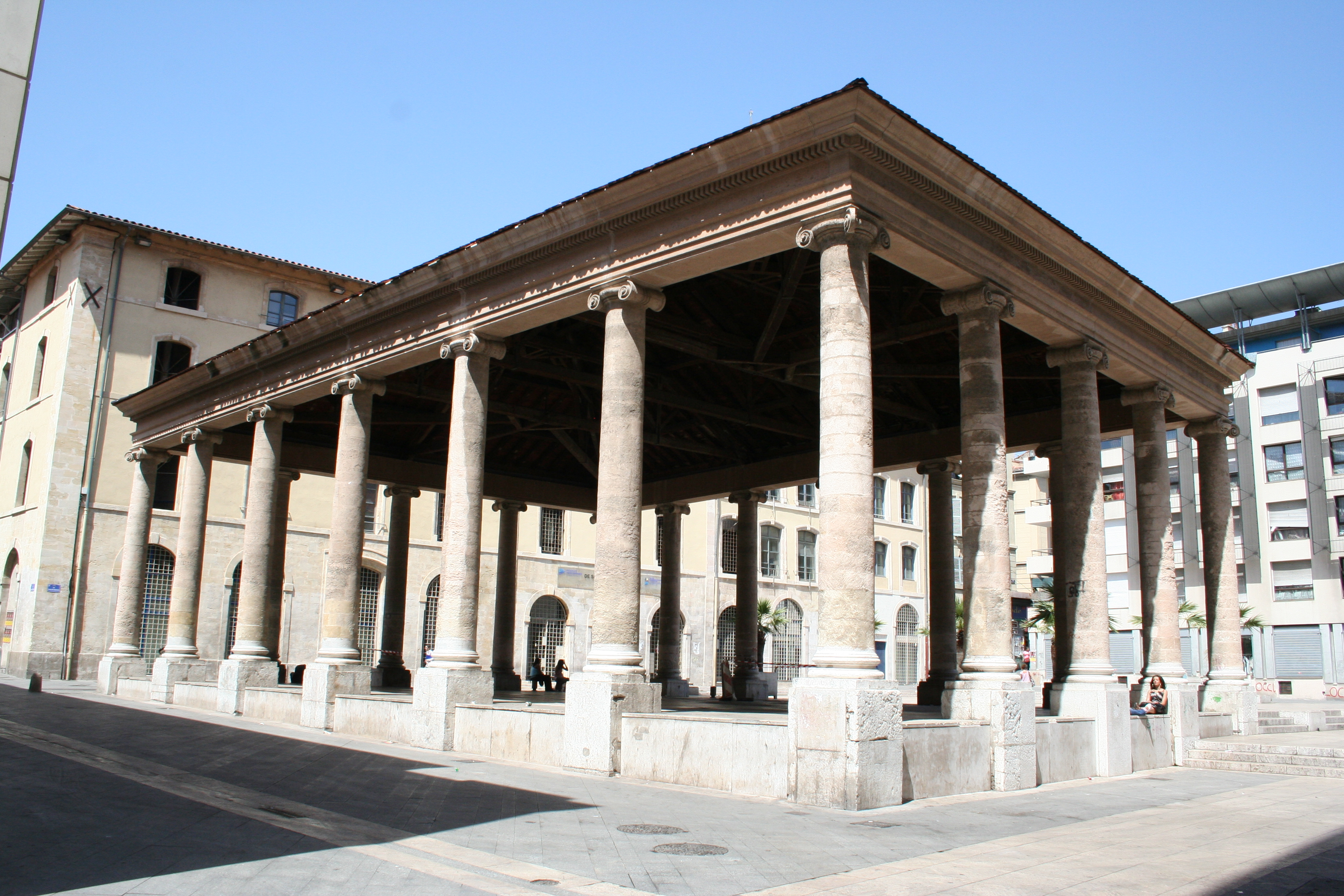
The Hall Puget, or fish market, in Marseille

=== Versailles: Milon of Croton ===
Puget had still not broken into the exclusive group of sculptors who were receiving royal commissions for the statuary of the new gardens of Versailles. He still possessed several blocks of fine marble from Genoa, In 1671 he sent to Colbert designs for two large-scale statues, Milon of Croton (now in the Louvre) and the bas-relief Alexander and Diogenes (1685, now in the Louvre). Colbert disliked Puget's personality but admired his skill; on 13 May 1672, he offered Puget a commission to make the two statues. Puget was occupied with his tasks for the city of Marseille, and did not begin work until 1672. The impatient Colbert wrote to Puget, demanding a report on the statue, and observing that the marble belonged not to Puget, but to the royal government. Puget worked furiously on Milon. However, in 1681, six years after sending the designs, the statue was still not finished; it was finally completed in August, 1682.

Puget's Milon of Croton (1682) is a monumental work, nearly three meters high, is one of his most dramatic and expressive works. Illustrating a story by Ovid, it depicts the moment when Milon de Croton, a celebrated warrior but now elderly and weak, is attacked by a lion. His expression at the moment the lion claws Milon's is distorted by pain, and is full of pathos. This work was satisfactory to Colbert, was purchased by the royal government, and given a prominent place in the Gardens of Versailles. Puget, in the meantime, had begun on another monumental statue for Versailles, of Andromeda.

Colbert died the following year and was replaced by as superintendent of royal buildings by François-Michel le Tellier, Marquis de Louvois. A month after Colbert's death, Louvois wrote to Puget for a report on other works that Puget was making, and asking how old he was. Puget responded that he was sixty years old and that he was working with great enthusiasm on his monumental statue of Perseus Andromeda (completed 1684, now in the Louvre) and the bas-relief Alexander and Diogenes (completed 1685, the Louvre). "I was raised making great works..." Puget wrote to Louvois, "The marble trembles before me, no matter how large it is." The two works were completed, loaded on ships in Toulon, and were placed in the gardens of Versailles.

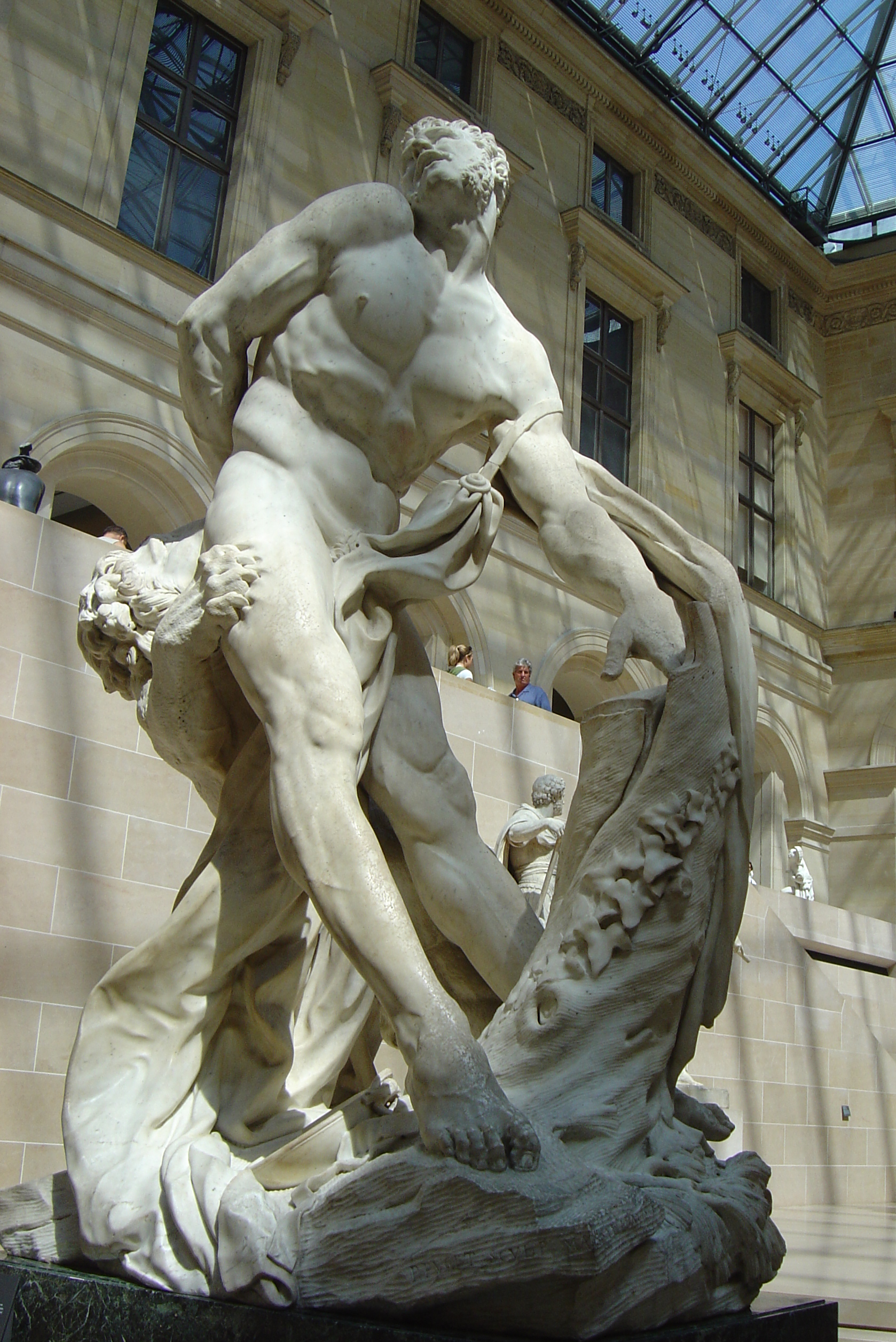
Milo of Croton (the Louvre)

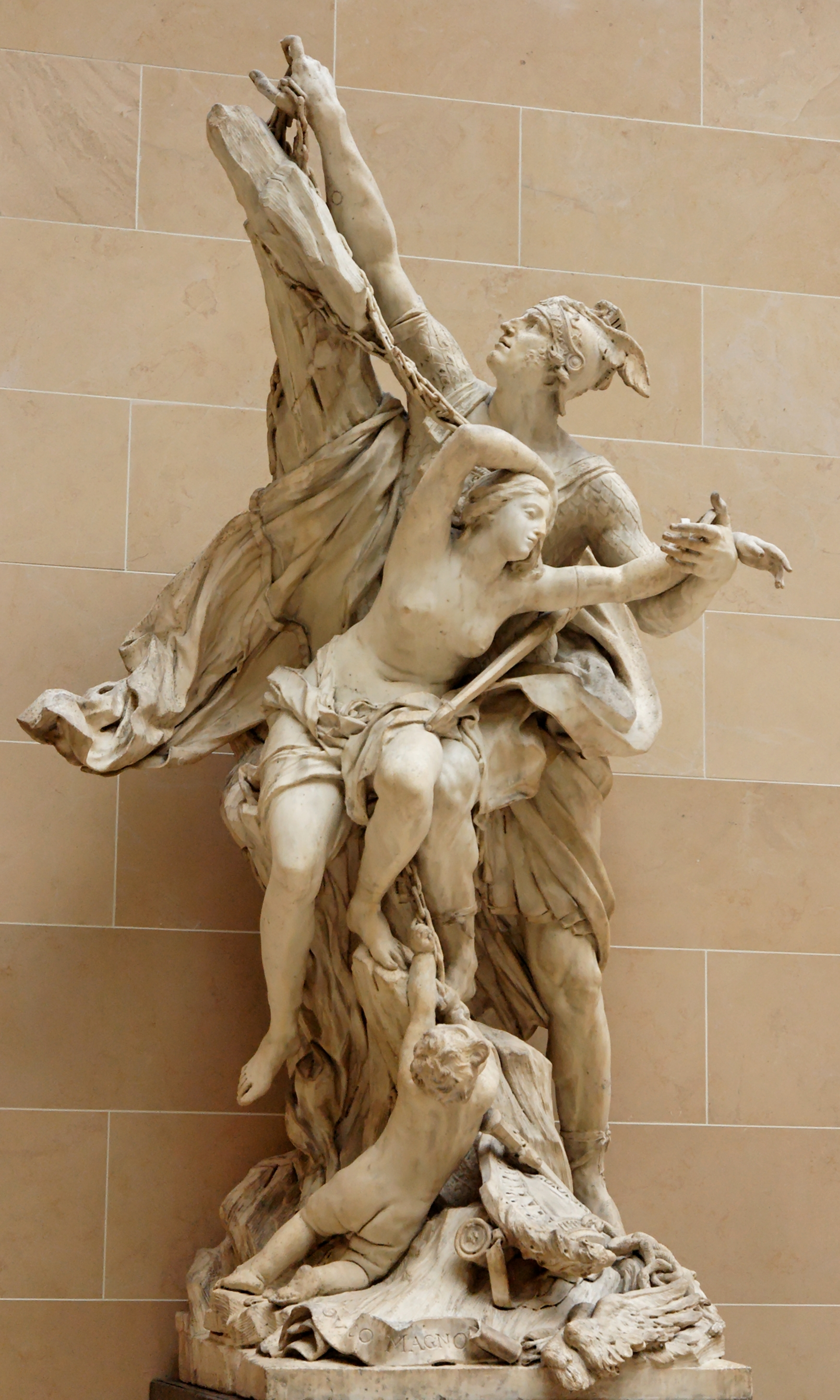
Perseus and Andromeda, the Louvre

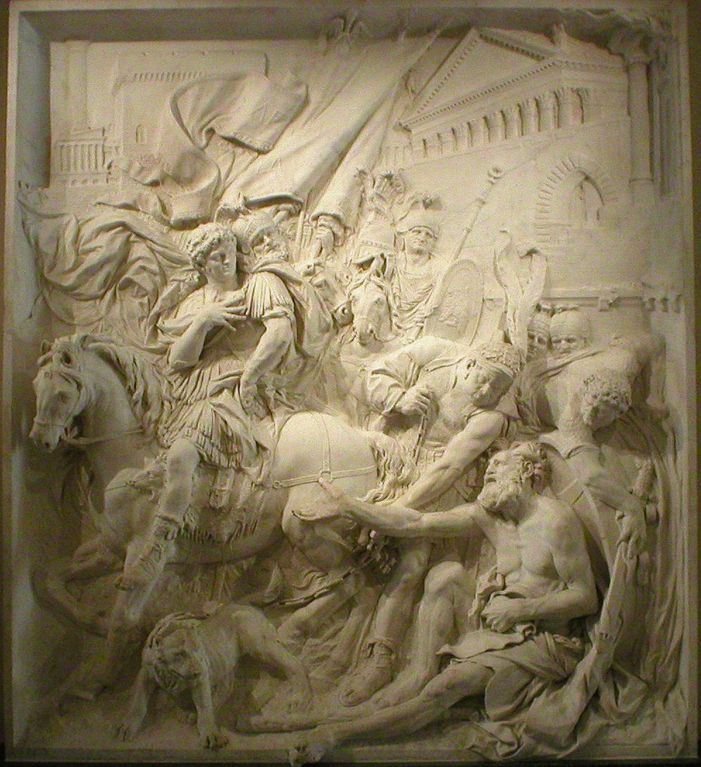
sculpted plaque of Diogenes and Alexander the Great, the Louvre (1692)

=== Marseille and the Louis XIV statue ===
In 1665, he proposed an even more ambitious commission, to design a new city square next to the port of Marseille, with, as the centerpiece, a monumental equestrian statue of Louis XIV, facing the harbor. Similar monuments had been constructed in Paris, in Place Vendôme and Place des Victoires. He designed both the statue and the architecture of the square, which was actually an oval, surrounded by a majestic marble colonnade, to complement the statue. The only question was money; the royal government expected the city of Marseille to finance the project.

Puget made one of his rare trips to Versailles to promote the project in person to the King, on 29 November 1687. The King expressed his admiration of the project, as did his consort, Madame de Maintenon; but the soon-to-be chief royal architect, Jules Hardouin-Mansart, pointed out that it would be more attractive and efficient to build a square, rather than an oval, and a more modest project. Mansart himself had designed both Place Vendome and Place des Victoires, and his views were accepted by the King, much to the distress and anger of Puget. Work went ahead on the project, following the new plan. The marble was delivered for the statue, and Puget's friends in Genoa sent a magnificent horse to serve as a model. Puget remained adamant and declared he would not make the statue until the city square, in an oval shape, was constructed for it. The Echevins, or city council, decided they preferred the simpler and less expensive square design, but Puget was adamant. Puget made another trip to Versailles to try to persuade the King to accept his project, but the King declined to see him. The Echevins of Marseille abandoned Puget and selected a different and little-known sculptor, Clérion, and Puget was excluded from the project. In the end, neither the square nor the statue was made; the outbreak of a war with Holland in 1688 ended for a time any new architectural projects.

The last two works of Puget were the bas-reliefs Alexander and Diogenes and The Plague of Marseille. The last work, depicting a tragic but heroic moment in the city's history, was left unfinished. After his death, it was placed in the Council Chamber of the city of Marseille, where he died in 1694.

In 1882, Adolphe-André Porée discovered a lost statue by Puget on a castle grounds at Biéville-Beuville. He sculpted a large marble group of the Virgin and Child for the church of Lorgues and created a monumental wooden retable still in place, for Toulon Cathedral. Hydra of Lerna was originally in the castle of Vaudreuil, and is now at the Musée des Beaux-Arts de Rouen.

Mont Puget, near Marseille, is named after him.

== Death ==
Puget died in Marseille on 2 December 1694, at the age of seventy-four. He was buried in the cemetery of the church of the Convent of the Observance. The church and the cemetery have disappeared, and there is no marker to show where his remains are buried.

== Sculpture ==
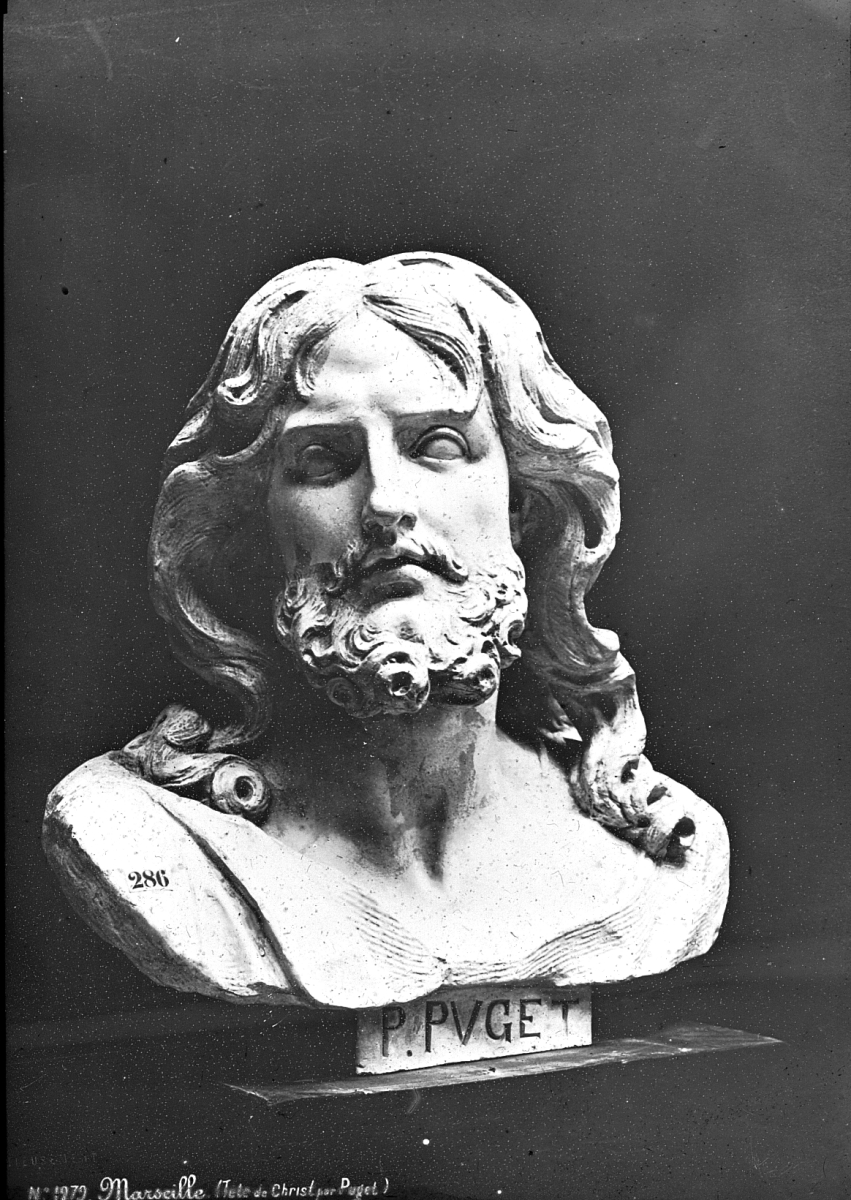
Head of Christ by Puget, Marseille. Brooklyn Museum Archives, Goodyear Archival Collection

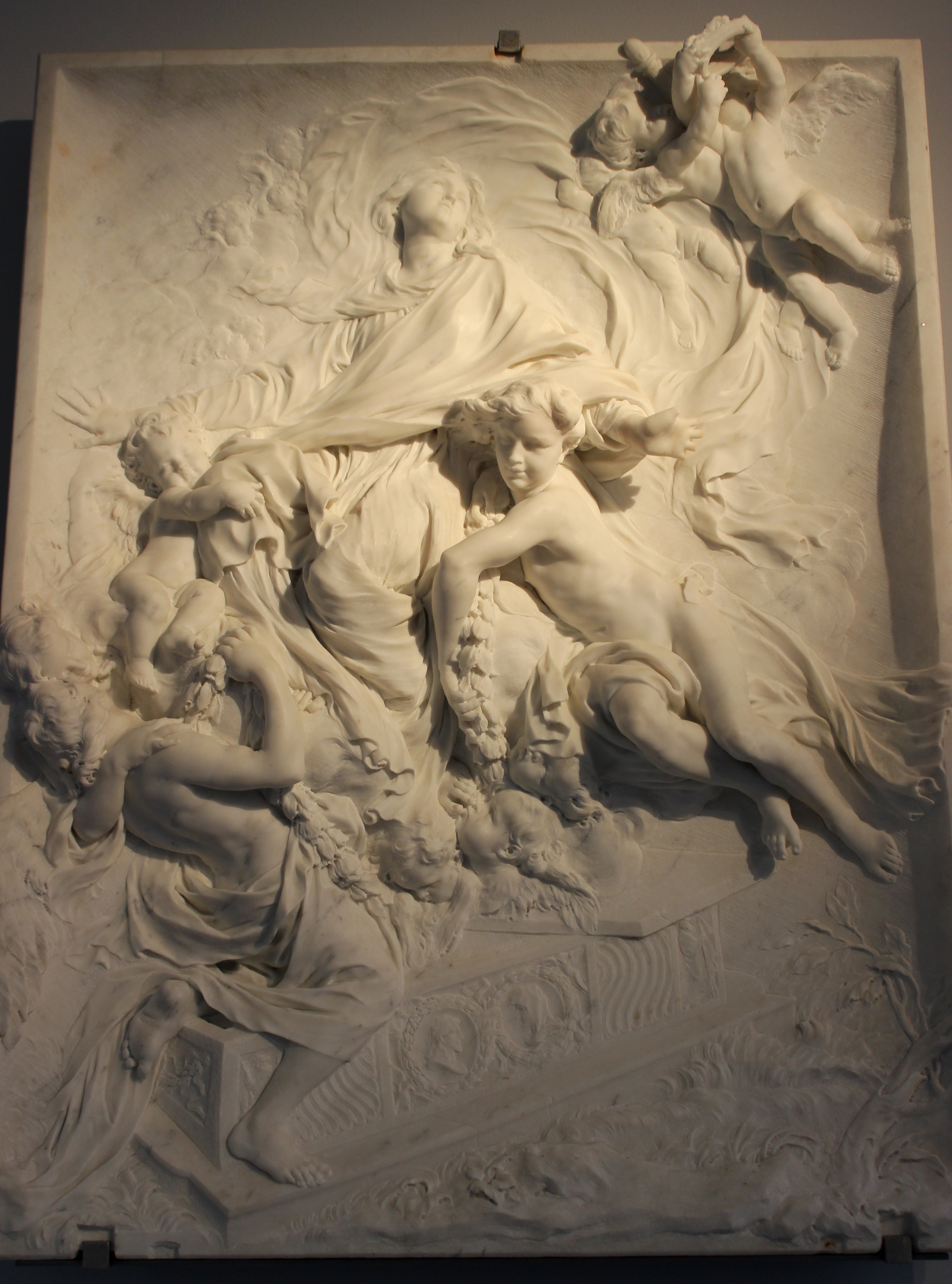
Assumption of the Virgin, Bode Museum, Berlin

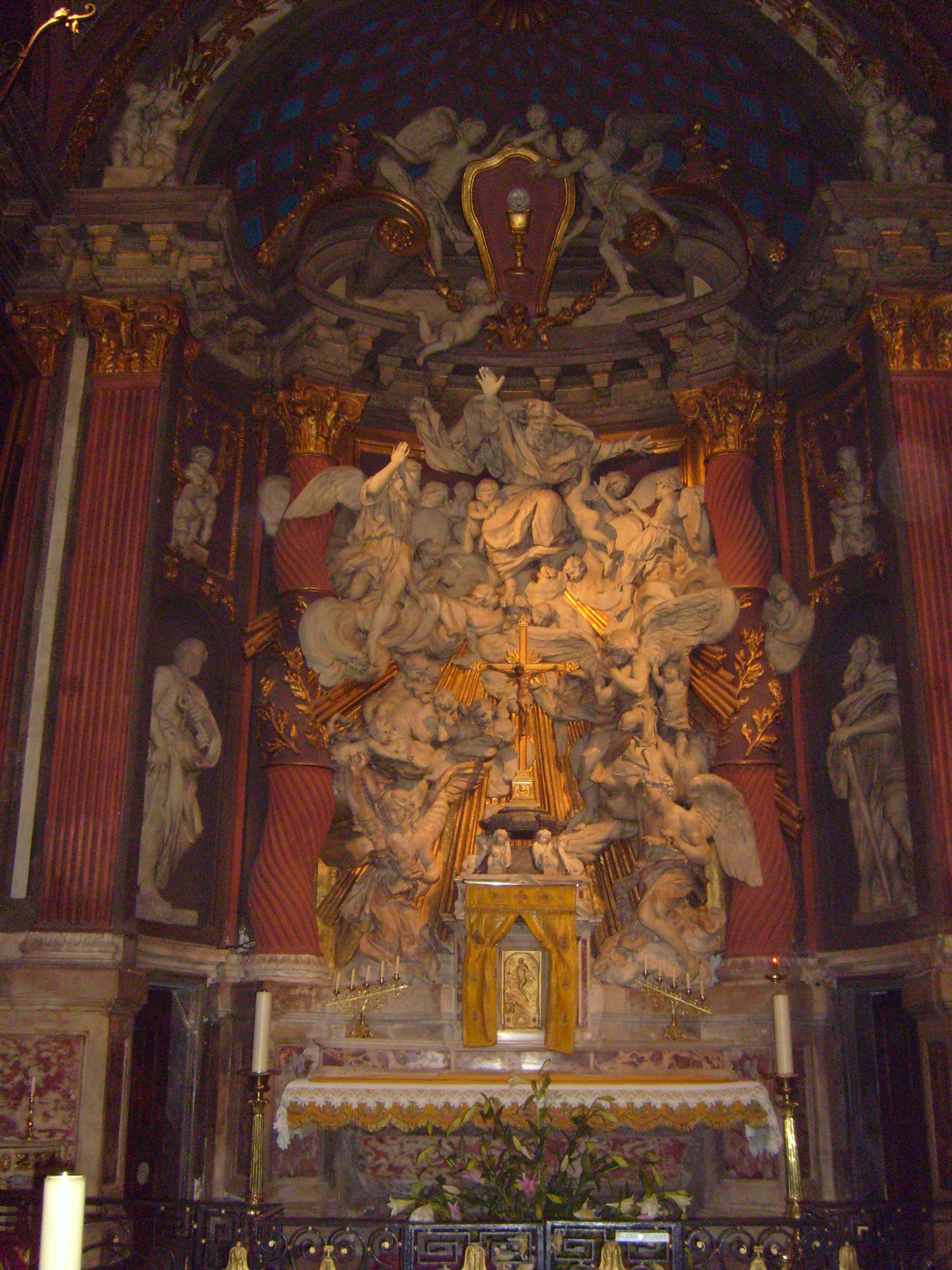
Retable
Toulon Cathedral

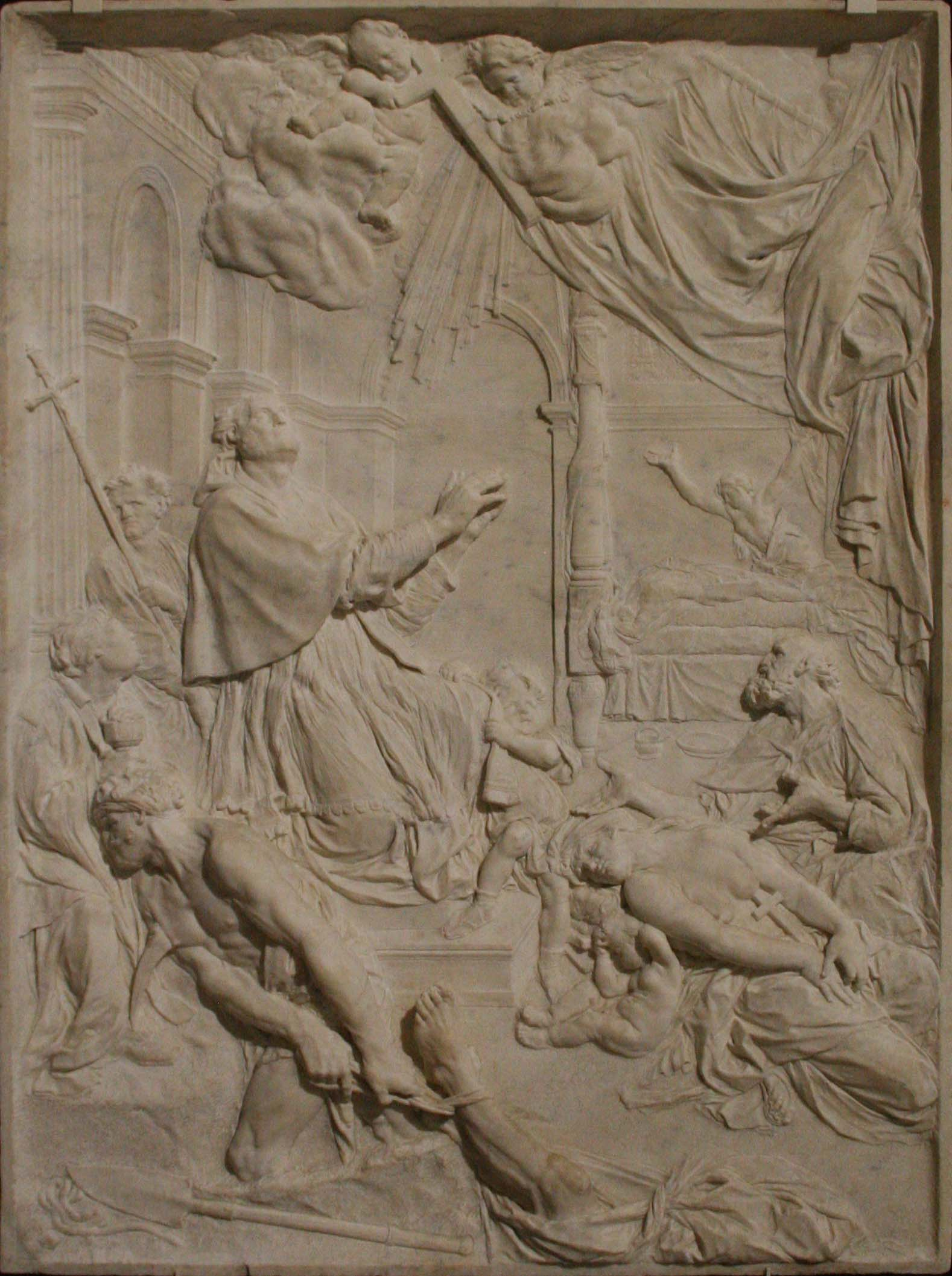
The plague of Milan, (bas-relief) his last and uncompleted work

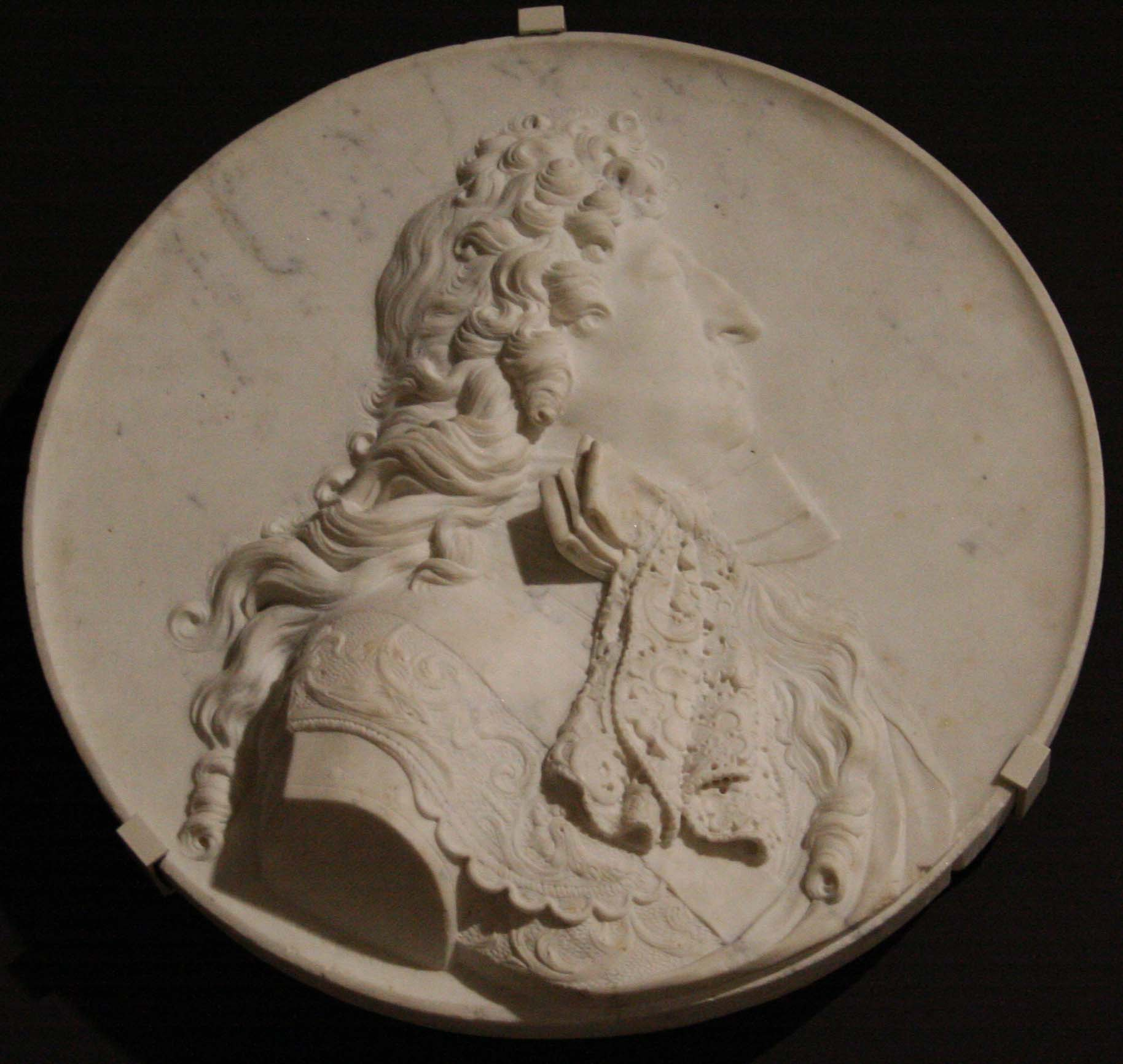
Louis XIV, medallion in marble

== Paintings ==
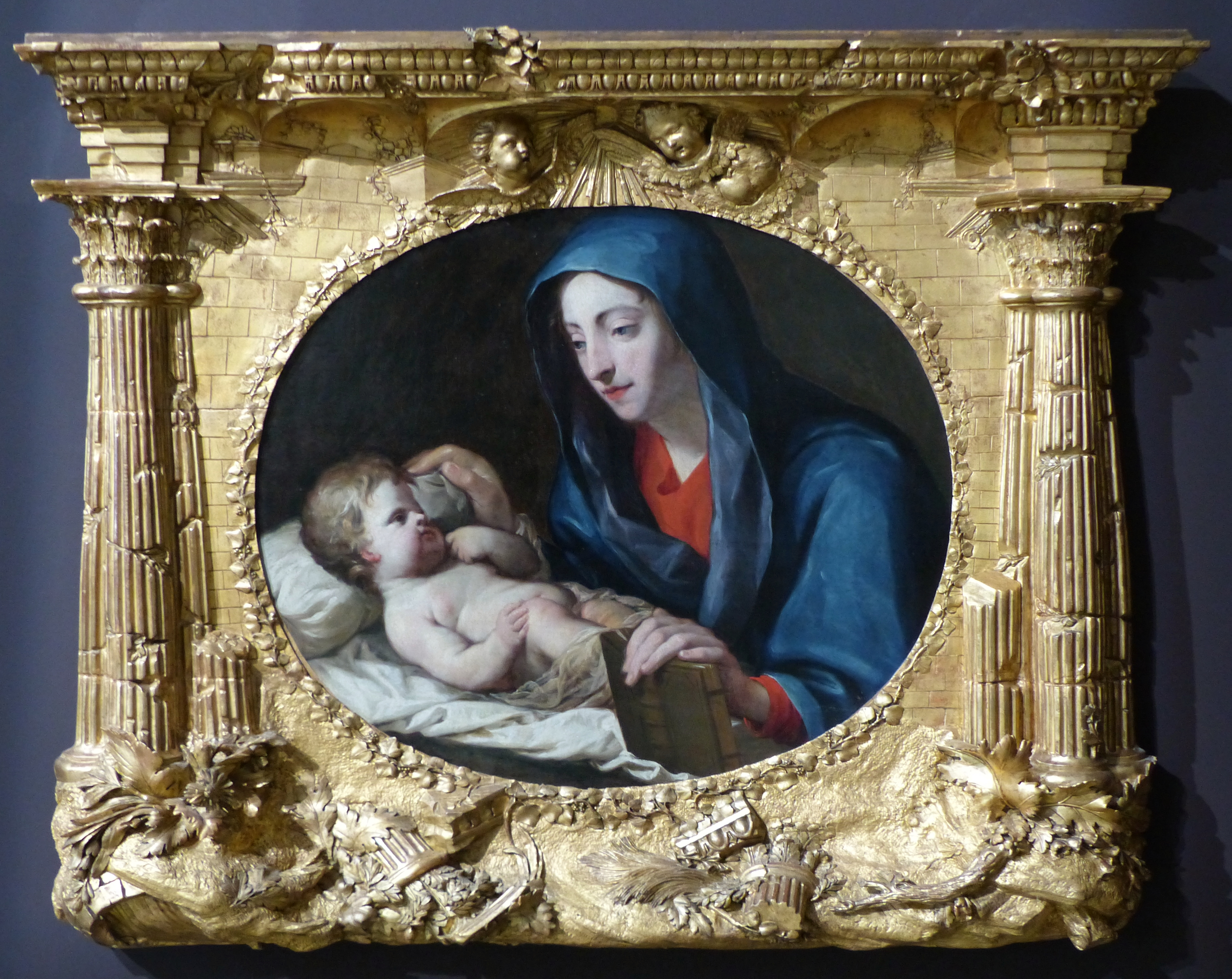
Sleep of the infant Jesus, late 17th century (Museum of Fine Arts, Marseille)

== Bibliography ==
- Lagrange, Léon (1868). Pierre Puget - Peintre - Sculpteur - Décorateur de Vaisseaux (in French). Paris: Didier et Cie. - includes a catalog of his works
- Geese, Uwe (2015). "Section on Baroque sculpture". L'Art Baroque - Architecture - Sculpture - Peinture (in French). Cologne: H.F. Ulmann. ISBN 978-3-8480-0856-8.
- See also Charles Ginoux, Annales de la vie de P. Puget (Paris, 1894); Philippe Auquier, Pierre Puget ... biographie critique (Paris, 1903).
- Herbermann, Charles, ed. (1913). "Pierre Puget" . Catholic Encyclopedia. New York: Robert Appleton Company.

== See also ==
- French sculpture
- Baroque sculpture
