= Adolphe-André Porée =

French archaeologist and historian

Adolphe-André Porée, known as Chanoine Porée (14 March 1848, Bernay – 28 February 1939, Saint-Aubin-d'Écrosville), was a French archaeologist and historian.

Originally from Beaumont-en-Auge, his father, Adolphe Porée, ran a dyeing factory in Bernay. A very religious individual, Porée embraced the priesthood at the age of twenty-three. In 1871, he became the curé of the collegiate church of Les Andelys. In 1875, he became the curé of Bournainville-Faverolles where he remained fifty-three years. Porée spent his nights studying archeology, with particular attention paid to the churches of Eure sold during the First Empire, local notables and the impact of the French Revolution.

Porée, who also was the diocesan archivist, undertook, from 1890 to 1892, an archaeological expedition through France, Belgium, Germany, Switzerland and Italy.

In 1882, he discovered, along with the abbé de La Balle and Gaston Le Breton, a lost statue by Pierre Puget on the old La Londe castle grounds at Biéville-Beuville. This statue of Hercules slaying the Hydra of Lerna, which was originally in the Château du Vaudreuil, is now at the Musée des Beaux-Arts de Rouen.

A disciple of Auguste Le Prévost and Leopold Delisle, he was the director of the Société des Antiquaires de Normandie, a corresponding member of the Académie des Inscriptions et Belles-Lettres and an Officer of Public Instruction. He was awarded the Legion of Honor in 1926.

Porée's Histoire de l'Abbaye du Bec is his magnum opus. Several streets were named after him, in Bec-Hellouin, Bournainville-Faverolles, Pont-Audemer and Bernay. In 1964, a plaque honoring his memory was erected in the cemetery of Bournainville-Faverolles. In 2000, a local former rectory (now the Town Hall) was converted into a Porée museum.

== Selected works ==
- Description du vitrail de Saint-Léger à Notre-Dame d'Andely (in French). Tours: P. Bousrez. 1877.
- Guide historique et descriptif de l'étranger aux Andelys (in French). Les Andelys: Caron. 1879.
- Notice sur la seigneurie et le château du Blanc-Buisson (in French). Caen: F. Le Blanc-Hardel. 1884.
- Guillaume de La Tremblaye, sculpteur et architecte, 1644-1715 (in French). Caen: F. Le Blanc-Hardel. 1884.
- L'Hercule terrassant l'hydre de Lerne de Puget (in French). Bernay: Vve A. Lefèvre. 1884.
- Un peintre bernayen : Michel Hubert-Descours, 1707-1775 (in French). Bernay: J. et A. Lefèvre. 1889.
- Histoire de l'abbaye du Bec (reprint: Bruxelles, Éd. Culture et Civilisation, 1980) (in French). Évreux: Charles Herrissey. 1901.
- Note sur Auguste Le Prévost et Charles Nodier (in French). Rouen: L. Gy. 1903.

== Sources ==
- Bulletin de la Société des antiquaires de Normandie, vol. 46-47, Société des antiquaires de Normandie, Caen, 1939, p. 15 passim.
