= Hôtel de Ville, Toulon =

Town hall in Toulon, France

Hôtel de Ville
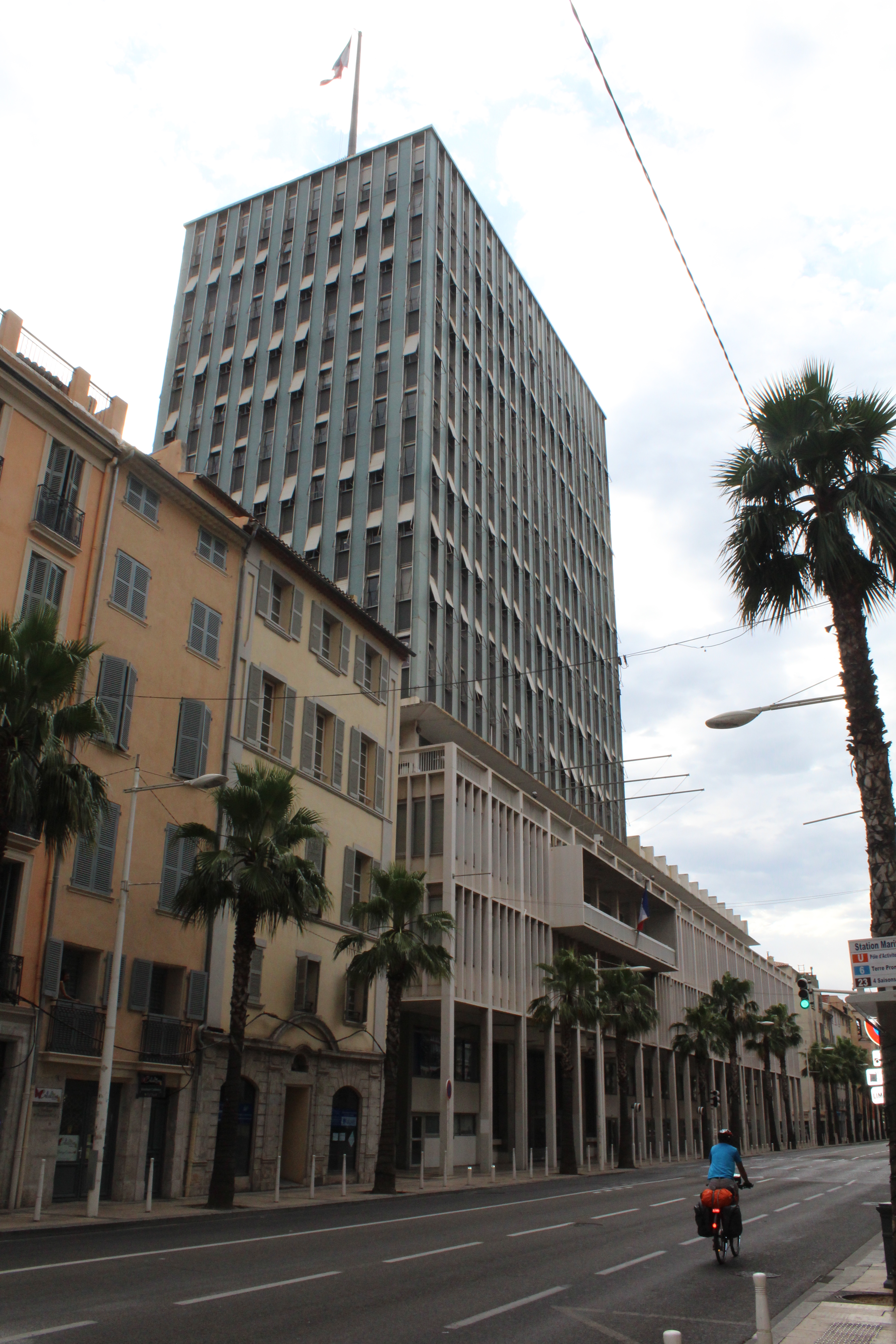
- Main frontage of the Hôtel de Ville in July 2017
- Interactive map of the Hôtel de Ville area

General information
- Type: City hall
- Architectural style: Modern style
- Location: Toulon, France
- Coordinates: 43.1203°N 5.9325°E
- Completed: 1970

Height
- Height: 54 meters (177 ft)

Design and construction
- Architect: Jean de Mailly

The Hôtel de Ville (French pronunciation: [otɛl də vil], City Hall) is a historic building in Toulon, Var, southern France, standing on Avenue de la République.

== History ==
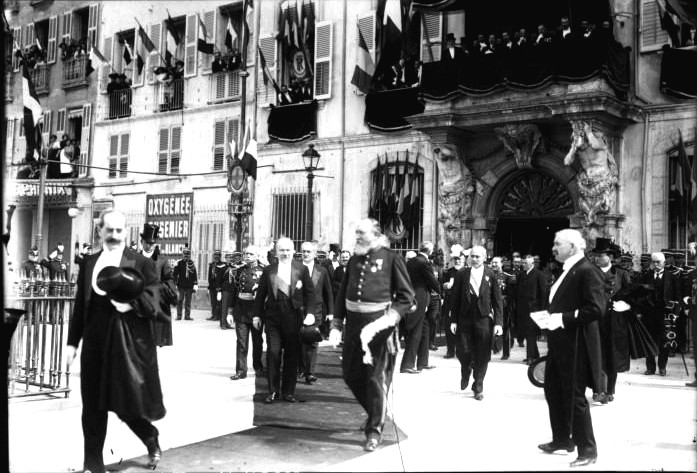
Civic leaders leaving the old Hôtel de Ville

The original town hall was an ancient building on the quayside. In September 1653, the city council decided to demolish the old town hall and erect a new building on the same site.

The new four-storey building was designed in the neoclassical style, built in ashlar stone and was completed in 1656. The design involved a symmetrical main frontage of five bays facing onto the waterfront. The central bay featured an ornate round headed doorway with a keystone, flanked by pilasters, which were adorned by a pair of finely carved figures supporting a balustraded balcony. There was a segmental headed French door, flanked by pilasters supporting a triangular pediment on the first floor. The figures were sculpted by Pierre Puget and, although sometimes referred to as caryatids (female figures), are actually atlanteans (male figures): Puget used two of the porters who unloaded ships along the quay as his models. The doorway was designated a monument historique by the French government in 1914.

The building was also used for public events: on 7 August 1844, the pianist, Franz Liszt, performed a recital there, at a time when Lisztomania was at its height. In 1847, a fine bronze statue designed by the sculptor, Louis-Joseph Daumas, with four bas-reliefs on the base, was unveiled in front of the building. It was officially entitled the Le Génie de la navigation (en: Genius of Navigation). However, it became associated with the French Admiral Jules de Cuverville, who commanded the reserve of the French Mediterranean Fleet in the late 19th century, and local people referred to it, somewhat irreverently, as the "Cul-vers-ville" (en: backside to the town hall). During the Second World War, the atlanteans and balcony were removed and stored at Thoronet Abbey.

In the early 1950s, the city council decided to commission a more substantial building. The site they selected was on the Avenue de la République on the opposite side of the road to the rear of the old building. The original proposal was to erect a 25-storey mixed-use municipal development, which would have been connected to the old building by a footbridge across the road. However, this plan was rejected based on its high cost and it being too avant-garde. The new building was designed Jean de Mailly in the modern style, built with a concrete core and steel frame and was completed in January 1970.

The design involved a symmetrical main frontage facing onto Avenue de la République. The structure consisted of a 15-storey tower sitting on a three-storey podium. The front of the podium featured a large portico extending the full width of the building. The tower was 54 meters (177 ft) high, or 70 meters (230 ft) high including the flagpole, and featured alternating columns of windows and blue-tinted cladding. Internally, the podium accommodated the offices of the mayor and deputy mayors as well as the public facing areas, while the tower accommodated the council staff.

Meanwhile, the site of the 17th century town hall on the quay was redeveloped, and the new building on the quay was designated the Mairie d'honneur. The old doorway was retained to provide access to the new building which now serves as a tourist centre.
