= Vieille Charité =

Former almshouse in Marseille, France

Coordinates: 43°18′01″N 5°22′04″E

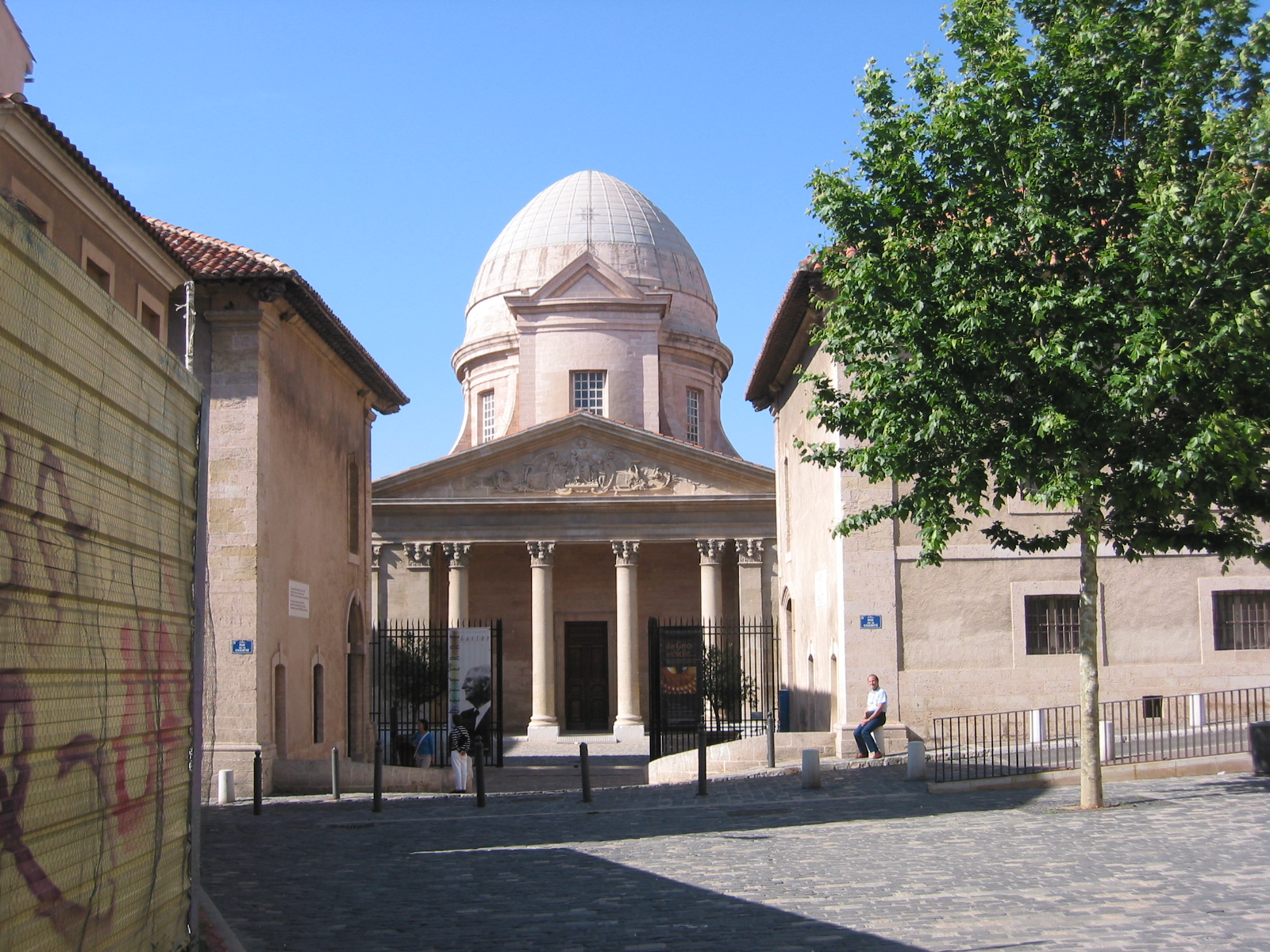
Puget's chapel guards the entrance to La Vieille Charité, Marseille

La Vieille Charité (French pronunciation: [la vjɛj ʃaʁite]; lit. 'The Old Charity'; Occitan: La Vieja Caritat) is a former almshouse, now functioning as a museum and cultural centre, situated in the heart of the old Panier quarter of Marseille in the south of France. Constructed between 1671, and 1749, in the Baroque style to the designs of the architect Pierre Puget, it comprises four ranges of arcaded galleries in three storeys surrounding a space with a central chapel surmounted by an ovoid dome.

The chapel and the hospice were classified as a historic monument by order of January 29, 1951.

== Construction ==
The idea of an almshouse for the poor, dedicated to Notre-Dame, mère de Charité (Our Lady, Mother of Charity), was originally conceived in 1622; but it was not until 1640, that a suitable plot of land was acquired, with the first pensioners admitted in the following year. Although the foundation stone was laid in that year, construction commenced only in 1671, following a grand plan of the architect Pierre Puget. It was not completed until 1749, construction being prolonged as the result of reductions to the project imposed by the aldermen of Marseille. The central chapel was erected between 1679, and 1704. Although Puget died in 1694, that part of the project was completed under the direction of his son, François.

== Architecture ==
The main body of the structure is a rectangle, 112 m by 96 m, composed of four walls in pink and yellow-tinted molasse stone from the ancient quarries at Cap Couronne, with no outward facing windows. On the inside are three arcaded galleries superposed on each other, opening onto an interior courtyard measuring 82 m by 45 m. In the centre of the courtyard is a harmonious chapel, a round church, crowned by an ellipsoidal dome and fronted by a portico in the classical style with Corinthian columns. This Baroque chapel ranks as one of Puget's most original designs.

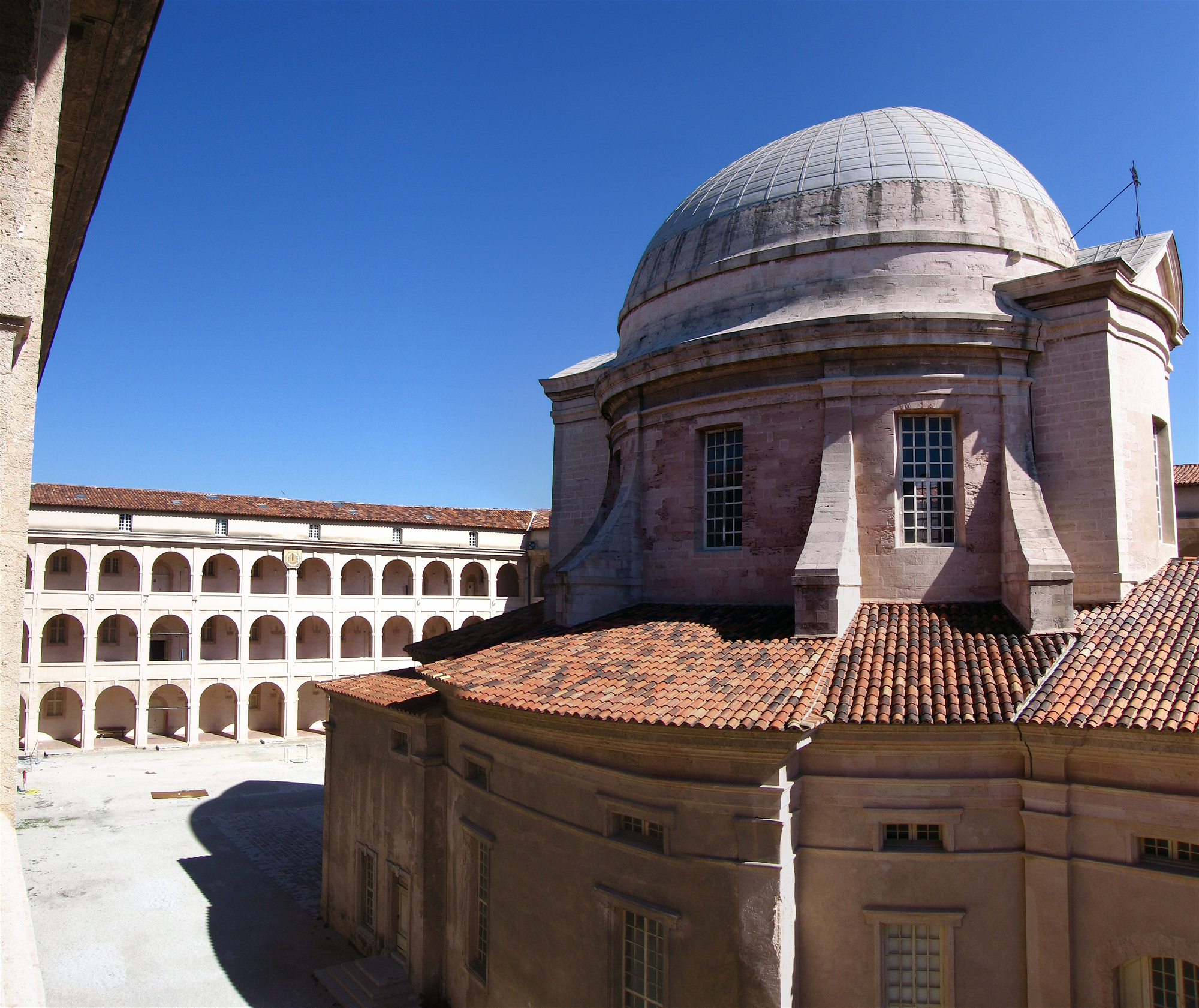
The chapel of la Vieille Charité

== Historic use ==
In the seventeenth century the repression of beggars was conducted with great brutality in France. Guards called Chasse-gueux ("beggar-hunters") had the task of rounding up beggars: non-residents among them were expelled from Marseille, and natives of Marseille were shut up in prison. Often the crowd would take the side of the beggars during such arrests.

The almshouses served as workhouses for the beggars. Children were found jobs as domestic servants, cabin boys or apprentices with seamstresses or bakers. As time passed the work of la Vielle Charité grew, the number of inmates increasing from 850 in 1736 to 1059, in 1760. As the imprisonment of the poor became less acceptable, the numbers decreased to 250 in 1781.

Spared during the French Revolution, the building was used as an asylum for "les vagabonds et les gens sans aveu" (vagrants and the dispossessed) in the nineteenth century. It was transformed into a barracks for the French Foreign Legion until 1922, when it was used to lodge those displaced by the demolition of the district behind the Bourse and later those made homeless by the dynamiting of the Old Port during the Second World War. Plagued by squatters, pillagers and vandals, it eventually housed 146 families living in squalid and unsafe conditions, a group of around 30 Little Sisters of Jesus living in equally abject conditions to their charges, and various small concerns, devoted amongst other things to transport, packing of anchovies and ripening of bananas. In 1962, all the residents were rehoused and the building shut down. It was only in 1968, thanks to the intervention of the Minister of Culture André Malraux, that funds became available to rescue the buildings, by then in a state of total dereliction. La Vieille Charité was painstakingly restored to its former glory between 1970, and 1986, restoration of the chapel being completed in 1981.

== Current use ==
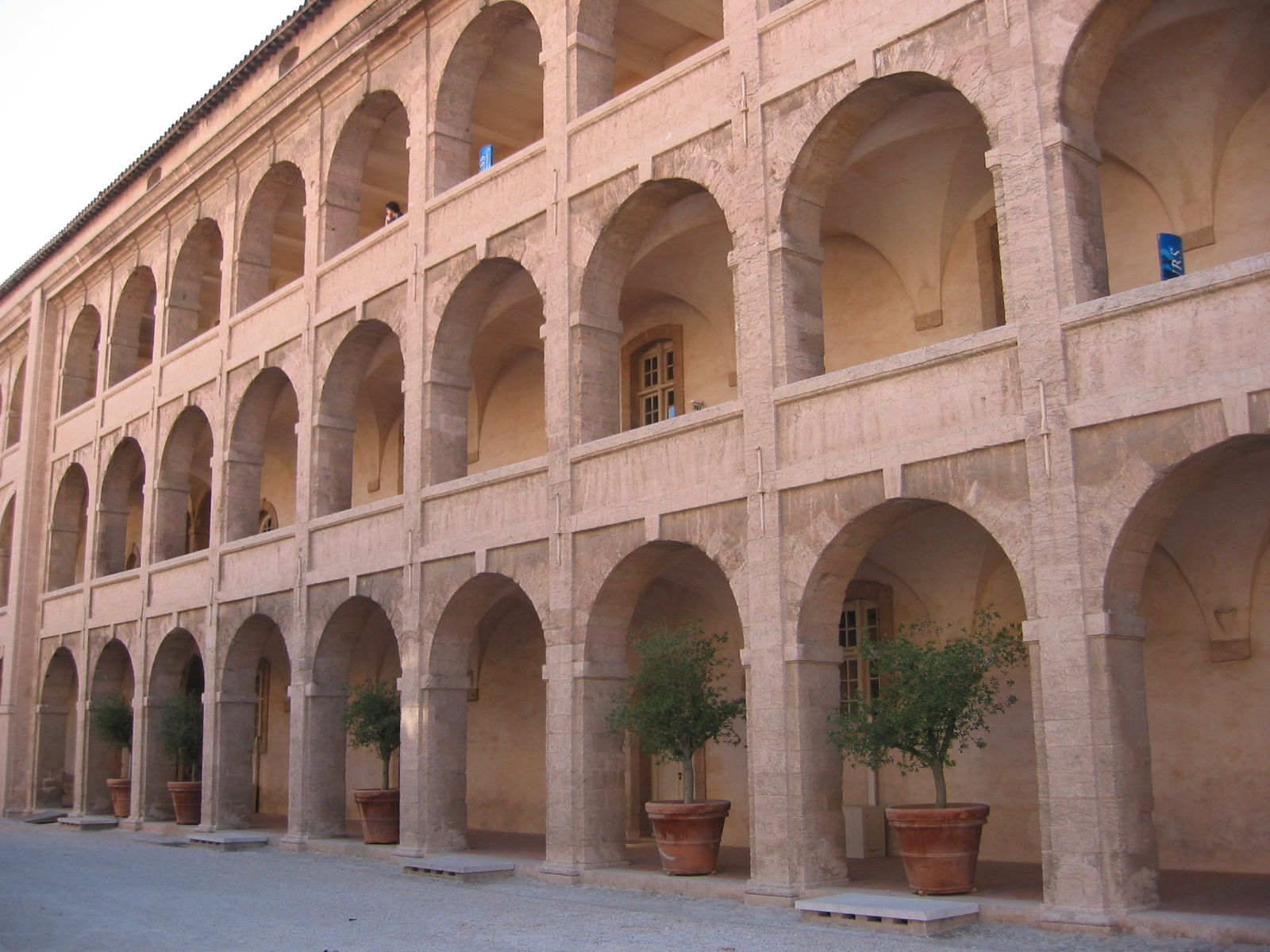
The interior courtyard of la Vieille Charité

La Vieille Charité houses a number of different cultural and educational resources:

- The Museum of Mediterranean Archaeology, on the first floor, covering oriental and classical antiquities, as well as local Celto-Ligurian archaeology.
- The Museum of Art of Africa, Oceania and Amerindia, on the second floor, containing an unusually collection of artefacts, including masks from Mexico and West Africa and a unique collection of engraved human skulls and trophy heads from South America.
- A regional hub of the École des Hautes Études en sciences sociales (EHESS), providing academic training (a master and a PhD curriculum).
- The Centre Norbert Elias, a research centre in anthropology, sociology and history of social dynamics.
- The Fabrique des écritures, an innovative project offering production facilities to researchers, as well as an environment to develop a critical thinking on creative and emerging forms of narrative.
- A research library specialised in social sciences and anthropology, in particular visual anthropology.
- The Centre international de la poésie de Marseille, dedicated to the creation and dissemination of contemporary poetry.
- Temporary exhibition rooms and a café.
