= Bournainville-Faverolles =

- Commune
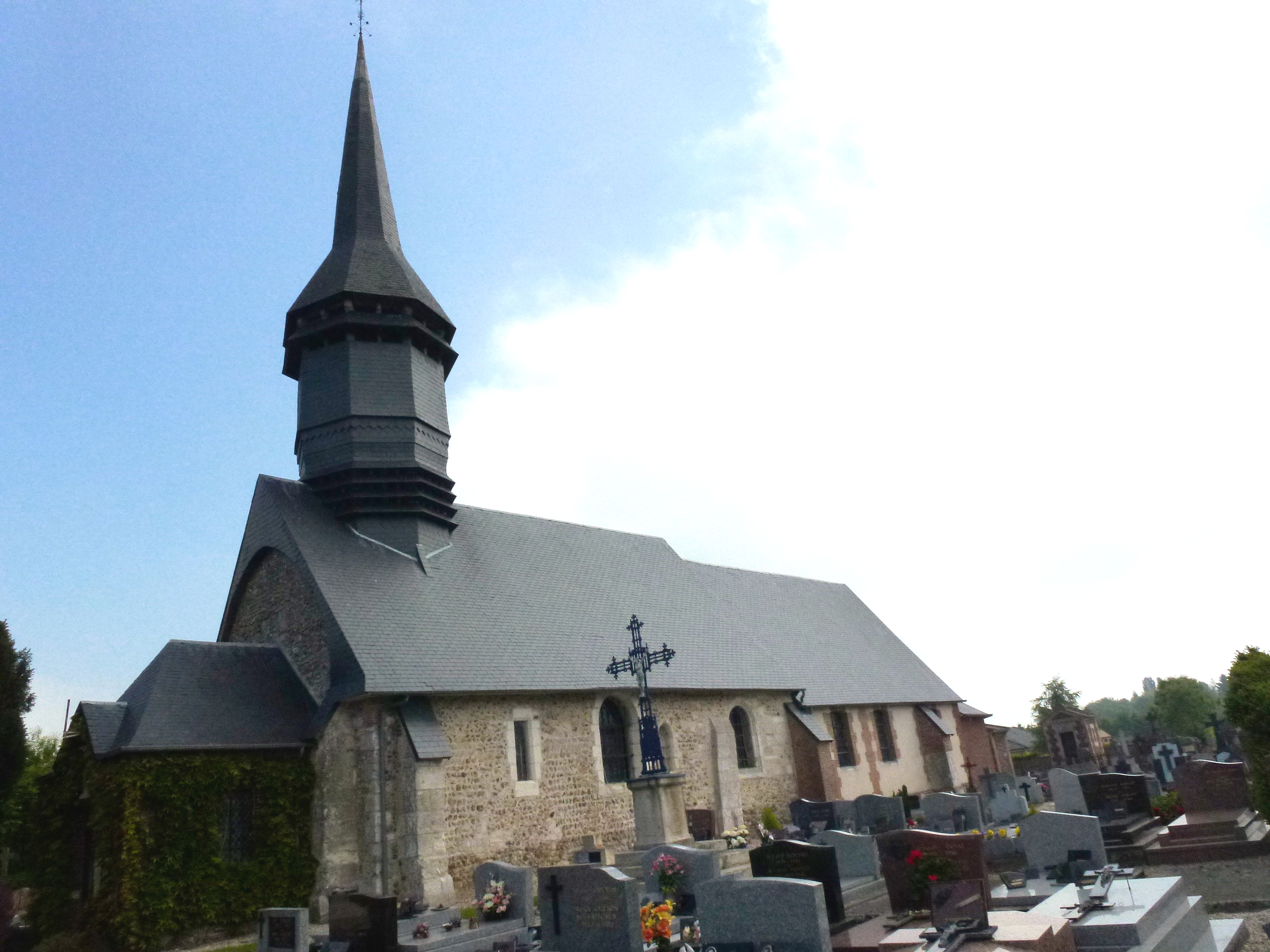
- The church in Bournainville-Faverolles

- Coat of arms
- Location of Bournainville-Faverolles
- Location within France Location within Normandy
- Coordinates: 49°07′40″N 0°29′20″E
- Country: France
- Region: Normandy
- Department: Eure
- Arrondissement: Bernay
- Canton: Beuzeville
- Intercommunality: Lieuvin Pays d'Auge

Government
  - Mayor (2020–2026): Jean-Claude Toutain
- Area^{1}: 6.96 km^{2} (2.69 sq mi)
- Elevation: 185 m (607 ft)
- Highest elevation: 185 m (607 ft)
- Lowest elevation: 169 m (554 ft)
- Population (2023): 481
  - Density: 69.1/km^{2} (179/sq mi)
- Time zone: UTC+01:00 (CET)
  - Summer (DST): UTC+02:00 (CEST)
- INSEE/Postal code: 27106 /27230
- ^{1} French Land Register data, which excludes lakes, ponds, glaciers > 1 km^{2} (0.386 sq mi or 247 acres) and river estuaries.

Bournainville-Faverolles (French pronunciation: [buʁnɛ̃vil favʁɔl]) is a commune in the Eure department in Normandy in northern France. The "Chanoine Porée" Museum is set up in the Town Hall.

== Population ==
Historical population
Year	Pop.	±% p.a.
1968	203	—
1975	280	+4.70%
1982	380	+4.46%
1990	441	+1.88%
1999	425	−0.41%
2007	367	−1.82%
2012	429	+3.17%
2017	483	+2.40%
2023	481	−0.07%
Source: INSEE

== See also ==
- Communes of the Eure department
