= François Puget =

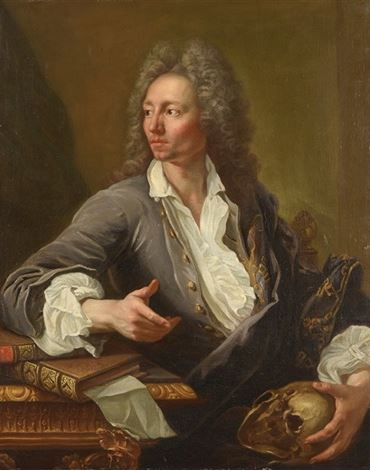
Gentleman Meditating Upon a Skull

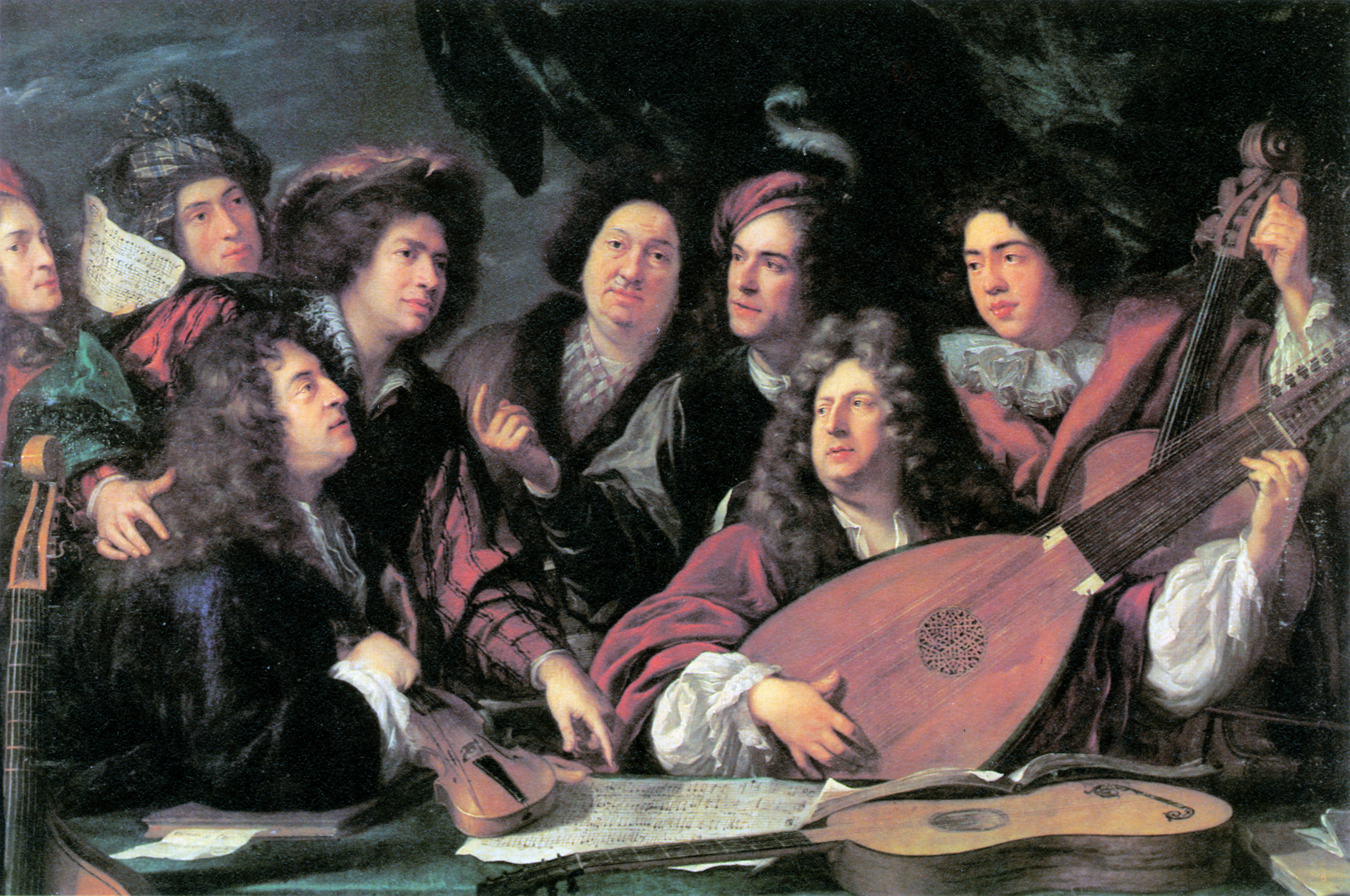
A Meeting of Musicians

François Puget (17 December 1651 – 6 October 1707) was a French painter in the Baroque style, known primarily for his portraits.

== Biography ==
He was born in Toulon. His father was the architect, sculptor and painter Pierre Puget. After a scandal involving the Finance Minister Nicolas Fouquet, in 1661, his father decided to stay in Genoa, where he had been working. Two years later, he and his mother Paule followed, and that is where he grew up. The author, Joseph Bougerel (1680-1753), believed that he was briefly a student of Giovanni Benedetto Castiglione, but this has been recently questioned by Marie-Christine Gloton of the Académie Française. In 1668, the family returned to Toulon and his father became the manager of the sculpture workshop at the Arsenal. He married Jeanne Jourdanis in 1677 and they had three children together.

In 1679, it appears that he followed his father to Marseille, as in 1680 he is known to have created a painting for the convent of the Order of the Visitation of Holy Mary, depicting that event. At the same time, he painted his "Portrait of a Seated Man". Both works are now at the Musée des beaux-arts de Marseille. He then decided to stay there to assist his aging father. Between 1683 and 1688, he visited Paris three times to present his father's works to King Louis XIV at Versailles.

He became a widower in 1691, but soon remarried; to Geneviève Mazerat, the daughter of a former Échevin (a type of Magistrate) and a relative of his father's second wife. That same year he became "Peintre Ordinaire du Roi". He seems also to have become the official artist for the city of Marseille, as he created portraits of numerous city office holders from 1697 to 1706.

He also had some talents as an architect. After his father's death in 1694, he assumed responsibility for completing the chapel of La Vieille Charité; especially the cupola of the dome.

Other notable works include the "Meeting of Musicians", which was a gift to Louis XIV. It was long believed to be a portrayal of Jean-Baptiste Lully and Philippe Quinault, but the musicians pictured were actually friends of the Puget family. He also did at least one, and possibly two portraits of his father, c.1692. All of these are in the Louvre. Several works that were originally attributed to his father have since been identified as his.

Puget died in 1707, in Marseille.
