= Pont-de-Crau =

Coordinates: 43°39′54″N 4°38′51″E

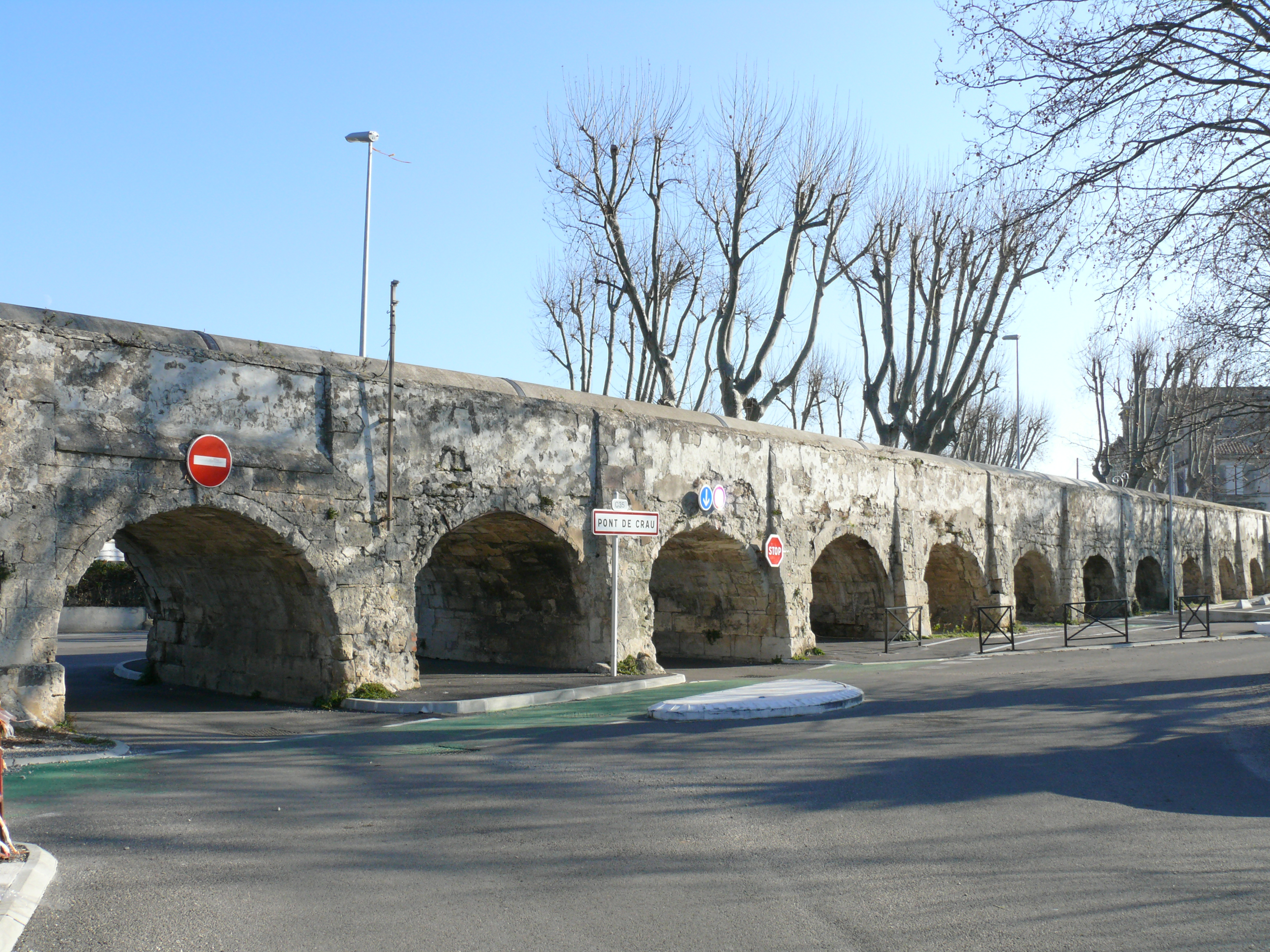
Pont de Crau aqueduct

Location of Pont-de-Crau in Provence-Alpes-Côte d'Azur

Pont-de-Crau is a village of 3,200 inhabitants within the municipality of Arles, in the Bouches-du-Rhône department, France. It is named after the bridge/aqueduct that was built circa 1585 to carry the Canal de Craponne across the fetid swamps south east of the city.

== History ==
In 1554 Adam de Craponne began an irrigation project, building the Canal de Craponne from the river Durance to Salon-de-Provence. In 1581 the Ravel brothers began to extend the canal to Arles, traversing the arid plain of Crau. The project was sanctioned by Robert de Montcalm, councillor of king Henry III of France and president of his court at the Parlement of Aix-en-Provence. De Montcalm used his own money to purchase a two-ninths share of the Arles-Canal de Craponne project, which was confirmed by an act of August 29, 1583.

In 1584, the associates built the Pont-de-Crau, a bridge and aqueduct to cross a fetid foul water swamp south east of Arles. This was significant cost and was commenced on 22 August 1585. Two consuls of Arles had opposed the project and energised a following among the local population, so De Montcalm summoned them to appear before the Parliament of Aix in November 1585, but he died on 20 October 1585, before the hearing.

== Administration and services ==
The public services and amenities of Pont de Crau include two schools and a stadium. The students of the hamlet begin their studies at the kindergarten La Claire-Fontaine, a subsidiary of the Academy of Aix-Marseille. It has 129 children.

== Economic activity ==
Shops include a pharmacy, a bakery, a tobacconist, coffee shop, grocery store, three hair salons, a pizzeria, a caterer, and a beautician.
