= Hôtel de Ville, Salon-de-Provence =

Town hall in Salon-de-Provence, France

Hôtel de Ville
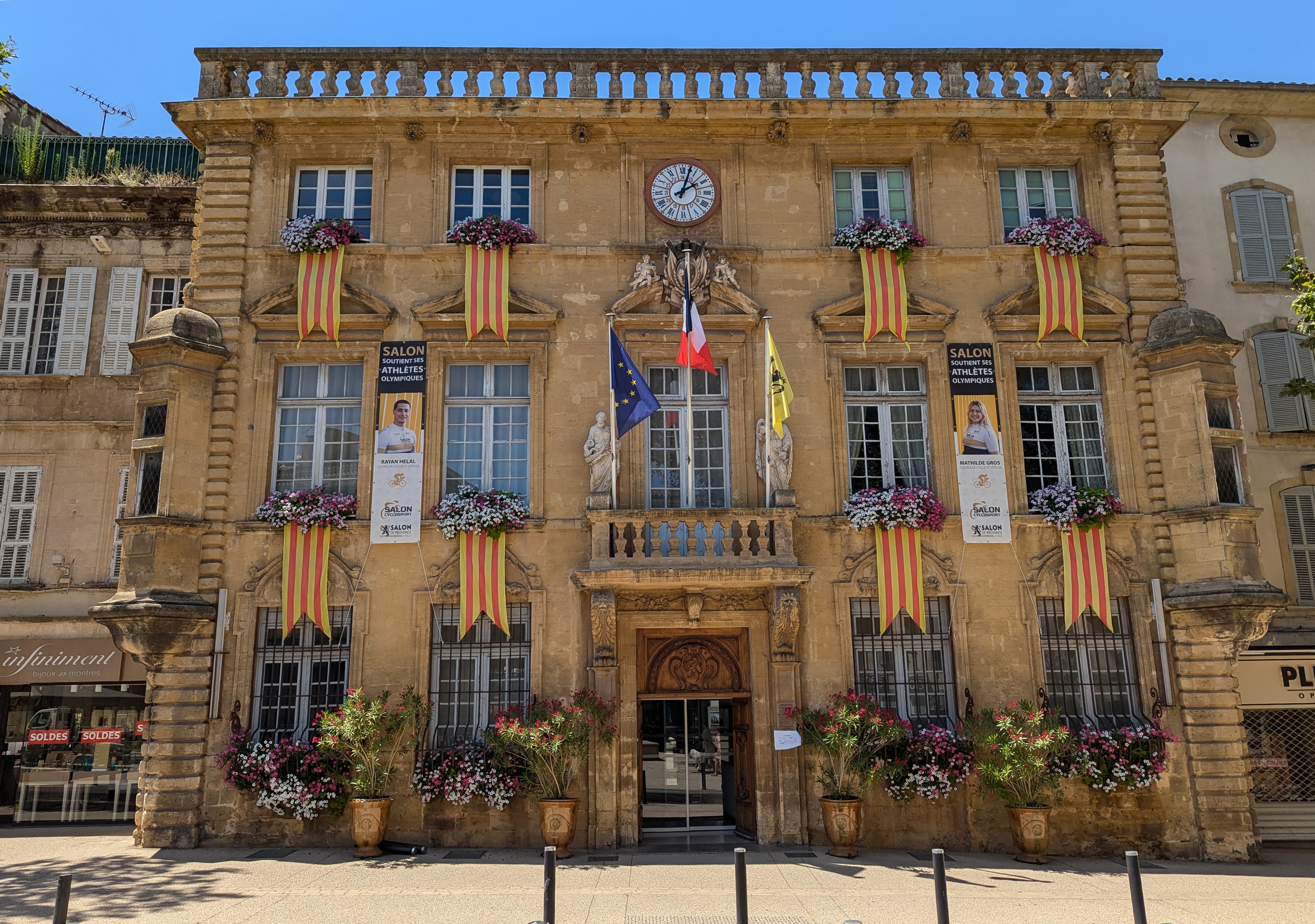
- The main frontage of the Hôtel de Ville in July 2024
- Interactive map of the Hôtel de Ville area

General information
- Type: City hall
- Architectural style: Neoclassical style
- Location: Salon-de-Provence, France
- Coordinates: 43.6407°N 5.0989°E
- Completed: 1658

The Hôtel de Ville (French pronunciation: [otɛl də vil], City Hall) is a municipal building in Salon-de-Provence, Bouches-du-Rhône, in southern France, standing on Place de l'Hôtel de Ville.

== History ==
In the Middle Ages, the consuls met in the Church of Saint-Michel or the Maison Commune, which was on Place de l'Ormeau but, in the early 17th century, they relocated to a building near the Bourg Neuf Gate.

In the mid-17th century, the consuls decided to erect a purpose-built extension. The foundation stone was laid by the first consul, Pol de Grignan, on 19 April 1955. The building was designed in the neoclassical style, built in yellow stone from a local quarry and was completed in 1658.

The design involved a symmetrical main frontage of five bays facing onto Place de l'Hôtel de Ville. The central bay featured a square headed doorway with an ornate carving above and a stone surround. The doorway was flanked by brackets supporting a cornice and a balustraded balcony, the corners of which were surmounted by statues of female figures representing prudence and temperance. There was a French door with an open segmental pediment on the first floor, and a clock on the second floor. The other bays were fenestrated by casement windows with round headed pediments on the ground floor, casement windows with triangular or segmental pediments on the first floor, and plain casement windows on the second floor. At roof level, there was a cornice and a balustraded parapet. There were quoins at the corners and bartizans on the first floor. Internally, the principal rooms were the Salle de Rostaing de la Capre, which was named after a former Archbishop of Arles, and the Salle du Conseil (council chamber), which is now used as the Salle des Mariages (wedding room).

During the French Revolution, the coat of arms of the kings of France, which had decorated the pediment above the French door on the first floor, was removed and replaced by a stone which was initially inscribed with the words "La Loi" (the law). It was later replaced by a depiction of a leopard, which features in the coat of arms of the town. A statue depicting the 16th century engineer, Adam de Craponne, who had designed the Craponne Canal, was unveiled in front of the town hall on 22 October 1854. The parapet was damaged during the 1909 Provence earthquake and subsequently replaced.

After the Second World War, a plaque was fixed to the north elevation of the town hall to commemorate the life of Captain Marcel Roustan, who was the local commanding officer of the French Forces of the Interior and who was arrested by the Gestapo, tortured and shot in June 1944. This was only two months before the liberation of the town during Operation Dragoon in August 1944.

In the late 1970s and early 1980s, adjoining buildings were acquired to allow expansion, resulting in a sprawling complex with quite complicated internal arrangements. A new council chamber with modern fittings and furniture was established on the second floor. Since August 2016, the council has supported an annual concert of electronic dance music, known as "Du son au balcon" (Sound from the balcony), which has been broadcast from the balcony of the building.
