= Canton of Salon-de-Provence-2 =

Coordinates: 43.64°N 5.09°E

- Canton
- Situation of the canton of Salon-de-Provence-2 in the department of Bouches-du-Rhône
- Country: France
- Region: Provence-Alpes-Côte d'Azur
- Department: Bouches-du-Rhône
- No. of communes: {{{nbcomm}}}
- Population (2023): 71,596
- INSEE code: 1327

The canton of Salon-de-Provence-2 is an administrative division of the Bouches-du-Rhône department, in southeastern France. It was created at the French canton reorganisation which came into effect in March 2015. Its seat is in Salon-de-Provence.

It consists of the following communes:

1. Grans
2. Miramas
3. Saint-Martin-de-Crau
4. Salon-de-Provence (partly)
