= Miquèu Tronc =

Writer

Miquèu Tronc (in French language Michel Tronc) was a 16th-century Occitan language writer from Provence. He was born in Salon-de-Provence and is the author of Las Humours à la lourguino.

According to Occitan critic and writer Robèrt Lafont, he may have led a team of Occitan poets called La Manada who may have challenged Louis Bellaud's team (Los Arqins).
