= Grans =

Commune in Provence-Alpes-Côte d'Azur, France

- Commune
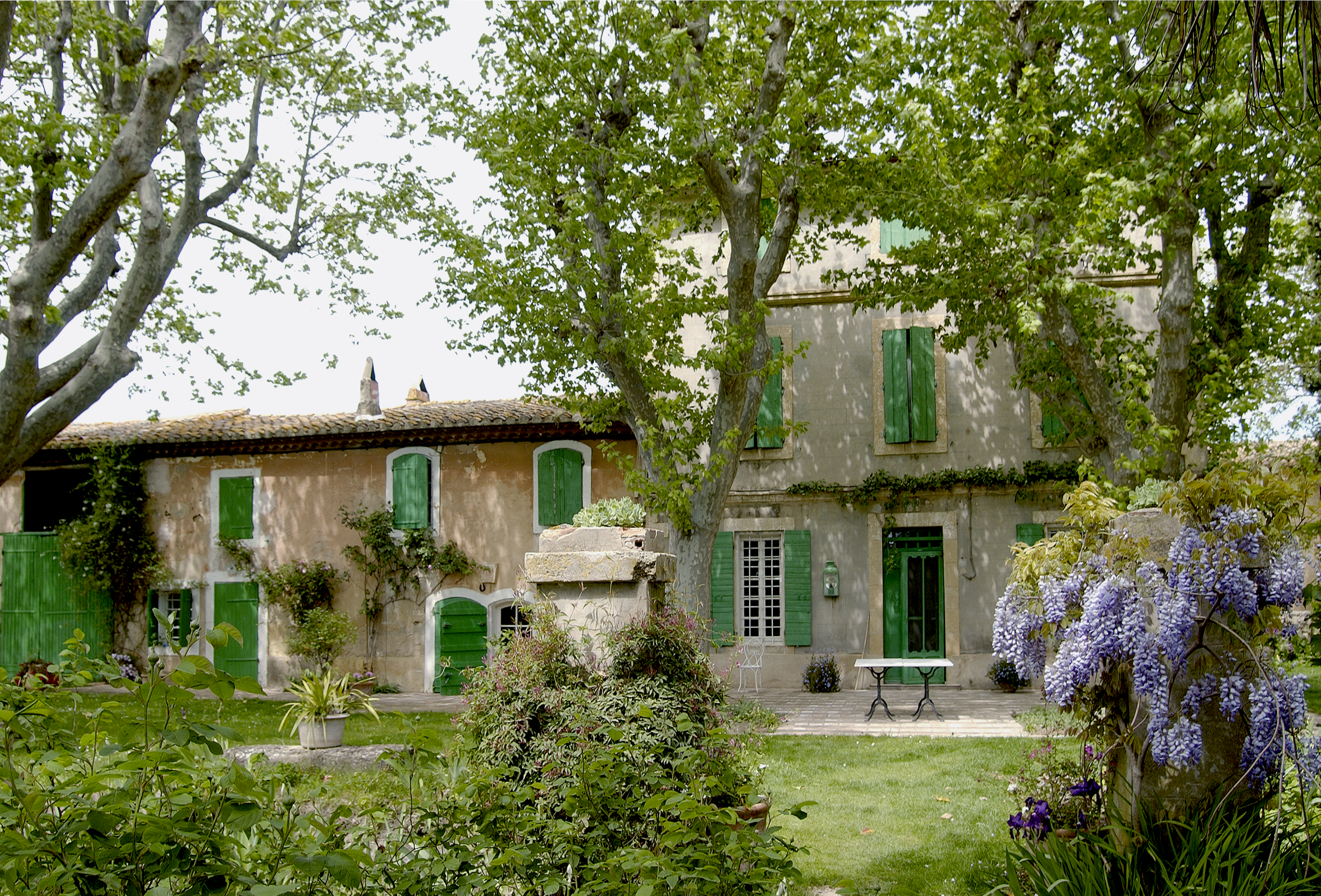
- Mas du Bayle-Vert in Grans

- Coat of arms
- Location of Grans
- Location within France Location within Provence-Alpes-Côte d'Azur
- Coordinates: 43°36′34″N 5°03′49″E
- Country: France
- Region: Provence-Alpes-Côte d'Azur
- Department: Bouches-du-Rhône
- Arrondissement: Istres
- Canton: Salon-de-Provence-2
- Intercommunality: Aix-Marseille-Provence

Government
  - Mayor (2026–32): Philippe Leandri
- Area^{1}: 27.6 km^{2} (10.7 sq mi)
- Elevation: 49 m (161 ft)
- Highest elevation: 110 m (360 ft)
- Lowest elevation: 38 m (125 ft)
- Population (2023): 5,489
  - Density: 199/km^{2} (515/sq mi)
- Time zone: UTC+01:00 (CET)
  - Summer (DST): UTC+02:00 (CEST)
- INSEE/Postal code: 13044 /13450
- ^{1} French Land Register data, which excludes lakes, ponds, glaciers > 1 km^{2} (0.386 sq mi or 247 acres) and river estuaries.

Grans (French pronunciation: [ɡʁɑ̃s]) is a commune in the Bouches-du-Rhône department in the Provence-Alpes-Côte d'Azur region in Southern France.

== Population ==
Historical population

Year	Pop.	±% p.a.
1793	1,738	—
1800	1,583	−1.33%
1806	1,588	+0.05%
1821	1,844	+1.00%
1831	1,634	−1.20%
1836	1,779	+1.71%
1841	1,681	−1.13%
1846	1,697	+0.19%
1851	1,740	+0.50%
1856	1,967	+2.48%
1861	1,968	+0.01%
1866	1,994	+0.26%
1872	1,920	−0.63%
1876	1,937	+0.22%
1881	1,794	−1.52%
1886	1,807	+0.14%
1891	1,706	−1.14%
1896	1,779	+0.84%
1901	1,740	−0.44%

Year	Pop.	±% p.a.
1906	1,774	+0.39%
1911	1,847	+0.81%
1921	1,589	−1.49%
1926	1,577	−0.15%
1931	1,588	+0.14%
1936	1,620	+0.40%
1946	1,718	+0.59%
1954	1,985	+1.82%
1962	2,216	+1.39%
1968	2,446	+1.66%
1975	2,801	+1.95%
1982	3,095	+1.44%
1990	3,436	+1.32%
1999	3,716	+0.87%
2007	4,078	+1.17%
2012	4,319	+1.15%
2017	5,118	+3.45%
2023	5,489	+1.17%

Source: EHESS and INSEE (1968-2023)

== See also ==
- Communes of the Bouches-du-Rhône department
