= Abba Mari ben Eligdor =

Abba Mari ben Eligdor (also called Sen (or Senior) Astruc de Noves) was a distinguished Talmudist, an eminent philosopher, a member of the Astruc family and an able physicist and astronomer who flourished in the fourteenth century in Salon-de-Provence. In 1335, he was already very old (Samuel of Marseilles, in "Écrivains Juifs," p. 562, according to which the note in "Rev. Ét. Juives," ix. 59, must be corrected).

Of the many writings of Abba Mari, who, according to his contemporary, Isaac de Lattes, wrote commentaries on the Pentateuch, Job, parts of the Talmud, and Pirḳe de-Rabbi Eliezer, as well as works on physics, logic, and metaphysics, merely fragments are extant, and these in manuscript only. His commentary on Job is found in several European libraries; it is not a commentary in an exegetical or historical sense, but is full of philosophical disquisitions upon the Biblical theodicy.

The existence of Job is doubted by Abba Mari, as by some of the Talmudic rabbis. He says that, at any rate, the book bearing his name was not written by Job, as some authorities in the Talmud admit, but by Moses. Job's four friends represent in their personalities four different views of evil in the world. Eliphaz, representative of tradition, denies altogether the reality of evil, in agreement with Deut. xxxii. 4. Bildad, on the other hand, does not deny its reality, but holds, as-if he had been the loyal disciple of the old rabbis and Motazilites, that God allows the just to suffer here in order to reward them the more in the future life. Zophar, too, considers evil a reality; with the Ascharites, with whom many rabbis agree, he insists on man's ignorance of the divine will, which finite man ought not to investigate. Elihu is of the same opinion as Eliphaz, but with the difference that what Eliphaz accepts as a matter of faith, Elihu demonstrates philosophically. It can thus be seen that Abba Mari was a loyal student of Maimonides, and that, like him, he considered revelation and true philosophy as identical. Whether a philosophical and allegorical commentary on the Song of Songs, in manuscript in the Cambridge and Oxford libraries and ascribed to him, is really his, or should be credited to Moses of Narbonne, with whom Abba Mari is elsewhere confounded, is uncertain. The same doubt holds concerning the Hebrew translation of Gazzali's "Tendencies of Philosophers," which is ascribed to Abba Mari, but possibly also belongs to the aforesaid Moses. But there is no reason for Steinschneider's doubt concerning a Munich manuscript, containing the introduction to the first book of Euclid, with the superscription, "Written by Abba Mari, philosopher and teacher of truth."; it certainly belongs to our Abba Mari, and the words Abba Mari are not to be translated "My Lord and Father," for these two words would otherwise have their proper place at the beginning and not at the end of the sentence. Abba Mari also wrote "Refutations," in which he assailed Joseph Caspi's "Book of Secrets." This book, with the exception of a few quotations from it in other writers, has disappeared.
