= Miramas =

Commune in Provence-Alpes-Côte d'Azur, France

- Commune
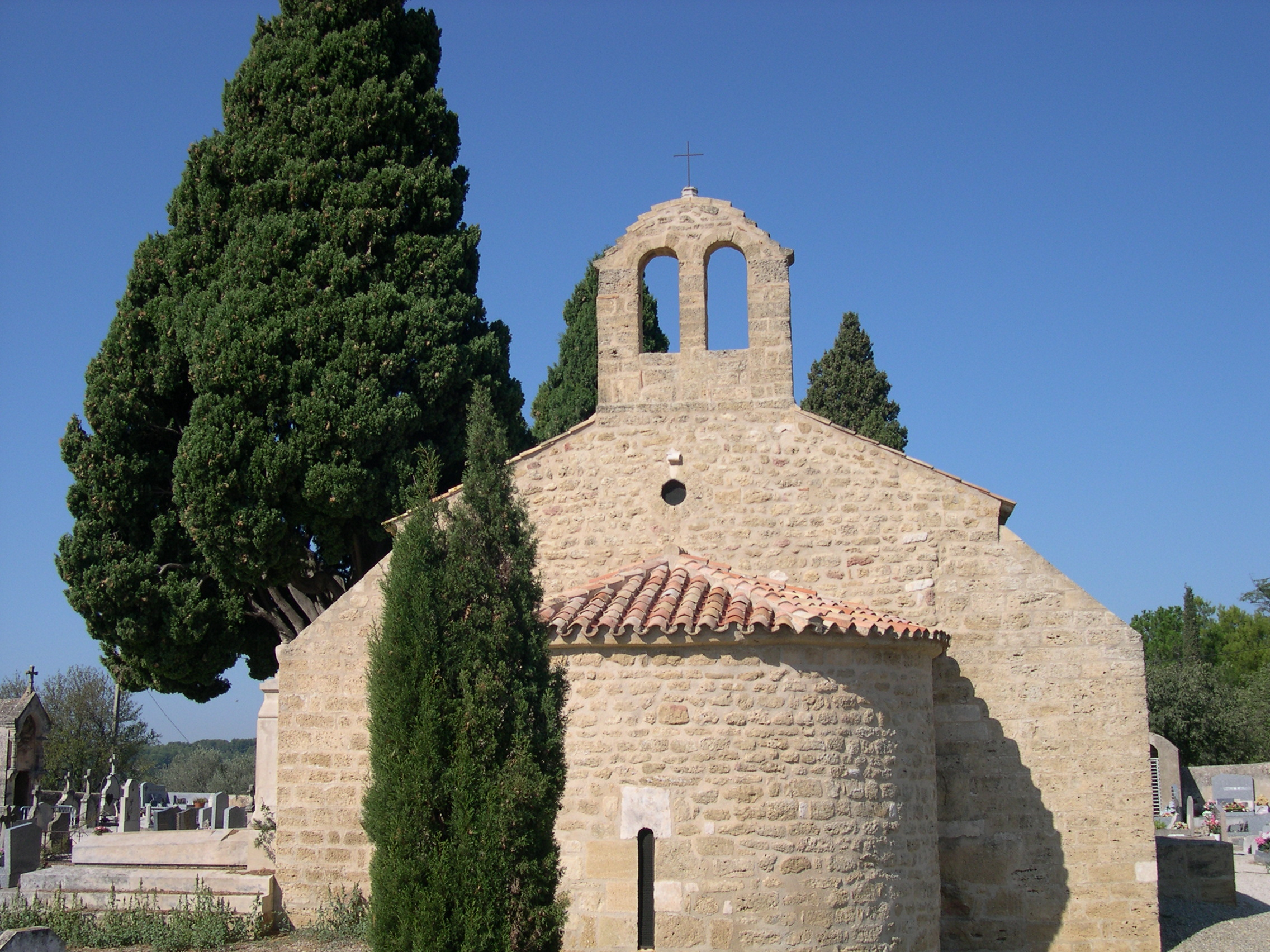
- The chapel of Saint Julien, situated in the old cemetery

- Coat of arms
- Location of Miramas
- Location within France Location within Provence-Alpes-Côte d'Azur
- Coordinates: 43°34′56″N 5°00′07″E
- Country: France
- Region: Provence-Alpes-Côte d'Azur
- Department: Bouches-du-Rhône
- Arrondissement: Istres
- Canton: Salon-de-Provence-2
- Intercommunality: Aix-Marseille-Provence

Government
  - Mayor (2026–32): Frédéric Vigouroux
- Area^{1}: 25.74 km^{2} (9.94 sq mi)
- Elevation: 49 m (161 ft)
- Highest elevation: 125 m (410 ft)
- Lowest elevation: 0 m (0 ft)
- Population (2023): 26,203
  - Density: 1,018/km^{2} (2,637/sq mi)
- Time zone: UTC+01:00 (CET)
  - Summer (DST): UTC+02:00 (CEST)
- INSEE/Postal code: 13063 /13140
- ^{1} French Land Register data, which excludes lakes, ponds, glaciers > 1 km^{2} (0.386 sq mi or 247 acres) and river estuaries.

Miramas (French pronunciation: [miʁamas]; Occitan: Miramàs) is a commune in the Bouches-du-Rhône department, in the Provence-Alpes-Côte d'Azur region, southern France. It is the second-largest commune in metropolitan Ouest-Provence and is located at the north end of the Étang de Berre lagoon, adjacent to and northeast of the city of Istres. Miramas station has rail connections to Marseille, Avignon, Martigues and Arles.

== Circuit of Miramas ==
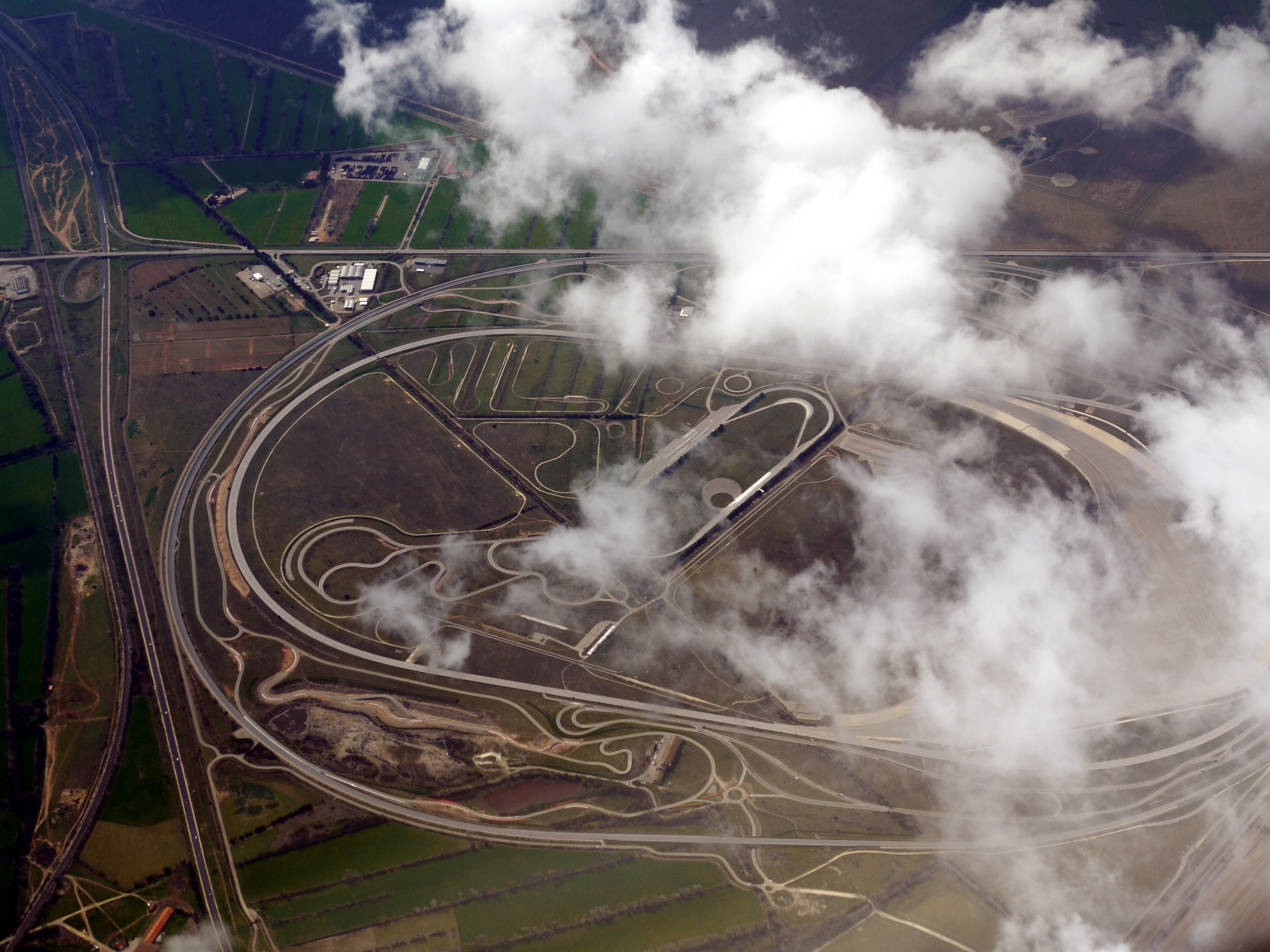

The Circuit of Miramas is located within 2 km of the town. In 1926 it hosted the French Grand Prix which was won by Frenchman Jules Goux driving a Bugatti T39A. Goux, the son of the superintendent at the Peugeot factory, had earlier became famous for winning the 1913 Indianapolis 500 while reportedly consuming four bottles of champagne during the course of the race. Goux had been the first foreign winner at Indianapolis.

Today the racetrack is owned by BMW and used as a vehicle test track.

== Population ==
Historical population

Year	Pop.	±% p.a.
1793	416	—
1800	376	−1.43%
1806	391	+0.65%
1821	489	+1.50%
1831	547	+1.13%
1836	498	−1.86%
1841	585	+3.27%
1846	858	+7.96%
1851	669	−4.85%
1856	734	+1.87%
1861	918	+4.58%
1866	1,057	+2.86%
1872	1,170	+1.71%
1876	1,040	−2.90%
1881	1,250	+3.75%
1886	1,318	+1.07%
1891	1,520	+2.89%
1896	2,129	+6.97%
1901	2,324	+1.77%

Year	Pop.	±% p.a.
1906	2,487	+1.36%
1911	2,975	+3.65%
1921	5,065	+5.47%
1926	5,161	+0.38%
1931	5,922	+2.79%
1936	6,594	+2.17%
1946	7,310	+1.04%
1954	8,325	+1.64%
1962	9,943	+2.24%
1968	10,544	+0.98%
1975	15,585	+5.74%
1982	20,414	+3.93%
1990	21,602	+0.71%
1999	22,526	+0.47%
2007	25,257	+1.44%
2012	25,064	−0.15%
2017	26,470	+1.10%
2023	26,203	−0.17%

Source: EHESS and INSEE (1968-2023)

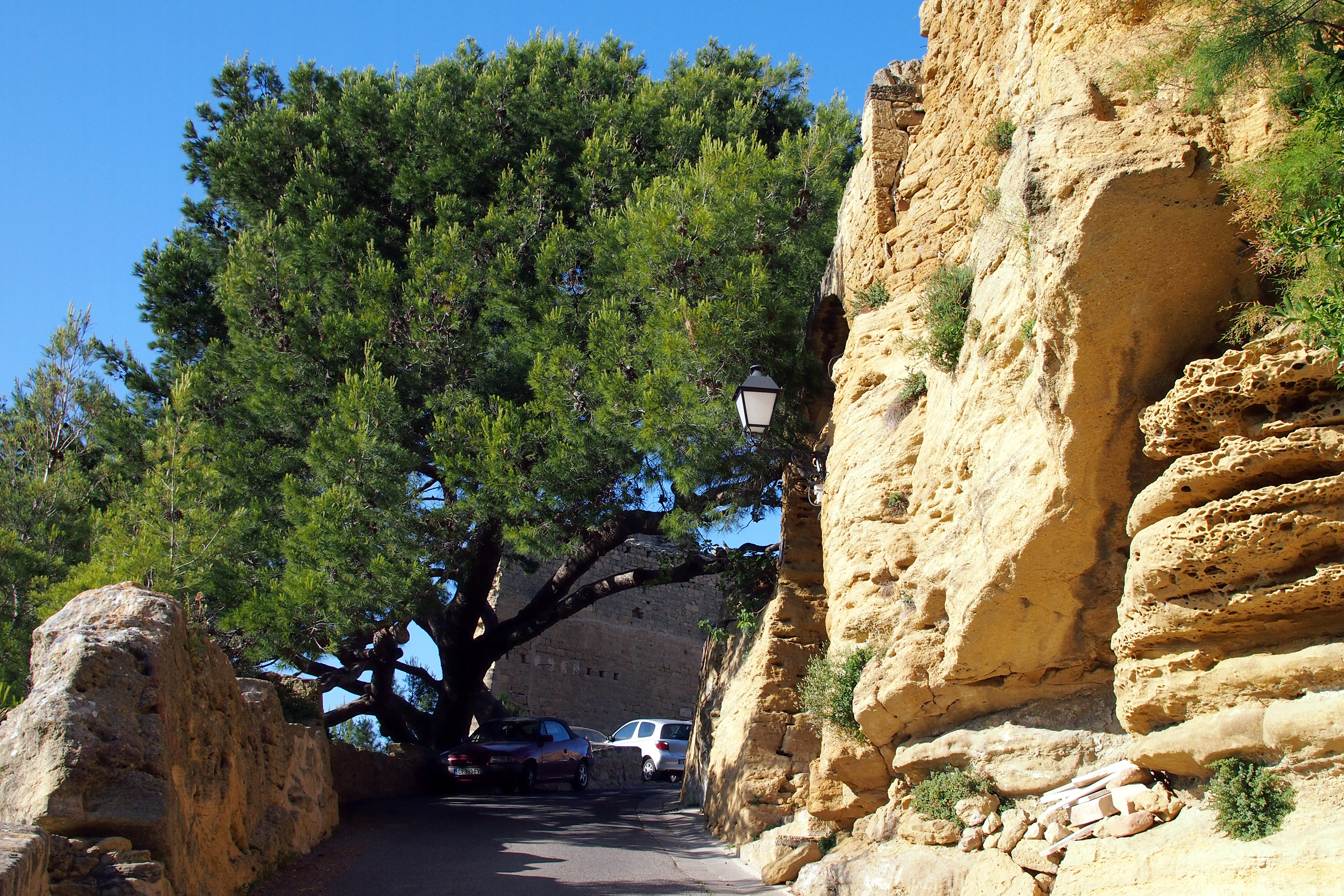
Miramas le Vieux, Aleppo pine

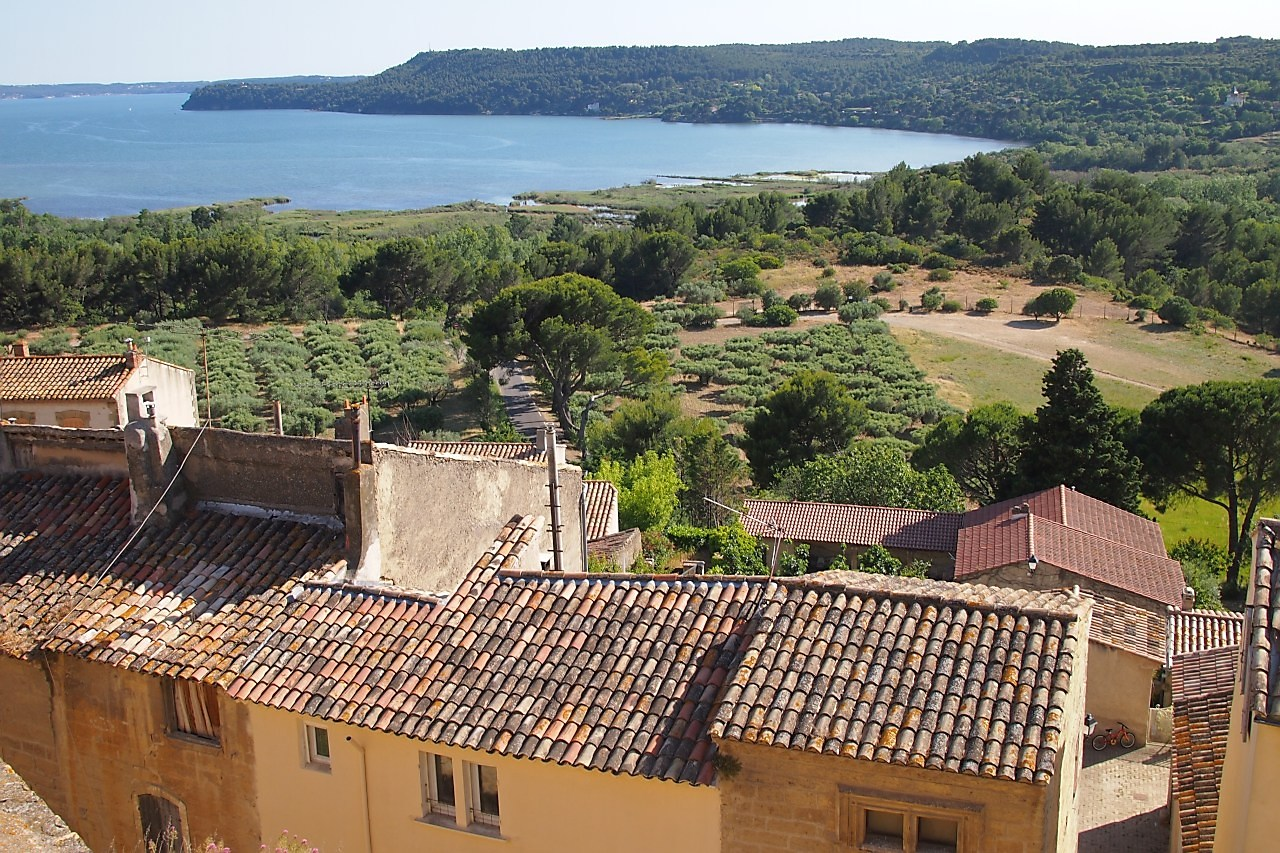
Miramas le Vieux / Étang de Berre

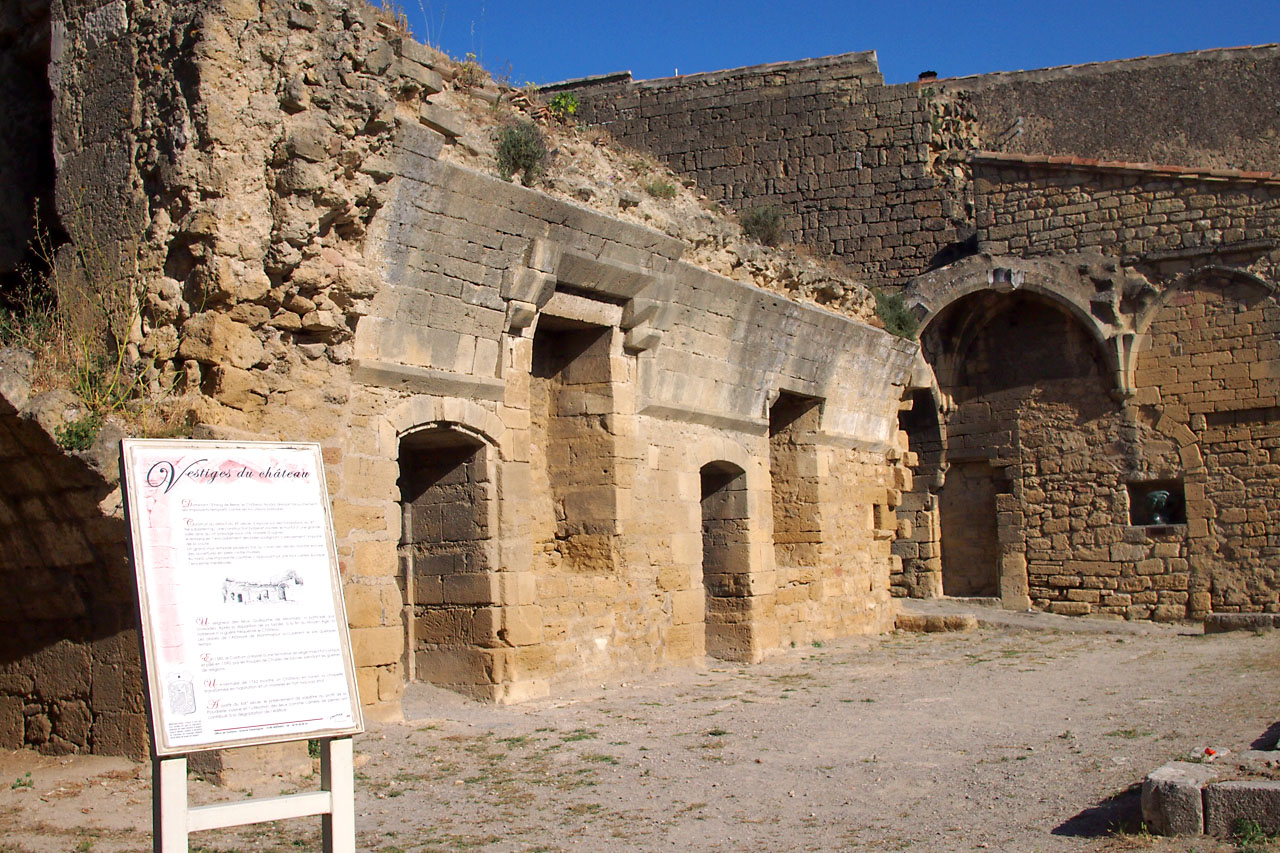
Miramas le Vieux, Château ruins

== See also ==
- Communes of the Bouches-du-Rhône department
