= Château de l'Empéri =

Coordinates: 43°38′22″N 5°5′50″E

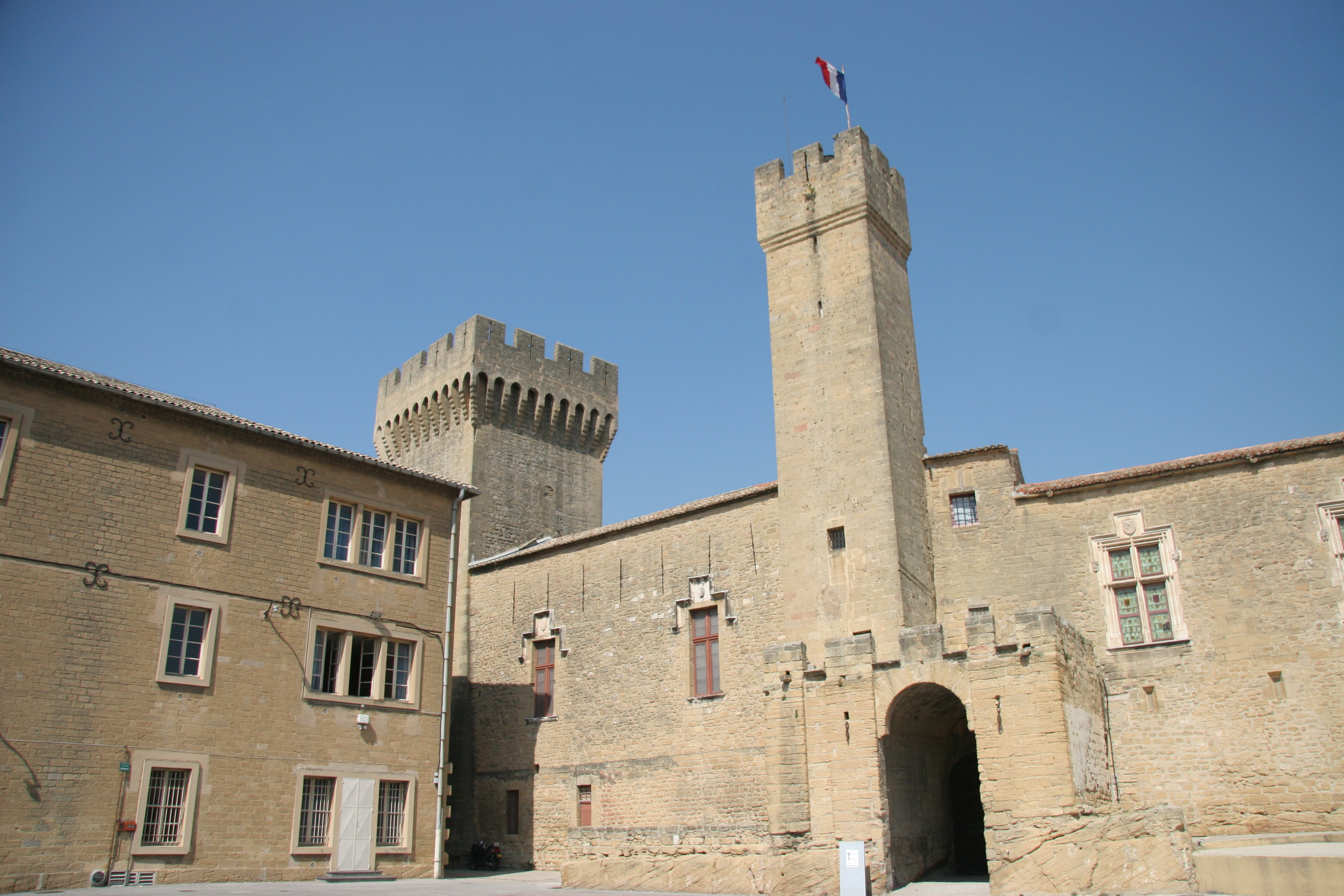
Entrance of Musée de L'Empéri inside the Château

The Château de l'Empéri (in Provençal Occitan: Castèu de l'Empèri) is a 9th-century castle built on the rock of Puech which dominates the immense plain of Crau in the commune of Salon-de-Provence in the Bouches-du-Rhône département of France. It is listed as a monument historique (historical monument) by the French Ministry of Culture since 1956.

== History ==
The castle was the residence of the archbishops of Arles as well as the Holy Roman emperors. It is from the latter that the castle derives its name of the Empire which at this time included the East bank of the Rhône River. During 1481, at the time of the junction with Provence, it came under the power of kings of France. Arranged and embellished during the 15th and 16th centuries it was used as jails and barracks after the Révolution time. Hardly damaged by an earthquake in 1909, the buildings were restored by the Monuments Historiques during 1926 and hosted the museum of the old Salon, before hosting now the present museum of Art and History Military.

In the Empéri stayed several kings and queens of France. Francis I and his court, Louis XIV. In 1660 Catherine de' Medici came to consult Nostradamus, the famous astrologer would have predicted the throne for her three sons and the accession of her nephew, the future king Henri IV.

The castle contains faithful representations of the various army corps from the Napoleonic Wars to the present day in its museum. The museum also contains a copy of a bed belonging to Napoleon I at Saint Helena.

== Architecture ==
In front of the castle is the Centuries Plaza (French: Place des Centuries) leading into the Church of Saint-Michel.

== Lycée de l'Empéri ==
The lycée adjacent to the Château also bears the name of « l'Emperi ». In Past times, this school prepared its pupils for the Air Force military school of Salon-de-Provence, passing which students can opt to join the Air Force or, if it interests them, attempt to join the prestigious Patrouille de France based in Salon. Currently, it is a rather prestigious lycée with programs in L, S, and ES, along with a Maths and Sciences prepa.

The Lycée de l'Empéri is also known for its catering services; several television programmes cover the famous annual Christmas dinner at the Lycée, to such an extent that the grounds are restricted between 14:00 and 15:00 hours to give the students a chance to have their meal. The canteen of the school and its chef have been the subject of a broadcast on the Métropole Télévision in October 2006.

With a passion for archaeology, Dominique Valadier, the lycée Chef, carried out the unique project "The hour of the plate" (French: L'heure de l'assiette) in 2003–2004 within the restaurant of Lycée de l'Empéri.

The school became a completely smoke-free zone starting in the 2005 academic year, applying rigorously the Évin Law (French: Loi Évin) of prohibition of smoking in public places.

== Culture ==
Each summer, the Château hosts a festival of chamber music, and some years also forms the venue for Nostradamiques – historical re-enactment of the time of Nostradamus together with processions and a transformation of the old medieval downtown. One such re-enactment was performed by the famous television presenter Jean-Pierre Foucault. In 2006, the town of Salon-de-Provence had the honour of hosting Robert Hossein, who lent his voice to the closing ceremony of the re-enactment.

== See also ==
- List of castles in France
