= Adam de Craponne =

French engineer

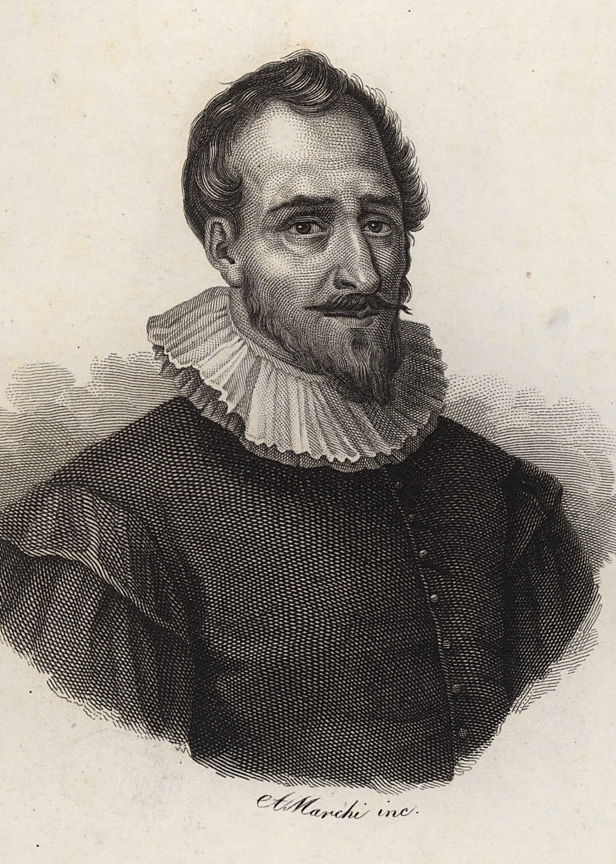
- Born: 1526; Salon-de-Provence, France
- Died: 1576; Nantes, France
- Known for: Building the Canal de Craponne
- Scientific career
- Fields: Engineering
- Patrons: Henry II of France, Henry III of France

Adam de Craponne (French: [adɑ̃ də kʁapɔn]; 1526–1576) was a French engineer. He built the eponymous Canal de Craponne to irrigate the Désert de la Crau. He was poisoned while fortifying Nantes for King Henry III of France during the French Wars of Religion

== Early life ==
De Craponne was born in 1526 in Salon-de-Provence.

== Career ==
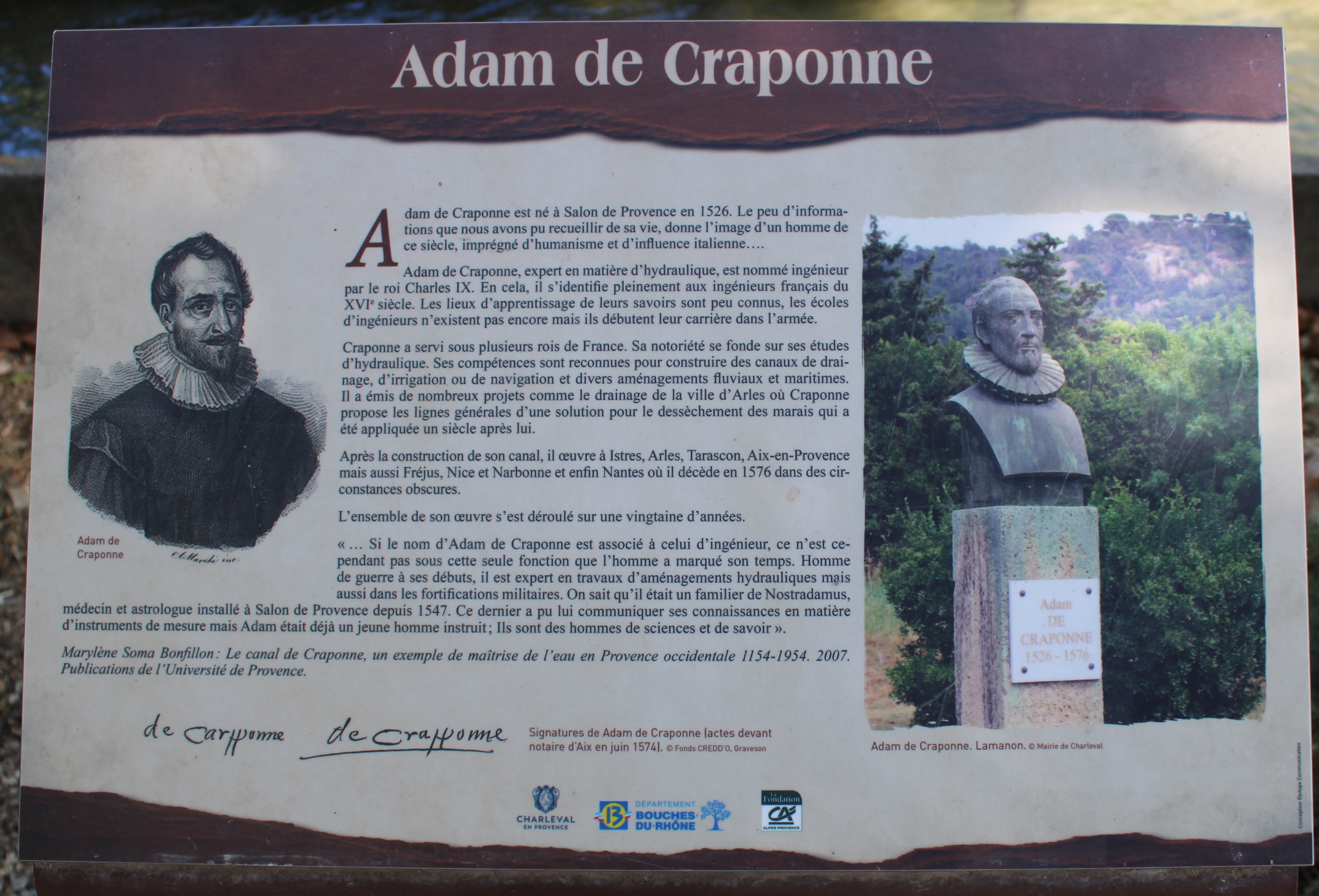
Plaque in honour of Adam de Craponne at Charleval, Bouches-du-Rhône.

After his studies, he went to the court of Henry II of France and became an engineer, officer in charge of fortifications. In 1552, he reinforced and reorganised the defences of Metz, against Charles V, Holy Roman Emperor.(:fr:)

In 1554, a decree of the Parliament of Provence (located in Aix-en-Provence), conferred on him the right to divert the waters of the river Durance to Salon-de-Provence, and from there to the sea.

Between 1557 and 1558, he built the Canal de Craponne which enabled irrigation of the Désert de la Crau with water coming from the Durance. De Craponne personally funded the project, with the help of private partners, such as Nostradamus, the reputed seer who, along with his wife Anne Ponsard, acquired a one-thirteenth share in the canal project. (See Canal de Craponne#Contract law for the unforeseen legal and financial consequences over the ensuing 458 years.)

In 1571, he was hired by the municipality of Les Mées, Alpes-de-Haute-Provence to restore the water intake of an irrigation canal.

== Death ==
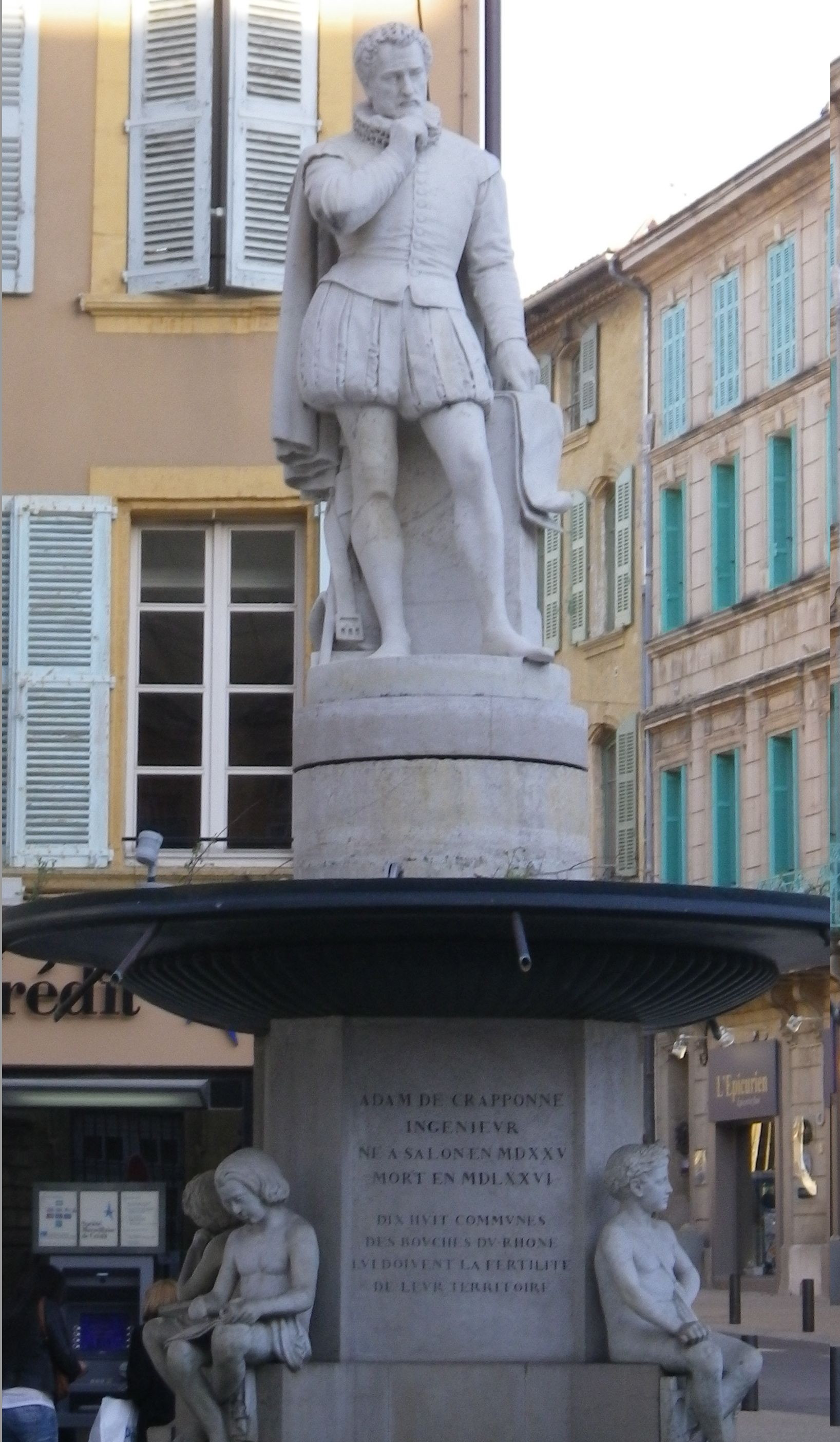
Statue of Adam de Craponne at Salon-de-Provence, France

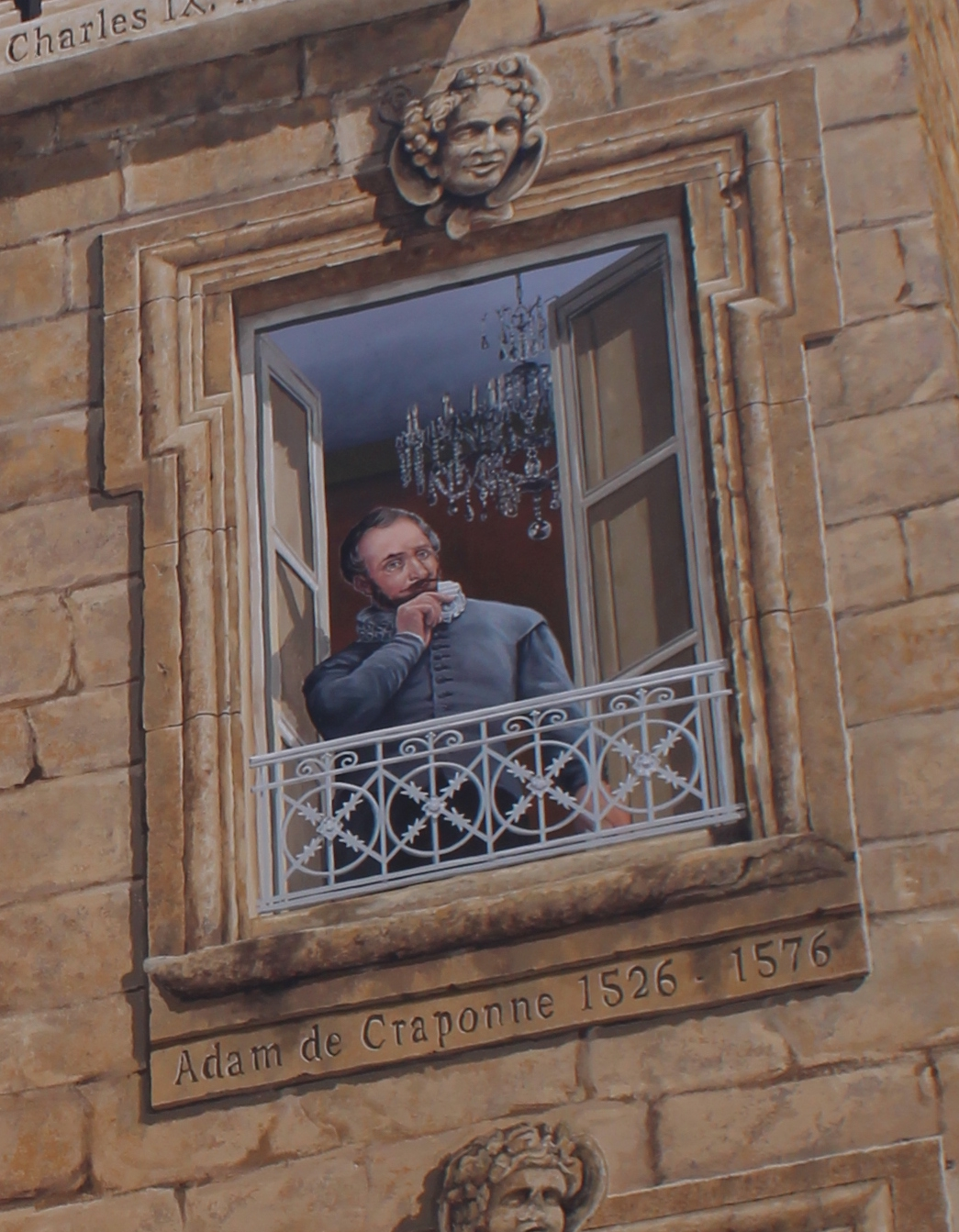
Trompe-l'œil of Adam de Craponne at Château de l'Empéri, Salon-de-provence.

He died of poisoning in Nantes on December 20, 1576, while working for King Henry III of France. The country was plagued by the turmoil of the Wars of Religion, and Henry's authority was undermined by foreign powers: the Catholic League, the Protestant Huguenots and the Malcontents.

De Craponne's grand-nephew, Seigneur (Lord) Paul de Grignan, (it: De Grignan) wrote:

“In the year 1576, 'ledict' Adam de Craponne died of illness in Nantes, Brittany, employed by King Henry III of France to fortify the city, where he was believed to have been poisoned by envious Italian workers, ... He died within 24 hours and was buried in the l'église Notre-Dame”.

According to some sources, he was poisoned by engineers envious of his success.

== Contract Law ==
Adam de Craponne was the unwitting, underlying cause of a notorious case in French contract law that still reverberates 450 years after his death. The original Canal de Craponne investors formally undertook to maintain the canal against a payment of three French sols for every two hectares irrigated by the farmers. Slowly this payment became derisory and out of proportion to the cost of maintenance, so the heirs of Adam de Craponne were granted an increase by the lower court. But in 1876 the farmers sought legal review and the decision of the Court of Appeal of Aix-en-Provence was quashed.

After more than a century of further academic debate, the reform of French contract law (10 February 2016) overruled the Cour de cassation’s infamous decision on Canal de Craponne, according to which even a 300-year-old contract could not be modified to accommodate a change of circumstances that had rendered performance significantly more onerous for one of the parties.

== See also ==
- fr: Canal de Craponne (arrêt) - one of the largest judgements of the Court of Cassation.

== Bibliography ==
- Brind'Amour, Pierre (1993). Nostradamus astrophile: les astres et l'astrologie dans la vie et l'œuvre de Nostradamus. Presses de l'Université d'Ottawa. ISBN 978-2-252-02896-4.
