= Salon-de-Provence =

Commune in Provence-Alpes-Côte d'Azur, France

Salon-de-Provence Selon de Provença (Occitan)
- Commune
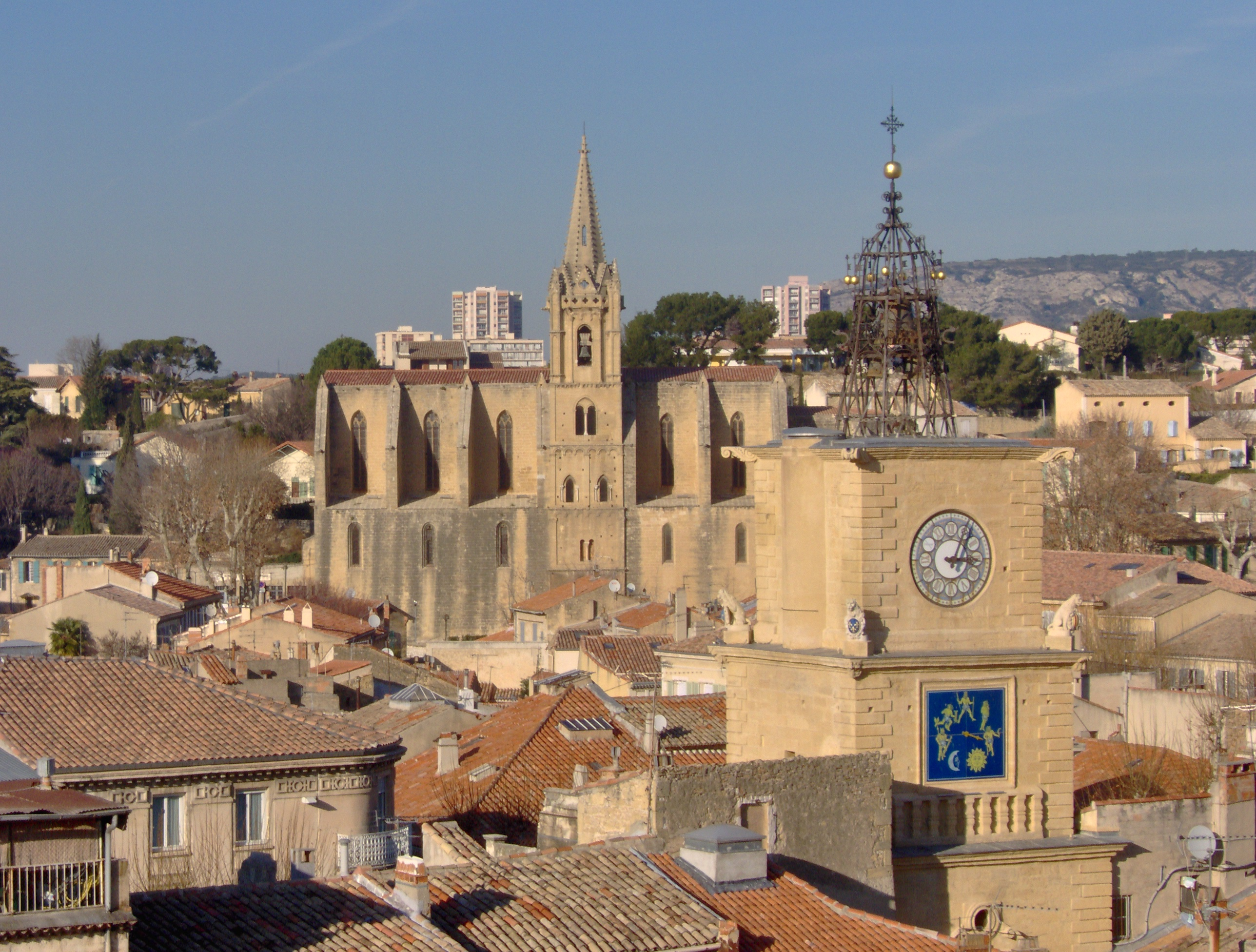
- A view of Salon-de-Provence, with the church and clock tower

- Coat of arms
- Location of Salon-de-Provence
- Location within France Location within Provence-Alpes-Côte d'Azur
- Country: France
- Region: Provence-Alpes-Côte d'Azur
- Department: Bouches-du-Rhône
- Arrondissement: Aix-en-Provence
- Canton: Salon-de-Provence-1 and 2
- Intercommunality: Aix-Marseille-Provence Metropolis

Government
  - Mayor (2026–32): Nicolas Isnard (LR)
- Area^{1}: 70.3 km^{2} (27.1 sq mi)
- Highest elevation: 325 m (1,066 ft)
- Lowest elevation: 53 m (174 ft)
- Population (2023): 44,194
  - Density: 629/km^{2} (1,630/sq mi)
- Demonym(s): Salonais, salonaise (French); Selonenc, selonenca (Occitan)
- Time zone: UTC+01:00 (CET)
  - Summer (DST): UTC+02:00 (CEST)
- INSEE/Postal code: 13103 /13300
- ^{1} French Land Register data, which excludes lakes, ponds, glaciers > 1 km^{2} (0.386 sq mi or 247 acres) and river estuaries.

Salon-de-Provence (French: [salɔ̃ d(ə) pʁɔvɑ̃s], locally [saˈlɔ̃ᵑ də pχoˈvãⁿsə]; Provençal Occitan: Selon de Provença or Seloun de Prouvènço, pronounced [seˈlu de pʀuˈvɛnsɔ]), commonly known as Salon, is a commune located about 52 km (32 mi) northwest of Marseille in the Bouches-du-Rhône department (Metropolis of Aix-Marseille Provence), region of Provence-Alpes-Côte d'Azur, southern France. It is the home of an important French Air and Space Force (Armée de l'Air et de l'Espace) air base.

== History ==
Salon was a Gallo-Roman oppidum well positioned on the salt trade routes between Adriatic, Atlantic and Mediterranean seas, hence its name. This region was under the Phocaean influence since the sixth century BC, and stretches of the Via Aurelia can still be recognized just outside the town, but the earliest mention of the place under its familiar name is of the ninth century, as Villa Salone. The archbishops of Arles controlled the site.

Its principal claim to fame today is as the place where Nostradamus spent his last years and is buried. His dwelling is maintained as a museum, and for four days every June or July, the city celebrates its history during the time of Nostradamus, attracting tourists.

The historic center still lies within its circuit of walls, entered through two seventeenth-century gateways, the Porte de l'Horloge and the Porte du Bourg Neuf.

In 1559 the engineer Adam de Craponne opened the Canal de Craponne to bring fresh water from the river Durance to the town and the surrounding plain of Crau. Inexpensive freight brought commerce to Salon, and the town prospered.

== Sights ==
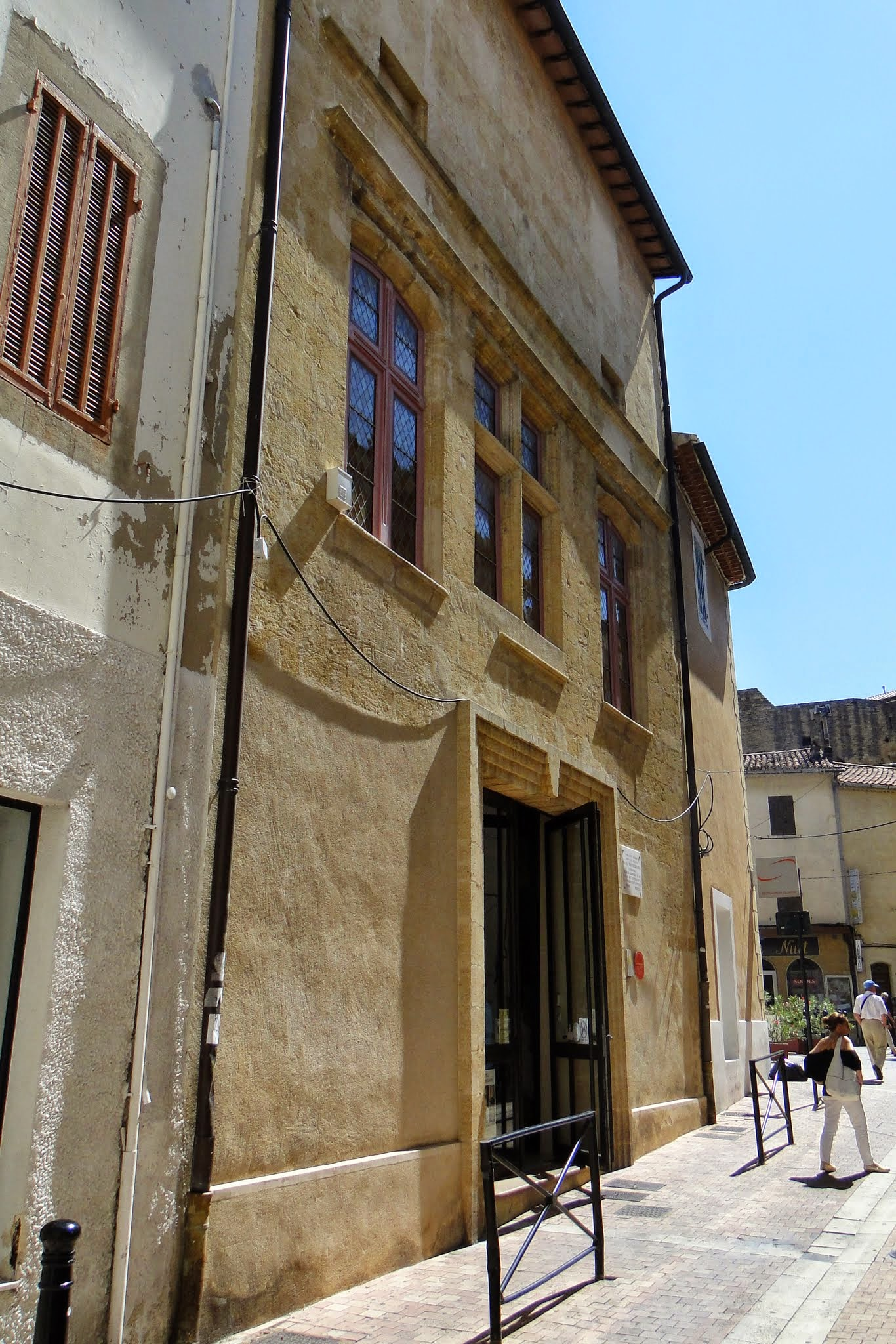
Nostradamus House

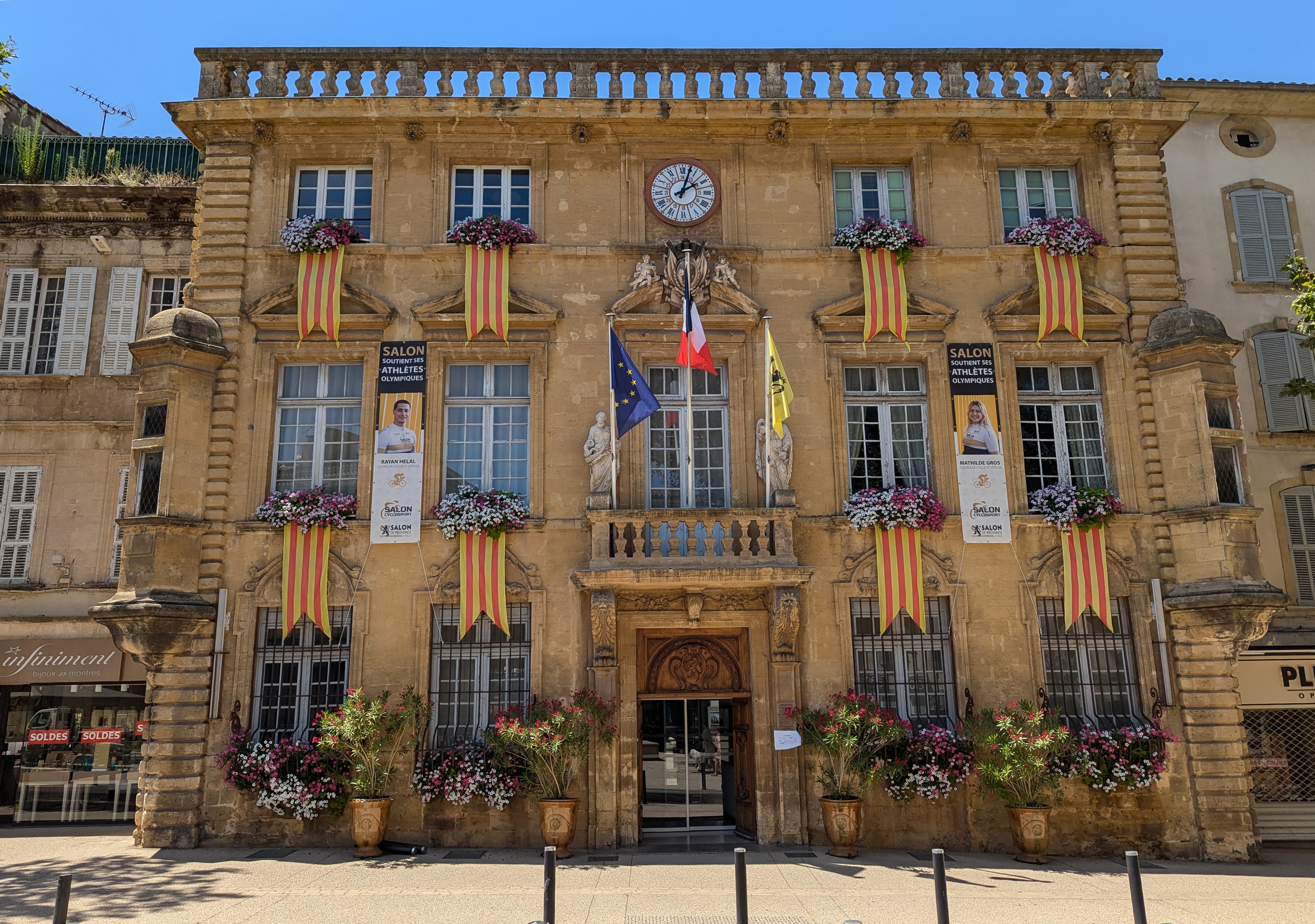
The Hôtel de Ville

=== Château de l'Emperi ===
The castle, which was the biggest in Provence during the 12th and 13th centuries and was mentioned as early as the tenth, still dominates the old town. It was the preferred residence of the bishops of Arles, when Provence was part of the Holy Roman Empire, hence its name. It became the property of the city after the French Revolution. After damage caused by the 1909 earthquake, it has been restored and now hosts a museum of military history. Every summer, it hosts an international classical music festival.

=== Fontaine Moussue ===
The fountain in Place Crousillat has existed since the 16th century. During the 20th century, limestone concretions and vegetation developed, giving the familiar mushroom aspect.

=== St Michel Chapel ===
Built during the 13th century, this chapel boasts a remarkable Romanesque tympanum featuring the paschal lamb.

=== Collégiale Saint Laurent ===
The current edifice was erected during 15th century by Cardinal Louis Aleman, who was then bishop of Arles.

=== The Hôtel de Ville ===
The Hôtel de Ville was completed in 1658.

=== Salon-de-Provence Air Base ===
Salon-de-Provence Air Base is the site of the French Air Force Academy, as well as the home of the French Aerial Demonstration team, the Patrouille de France.

=== Market ===
Every Wednesday the Place Morgan is host to a Provençal market.

== Culture ==
Each summer, the Château de l'Empéri hosts a festival of chamber music.

Some years the Château is the venue for Nostradamiques – an historical re-enactment of the time of Nostradamus which includes processions and a transformation of the old medieval downtown. One such re-enactment was performed by the television presenter Jean-Pierre Foucault. In 2006 Robert Hossein compered the closing ceremony of the re-enactment.

== Personalities ==
- Abba Mari ben Eligdor (fl.1335), distinguished Talmudist, philosopher, resident 14th Century
- Nostradamus (1503–1566), resident 1547–66, place of death
- Adam de Craponne (1526–1576), engineer, born in Salon
- Miquèu Tronc (16th century), Occitan language writer
- Jean Baptiste Christophore Fusée Aublet (1720–1778), French botanist and explorer, birthplace
- Joan Montseny (1864-1942), Catalan anarchist, place of death
- Charles Trenet (1913-2001), French singer, resident for military reasons, 1939–1940
- Romain Gary (1914–1980), French novelist and pilot, learnt to fly with military in Salon-de-Provence before Nazi occupation of France
- Patrick Baudry (1946-), and Léopold Eyharts (1957-), French astronauts, military training
- Daniel Goossens (1954-), Cartoonist, birthplace
- Christine Boisson (1956-), French actor, birthplace
- Franck Esposito (1971-), French swimmer, birthplace
- Michaël N'dri (1984-), footballer, birthplace and early Football career
- Mathieu Arzeno (1987-), racing driver, birthplace
- Simon Porte Jacquemus (1990-), Fashion Designer
- Nassourdine Imavov (1995-), MMA fighter, former resident
- Sakina Karchaoui (1996-), footballer for Paris Saint-Germain and the France national team
- Mathys Jaubert (2005-), racing driver

== Twin towns – sister cities ==
Salon-de-Provence is twinned with:

- Blanzy-la-Salonnaise, France
- Aranda de Duero, Spain
- Gubbio, Italy
- Huntingdon, England, United Kingdom
- Godmanchester, England, United Kingdom
- Szentendre, Hungary
- Wertheim am Main, Germany

== Gallery ==
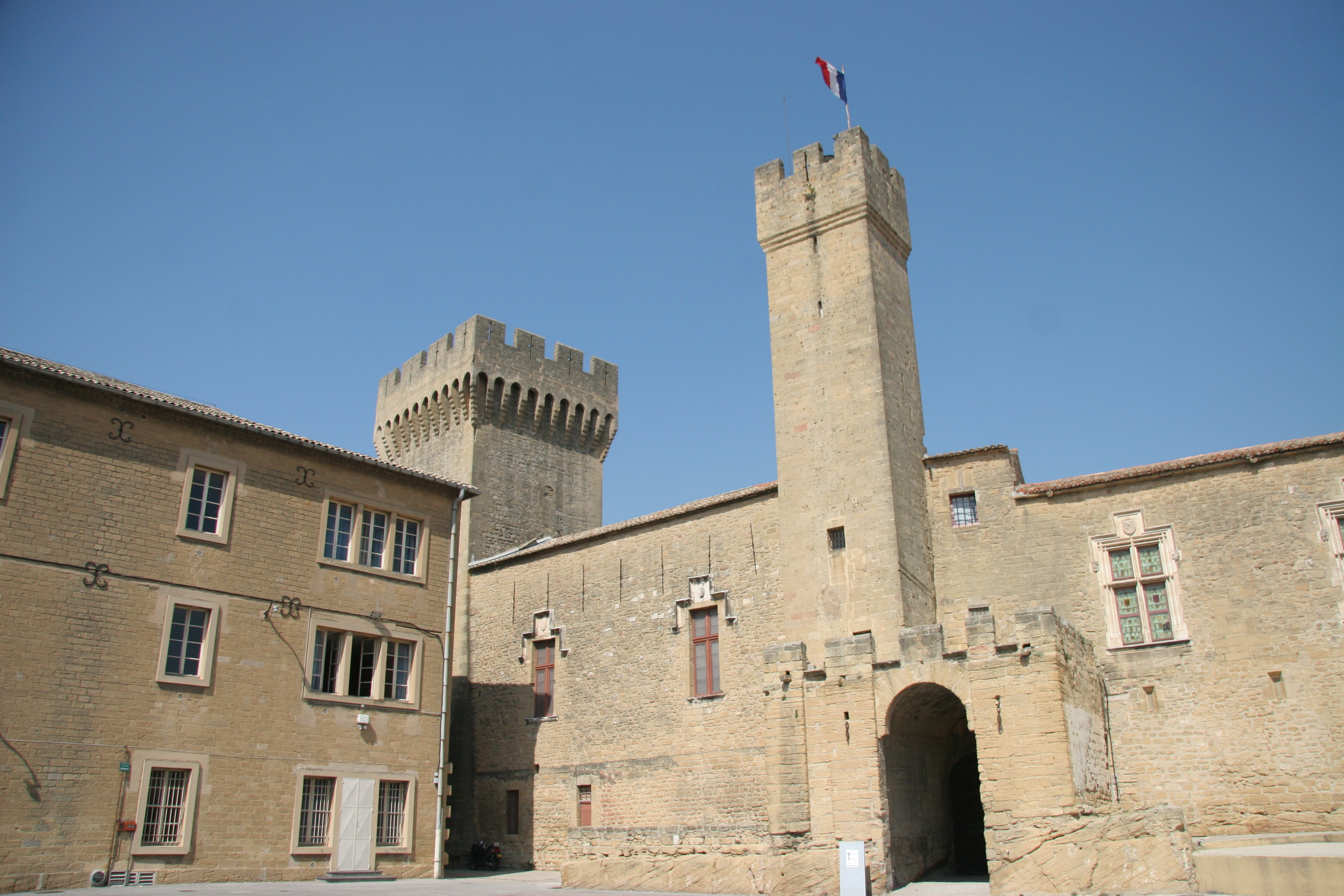
Château de l'Empéri courtyard

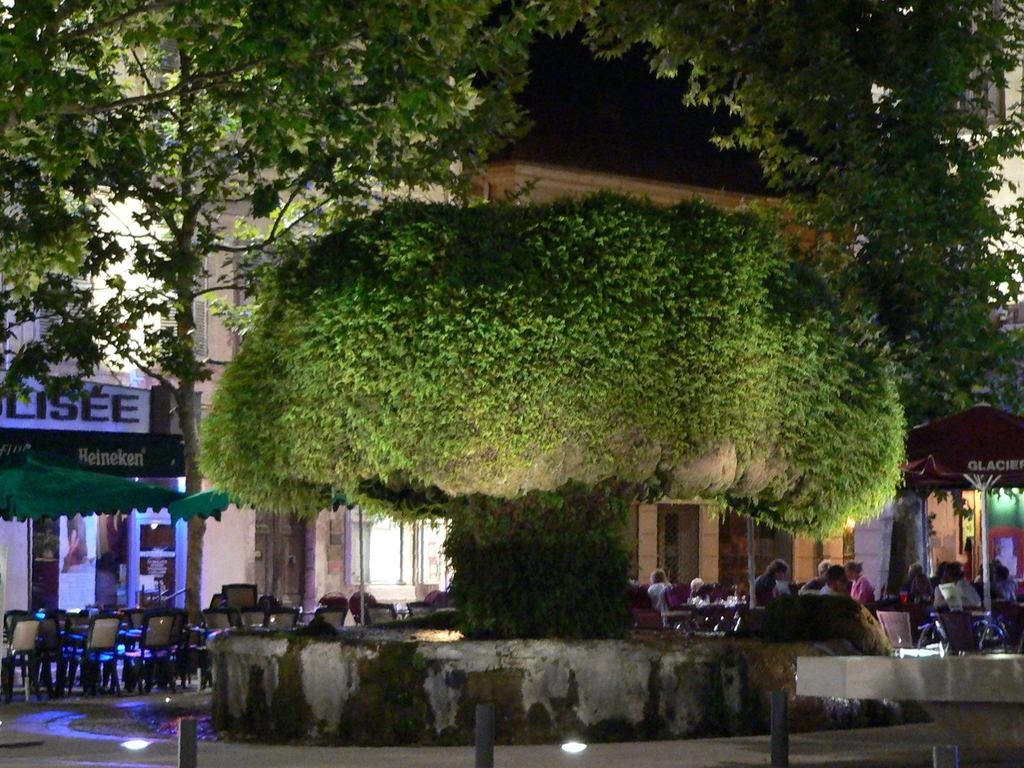
Fontaine Moussue by night

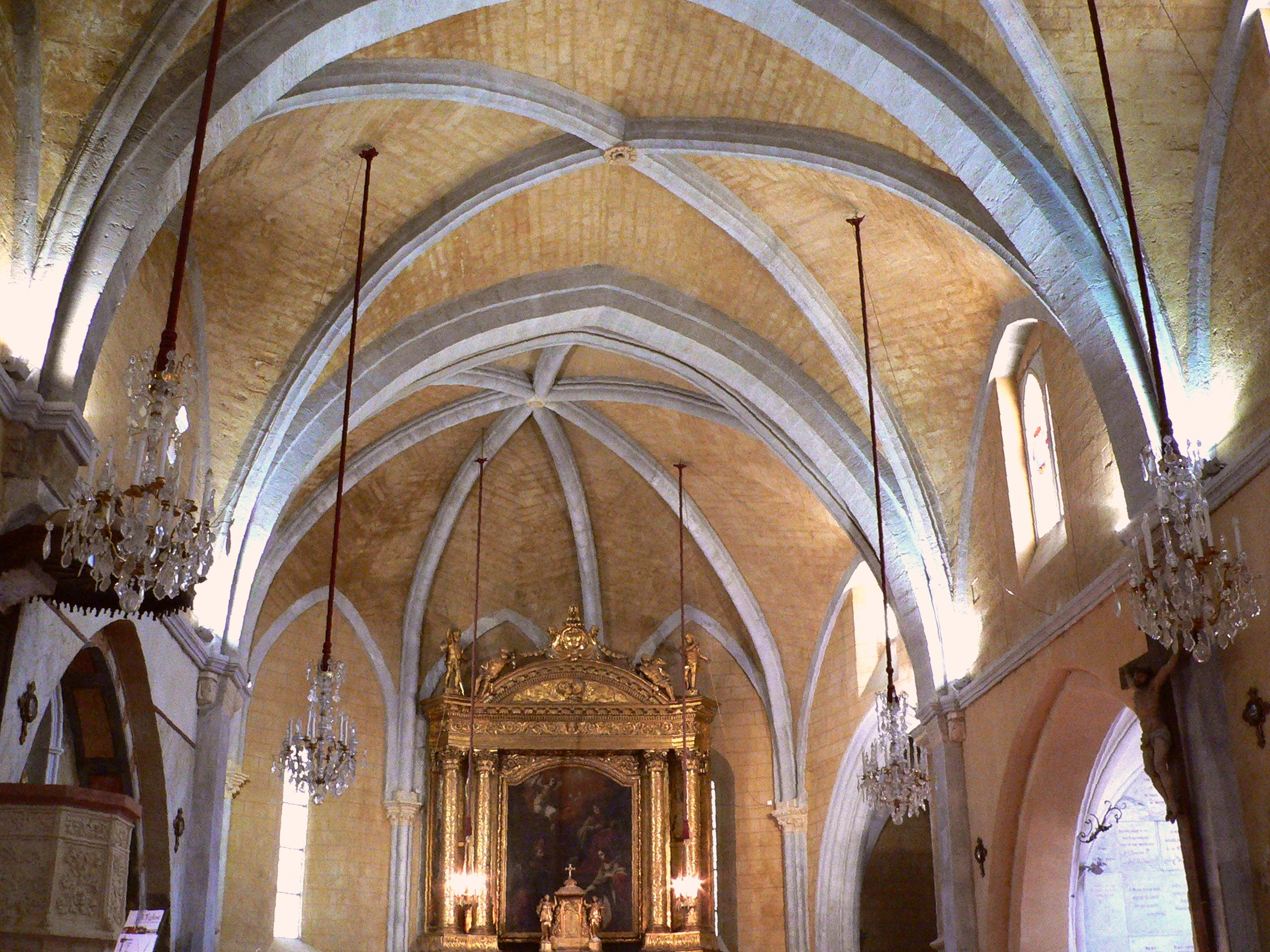
St Michel, inside

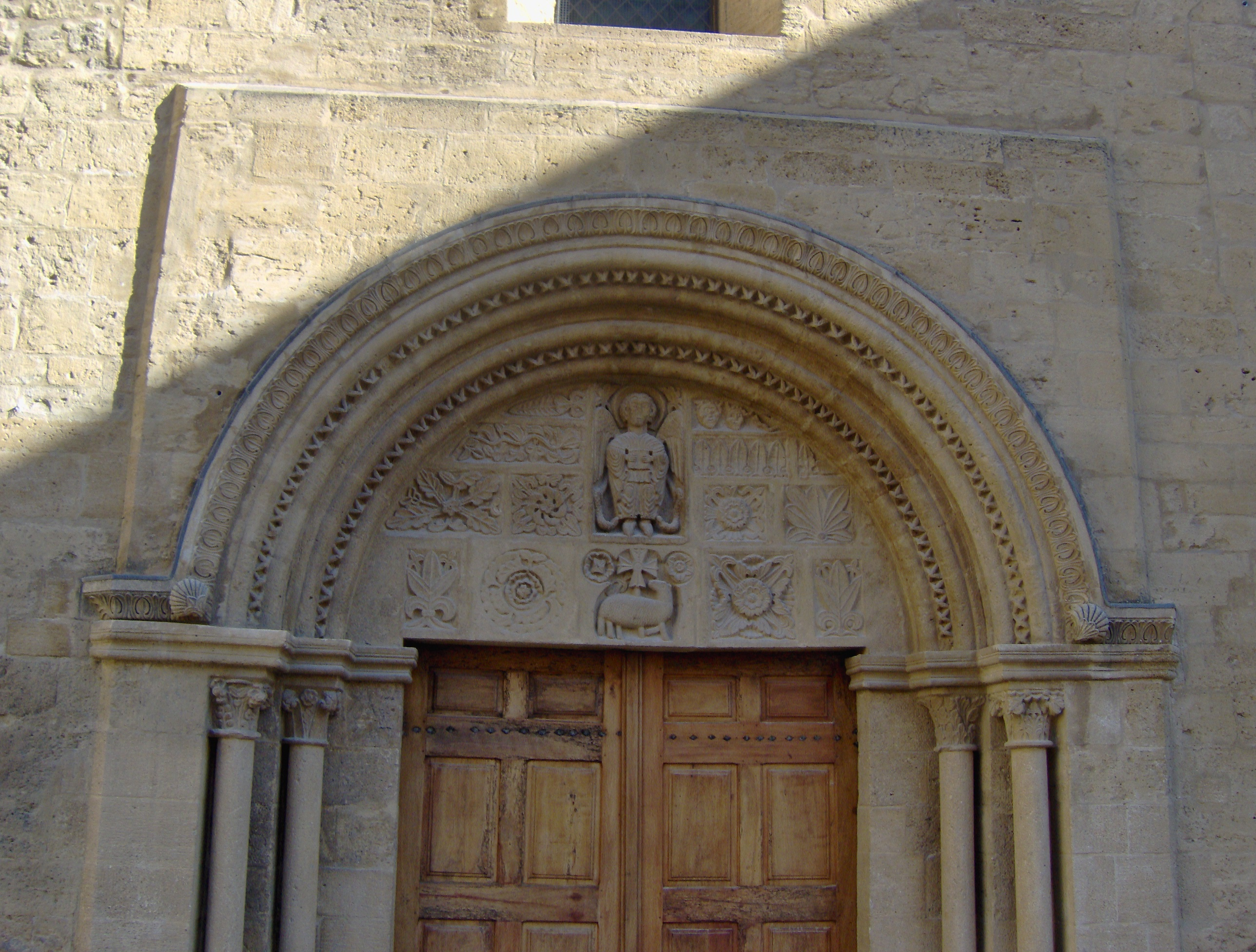
Tympanum, Église St-Michel

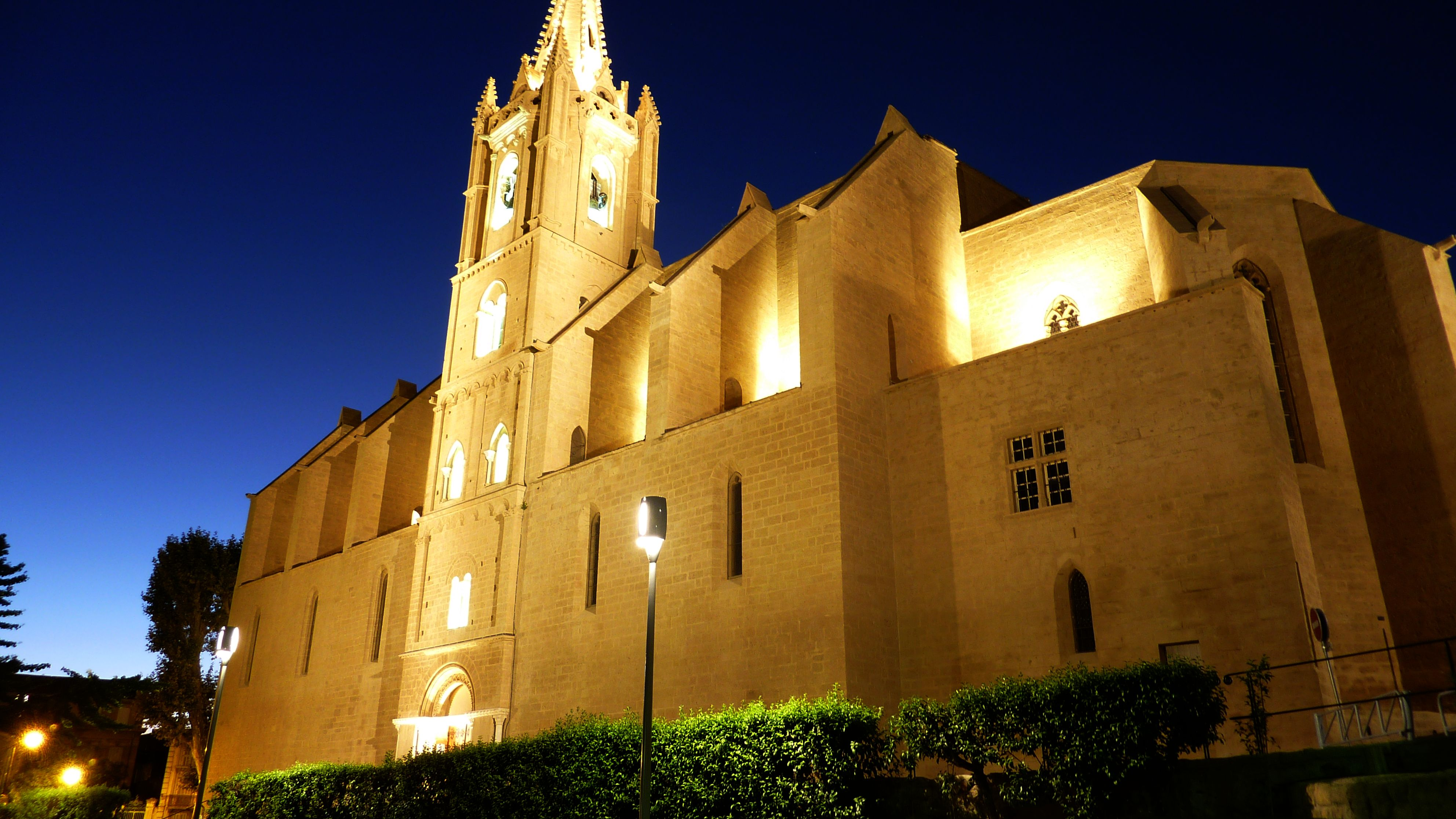
Collégiale Saint Laurent, after 2008/2009 restorations

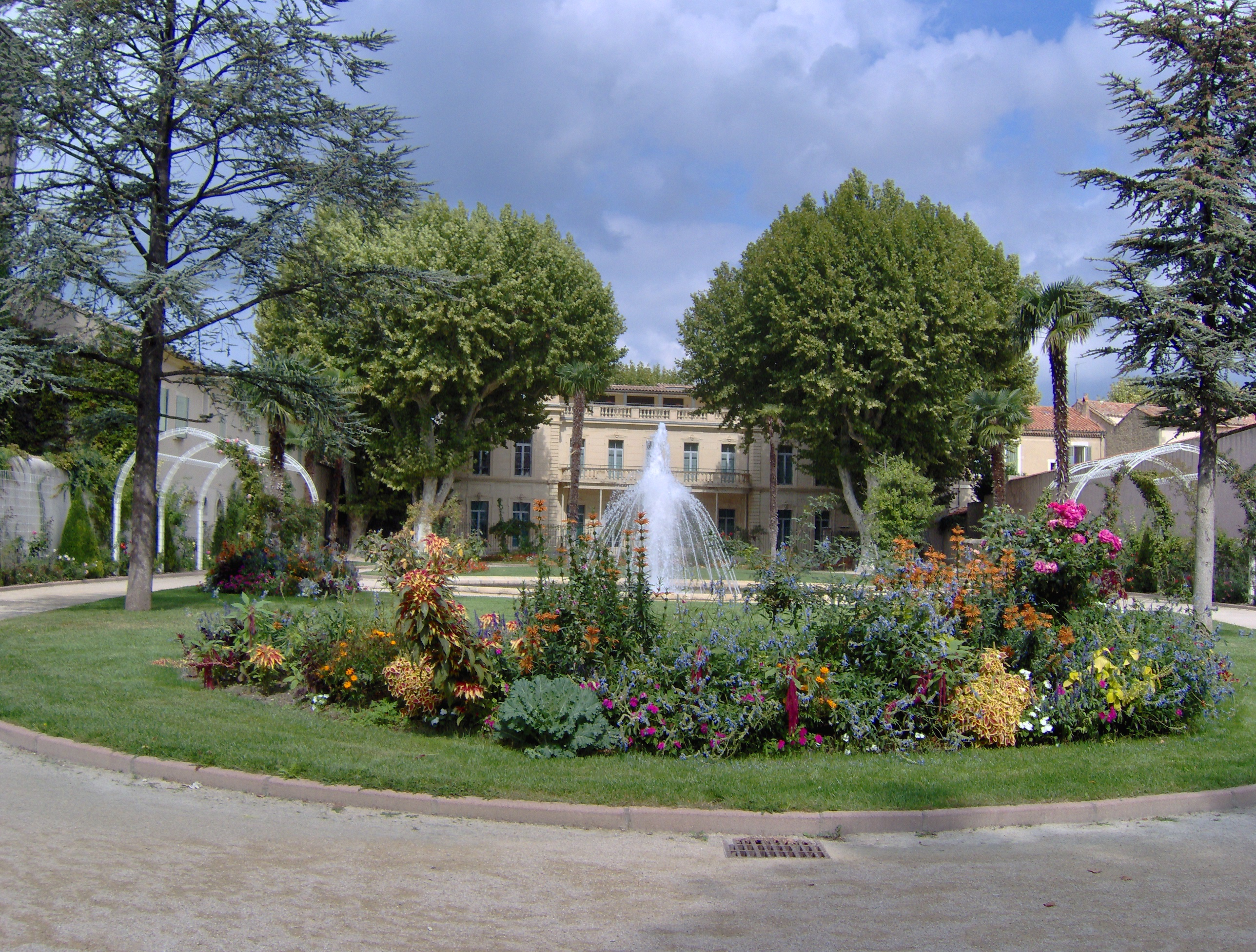
Jardin de la République

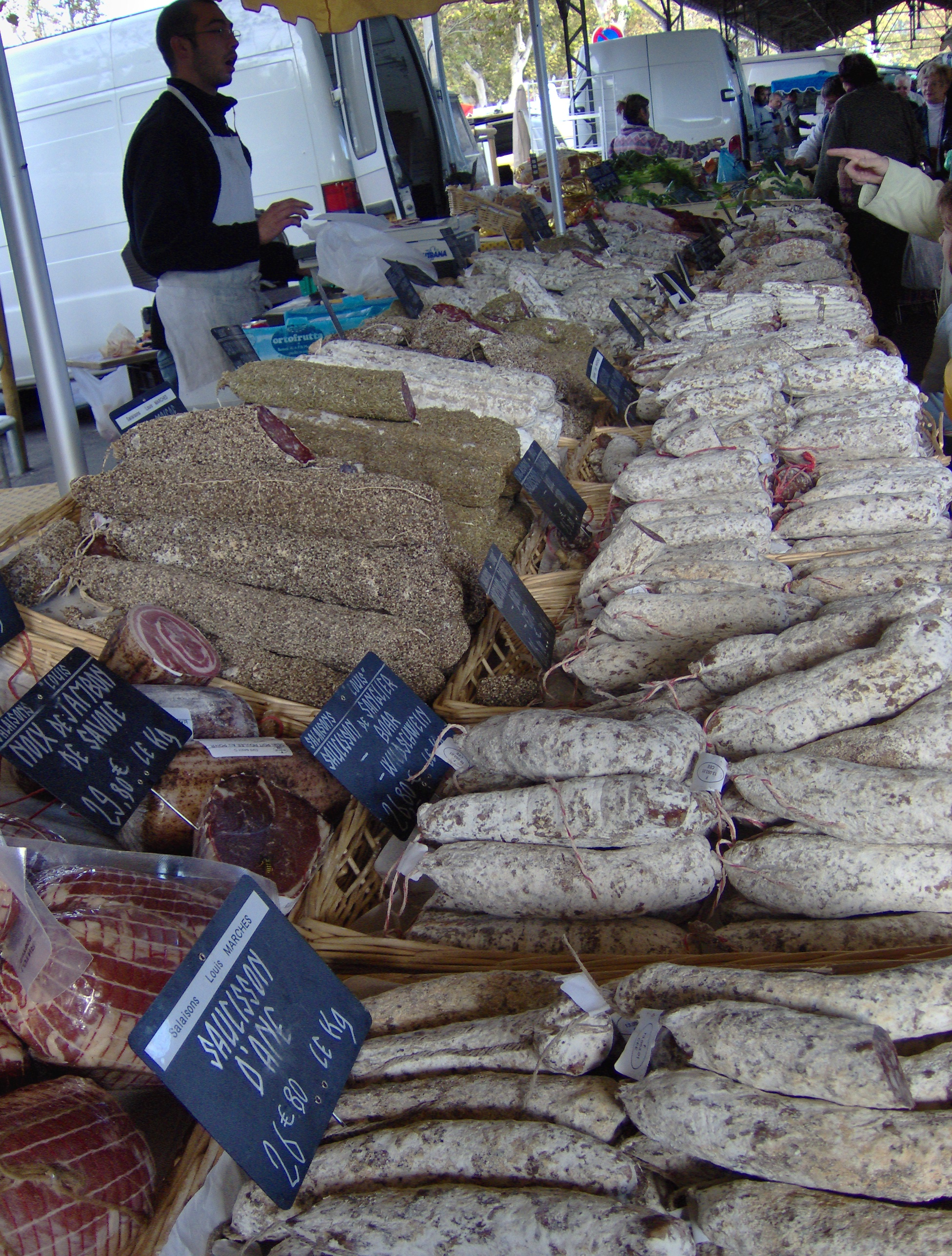
Sausages, market at Place Morgan

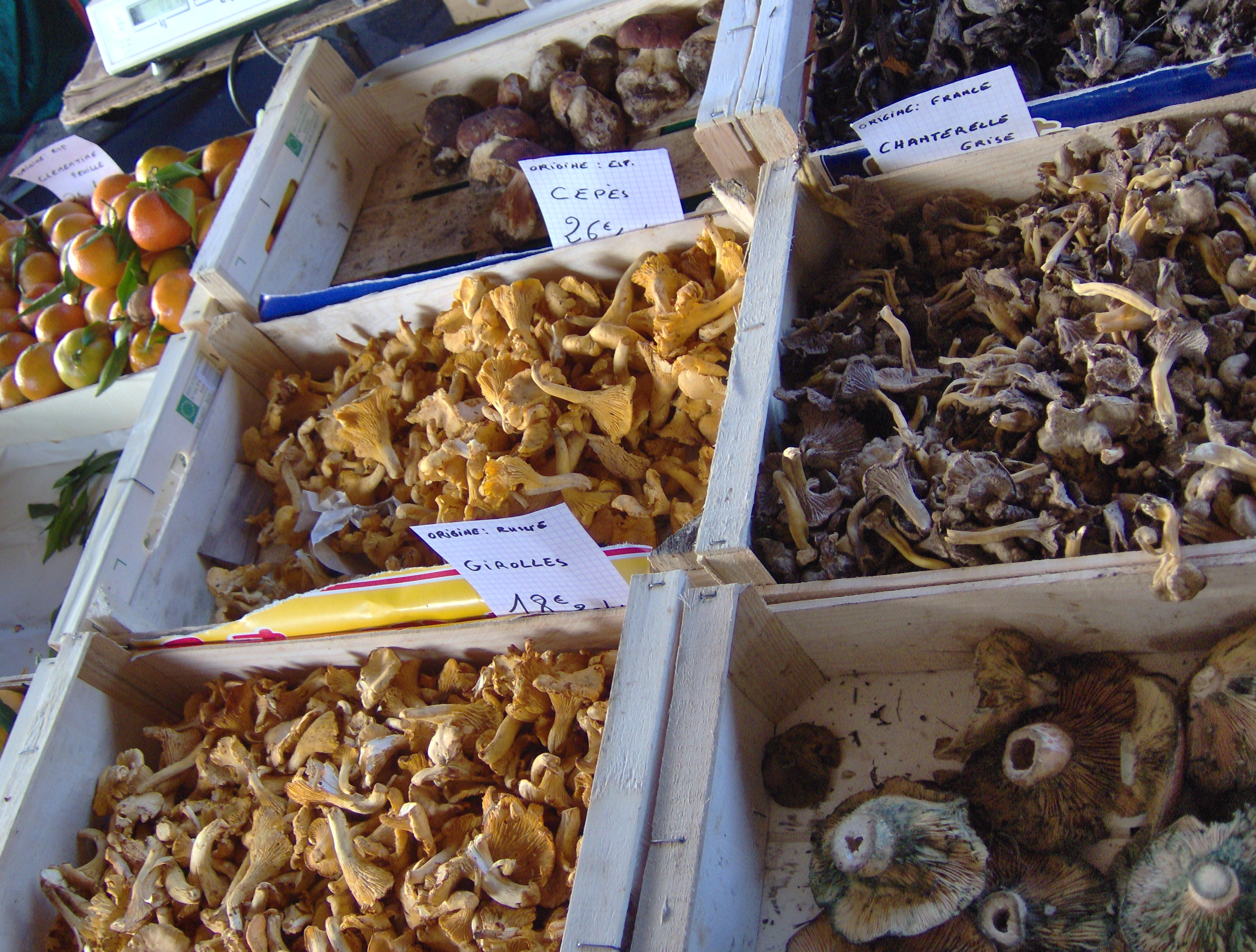
Mushrooms, market at Place Morgan

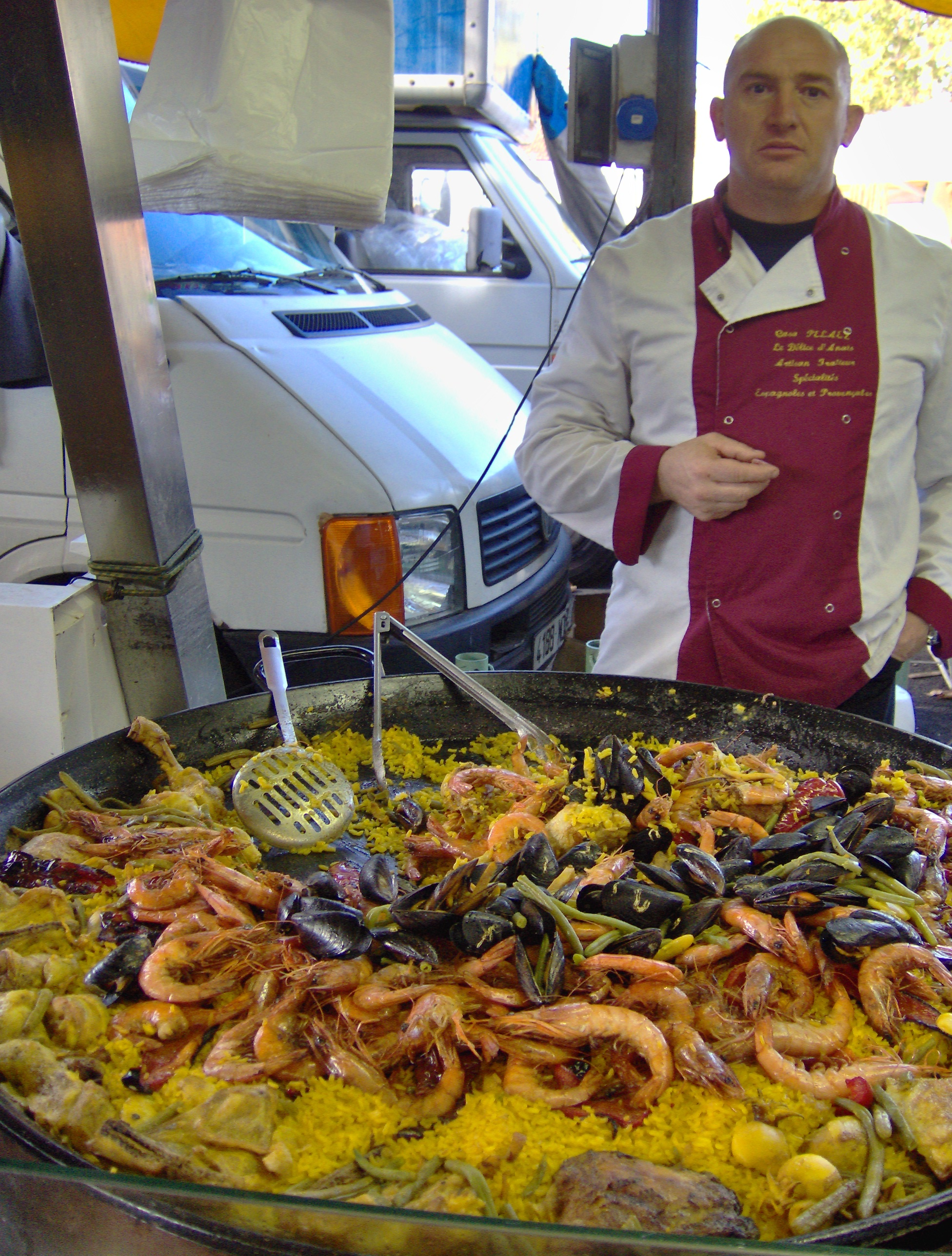
Paella, market at Place Morgan

== Social Housing ==
In August 2025, the 12-story Sofia Tower, containing 48 residential units, will be demolished as part of the overall rehabilitation project for the Canourgues district by 2030.

== Population ==
Historical population

Year	Pop.	±% p.a.
1793	6,787	—
1800	5,100	−4.00%
1806	5,167	+0.22%
1821	5,864	+0.85%
1831	5,987	+0.21%
1836	5,793	−0.66%
1841	5,617	−0.62%
1846	6,355	+2.50%
1851	6,564	+0.65%
1856	7,057	+1.46%
1861	6,533	−1.53%
1866	6,714	+0.55%
1872	7,522	+1.91%
1876	7,021	−1.71%
1881	7,503	+1.34%
1886	8,598	+2.76%
1891	9,152	+1.26%
1896	10,936	+3.63%
1901	12,872	+3.31%

Year	Pop.	±% p.a.
1906	14,050	+1.77%
1911	14,019	−0.04%
1921	13,155	−0.63%
1926	12,900	−0.39%
1931	13,193	+0.45%
1936	13,482	+0.43%
1946	15,826	+1.62%
1954	17,597	+1.33%
1962	21,393	+2.47%
1968	30,722	+6.22%
1975	34,576	+1.70%
1982	34,846	+0.11%
1990	34,064	−0.28%
1999	37,079	+0.95%
2007	40,943	+1.25%
2012	43,771	+1.34%
2017	45,528	+0.79%
2023	44,194	−0.49%

Source: EHESS and INSEE (1968-2023)

== Climate ==
Climate data for Salon-de-Provence (1991–2020 normals, extremes 1939–present)
Month	Jan	Feb	Mar	Apr	May	Jun	Jul	Aug	Sep	Oct	Nov	Dec	Year
Record high °C (°F)	20.8 (69.4)	23.1 (73.6)	25.7 (78.3)	29.2 (84.6)	34.4 (93.9)	43.4 (110.1)	39.7 (103.5)	39.8 (103.6)	35.1 (95.2)	30.1 (86.2)	24.8 (76.6)	22.0 (71.6)	43.4 (110.1)
Mean daily maximum °C (°F)	11.5 (52.7)	12.7 (54.9)	16.5 (61.7)	19.3 (66.7)	23.4 (74.1)	27.8 (82.0)	30.7 (87.3)	30.4 (86.7)	25.7 (78.3)	20.9 (69.6)	15.2 (59.4)	11.9 (53.4)	20.5 (68.9)
Daily mean °C (°F)	6.7 (44.1)	7.3 (45.1)	10.5 (50.9)	13.2 (55.8)	17.2 (63.0)	21.3 (70.3)	24.0 (75.2)	23.7 (74.7)	19.7 (67.5)	15.7 (60.3)	10.5 (50.9)	7.2 (45.0)	14.7 (58.5)
Mean daily minimum °C (°F)	1.8 (35.2)	1.9 (35.4)	4.5 (40.1)	7.2 (45.0)	11.0 (51.8)	14.9 (58.8)	17.3 (63.1)	17.1 (62.8)	13.7 (56.7)	10.5 (50.9)	5.9 (42.6)	2.6 (36.7)	9.0 (48.2)
Record low °C (°F)	−14.3 (6.3)	−18.5 (−1.3)	−9.4 (15.1)	−4.3 (24.3)	−0.9 (30.4)	4.2 (39.6)	7.6 (45.7)	7.7 (45.9)	3.1 (37.6)	−3.6 (25.5)	−7.6 (18.3)	−14.4 (6.1)	−18.5 (−1.3)
Average precipitation mm (inches)	54.4 (2.14)	34.2 (1.35)	36.6 (1.44)	56.4 (2.22)	44.0 (1.73)	30.6 (1.20)	13.7 (0.54)	30.5 (1.20)	78.9 (3.11)	85.6 (3.37)	84.1 (3.31)	45.1 (1.78)	594.1 (23.39)
Average precipitation days (≥ 1.0 mm)	5.2	4.8	4.7	6.0	5.2	2.9	1.8	2.9	4.9	6.1	7.0	5.1	56.6
Average snowy days	0.6	0.5	0.2	0.0	0.0	0.0	0.0	0.0	0.0	0.0	0.2	0.9	2.4
Average relative humidity (%)	75	73	68	67	67	65	61	64	72	76	77	77	70.2
Source 1: Meteociel
Source 2: Infoclimat.fr (humidity, snowy days 1961–1990)

== See also ==
- Communes of the Bouches-du-Rhône department
