= Craponne Canal =

Canal in Bouches-du-Rhône, France

Coordinates: 43.661785°N 5.096298°E

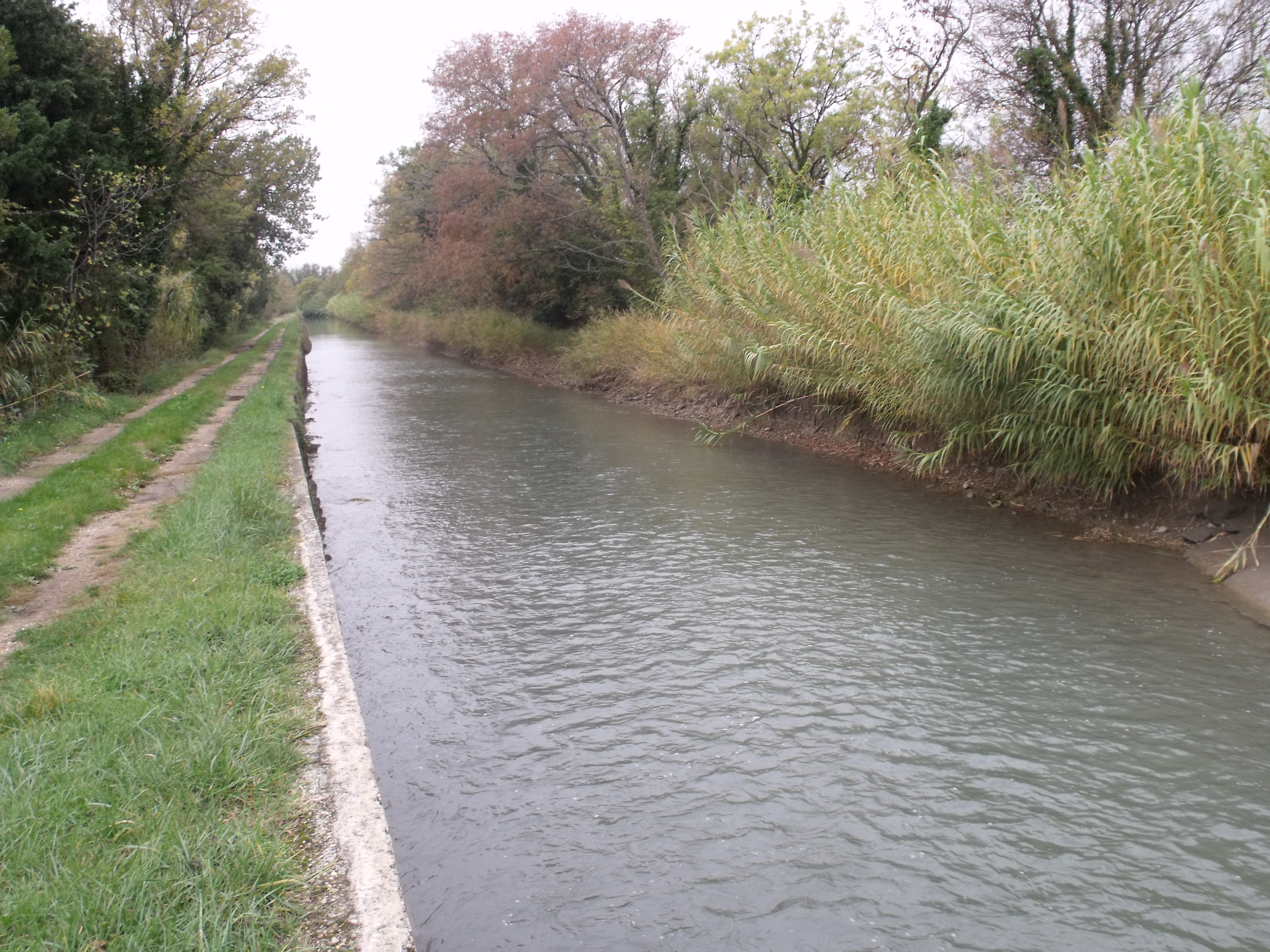
Canal de Craponne

The Canal de Craponne (French pronunciation: [kanal də kʁapɔn], Craponne canal) is a canal in the Pélissanne commune of the Bouches-du-Rhône department of France. It was originally conceived and built between 1554 and 1559 by the engineer Adam de Craponne to bring fresh water 25km from the river Durance at La Roque-d'Anthéron, via Alleins and Lamanon, to Salon-de-Provence and the desertified plain of Crau.

The canal was such a success that it was expanded by Craponne, and was subsequently enhanced and expanded to connect to the river Rhône at Arles and the Etang de Berre, a lagoon on the Mediterranean coast, at Istres.

The canal is now significant in French Contract Law. In 2016 an 1876 decision by the Cour de cassation was over-ruled, such that even a 300-year-old contract (circa 1559) could not be modified to accommodate a change of circumstances whereby it has become wholly unfavourable to one of the parties.

== The Durance to Salon-de-Provence ==
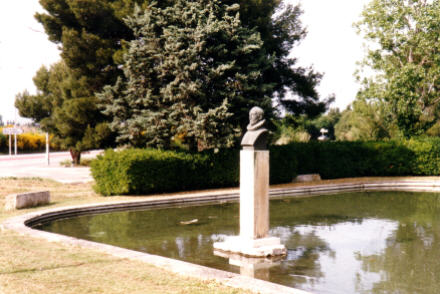
Fountains at Lamanon with a statue of Adam de Craponne

On 17 August 1554 Adam de Craponne obtained a licence to extract water from the river Durance and channel it to Salon-de-Provence. He commenced the task in 1554, starting from the Lower Durance near La Roque-d'Anthéron, from where it followed the south side of the valley and crossed the drainage channel (pertuis) at Lamanon.

By completion in 1559 the canal water supplied the fountains of Salon-de-Provence and began to irrigate the arid soils on the flat alluvial plain of the Crau. The first extension was a sinuous route to the Etang de Berre lagoon at Istres.

The canal project was so successful that it became critical to the local economy, forcing Craponne to several phases of enlargement.

=== Finance ===
Adam de Craponne personally funded the project with the help of private partners such as Nostradamus who, along with his wife Anne Ponsard, acquired a one-thirteenth share in the canal.

== Salon-de-Provence to Arles ==
Adam de Craponne died in 1576, but on May 3 1581 his former colleagues (anniveleurs), the Ravel brothers, obtained a license from the councillors of Arles, enabling them to extend across the plain of Crau. They had requested, and obtained, the support of Robert de Montcalm, councillor of king Henry III of France and president of his court at the Parlement of Aix-en-Provence. De Montcalm used his own money to purchase a two-ninths share of the Arles project on 29 August 1583.

In 1584 the associates built the Pont-de-Crau, a bridge and aqueduct across a fetid, foul-water, swamp south east of Arles. This was a significant cost and was commenced on 22 August 1585. Two consuls of Arles had opposed the project and energised a following among the local population, so De Montcalm called them to appear before the Parliament of Aix in November 1585, but he died on 20 October 1585, before the hearing.

== Contract Law ==
The original investors formally undertook to maintain the canal against a payment of three French sols for every two hectares irrigated by the farmers. Slowly this payment became derisory and out of proportion to the cost of maintenance, so the heirs of Adam de Craponne were granted an increase by the lower court. But in 1876 the farmers sought legal review and the decision of the Court of Appeal of Aix-en-Provence was quashed.

After more than a century of further academic debate, the reform of French contract law (10 February 2016) overruled the Cour de cassation’s infamous decision on Canal de Craponne, according to which even a 300-year-old contract could not be modified to accommodate a change of circumstances that had rendered performance significantly more onerous for one of the parties.

== See also ==
- List of canals in France
- fr: Canal de Craponne (arrêt) - one of the largest judgements of the Court of Cassation.
