= Orus =

Orus may refer to:

== People ==
- Juan Orús Madinyá (1892-1987), Spanish architect
- Orus, also known as Oros of Alexandria
- Orus Jones (1867–1963), American golfer
- Román Orús (born 1979), Spanish theoretical physicist

== Places ==
- Orus, Ariège, France

== Other ==
- Orus (mythology), characters in Greek mythology
- 21900 Orus, minor planet
- Lycaena orus, butterfly of the family Lycaenidae
- Orus (1842 ship), American steamship
- Orus Apollo, manuscript written by Nostradamus in 1555
