= Theophilus de Garencières =

French physician

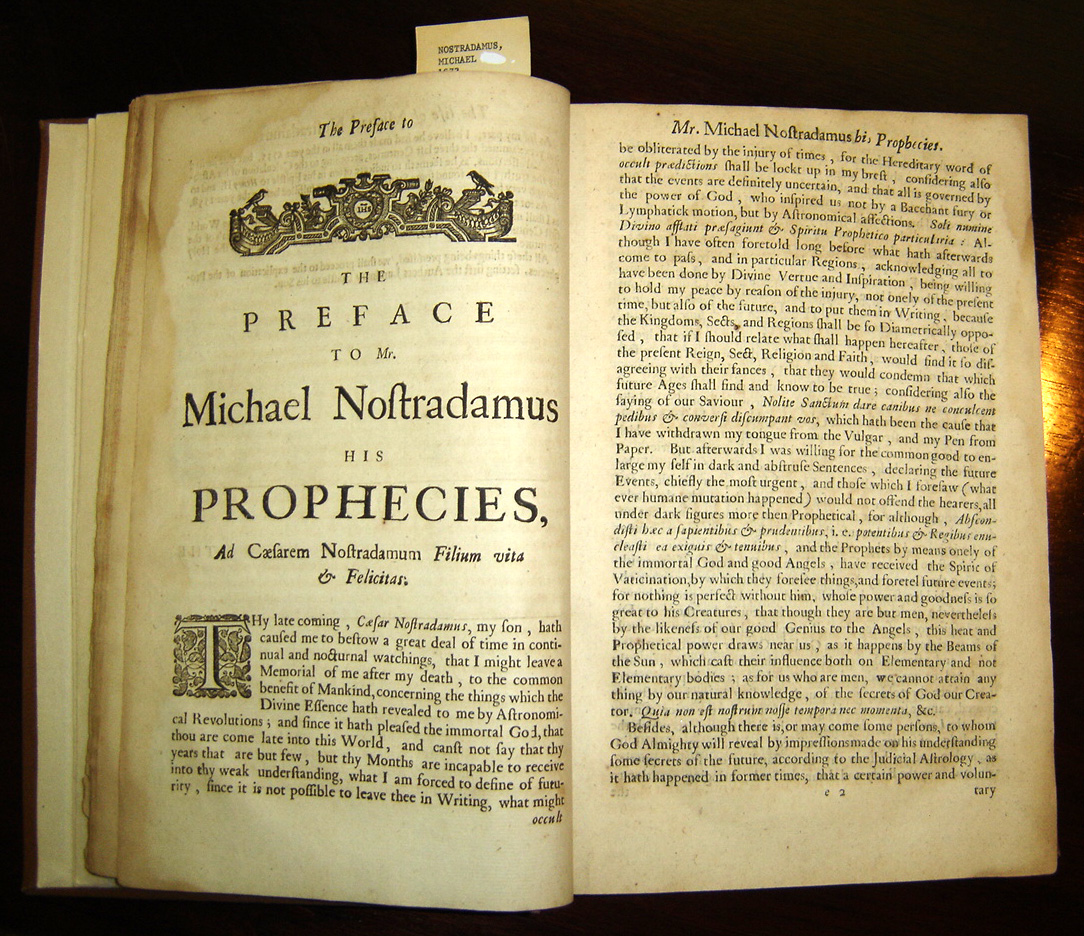
Garencières' 1672 translation of Nostradamus

Theophilus de Garencières (c. 1610 – c. 1677) was a French physician who spent most of his life practising in England. He wrote Angliae Flagellum (1647), a Latin treatise on consumption (tuberculosis) that held sugar to be a major cause of the disease in England, and a short work on the plague during the Great Plague of 1665. In 1672 he published the first English translation of the prophecies of Nostradamus.

== Early life and education ==
Born in Paris, Garencières stated that he had learned to read from the prophecies of Nostradamus. In the preface to his 1672 translation he said the book "was the first after my Primmer, wherein I did learn to read, it being then the Custom in France, about the year 1618, to initiate Children by that Book", and that he had "from my youth been conversant with those that pretended or endeavered to know something in it". He studied at the University of Caen, which granted him a Doctorate of Medicine on 27 October 1634.

== Career in London ==
By 1645 he was living in Long Acre, in the parish of St Martin-in-the-Fields, Westminster. The parish poor rate books list "Theophilus Gransheere" under "Longacre Southside att the East end" in 1645, and "Mons[ieu]r De Garansire" under "Long acre South" in 1647.

In 1647 Garencières published Angliae Flagellum seu Tabes Anglica ("The Scourge of England, or the English Consumption"), a Latin treatise on consumption, with a preface addressed to the royal physician Sir Theodore de Mayerne. He held that sugar and all sugared foods were especially harmful in the disease and did much to cause it, and that because the English ate them so often it was no wonder that "such a crop of consumptives" (tanta tabidorum seges) sprang up there. He expected readers to find this a paradox, since sugar was thought almost necessary to life. He argued that sugar's ruling quality was a hidden heat, shown by the thirst it caused, by the light that a knife struck from it in the dark, and by its turning bitter when boiled long, and that this heat inflamed the lungs. In 1648 Samuel Hartlib noted in his diary that the book was "very much commended", and that "the great cause alledged by him is the immoderate vse of eating of sugar".

By the 1650s, he was domestic physician to the French ambassador in London. He belonged to the French congregation that Jean d'Espagne had gathered in Westminster, whose members included physicians to upper-class society such as Sir Theodore de Mayerne and John Colladon. On 28 June 1655 he was made a denizen, one of a group of aliens named in a single patent, as "Theophile de Garancieres, of the city of Westminster, Doctor of Phisick". On 10 March 1657 (1656/7 in the Old Style calendar) the University of Oxford incorporated his Caen doctorate, on testimonial letters from the ambassador and, according to Anthony Wood, on account of "his late relinquishing the Rom. church, and zeal for that of the reformed". The Royal College of Physicians examined him in December 1656 and in January and February 1657, and on 23 March 1657 (1656/7) admitted him a Candidate of the College. According to Robin Gwynn, he was one of only three members who seem to have left the French church of London for disciplinary reasons in the decade after the Restoration, in his case in 1662. In the 1660s and 1670s he lived in Clerkenwell Close, Clerkenwell.

During the Great Plague of 1665, Garencières published A Mite Cast into the Treasury of the Famous City of London, a short discourse on the plague "digested into aphorismes" and dedicated to the Lord Mayor, Sir John Lawrence. He wrote that the plague was "one of the easiest diseases in the world to be cured, if it be taken within four hours after the first invasion", and that if people kept to this rule he would undertake, "by the grace of the Almighty", to "cure nineteen of twenty". He signed the work "From my House in Clerkenwell Close, near the Church, the 14. day of Septemb. 1665". A second edition, "Revised and Enlarged by the Author", followed the same year, and a third in 1666. Joseph Frank Payne later observed that Garencières dated the pamphlet "when the deaths were nearly 7,000 a week", and grouped it with Gideon Harvey's plague discourse as "trivial catch-penny publications, intended to recommend the writers to practice". The apothecary William Boghurst, writing in 1666, counted it among the books that "spoke nothing from experience", and doubted that anyone could "cure 19 of 20 only with sweating reiterated or by taking of Venice Treacle".

In 1670, Garencières translated The famous conclave: wherein Clement VIII was elected Pope, with the intrigues and cunning devices of that ecclesiastical assembly: faithfully translated out of an Italian manuscript found in one of the cardinals studies after his death, an account of the election of Pope Clement VIII. He signed its dedication and wrote that he claimed nothing in the work "but the changing of its Italian Habit into an English Dress".

In 1676, Garencières published The Admirable Virtues, And Wonderful Effects Of The True And Genuine Tincture Of Coral, In Physick. In Clerkenwell he knew Thomas Britton, the "small-coal man" later famous for his concerts. According to Thomas Hearne, Britton "became acquainted with Dr. Garenciers, his near Neighbour, by which means he became an excellent Chymist", and worked with "a moving Elaboratory, that was contrived and built by himself". In 1655 Samuel Hartlib recorded the opinion of his informant Frederick Clodius that Bassett Jones, author of a treatise on the philosopher's stone, had gone "further then Garancier" in that work.

== Translation of Nostradamus ==
In 1672, Garencières was the first to translate Nostradamus into English, creating the bilingual text The true prophecies or prognostications of Michel Nostradamus. However, Garencières unknowingly used a fake edition of Nostradamus’s work, printed in Paris in 1649 but dated Lyon 1568, which contained quatrains that were forged in order to discredit and foretell the downfall of Cardinal Jules Mazarin, prime minister of France.

In 1681, nine years after it was published, Garencières's translation was the stated source of a pamphlet by "J. B. Philalelos", Good and Joyful News for England, which presented a prophecy that Charles II would have a son "lawfully begotten" to succeed him, "as it was taken out of the Translations of Dr. Theo. Garencieres, M. D. Col. Lond. Printed 1672. in Fol." In 1863 F. Buget, writing in the Bulletin du bibliophile, described the translator as a French physician settled in London. He found that most of the preface, and the life and apology of Nostradamus, had been translated from the French commentator Jaubert without naming him, and that the longer notes on the quatrains were usually drawn from Jaubert as well. He also wrote that the French text, taken from the 1649 Paris edition, was full of errors because Garencières had almost always been away while it was being printed. Charles A. Ward's Oracles of Nostradamus (1891) drew in part on Garencières's translation, and in 1947 the New York book dealer Henry C. Roberts published what Edgar Leoni called "essentially a reprint" of it, "with occasional risible deviations". Leoni described the 1672 work as "the first and last translation till 1947 of all the quatrains", with a "poor French text and very superficial translation".

== Family and death ==
Among the commendatory verses in his 1672 Nostradamus is a Latin couplet signed "Petrus", which says the prophecies of Nostradamus will live "and those of my father" (& Patris illa mei), and a quatrain signed "Dudleyus". On 3 May 1678 Peter de Garencières "of St Margaret's, Westminster, Gent." made the sworn allegation for the marriage of Dudley de Garencières, aged 27, and Elizabeth Barker, a half-sister of John Vanbrugh. Dudley, a King's Scholar of Westminster School from 1667, became rector of Waverton, Cheshire, and in 1696 a prebendary of Chester Cathedral. C. B. Norcliffe thought it "probable" that Dudley was the physician's son, and Kerry Downes found the connection "reasonable to suppose". Dudley's son, the Rev. Theophilus Garencières, became vicar of Scarborough. According to Robert Skaife, it is probable that the vicar's eldest son Theophilus, an apothecary in York, was the physician's great-grandson.

Anthony Wood recorded that Garencières "died poor and in an obscure condition in Covent garden" but did not know when; the Royal College of Physicians gives the year of his death as 1677. The burial register of St James, Clerkenwell records the burial on 23 January 1677 (1676/7) of "Theophilus Gallemsere, an antient Inhabytant".
