= Roger Frontenac =

French writer and cryptographer

Roger Frontenac (fl. 1950) was a French navy officer and a scholar of Nostradamus' prophecies. He proposed an interpretation system for the text of Les Prophéties, based upon a form of cryptography known as the Vigenère table.

== Biography ==
Roger Frontenac, as a navy officer, was in charge of military ciphers. After World War II, he began to study the work of Nostradamus, treating it as any other message from an enemy. He searched for any hint about decoding methods. The name of Nostradamus' son Cesar led Frontenac to suspect the use of a Caesar cipher.

== La clef secrète de Nostradamus ==
He published his treatise about Nostradamus' letters and works, La clef secrète de Nostradamus ('The Secret Key of Nostradamus'), in 1950. In the book, Frontenac professed his belief in Nostradamus as a true prophet, who made correct foretellings, and that the centuries (French: Les Prophéties) contained true predictions about future events until the year 3797.

However, Frontenac contended that those predictions were hidden, mixed, and not understandable before the events occurred. His conclusions were based on a combination of several cryptographic methods, including a systematic alteration in the metrical order of quatrains' texts. This process was inspired by Nostradamus' use of the expression rabouter obscurément ('to mix in order to make them obscure') in a letter.

The systematic reordering of quatrains, according to Frontenac, could be achieved using a couple of combined keys, and he stated that he managed to find the first key (a typical Vigenère text, easy to hold in memory), that was the Latin phrase:

Flamen fidele coegi id vulgo a Kabalo
opplevi in viva acta tam latenter densa
ex HDMP fata hac cult sunt ob gratiae
fidos Nostradamus fas obturavit a saxo

— Latin text derived from cryptography by R. Frontenac

Loyal and inspired by the flame (of the Flamini priests),
I conceived and gathered what ordinary people call Kabbalò.
I had hidden it, in living documents (Magical Actas), that are extremely condensed.
The facts of destiny are in this way obscured, using the "HDMP" [perhaps the number 841216.]
For those who believe in Divine Grace, Nostradamus has enclosed it in (or behind) a stone.

— Translation by Maurice Garçon

== See also ==
- Cryptography
- Kabbalah
- Nostradamus
- Prophecy
- Vaticinia Nostradami
- Vigenère cypher

== Bibliography ==
- Frontenac, Roger, La clef secrète de Nostradamus, Les Editions Denoel, Paris 1950
