= Erika Cheetham =

Nostradamian scholar

- Born: 7 July 1939; London, England
- Died: 3 May 1998 (aged 58); London, England
- Other name: Erika McMahon-Turner
- Occupations: Writer, linguist, medieval scholar
- Children: 1

Erika Cheetham (7 July 1939 – 3 May 1998) was an English writer, best known for her controversial interpretations of Nostradamus' writings.

== Early life ==
Cheetham was born Erica Christine Elizabeth Turner in London. Her parents enrolled her in a convent school, from which she was expelled for positing the non-existence of God. Later while attending St Anne's College, Oxford, she married James Nicolas Milne Cheetham.

After earning her doctorate (in medieval language) at Oxford she worked as a staff writer for the Daily Mail, a London tabloid. She began translating Les Prophéties de M. Nostradamus in 1963, which culminated in the publication of her first book The Prophecies of Nostradamus: The Man Who Saw Tomorrow in 1965. This was the basis for the 1980 film of the same title.

== Positions on specific prophecies ==
=== "Angolmois" ===
Prophéties 10:72 is one of Nostradamus' most infamous quatrains:

L'an mil neuf cens nonante neuf sept mois,
Du ciel viendra vn grand Roy d'effrayeur:
Resusciter le grand Roy d'Angolmois,
Avant que Mars regner par bonheur.

Cheetham interpreted Angolmois as a cryptic anagram for "Mongols", predicting the rise (circa mid-1999) of an Antichrist—ostensibly the third such figure (after Napoleon and Hitler)—a tyrant ("king of terror") of Genghis Khan's calibre. However, other scholars have argued that this is merely a variant spelling of Angoumois, a province of western France now known as Charente, and that d'effrayeur was actually supposed to be deffraieur, i.e. one given to appeasement.

=== "Samarobryn" ===
The first word of the third line of Prophéties 6:5 has been variously interpreted as a reference to the USS. Sam Rayburn, a ballistic missile submarine, or even to individual SAMs, i.e. surface-to-air missiles:

Si grand Famine par unde pestifere.
Par pluye longue le long du polle arctique:
Samarobryn cent lieux de l'hemisphere,
Vivront sans loy exempt de pollitique.

However, Cheetham dissents again from other Nostradamian scholars—and from herself—by proposing that Nostradamus derived the word samarobryn either:

- From the Russian words само and робрин—meaning something to the tune of "self-operated", i.e. a self-operating machine in space, 100 leagues from the hemisphere (or atmosphere), "living without law [and] exempt from politics", or:
- From the trade names of wonder-drugs Suramin and Ribavirin. Pondered Cheetham: "Perhaps the remedy for AIDS will be produced in a sterile laboratory circling the Earth?"

=== "Pau, Nay, Loron" ===
Cheetham cited quatrains 1:60 and 8:1 of Nostradamus' Prophéties as a cryptic reference to Napoleon Bonaparte.

Un Empereur naistra pres d'Italie,
Qui à l'Empire sera vendu bien cher,
Diront avec quels gens il se ralie
Qu'on trouvera moins prince que boucher.

PAU, NAY, LORON plus feu qu'a sang sera,
Laude nager, fuir grand aux surrez:
Les agassas entree refusera,
Pampon, Durance les tiendra enferrez.

Whilst the uppercase letters (preserved from Nostradamus' original) may suggest a deeper meaning, sceptics will note the mutual proximity of the Aquitainian villages Pau, Nay, and Oloron (in southwestern France), which form a small triangle not 70 kilometres (43 mi) about. Though more esoteric interpretations have pegged this region "more fire than blood" as a future nuclear waste site, Cheetham's observation was that the capitalised letters can be arranged to spell something like "NAYPAULORON", i.e. Napoleon. Singer-songwriter and hist-rock pioneer Al Stewart also favoured this interpretation in his 1974 song "Nostradamus", wherein he deliberately pronounces and spells Bonaparte's name in a similar idiosyncratic manner.

An emperor of France shall rise who will be born near Italy
His rule cost his empire dear, Napoloron [sic] his name shall be

=== "Hister" ===
Prophéties 2:24:

Bestes farouches de faim fleuves tranner :
Plus part du champ encontre Hister sera,
En caige de fer le grand fera treisner,
Quand rien enfant de Germain observera.

Cheetham interpreted this as a reference to Adolf Hitler, the "child of Germany [who] obeys [no law]". This conclusion disregards Hitler's Austrian heritage and the Latin use of Hister (derived from the Milesian–Greek settlement of Histria in ancient Thrace, and in turn from the Scythian river-god Ίστρος/Istros) to refer to the Lower Danube. Nonetheless this too is preserved in Stewart's lyrics:

One named Hister shall become a captain of Greater Germany
No Law does this man observe and bloody his rise and fall shall be

=== Israel ===
Prophéties 3:97:

Nouvelle loy terre neufve occuper,
Vers la Syrie, Judée et Palestine:
Le grand empire barbare corruer,
Avant que Phoebus son siecle determine.

This prophecy, according to Cheetham, predicts the establishment of the modern State of Israel.

== Bibliography ==
- Cheetham, Erika (1965). The Prophecies of Nostradamus: The Man Who Saw Tomorrow. Corgi Books. ISBN 0-399-50345-5.
- Cheetham, Erika (1985). The Further Prophecies of Nostradamus: 1985 and Beyond. Perigee Press. ISBN 0-399-51121-0.
- Cheetham, Erika (1989). The Final Prophecies of Nostradamus. Perigee Press. ISBN 0-399-51516-X.
