= Jean de Nostredame =

French historian (1522–1576/7)

Jean de Nostredame (1522–1576/7) was a Provençal historian and writer. He was the younger brother of Michel de Nostredame.

He was baptised at Saint-Rémy-de-Provence on 19 February 1522. He followed the footsteps of his father, Jaume de Nostredame, as a notary public and served as a procurator of the Cour de Parlement of Provence in Aix.

Nostredame's major work is Les vies des plus célèbres et anciens Poètes provensaux, qui ont floury du temps des comtes de Provence (Lyon: Alexandre Marsilij, 1575). It presents itself as a history of the troubadours. Today it is regarded as largely fantasy, though nuggets of historical truth remain. Nostredame lists three sources for his accounts, but none of these survive. In the eighteenth century Giovanni Mario Crescimbeni was influenced by Nostredame, but in the twentieth, Camille Chabaneau and Joseph Anglade showed definitively that most of Nostredame cannot be corroborated.
