= Nostradamus =

French astrologer and seer (1503–1566)

Michel de Nostredame
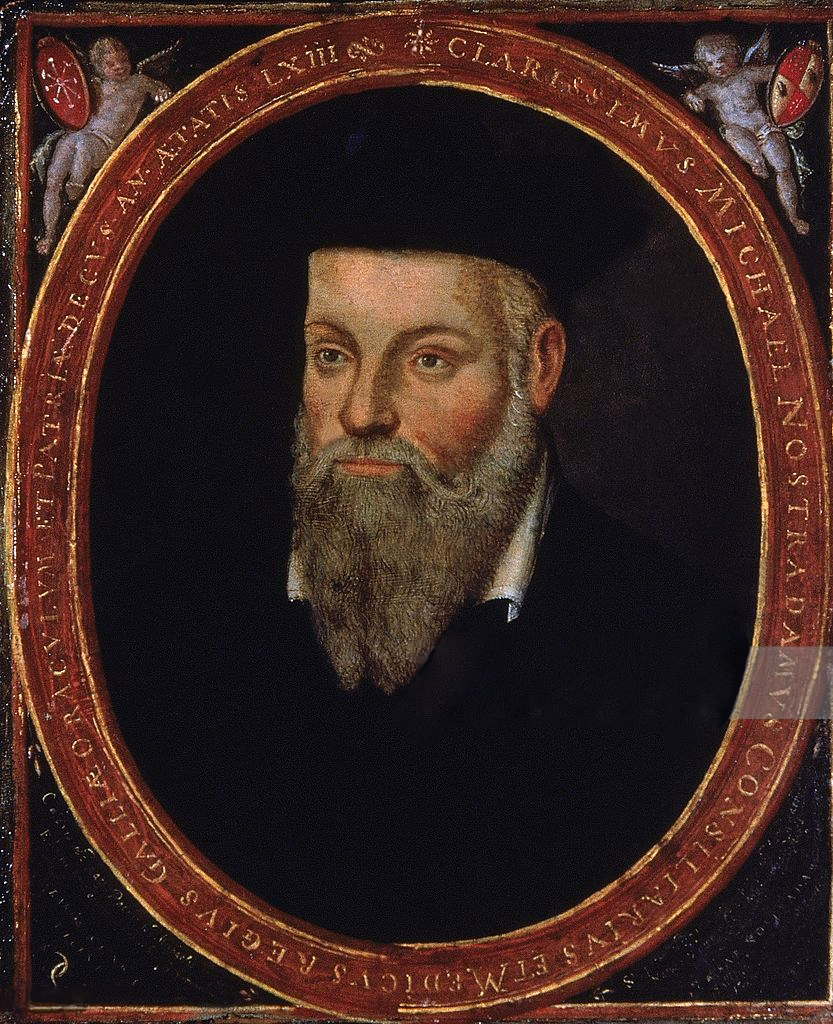
- Portrait by his son César, c. 1614, nearly fifty years after his death
- Born: 14 or 21 December 1503; Saint-Rémy-de-Provence, Provence, France
- Died: 1 or 2 July 1566 (aged 62); Salon-de-Provence, Provence, France
- Occupations: Physician; apothecary; author; translator; astrological consultant
- Known for: Prophecy, treating plague
- Notable work: Les Prophéties

Michel de Nostredame (December 1503 – July 1566), usually Latinised as Nostradamus, (Note: /ˌnɒstrəˈdɑːməs, -ˈdeɪm-/ NOS-trə-DAH-məs, -DAY-, also US: /ˌnoʊs-/ NOHS-) was a French astrologer, apothecary, physician, and reputed seer, who is best known for his book Les Prophéties (published in 1555), a collection of 942 (Note: The original edition of Nostradamus's Les Prophéties from 1555 contained only 353 quatrains. More were later added, amounting to 942 in an omnibus edition published after his death, organized into ten "Centuries", each one containing one hundred quatrains, except for Century VII, which, for unknown reasons, only contains forty-two; the other fifty-eight may have been lost due to a problem during publication. See Works section below.) poetic quatrains allegedly predicting future events.

Nostradamus's father's family had originally been Jewish, but had converted to Catholic Christianity a generation before Nostradamus was born. He studied at the University of Avignon, but was forced to leave after just over a year when the university closed due to an outbreak of the plague. He worked as an apothecary for several years before entering the University of Montpellier, hoping to earn a doctorate, but was almost immediately expelled after his work as an apothecary (a manual trade forbidden by university statutes) was discovered. He first married in 1531, but his wife and two children died in 1534 during another plague outbreak. He worked against the plague alongside other doctors before remarrying to Anne Ponsarde, with whom he had six children. He wrote an almanac for 1550 and, as a result of its success, continued writing them for future years as he began working as an astrologer for various wealthy patrons. Catherine de' Medici became one of his foremost supporters. His Les Prophéties, published in 1555, relied heavily on historical and literary precedent, and initially received mixed reception. He suffered from severe gout toward the end of his life, which eventually developed into edema. He died on 1 or 2 July 1566. Many popular authors have retold apocryphal legends about his life.

In the years since the publication of his Les Prophéties, Nostradamus has attracted many supporters, who, along with some of the popular press, credit him with having accurately predicted many major world events. Academic sources reject the notion that Nostradamus had any genuine supernatural prophetic abilities and maintain that the associations made between world events and Nostradamus's quatrains are the result of (sometimes deliberate) misinterpretations or mistranslations. These academics also argue that Nostradamus's predictions are characteristically vague, meaning they could be applied to virtually anything, and are useless for determining whether their author had any real prophetic powers.

== Life ==
=== Childhood ===
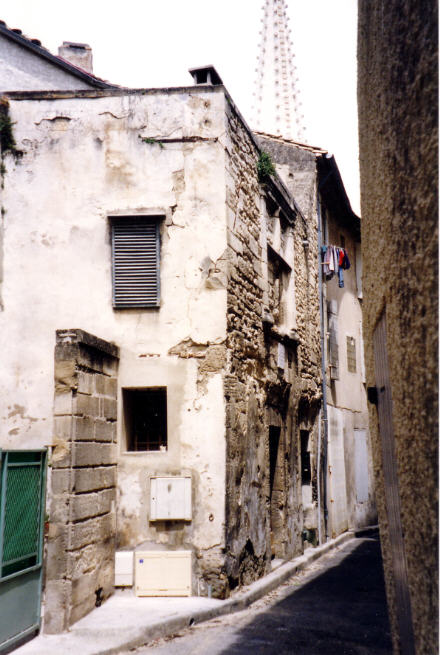
Nostradamus's claimed birthplace, Saint-Rémy-de-Provence, photographed in 1997

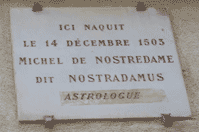
Municipal plaque on the claimed birthplace of Nostradamus in St-Rémy, France, describing him as an 'astrologer' and giving his birth-date as 14 December 1503 (Julian calendar)

Nostradamus was born on either 14 or 21 December 1503 in Saint-Rémy-de-Provence, Provence, France, where his claimed birthplace still exists, and baptized Michel. He was one of at least nine children of notary Jaume (or Jacques) de Nostredame and Reynière, granddaughter of Pierre de Saint-Rémy, who worked as a physician in Saint-Rémy. Jaume's family had originally been Jewish. His father, Cresquas, a grain and money dealer based in Avignon, had converted to Catholicism around 1459–60, taking the Christian name "Pierre" and the surname "Nostredame" (Our Lady), the saint on whose day his conversion was solemnised. The earliest ancestor who can be identified on the paternal side is Astruge of Carcassonne, who died about 1420. Michel's known siblings included Delphine, Jean (c. 1507–1577), Pierre, Hector, Louis, Bertrand, Jean II (born 1522), and Antoine (born 1523). Little else is known about his childhood, although there is a persistent tradition that he was educated by his maternal great-grandfather Jean de St. Rémy—a tradition which is somewhat undermined by the fact that the latter disappears from the historical record after 1504 when the child was only one year old.

=== Student years ===
At the age of 14, Nostradamus entered the University of Avignon to study for his baccalaureate. After little more than a year (when he would have studied the regular trivium of grammar, rhetoric and logic rather than the more advanced quadrivium of geometry, arithmetic, music, and astronomy/astrology), he was forced to leave Avignon when the university closed its doors during an outbreak of the plague. After leaving Avignon, Nostradamus, by his own account, traveled the countryside for eight years from 1521 researching herbal remedies. In 1529, after some years as an apothecary, he entered the University of Montpellier to study for a doctorate in medicine. He was expelled shortly afterwards by the student procurator, Guillaume Rondelet, when it was discovered that he had been an apothecary, a "manual trade" expressly banned by the university statutes, and had been slandering doctors. The expulsion document, BIU Montpellier, Register S 2 folio 87, still exists in the faculty library. Some of his publishers and correspondents would later call him "Doctor". After his expulsion, Nostradamus continued working, presumably still as an apothecary, and became famous for creating a "rose pill" that purportedly protected against the plague.

=== Marriage and healing work ===
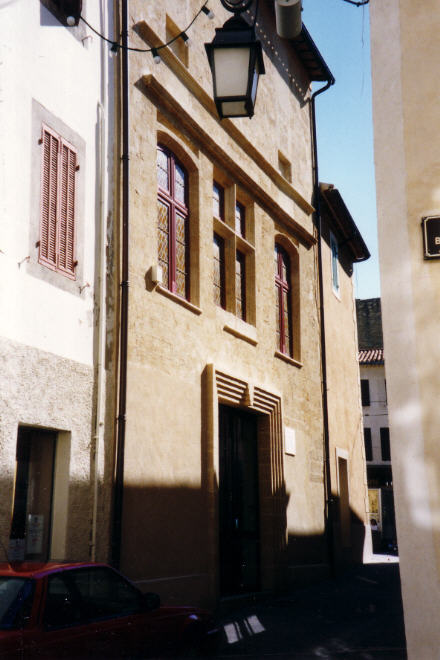
Nostradamus's house at Salon-de-Provence, as reconstructed after the 1909 Provence earthquake

In 1531, Nostradamus was invited by Jules-César Scaliger, a leading Renaissance scholar, to come to Agen. There he married a woman of uncertain name (possibly Henriette d'Encausse), with whom he had two children. In 1534, his wife and children died, presumably from the plague. After their deaths, he continued to travel, passing through France and possibly Italy.

On his return in 1545, he assisted the prominent physician Louis Serre in his fight against a major plague outbreak in Marseille, and then tackled further outbreaks of disease on his own in Salon-de-Provence and in the regional capital, Aix-en-Provence. Finally, in 1547, he settled in Salon-de-Provence in the house which exists today, where he married a rich widow named Anne Ponsarde, with whom he had six children—three daughters and three sons. Between 1556 and 1567, he and his wife acquired a one-thirteenth share in a huge canal project, organised by Adam de Craponne, to create the Canal de Craponne to irrigate the largely waterless Salon-de-Provence and the nearby Désert de la Crau from the river Durance.

=== Occultism ===
After another visit to Italy, Nostradamus began to move away from medicine and toward the "occult". Following popular trends, he wrote an almanac for 1550, for the first time in print Latinising his name to Nostradamus. He was so encouraged by the almanac's success that he decided to write one or more annually. Taken together, they are known to have contained at least 6,338 prophecies, as well as at least eleven annual calendars, all of them starting on 1 January and not, as is sometimes supposed, in March. It was mainly in response to the almanacs that the nobility and other prominent people from far away soon started asking for horoscopes and "psychic" advice from him, though he generally expected his clients to supply the birth charts on which these would be based, rather than calculating them himself as a professional astrologer would have done. When obliged to attempt this himself based on the published tables of the day, he frequently made errors and failed to adjust the figures for his clients' place or time of birth. (Note: Refer to the analysis of these charts by Brind'Amour, 1993, and compare Gruber's comprehensive critique of Nostradamus's horoscope for Crown Prince Rudolph Maximilian.)

He then began his project of writing a book of one thousand mainly French quatrains, which constitute the largely undated prophecies for which he is most famous today. Feeling vulnerable to opposition on religious grounds, he devised a method of obscuring his meaning by using "Virgilianised" syntax, word games and a mixture of other languages such as Greek, Italian, Latin, and Provençal. For technical reasons connected with their publication in three instalments (the publisher of the third and last instalment seems to have been unwilling to start it in the middle of a "Century," or book of 100 verses), the last fifty-eight quatrains of the seventh "Century" have not survived in any extant edition.

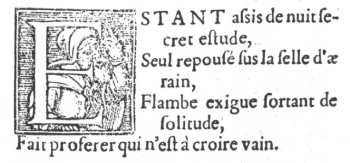
Century I, Quatrain 1 in the 1555 Lyon Bonhomme edition

The quatrains, published in a book titled Les Prophéties (The Prophecies), received a mixed reaction. Some people thought Nostradamus was a servant of evil, a fake, or insane, while many of the elite evidently thought otherwise. Catherine de' Medici, wife of King Henry II of France, was one of Nostradamus's greatest admirers. After reading his almanacs for 1555, which hinted at unnamed threats to the royal family, she summoned him to Paris to explain them and to draw up horoscopes for her children. At the time, he feared that he would be beheaded, but by the time of his death in 1566, Queen Catherine had made him Counselor and Physician-in-Ordinary to her son, the young King Charles IX of France.

Some accounts of Nostradamus's life state that he was afraid of being persecuted for heresy by the Inquisition, but neither prophecy nor astrology fell in this bracket, and he would have been in danger only if he had practised magic to support them. In 1538, he came into conflict with the Church in Agen after an Inquisitor visited the area looking for anti-Catholic views. His brief imprisonment at Marignane in late 1561 was because he had violated a recent royal decree by publishing his 1562 almanac without the prior permission of a bishop.

=== Final years and death ===
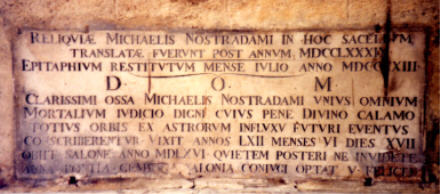
Nostradamus's current tomb in the Collégiale Saint-Laurent in Salon-de-Provence in the south of France, into which his scattered remains were transferred after 1789

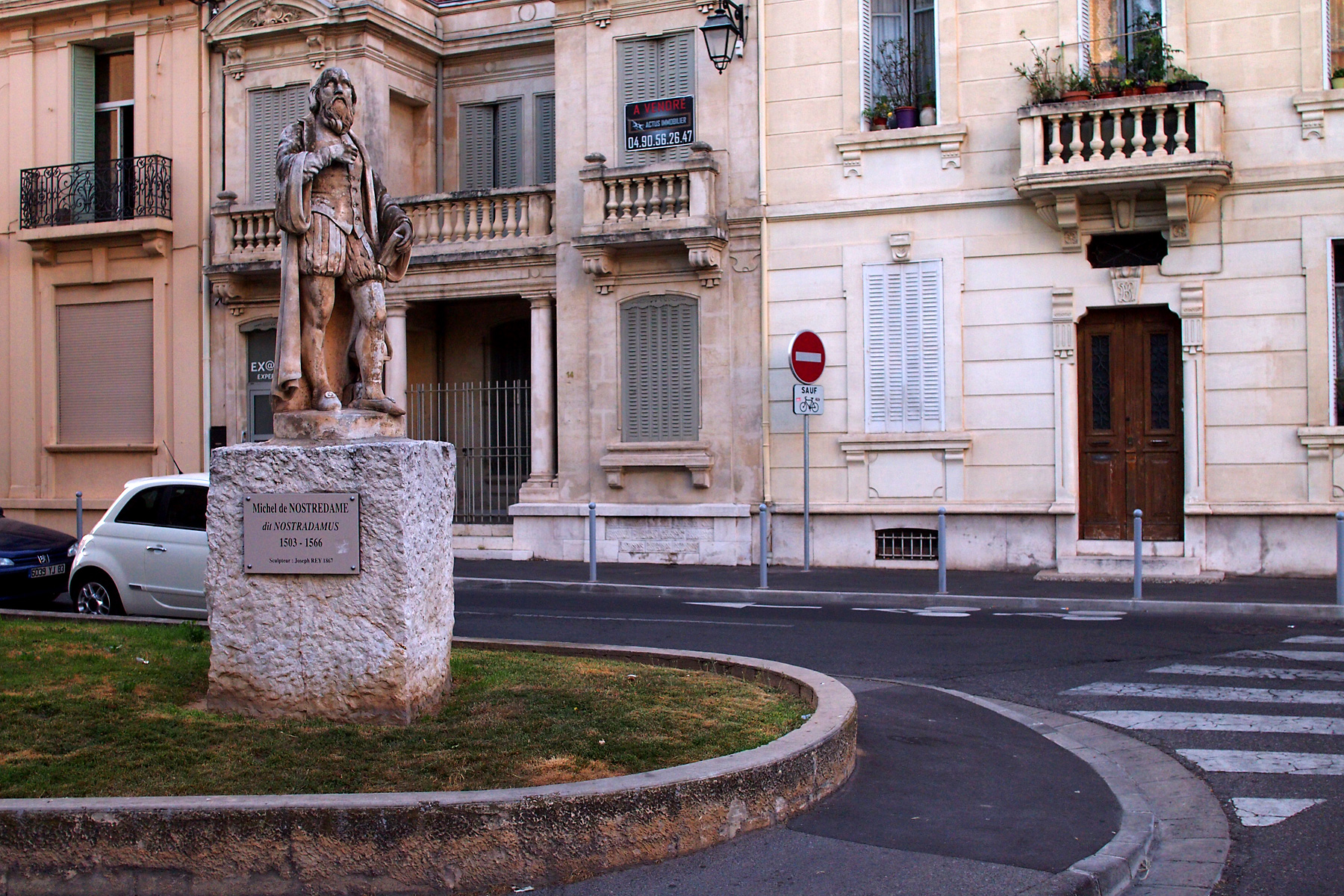
Nostradamus statue in Salon-de-Provence

By 1566, Nostradamus' gout, which had plagued him painfully for many years and made movement very difficult, turned into edema. In late June, he summoned his lawyer to draw up an extensive will bequeathing his property plus 3,444 crowns (around US$300,000 today), minus a few debts, to his wife pending her remarriage, in trust for her sons pending their twenty-fifth birthdays and her daughters pending their marriages. This was followed by a much shorter codicil. On the evening of 1 July, he is alleged to have told his secretary Jean de Chavigny, "You will not find me alive at sunrise." As he predicted, the next morning, he was reportedly found dead, lying on the floor next to his bed and a bench (Presage 141 [originally 152] for November 1567, as posthumously edited by Chavigny to fit what happened). He was buried in the local Franciscan chapel in Salon (part of it now incorporated into the restaurant La Brocherie) but re-interred during the French Revolution in the Collégiale Saint-Laurent, where his tomb remains to this day.

== Works ==
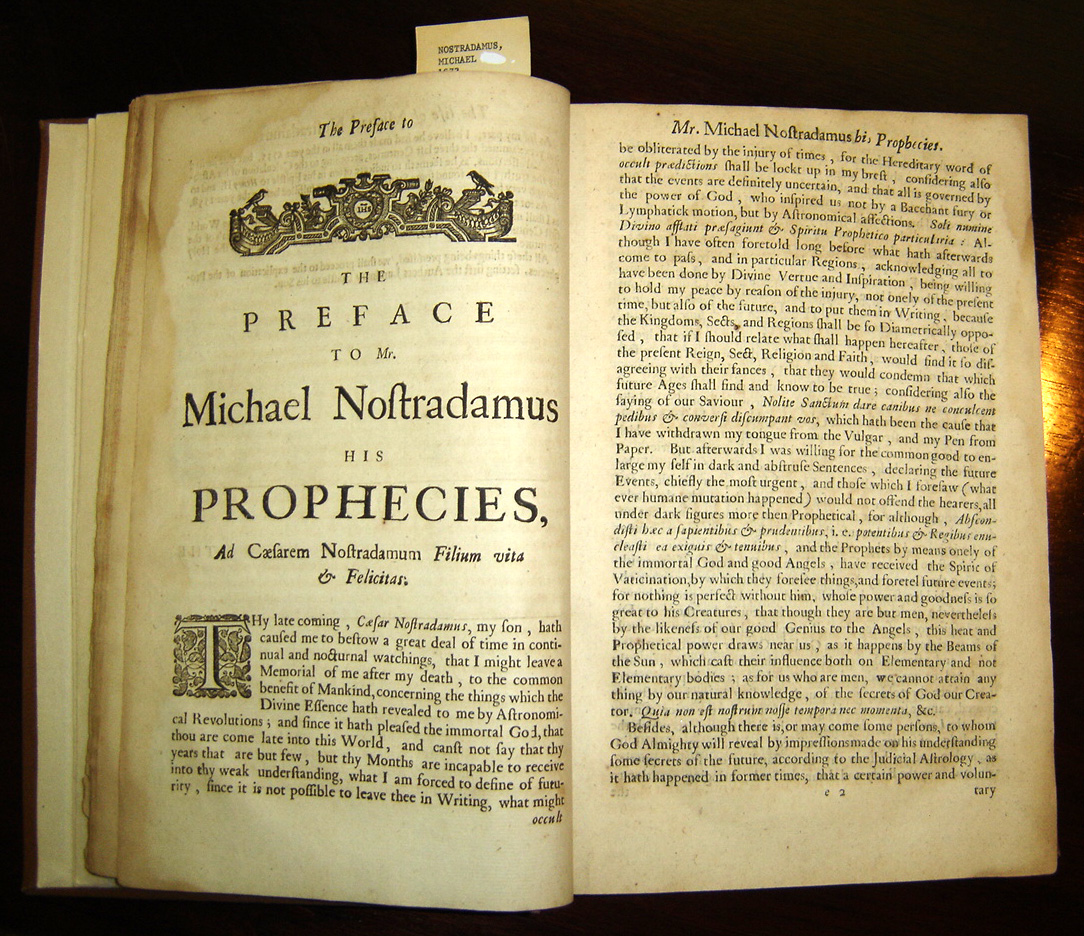
Copy of Garencières' 1672 English translation of the Prophecies, located in The P.I. Nixon Medical History Library of The University of Texas Health Science Center at San Antonio

In The Prophecies Nostradamus compiled his collection of major, long-term predictions. The first installment was published in 1555 and contained 353 quatrains. The third edition, with three hundred new quatrains, was reportedly printed in 1558, but now survives as only part of the omnibus edition that was published after his death in 1568. This version contains one unrhymed and 941 rhymed quatrains, grouped into nine sets of 100 and one of 42, called "Centuries".

Given printing practices at the time (which included type-setting from dictation), no two editions turned out to be identical, and it is relatively rare to find even two copies that are exactly the same. No proof exists that either the spellings or the punctuation of any edition are Nostradamus's originals.

The Almanacs, by far the most popular of his works, were published annually from 1550 until his death. He often published two or three in a year, entitled either Almanachs (detailed predictions), Prognostications or Presages (more generalised predictions).

Nostradamus was not only a diviner, but a professional healer. It is known that he wrote at least two books on medical science. One was an extremely free translation (or rather a paraphrase) of The Protreptic of Galen (Paraphrase de C. GALIEN, sus l'Exhortation de Menodote aux estudes des bonnes Artz, mesmement Medicine), and in his so-called Traité des fardemens (basically a medical cookbook containing, once again, materials borrowed mainly from others), he included a description of the methods he used to treat the plague, including bloodletting, none of which apparently worked. The same book also describes the preparation of cosmetics.

A manuscript normally known as the Orus Apollo also exists in the Lyon municipal library, where upwards of 2,000 original documents relating to Nostradamus are stored under the aegis of Michel Chomarat. It is a purported translation of an ancient Greek work on Egyptian hieroglyphs based on later Latin versions, all of them unfortunately ignorant of the true meanings of the ancient Egyptian script, which was not correctly deciphered until Champollion in the 19th century.

Since his death, only the Prophecies have continued to be popular, but in this case, they have been quite extraordinarily so. Over two hundred editions of them have appeared in that time, together with over 2,000 commentaries. Their persistence in popular culture seems to be partly because their vagueness and lack of dating make it easy to quote them selectively after every major dramatic event and retrospectively claim them as "hits".

== Origins of The Prophecies ==
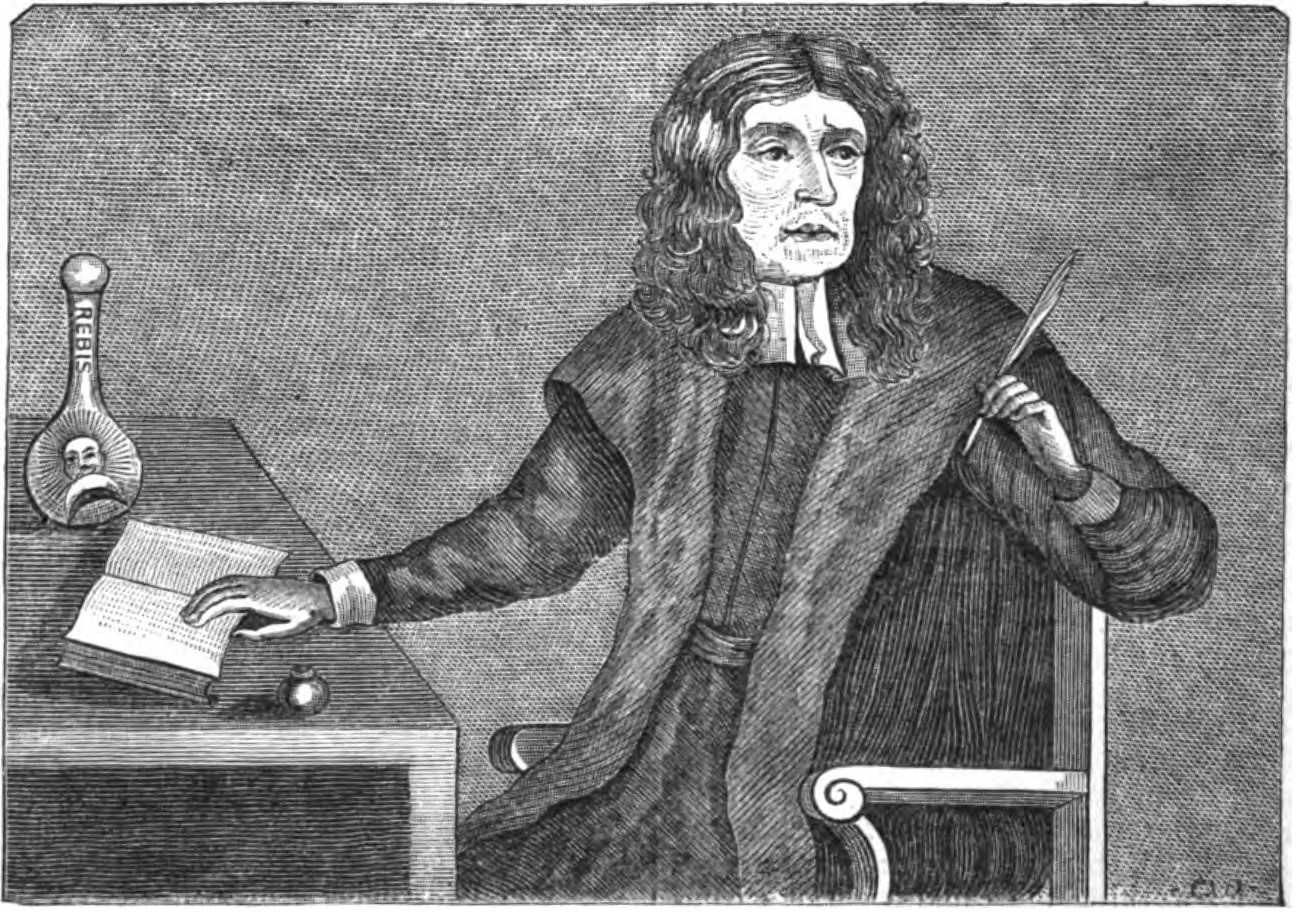
Theophilus de Garencières, the first English translator of the Prophecies

Nostradamus claimed to base his published predictions on judicial astrology—the astrological 'judgment', or assessment, of the 'quality' (and thus potential) of events such as births, weddings, coronations etc.—but was heavily criticised by professional astrologers of the day such as Laurens Videl for incompetence and for assuming that "comparative horoscopy" (the comparison of future planetary configurations with those accompanying known past events) could actually predict what would happen in the future.

Research suggests that much of his prophetic work paraphrases collections of ancient end-of-the-world prophecies (mainly Bible-based), supplemented with references to historical events and anthologies of omen reports, and then projects those into the future in part with the aid of comparative horoscopy. Hence the many predictions involving ancient figures such as Sulla, Gaius Marius, Nero, and others, as well as his descriptions of "battles in the clouds" and "frogs falling from the sky". Astrology itself is mentioned only twice in Nostradamus's Preface and 41 times in the Centuries themselves, but more frequently in his dedicatory Letter to King Henry II. In the last quatrain of his sixth century he specifically attacks astrologers.

His historical sources include easily identifiable passages from Livy, Suetonius' The Twelve Caesars, Plutarch and other classical historians, as well as from medieval chroniclers such as Geoffrey of Villehardouin and Jean Froissart. Many of his astrological references are taken almost word for word from Richard Roussat's Livre de l'estat et mutations des temps of 1549–50.

One of his major prophetic sources was evidently the Mirabilis Liber of 1522, which contained a range of prophecies by Pseudo-Methodius, the Tiburtine Sibyl, Joachim of Fiore, Savonarola and others (his Preface contains 24 biblical quotations, all but two in the order used by Savonarola). This book had enjoyed considerable success in the 1520s, when it went through half a dozen editions, but did not sustain its influence, perhaps owing to its mostly Latin text (mixed with ancient Greek and modern French and Provençal), Gothic script and many difficult abbreviations. Nostradamus was one of the first to rephrase these prophecies in French, which may explain why they are credited to him. Modern views of plagiarism did not apply in the 16th century; authors frequently copied and paraphrased passages without acknowledgement, especially from the classics. The latest research suggests that he may in fact have used bibliomancy for this—randomly selecting a book of history or prophecy and taking his cue from whatever page it happened to fall open at.

Further material was gleaned from the De honesta disciplina of 1504 by Petrus Crinitus, which included extracts from Michael Psellos's De daemonibus, and the De Mysteriis Aegyptiorum (Concerning the mysteries of Egypt), a book on Chaldean and Assyrian magic by Iamblichus, a 4th-century Neo-Platonist. Latin versions of both had recently been published in Lyon, and extracts from both are paraphrased (in the second case, almost literally) in his first two verses, the first of which is appended to this article. While it is true that Nostradamus claimed in 1555 to have burned all of the occult works in his library, no one can say exactly what books were destroyed in this fire.

Only in the 17th century did people start to notice his reliance on earlier, mainly classical sources. (Note: Anonymous letters to the Mercure de France in August and November 1724 drew specific public attention to the fact (Anonyme) Lettre critique sur la personne et sur les écrits de Michel Nostradamus, Mercure de France, août et novembre 1724.)

Nostradamus's reliance on historical precedent is reflected in the fact that he explicitly rejected the label "prophet" (i.e., a person having prophetic powers of his own) on several occasions:

Although, my son, I have used the word prophet, I would not attribute to myself a title of such lofty sublimity.

— Preface to César, 1555

Not that I would attribute to myself either the name or the role of a prophet.

— Preface to César, 1555

[S]ome of [the prophets] predicted great and marvelous things to come: [though] for me, I in no way attribute to myself such a title here.

— Letter to King Henry II, 1558

Not that I am foolish enough to claim to be a prophet.

— Open letter to Privy Councillor (later Chancellor) Birague, 15 June 1566

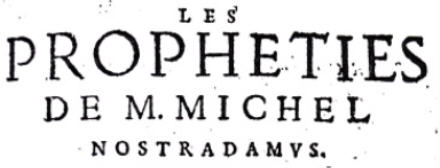
Detail from title-page of the original 1555 (Albi) edition of Nostradamus's Les Prophéties

Given this reliance on literary sources, it is unlikely that Nostradamus used any particular methods for entering a trance state, other than contemplation, meditation, and incubation. His sole description of this process is contained in 'letter 41' of his collected Latin correspondence. The popular legend that he attempted the ancient methods of flame gazing, water gazing or both simultaneously is based on a naive reading of his first two verses, which merely liken his efforts to those of the Delphic and Branchidic oracles. The first of these is reproduced at the bottom of this article, and the second can be seen by visiting the relevant facsimile site (see External Links). In his dedication to King Henry II, Nostradamus describes "emptying my soul, mind and heart of all care, worry and unease through mental calm and tranquility", but his frequent references to the "bronze tripod" of the Delphic rite are usually preceded by the words "as though" (compare, once again, External References to the original texts).

== Interpretations ==
=== Content of the quatrains ===
Most of the quatrains deal with disasters, such as plagues, earthquakes, wars, floods, invasions, murders, droughts, and battles—all undated and based on foreshadowings by the Mirabilis Liber. Some quatrains cover these disasters in overall terms; others concern a single person or a small group of people. Some cover a single town, others several towns in several countries. A major, underlying theme is an impending invasion of Europe by Muslim forces from farther east and south headed by the expected Antichrist, directly reflecting the then-current Ottoman invasions and the earlier Saracen equivalents, as well as the prior expectations of the Mirabilis Liber. All of this is presented in the context of the supposedly imminent end of the world—even though this is not in fact mentioned—a conviction that sparked numerous collections of end-time prophecies at the time, including an unpublished collection by Christopher Columbus. Views on Nostradamus have varied widely throughout history. Academic views, such as those of Jacques Halbronn, regard Nostradamus's Prophecies as antedated forgeries written by later authors for political reasons.

=== Popular claims ===
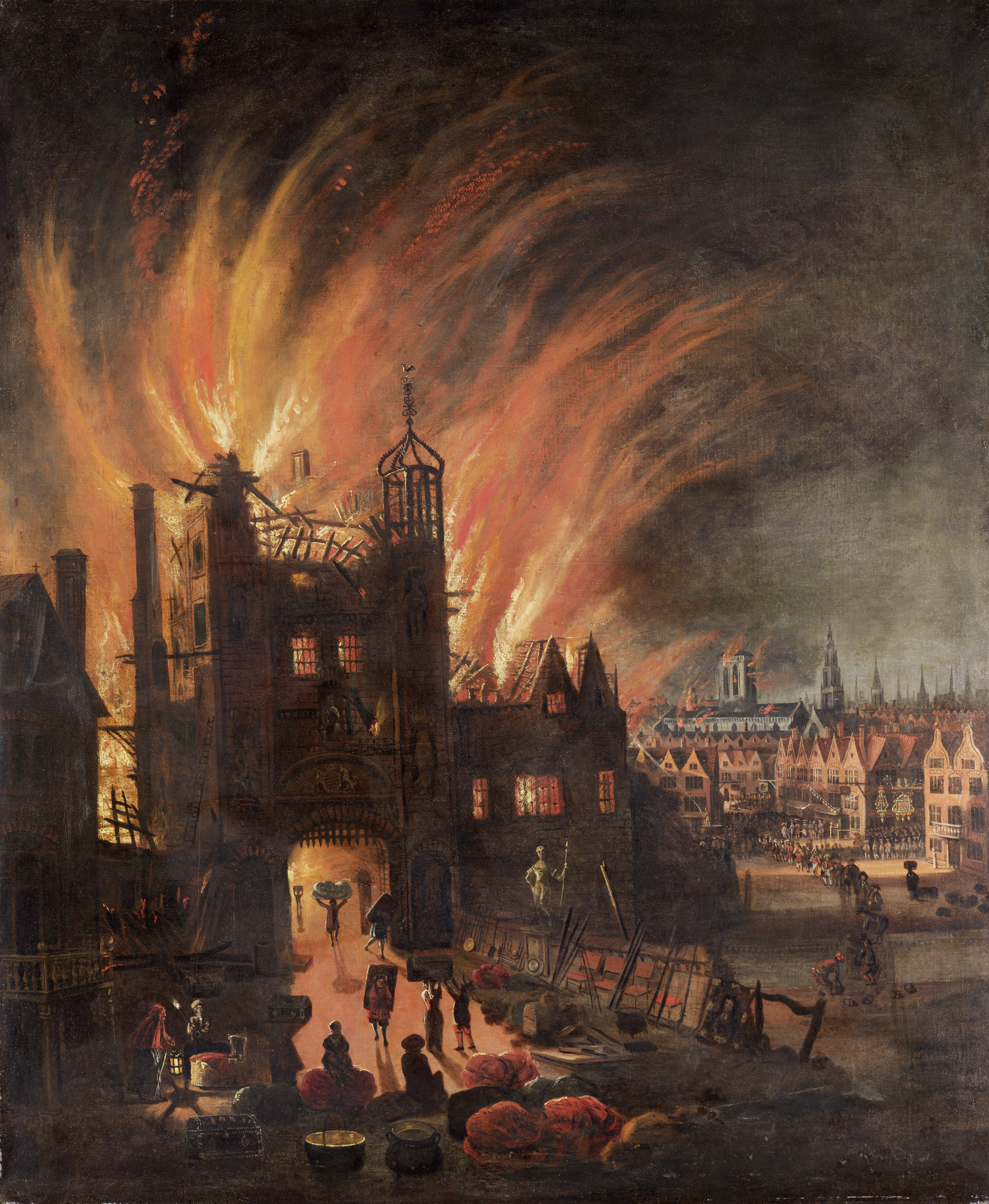
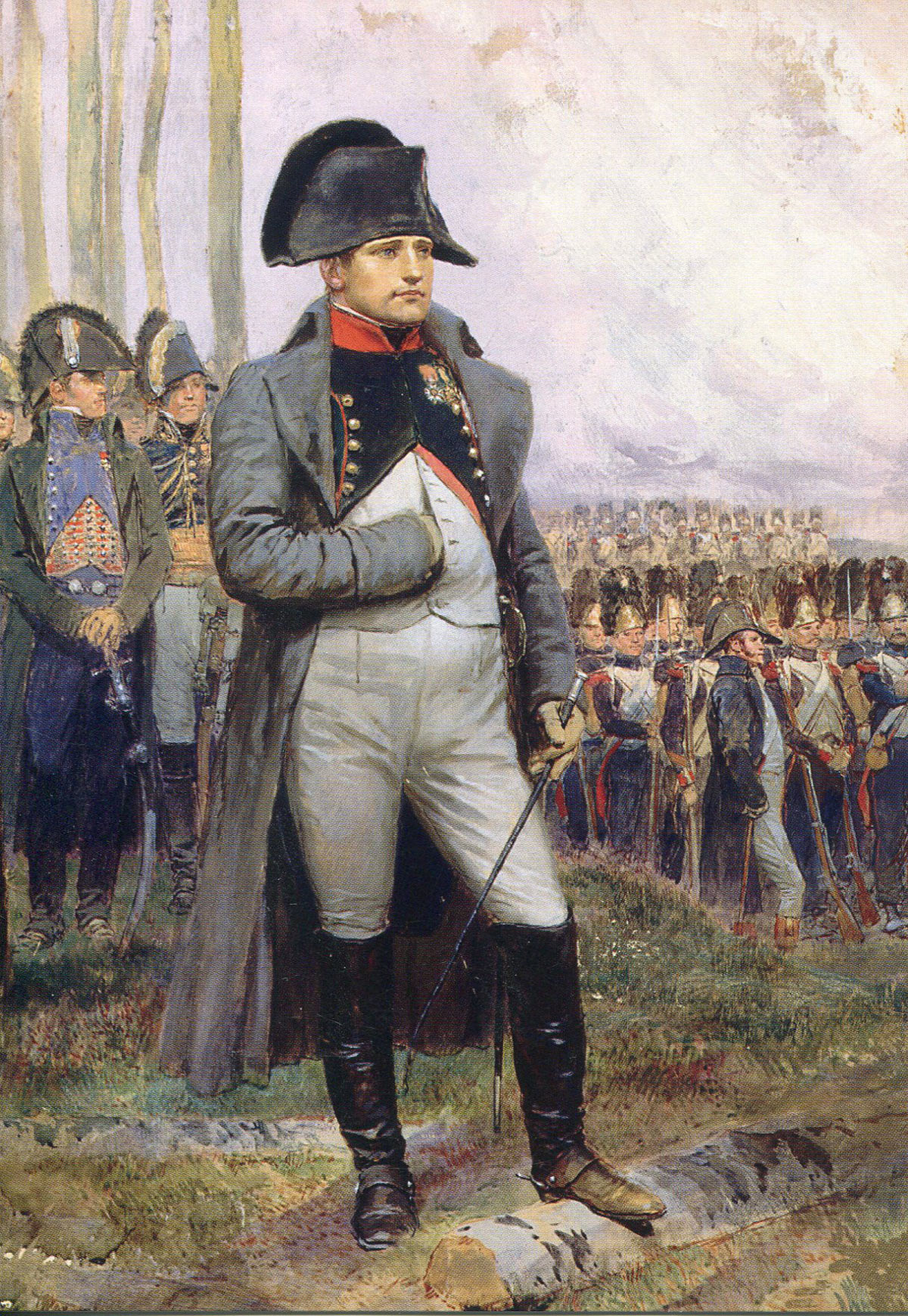
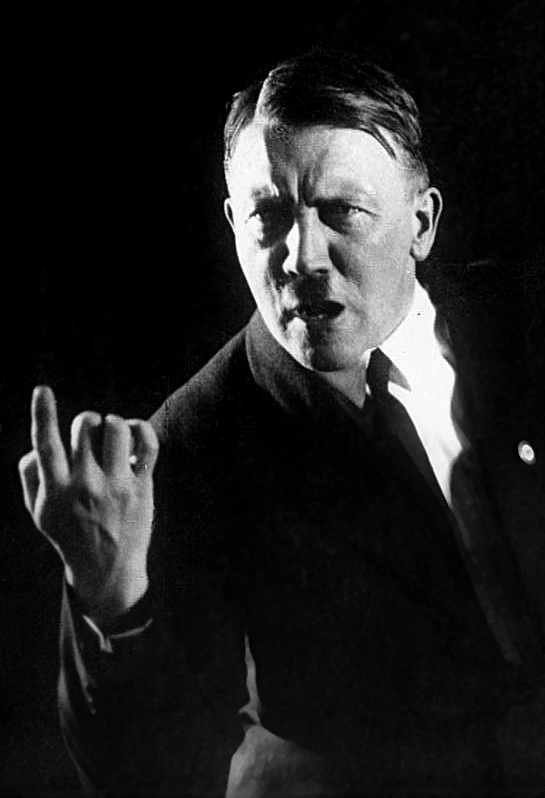
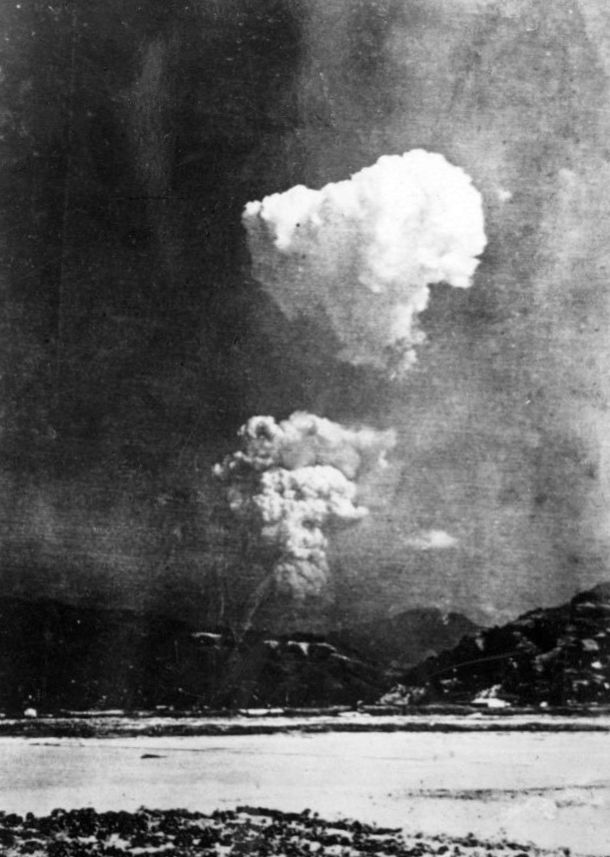
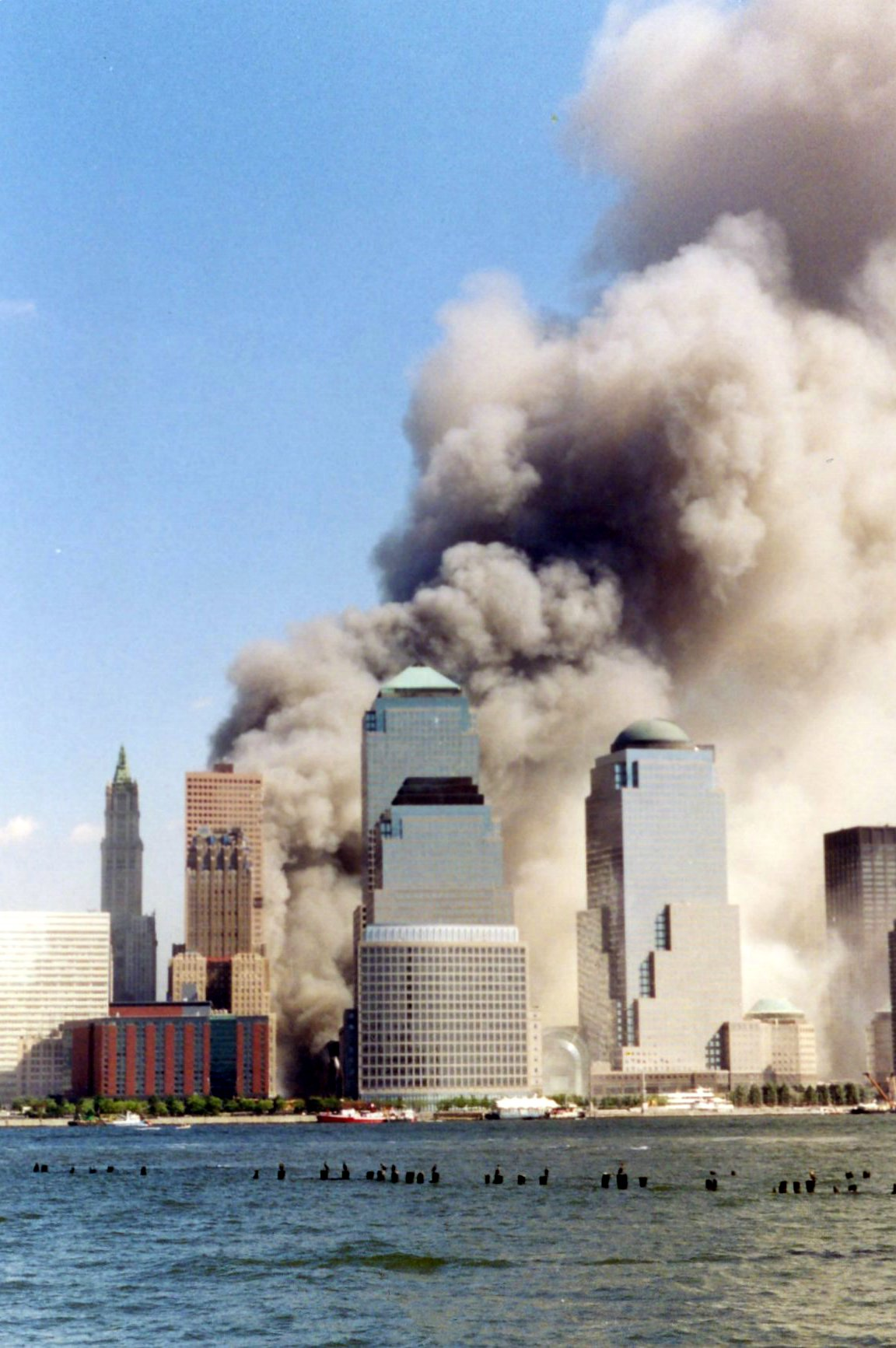
Nostradamus's supporters have retrospectively claimed that he predicted major world events, including the Great Fire of London, the French Revolution, the rises of Napoleon Bonaparte and Adolf Hitler, the atomic bombings of Hiroshima and Nagasaki, and the September 11 attacks.

Many of Nostradamus's supporters believe his prophecies are genuine. Owing to the subjective nature of these interpretations, no two of them completely agree on what Nostradamus predicted, whether for the past or for the future. Many supporters do agree, for example, that he predicted the Great Fire of London, the French Revolution, the rise of Napoleon and of Adolf Hitler, (Note: In several quatrains he mentions the name Hister, although this is the classical name for the Lower Danube, as he himself explains in his Presage for 1554. Similarly, the expression Pau, Nay, Loron—often interpreted as an anagram of "Napaulon Roy"—refers to three towns in southwestern France near his one-time home.) both world wars, and the nuclear destruction of Hiroshima and Nagasaki. Popular authors frequently claim that he predicted whatever major event had just happened at the time of each of their books' publication, such as the Apollo Moon landing in 1969, the Space Shuttle Challenger disaster in 1986, the death of Diana, Princess of Wales in 1997, and the September 11 attacks on the World Trade Center in 2001. This 'movable feast' aspect appears to be characteristic of the genre.

Possibly the first of these books to become popular in English was Henry C. Roberts' The Complete Prophecies of Nostradamus of 1947, reprinted at least seven times during the next forty years, which contained both transcriptions and translations, with brief commentaries. This was followed in 1961 (reprinted in 1982) by Edgar Leoni's Nostradamus and His Prophecies. After that came Erika Cheetham's The Prophecies of Nostradamus, incorporating a reprint of the posthumous 1568 edition, which was reprinted, revised, and republished several times from 1973 onwards, latterly as The Final Prophecies of Nostradamus. This served as the basis for the documentary The Man Who Saw Tomorrow and both did indeed mention possible generalised future attacks on New York (via nuclear weapons), though not specifically on the World Trade Center or on any particular date.

A two-part translation of Jean-Charles de Fontbrune's Nostradamus: historien et prophète was published in 1980, and John Hogue has published a number of books on Nostradamus from about 1987, including Nostradamus and the Millennium: Predictions of the Future, Nostradamus: The Complete Prophecies (1999), and Nostradamus: A Life and Myth (2003). In 1992, one commentator who claimed to be able to contact Nostradamus under hypnosis even had him "interpreting" his own verse X.6 (a prediction specifically about floods in southern France around the city of Nîmes and people taking refuge in its collosse, or Colosseum, a Roman amphitheatre now known as the Arènes) as a prediction of an undated attack on the Pentagon, despite the historical seer's clear statement in his dedicatory letter to King Henri II that his prophecies were about Europe, North Africa and part of Asia Minor.

With the exception of Roberts, these books and their many popular imitators were almost unanimous not merely about Nostradamus's powers of prophecy but also in inventing intriguing aspects of his purported biography: that he had been a descendant of the Israelite tribe of Issachar; he had been educated by his grandfathers, who had both been physicians to the court of Good King René of Provence; he had attended Montpellier University in 1525 to gain his first degree; after returning there in 1529, he had successfully taken his medical doctorate; he had gone on to lecture in the Medical Faculty there, until his views became too unpopular; he had supported the heliocentric view of the universe; he had travelled to the Habsburg Netherlands, where he had composed prophecies at the abbey of Orval; in the course of his travels, he had performed a variety of prodigies, including identifying future Pope, Sixtus V, who was then only a seminary monk. He is credited with having successfully cured the Plague at Aix-en-Provence and elsewhere; he had engaged in scrying, using either a magic mirror or a bowl of water; he had been joined by his secretary Chavigny at Easter 1554; having published the first installment of his Prophéties, he had been summoned by Queen Catherine de' Medici to Paris in 1556 specifically to discuss with her his prophecy at quatrain I.35 that her husband King Henri II would be killed in a duel; he had examined the royal children at Blois; he had bequeathed to his son a "lost book" of his own prophetic paintings; (Note: Actually the 13th–14th century Vaticinia de Summis Pontificibus in a misascribed version sometimes referred to as the Vaticinia Nostradami) he had been buried standing up; and he had been found, when dug up at the French Revolution, to be wearing a medallion bearing the exact date of his disinterment. This was first recorded by Samuel Pepys as early as 1667, long before the French Revolution. Pepys records in his celebrated diary a legend that, before his death, Nostradamus made the townsfolk swear that his grave would never be disturbed; but that 60 years later his body was exhumed, whereupon a brass plaque was found on his chest correctly stating the date and time when his grave would be opened and cursing the exhumers.

In 2000, Li Hongzhi claimed that the 1999 prophecy at X.72 was a prediction of the Chinese Falun Gong persecution which began in July 1999, leading to an increased interest in Nostradamus among Falun Gong members.

=== Usage during World War II ===
Nostradamus's work was used in propaganda during World War II by both Nazi Germany and the Allies. The Reichsminister of Public Enlightenment and Propaganda, Josef Goebbels, was introduced to Nostradamus's work by his wife Magda, "who brought to her husband's attention a claim made in a 1921 book by a German postal worker named C. L. Loog" which allegedly predicted "that there would be a crisis in Poland" and that England would be defeated in 1939.

Goebbels found "the predictions not only intriguing but potentially useful", and "tried to find someone to write propaganda based on Nostradamus." However, "Loog declined, so Goebbels eventually settled on a Swiss astrologer named Karl Ernst Krafft", who had allegedly used Nostradamus to "correctly predict an assassination attempt on Adolf Hitler in November 1939." Goebbels wrote in his diary on 9 January 1940 that he had "set up an expert committee to deal with Nostradamus and Astrology" in order to "supply the necessary material for propaganda", and on 16 January 1940 he wrote: "Trash out the Nostradamus verses in cooperation with the Intelligence Service for use in France and neutral countries. Every little helps." Krafft "produced propaganda booklets using spurious verses of Nostradamus which German planes airdropped over Belgium and France during the Nazi invasion of May 1940." The Allies responded by dropping "Nostradamus pamphlets of their own over occupied Europe, and MGM made four short Nostradamus films to boost American morale."

However, Goebbels seems to have seen Nostradamus simply as a black propaganda tool. He wrote that his friend, the Nazi journalist Alfred-Ingemar Berndt, had "drawn up a plan demonstrating how we could enlist the aid of the occult in our propaganda. ... The Americans and English fall easily for that type of thing. ... Nostradamus must once again submit to being quoted." One passage that Goebbels made use of was:

And war will break out in Europe on so vast and fearful a scale as never before. Death and destruction, conflict and bloodshed, will descend on princes and people alike, and press hard on the people of the middle kingdom until in the end the cities of Paris and London and those that be far to the East will be engulfed in a sea of flame. But that people which stands under the sign of the crooked cross, that people will triumph, to live in peace, prosperity and happiness, a proud dominion for a thousand years."

However, "Nostradamus did not write a word of all this. Goebbels himself was the author." According to Nazi diplomat and author Hans Otto Meissner, Goebbels also allegedly had "a few folios from the mid-sixteenth century carefully copied and the operative sentences, in Latin text and Gothic script, laboriously inscribed on genuine parchment" and falsified "further passages ... such as 'giant fish which swim around in the sea with sailors in their bellies' or 'birds of iron'. When the forgeries had accomplished their objective, the volumes in question disappeared from the libraries, so that a more thorough examination was no longer possible."

=== Scholarly rebuttal ===
From the 1980s onward, an academic reaction set in, especially in France. The publication in 1983 of Nostradamus' private correspondence and, during succeeding years, of the original editions of 1555 and 1557 discovered by Chomarat and Benazra, together with the unearthing of much original archival material, revealed that much that was claimed about Nostradamus did not fit the documented facts. The academics revealed that not one of the claims just listed was backed up by any known contemporary documentary evidence. Most of them had evidently been based on unsourced rumours relayed as fact by much later commentators, such as Jaubert (1656), Guynaud (1693), and Bareste (1840); on modern misunderstandings of the 16th-century French texts; or on pure invention. Even the often-advanced suggestion that quatrain I.35 had successfully prophesied King Henry II's death did not actually appear in print for the first time until 1614, 55 years after the event.

Skeptics such as James Randi suggest that his reputation as a prophet is largely manufactured by modern-day supporters who fit his words to events that have either already occurred or are so imminent as to be inevitable, a process sometimes known as "retroactive clairvoyance" (postdiction). No Nostradamus quatrain is known to have been interpreted as predicting a specific event before it occurred, other than in vague, general terms that could equally apply to any number of other events. This even applies to quatrains that contain specific dates, such as III.77, which predicts "in 1727, in October, the king of Persia [shall be] captured by those of Egypt"—a prophecy that has, as ever, been interpreted retrospectively in the light of later events, in this case as though it presaged the known peace treaty between the Ottoman Empire and Persia of that year; Egypt was also an important Ottoman territory at this time. Similarly, Nostradamus's notorious "1999" prophecy at X.72 (see Nostradamus in popular culture) describes no event that commentators have succeeded in identifying either before or since, other than by twisting the words to fit whichever of the many contradictory happenings they claim as "hits". Moreover, no quatrain suggests, as is often claimed by books and films on the alleged Mayan Prophecy, that the world would end in December 2012. In his preface to the Prophecies, Nostradamus himself stated that his prophecies extend "from now to the year 3797"—an extraordinary date which, given that the preface was written in 1555, may have more than a little to do with the fact that 2242 (3797–1555) had recently been proposed by his major astrological source Richard Roussat as a possible date for the end of the world.

Additionally, scholars have pointed out that almost all English translations of Nostradamus's quatrains are of extremely poor quality: they seem to display little or no knowledge of 16th-century French, are tendentious, and are sometimes intentionally altered to make them fit whatever events to which the translator believed they were supposed to refer (or vice versa). None of them were based on the original editions of Les Prophéties: Roberts based his writings on that of Garencières's 1672 translation, while Cheetham and Hogue used the posthumous edition published in 1568. Even Leoni accepted that he had never seen the earliest editions of Nostradamus's work, which he claimed were "neither complete nor available", and indicated elsewhere in his book that much of the biographical material he had included about Nostradamus was unsourced.

None of this research and criticism was originally known to most of the English-language commentators, by dint of the dates when they were writing and, to some extent, the language in which it was written. Hogue was in a position to take advantage of it, but it was only in 2003 that he accepted that some of his earlier biographical material had, in fact, been apocryphal. Meanwhile, some of the more recent sources listed (Lemesurier, Gruber, Wilson) have been particularly scathing about later attempts by some lesser-known authors and Internet enthusiasts to extract alleged hidden meanings from the texts, whether with the aid of anagrams, numerical codes, graphs, or otherwise.

== In popular culture ==
The prophecies retold and expanded by Nostradamus figured largely in popular culture in the 20th and 21st centuries. As well as being the subject of hundreds of books (both fiction and nonfiction), Nostradamus' life has been depicted in several films and videos, and his life and writings continue to be a subject of media interest.

== See also ==
- Alchemy
- List of astrologers
- Mysticism
- Roger Frontenac
- Scientific skepticism
- Apocalypse date predictions
