= Juan Orús Madinyá =

Spanish architect active in Ecuador

- Born: Juan Antonio Orús Madinyá; 1892; Barcelona, Spain
- Died: 1987 (aged 94–95); Guayaquil, Ecuador
- Occupation: Architect
- Years active: c. 1927 – 1960s
- Buildings: Guayaquil Metropolitan Cathedral; Castillo de Espronceda; Torre Morisca

Juan Antonio Orús Madinyá (1892–1987) was a Spanish architect active in Guayaquil, Ecuador. Architectural historiography associates him with several prominent heritage works in Guayaquil, including a long period directing and modifying the neo-Gothic cathedral project, and the 1937 neo-Moorish ornamental intervention that gave the city's clock tower its definitive identity as the Torre Morisca.

== Biography ==
=== Early life and education ===
Published architectural histories identify Orús as Catalan and report his birth in Barcelona, Spain, in 1892, and his death in Guayaquil, Ecuador, in 1987.

=== Migration to Ecuador and professional practice ===
A major academic architectural history states that Orús arrived in Guayaquil in July 1927. The same source states that between 1934 and 1936 he established an architecture-and-construction office with Joaquín Pérez Nin de Cardona, through which they developed projects linked to the “californiano” and Art Deco currents then present in Guayaquil's residential and small-building commissions. From 1936 onward, he is described as working independently and producing multiple projects in neo-colonial and picturesque idioms, alongside work that has been discussed in relation to Art Deco in Guayaquil.

== Major works ==
=== Guayaquil Metropolitan Cathedral ===
A municipal heritage publication describes the neo-Gothic project as authored by architect Paolo Russo for the Sociedad General de Construcciones in 1924, and states that from 1941 to 1958 the construction was under Orús, who designed the façade and carried out interior works while respecting Russo's designs. In an academic architectural history, Orús is likewise described as being dedicated from 1941 to 1958 to directing construction and producing the definitive main façade, while respecting the neo-Gothic conception developed by Russo. A later newspaper column by architect-historian Florencio Compte gives a more granular sequence: early plans in 1922, first stone in 1924, Paolo Russo taking direction in 1930, and Orús assuming direction in January 1944 until 1958; it also states that the cathedral was finally completed in 1969. These accounts support treating the cathedral as a multi-phase work with Orús as a principal later director and designer rather than the sole original author.

=== Torre Morisca ===
A scholarly architectural history highlights Orús's 1937 intervention in the city's clock tower, stating that the original project was by Joaquín Pérez Nin de Cardona and engineer Francisco Ramón, and that Orús gave the tower the neo-Moorish image it retains. A journal article focused on the tower's symbolic and formal language similarly states that in 1937 the modification of the ornamentation was commissioned to Orús, and notes the other primary project authors and the participation of Emilio Soro.

=== Castillo de Espronceda ===
Multiple Ecuadorian newspapers describe the Castillo de Espronceda (at the corner of Eloy Alfaro and Venezuela streets, Guayaquil) as a 1930s-era building attributed to Orús. A report in El Universo states that it was constructed in 1930 by the Spanish architect Juan Orús Madinyá. El Telégrafo likewise states that it was built in the 1930s by Orús, providing contextual information about the owner and adjacent industrial uses historically associated with the site. Expreso also identifies Orús as the architect of the building in a feature on Guayaquil's historic “castles”.

=== Other works ===
Academic discussion of Guayaquil's 1930–1948 architectural production attributes to Orús, among other projects, the Edificio Juan X. Marcos, Casa Gabriel Vilaseca (1936), and Edificio La Frutal (1937), and notes his broader involvement across neo-colonial and picturesque currents after 1936. A later Art Deco-focused study credits him with works including Colegio Salesiano Cristóbal Colón (1947–1951), the Edificio Orús (1954–1957), Colegio Jesuita 20 de Abril (1957), and a building for the Sociedad Española de Beneficencia (1958). A news report states that the Palacio Municipal is attributed to Francesco Maccaferri and Orús, though that attribution has been treated cautiously because Orús's documented arrival in Guayaquil postdates the beginning of the palace's design history.

== Style and significance ==
In architectural historiography, Orús is presented as part of the immigrant professional cohort that helped shape Guayaquil's transition from a wooden city to modern construction after major fires, participating across eclectic and modernizing idioms rather than a single signature style. His work is specifically linked to neo-Gothic ecclesiastical architecture, neo-Moorish formal language, and Art Deco-era residential and institutional architecture in Guayaquil.

=== Later life and death ===
Published architectural histories report his death in Guayaquil in 1987. A municipal guide also credits “Juan Antonio Orús” with the 1965 concrete base and stairs associated with the Sagrado Corazón de Jesús monument complex, suggesting continued professional activity into at least the 1960s.

== Family ==
According to genealogical compilations, Orús Madinyá's grandfather was Antonio Madinyá Vilasendra. He was also related to Dr. Alejo Lascano Bahamonde and was a second-degree cousin of the poet Maria Leonor Madinya.

== Legacy ==
Orús's association with multiple recognized heritage landmarks in Guayaquil—documented in municipal publications, academic architectural history, and major newspapers—has made him a recurring figure in accounts of the city's twentieth-century architectural transformation. His 1937 clock-tower intervention is repeatedly cited as the moment the structure acquired the neo-Moorish image that became a civic icon.

== Bibliography ==
- del Pino Martínez, Inés, ed. (2009). Ciudad y arquitectura republicana en Ecuador 1850–1950 (in Spanish). Quito: Pontificia Universidad Católica del Ecuador.
- Compte Guerrero, Florencio (2020). "Modernos sin modernidad. Arquitectura de Guayaquil 1930–1948" (PDF). Cuaderno 81 (in Spanish). Centro de Estudios en Diseño y Comunicación: 99–276. ISSN 1668-0227.
- Torres, Sergio Javier. "Historia Guayaquil" (in Spanish). Dirección de Turismo y Promoción Cívica, Municipio de Guayaquil.
- Donoso Llanos, Marta Lil (2018). "Tiempo morisco en Guayaquil". Arquitectura y Urbanismo (in Spanish). 39 (2): 86–91. ISSN 1815-5898.
- Compte Guerrero, Florencio (2023). "El Art Déco en Guayaquil como expresión de la modernidad". Cuaderno 192 (in Spanish): 103–115.
