= Mirabilis Liber =

1522 compilation of Christian predictions

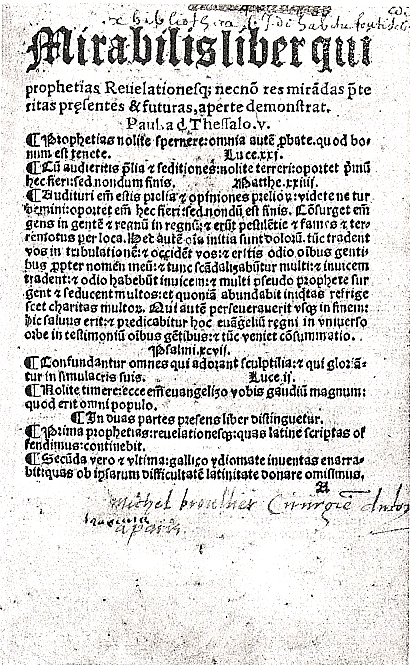
Title page

The Mirabilis liber (Mirabilis liber qui prophetias revelationesque, necnon res mirandas, preteritas, presentes et futuras, aperte demonstrat...) is an anonymous and formerly very popular compilation of predictions by various Christian saints and diviners first printed in France in 1522 (though purportedly published in Rome in 1524, probably because it was the date of an important and long-anticipated planetary alignment) and reprinted several times thereafter. It is not to be confused with the almost contemporary Liber mirabilis. Its unwitting contributors include:

- Bishop Bemechobus (misprint for Pseudo-Methodius – Syrian, 7th century)
- The Tiburtine Sibyl (Syrian, 9th century)
- ‘St Augustine of Hippo’ (actually by the 10th-century monk Adso of Montier-en-Der)
- ‘St Severus’ (in fact a 15th-century composition)
- Johann Lichtenberger (an anthology of various named sources, first printed in 1488)
- A set of papal prophecies (14th century)
- Telesphorus of Cosenza (14th century)
- Another anthology including St Brigid of Sweden, St Hildegard of Bingen, the Cretan Sibyl, the Hermit Reynard, St Cyril and the celebrated Abbot Joachim of Fiore
- Joannes de Vatiguerro (16th century)
- Joachim of Fiore himself (12th century)
- ‘St Vincent’ (actually a 16th-century compilation based on St Thomas Aquinas and others)
- St. Catald of Taranto (actually a 16th-century text)
- Jerome of Ferrara (Savonarola – late 15th century)
- Fra Bonaventura (16th century)
- Johannes de Rupescissa (Jean de la Roquetaillade – 15th century)
- St Bridget of Sweden (14th century)

plus, in French, an anonymous anthology including a collection of late 13th-century prophecies elsewhere attributed to ‘Merlin’.

As the above indicates, the book—whose only known complete translation (by Edouard Bricon) was published in French in 1831—had two parts, the first in Latin and the second, shorter, in French. It contained prophecies of fire, plague, famine, floods, earthquakes, droughts, comets, brutal occupations and bloody oppressions. The Church would collapse, the Pope be forced to flee Rome. Such predictions made it extremely popular at the time of the French Revolution, when crowds besieged the French Bibliothèque Nationale to see it. Indeed, many nineteenth-century catalogues suggested that it had predicted the Revolution itself. But above all the book predicted a supposedly imminent Arab invasion of Europe, the advent of the Antichrist and the subsequent End of the World.

The Mirabilis liber seems to have served as a major source for the prophecies of Nostradamus, and was placed on the Lisbon version of the Church's Index of Forbidden Books in 1581.

== Sources ==
- Araujo, Fabio R., Selected Prophecies and Prophets, 2007
- Britnell, J. and Stubbs, D., The Mirabilis liber, its Compilation and Influence in the Journal of the Warburg and Courtauld Institutes, Volume 49, 1986
- Lemesurier, P., Nostradamus – The Illustrated Prophecies (O Books, 2003)
- Lemesurier, P., The Unknown Nostradamus (O Books, 2003)
