= Arcandam =

16th Century astrological pseudonym

Arcandam was a celebrated astrological pseudonym of the sixteenth century, under which books of predictions were published in Latin and French from about 1540. The name was still in use in the 1630s. It is assumed that Richard Roussat, a canon and physician of Lyon whose name appears on the early works as editor, was the author of the early works.

The best known of the Arcandam books is the Livre de l'estat et mutation des temps of 1550. This formed one of the sources for the prophecies of Nostradamus.

There are some secondary pseudonyms/attributions appearing alongside Arcandam:

- Aleandrin,
- Aleandrinus,
- Aleandram,
- Alcandrin,
- Alcandrinus (perhaps suggesting Alkindus),
- Al-Kindi.
