= Louis Serre (physician) =

French physician

Louis Serre was a 16th-century Marseille based French physician. Along with Colin Pellenc, in 1540 he was accused of heresy. In 1545 he worked with Nostradamus in fighting a major plague outbreak in Marseille.
