= Traité des fardemens =

Pharmacological treatise by Nostradamus

Nostradamus's Traité des fardemens et confitures, variously entitled Moult utile opuscule... and Le vrai et parfaict embellissement de la face..., was first published in 1555, even though it contained a Proem, or prologue, dated 1552. Clearly the work of an apothecary, it contained recipes for preparing cosmetics and preserves, the latter based largely on sugar, which was controlled at the time by the apothecaries' guilds.

== Content ==
Among the topics covered were:

A. THE COSMETICS MANUAL

- Chapter VI: To make a perfect nutmeg oil
- Chapter VIII [the one giving Nostradamus's famous plague remedy]: To make the basis of a perfectly good and excellent aromatic powder
- Chapter X: To make a sweet smelling, long lasting paste
- Chapter XI: Another method for making aromatic balls
- Chapter XIII: Powder for cleaning and whitening the teeth
- Chapter XIIII: Another more excellent method for cleaning the teeth, even rotten ones [by filing them down]
- Chapter XV: Perfumed water for impregnating the shapes or forms mentioned above
- Chapter XVIII (1556): To truly make the lovers’ sexual potion which the ancients used for love-making
- Chapter XXIIII: How to make the hair golden blond
- Chapter XXVI [often erroneously described as for an aphrodisiac: A supreme and very useful composition for the health of the human body
- Chapter XXVII: There follows the way in which one should use the above mentioned composition

B. THE COOKBOOK

- Chapter III: To make candied orange peel, using sugar or honey
- Chapter VIII: How to make a jam or preserve with heart cherries
- Chapter XV: To make a quince jelly of superb beauty, goodness, flavour and excellence fit to set before a King
- Chapter XXIIII: To preserve pears
- Chapter XXV: To make a very fine sugar candy
- Chapter XXVII: To make marzipan
- Chapter XXIX: To make a laxative rose syrup

The book was translated into German in 1574, then the German was revised in 1994, and finally the German was translated into English under the title The Elixirs of Nostradamus (Moyer Bell, 1996). Needless to say, the fourth-hand results of this process were unreliable, if not downright dangerous: the term roses rouges incarnées, for example, was routinely translated as 'black orchids', and urines (urine) came out as 'drinking wells'.

== Sources ==
- Lemesurier, P., The Nostradamus Encyclopedia (Godsfield/St Martin's, 1997)
- Lemesurier, P., The Unknown Nostradamus (O Books, 2003)
- Wilson, I., Nostradamus: The Evidence (Orion, 2002)/ Nostradamus: The Man Behind the Prophecies (St Martin's 2007)
- Nostradamus' Recipe For Cherry Jelly
