= Maria Leonor Madinya =

Ecuadorian poet and radio presenter

María Leonor Madinyá
- Born: María Leonor Madinyá Andrade; 15 February 1936; Guayaquil, Ecuador
- Died: 7 September 2006 (aged 70); Guayaquil, Ecuador
- Occupations: Poet, radio presenter
- Notable work: Palpitar de un sueño, Ventana del Alba

María Leonor Madinyá Andrade (15 February 1936 – 7 September 2006) was an Ecuadorian poet and radio presenter from Guayaquil. She is best known for the poetry collections Palpitar de un sueño (1966) and Ventana del Alba (1968), as well as for hosting the radio program Música y Poesía. After losing her sight in early adulthood, she learned Braille and remained active in literary and educational work.

== Biography ==
Madinyá was born in Guayaquil in 1936. After completing secondary school in 1953, she suffered an accident that led to progressive vision loss. By 1958, she was completely blind. The following year, she began learning Braille and enrolled at the Escuela Municipal de Ciegos in Guayaquil.

Her literary career began in 1960, when one of her sonnets was published in the literary supplement of El Universo. In 1962, she launched Música y Poesía on Radio Cristal, later continuing the program on Radio Cenit.

She published Palpitar de un sueño in 1966, followed by Ventana del Alba in 1968, which received an award from Ecuador's Ministry of Education. Her later works included Dialogar íntimo (1974) and the co-authored Pórtico entre dos almas (1970).

Madinyá also worked in support of blind readers and students. In 1976, she received a scholarship to study at the Instituto de Ciegos “Luis Braille” in Lima, Peru, where she took courses related to blindness education and psychology. She later gave talks and Braille lessons in Ecuador.

She died in Guayaquil on 7 September 2006 at the age of 70.

== Selected works ==
- Palpitar de un sueño (1966)
- Ventana del Alba (1968)
- Pórtico entre dos almas (1970)
- Dialogar íntimo (1974)
