= Orus Apollo =

Manuscript work by Nostradamus

The Orus Apollo is a manuscript work by Nostradamus written before 1555, and formerly owned by Jean-Baptiste Colbert, Louis XIV's finance minister. It contains two books of 182 verse epigrams. Its full title is Orus Apollo Fils de Osiris Roy de Aegypte Niliacque, des Notes Hieroglyphiques.

The work is a purported translation of an ancient Greek work on Egyptian hieroglyphs that had been commented on by Marsilio Ficino, Erasmus and François Rabelais. It was known to the artists Albrecht Dürer, Andrea Mantegna and Raphael. Although its title implies a connection to Egyptian gods, the French work is actually Nostradamus' extremely free translation of Horapollon of Manuthis' Hieroglyphica, based on Jean Mercier's Latin-Greek version of 1551. He also added some ten pieces of his own. The manuscript, apparently in Nostradamus's own hand, still exists in the Bibliothèque nationale de France, Paris, as French manuscript No. 2594. The paper has been analyzed, and found to date from 1535–1539 and to stem from somewhere in the general area of the Comtat Venaissin and Provence.

It was dedicated to Jeanne d'Albret, later (from 1555) Queen of Navarre, and is of particular interest to students of Nostradamus' Propheties for its near-total lack of either accents or punctuation (which suggests that their original manuscripts, too, may have lacked both).

It is now housed in the Lyon municipal library.

== Bibliography ==
- Allemand, J., Nostradamus et les hiéroglyphes (Maison de Nostradamus, Salon, 1996)
- Lemesurier, P., The Unknown Nostradamus (O Books, 2003)
- Rollet, P. (ed), Interprétation des hiéroglyphes de Horapollo (Marcel Petit, 1993).
- Manuel Sanchez, Nostradamus Orus Apolo (Lulu, 2016)
