= Les Prophéties =

Collection of Nostradamus's prophecies

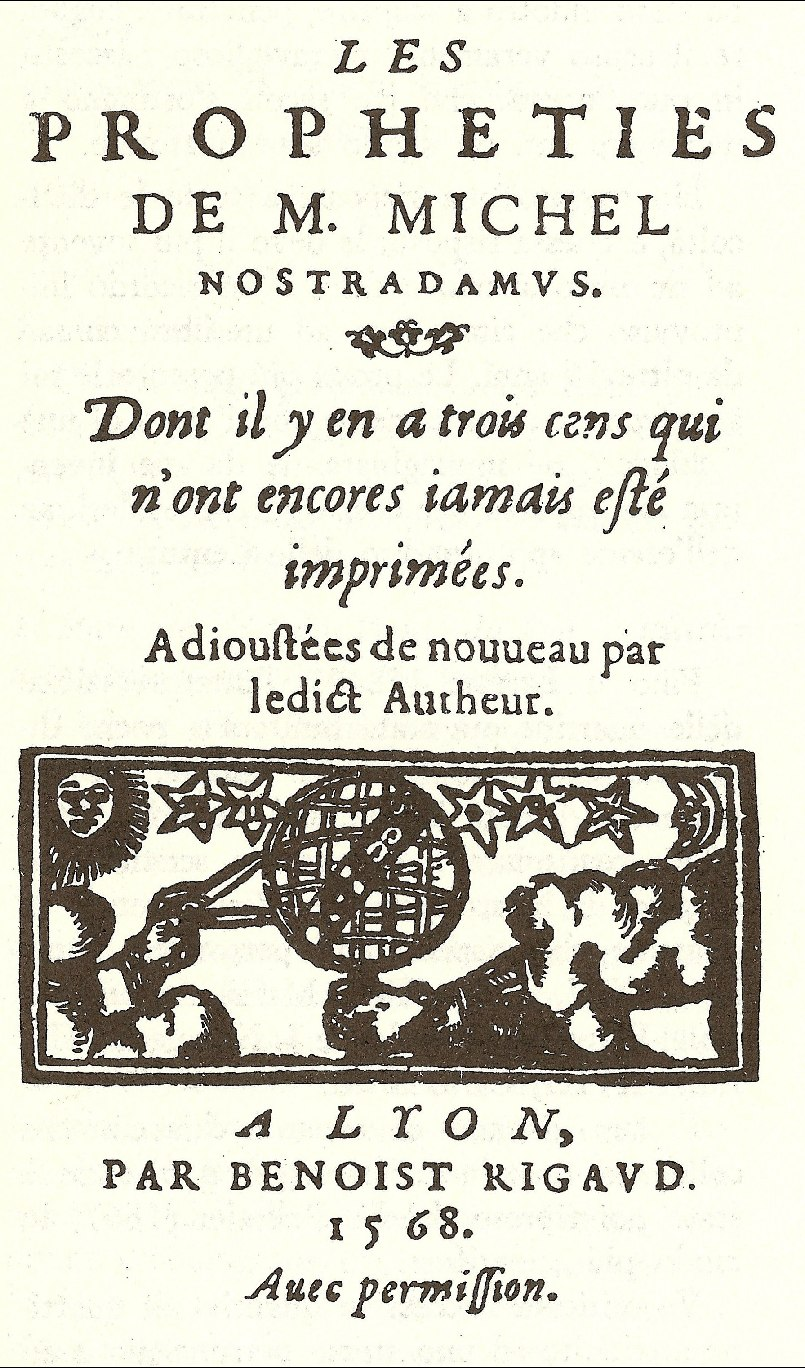
Nostradamus Centuries, 1568

Les Prophéties (The Prophecies) is a collection of prophecies by French physician Nostradamus, the first edition of which was published in 1555 by Macé Bonhomme. His most famous work, it is a collection of poems, quatrains, organized in ten sets of verses ("Centuries") of 100 quatrains each.

The first edition included three whole Centuries and 53 quatrains. The book begins with a preface, in the form of a message to his son César, followed by the Centuries themselves. The second edition was published in the same year and has minor differences from the first.

The third edition was published in 1557, and included the full text of the previous edition, supplemented by three more Centuries. The fourth edition was published two years after the death of the author, in 1568. It is the first edition to include all ten Centuries, as well as a second preface, the Letter to King Henry II. However, quatrains 55 to 100 of the seventh Century were never completed.

The first English edition, titled The True Prophecies or Prognostications of Michael Nostradamus, Physician to Henry II. Francis II. and Charles IX. Kings of France, was published in London by Thomas Ratcliffe and Nathaniel, in the year 1672.

The predictions do not follow chronological coherence and were written combining French, Greek, Latin and Occitan. It is believed that it contains anagrams, mythological and astrological references, in a subjective language that makes comprehension difficult. Some scholars claim that this was a resource used by Nostradamus to evade the Holy Inquisition, for fear of being persecuted for heresy.

Most of the quatrains deal with disasters, and Nostradamus gained notoriety for the belief in his ability to predict the future.

== Sources ==
- Leoni, E., Nostradamus and His Prophecies (Wings, 1961–82)
- Lemesurier, P., The Nostradamus Encyclopedia (Godsfield/St Martin’s, 1997)
- Lemesurier, P., Nostradamus – The Illustrated Prophecies (O Books, 2003)
- Wilson, I., Nostradamus: The Evidence (Orion, 2002)/ Nostradamus: The Man Behind the Prophecies (St Martin's 2007)
