= Brémonde de Tarascon =

French félibresse and poet

Brémonde de Tarascon / Bremoundo de Tarascouno
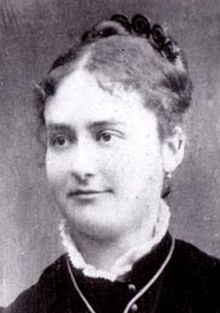
- Born: Alexandrine Élisabeth Brémond; 28 October 1858; Tarascon, Bouches-du-Rhône, France
- Died: 22 June 1898 (aged 39); Fontvieille, Bouches-du-Rhône. France
- Other name: Aleissandrino Bremound
- Occupation: Poet

Alexandrine Élisabeth Brémond (28 October 1858 – 22 June 1898), known as Brémonde de Tarascon (in French) or Bremoundo de Tarascoun (in Occitan), was a well known poet from the south of France who wrote in the Occitan language. She was a member of the Félibrige, a society that tried to preserve the language and its literature.

== Life ==
Alexandrine Élisabeth Brémond was born in Tarascon, Bouches-du-Rhône, on 28 October 1858. Her parents were Alexandre Brémond and Henriette Reynier. They owned and cultivated a farm in Trébon, near Arles, and soon after her birth acquired the Darbousille farm at Fontvieille, Bouches-du-Rhône, also near Arles. She grew up in modest circumstances. Alexandrine began writing poetry in Provençal under the pseudonym "Brémonde de Tarascon", or "Bremoundo de Tarascouno" in Provençal, and would become one of the best known Provençal poets of her day.

In 1885, Brémonde de Tarascon was awarded the prize for poetry at the Grand Jo Flourau dou Felibrige (Great Floral Games of the Félibrige). The Grands Jeux Floraux have been held every seven years since 1878 by the Félibrige to reward the best writers in the Occitan language. The grand prize winner has the honor of choosing the Queen of the Félibrige, an honorary title that will be held for the next seven years. Brémonde de Tarascon chose Thérèse Roumanille, wife of Jules Boissière. (Note: Jules Boissière was secretary of the Félibrige de Paris for many years before moving to French Indochina.)

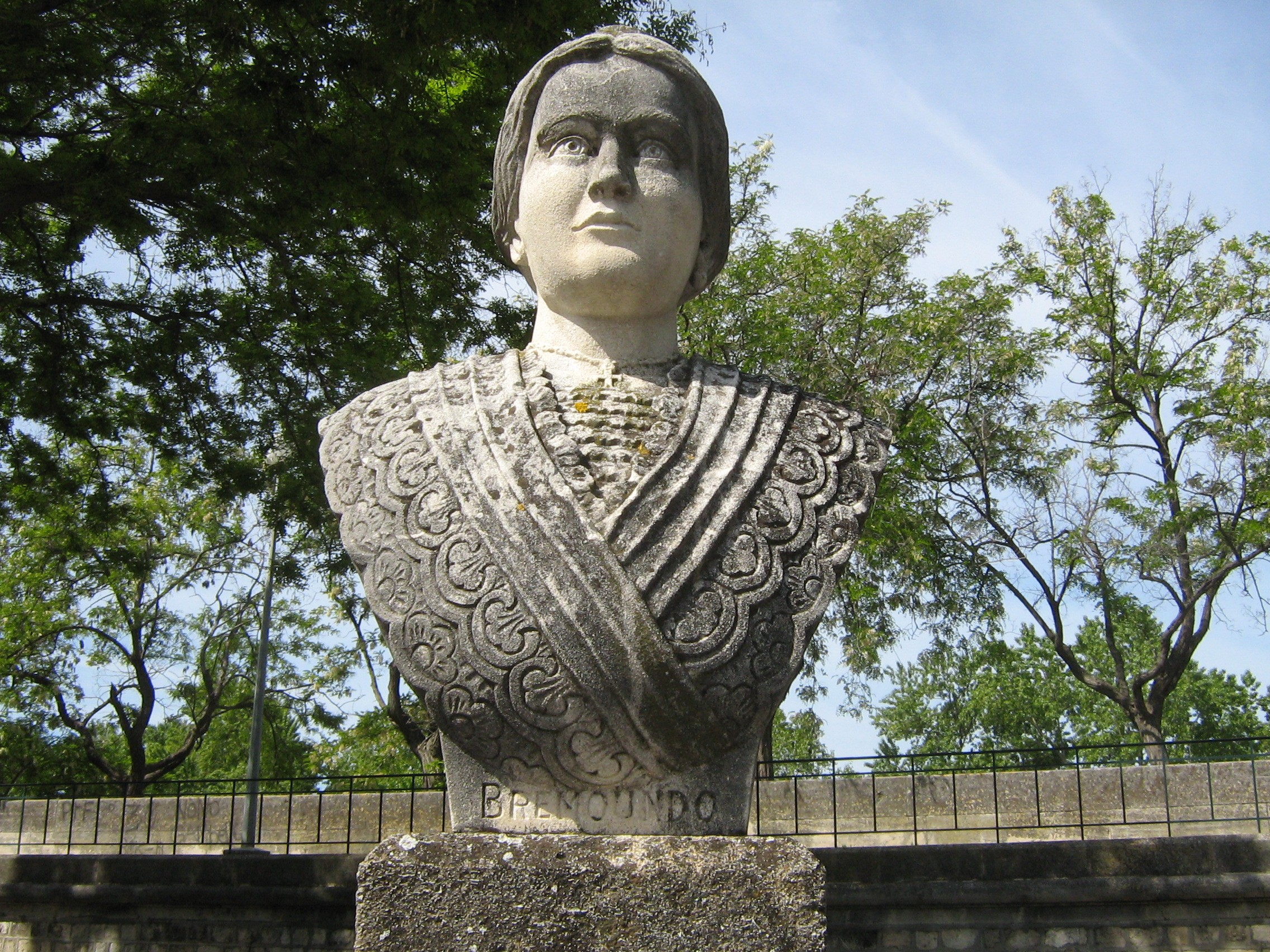
Bust of Brémond inaugurated on 2 May 1965 by the town of Tarascon and the Acadèmia dels Jòcs Florals

On 25 November 1886, Alexandrine married the lawyer Joseph Gautier, who also wrote poetry. A few years later, her parents divorced. Alexandrine gave birth to a daughter, Marthe Gautier, in 1894. Marthe later became a police medical inspector in Paris. Alexandrine died of acute bronchitis on 22 June 1898 at the Darboussille farmhouse, aged 40. Her eulogy was pronounced by the poet Charloun Rieu. The town of Tarascon has given her name to one of its squares and erected a bust of the poet. The bust, by sculptor Camille Soccorsi, was inaugurated on 2 May 1965.

== Work ==
Frédéric Mistral (neveu) said Alexandrine Élisabeth Brémond was the most lyrical of the Provençal poets, and saw her as the literary sister of Théodore Aubanel. Her first work to appear in print was Li Blavet de Mount-Majour (The Blueberries of Montmajour, 1883). The poems celebrate flowers, pretty girls at the window, spring, laughter, the breeze in the trees and a serene song of young love, joy and hope. In Velo blanco (White Veil), which appeared in 1887, a girl who is bold and timid, who laughs and cries, sings her hopes; a woman speaks her love. The superb L'Amazone was included in the second volume of the Anthologie du Félibrige Provençal, edited by Charles Pierre Julian and Pierre Fontan.

Alexandrine's next work, published five years later, was Brut de canèu (Sound of reeds). Frédéric Mistral wrote the preface. The collection is a second return to her childhood, the great plains of the Trébon of Arles where she saw her father's laborers tracing their furrows as far as the eye could see towards Montmajour, whose towers exalt the glory of God, towards the banks of the Vigueirat Marshes where she saw the fish spawn and the water lilies bloom, and towards the farmhouse at Darbousille where she gazed at the stars in the long summer evenings. Three poems are exceptional: Le maître d'aire; Aubanel, in honour of the great lyric poet; and Pluie d'étoiles (Rain of Stars), describing a flock of stars that turn into women as they touch the ground, the muses, dreamers and singers of all the ages.

Lou debanaire flouri (The Flowery Reel) with a preface by Paul Arène, was not published until 1908, ten years after her death. It was a collection of poems that had appeared in various publications during her life. One, in verses that leap like bulls, tells the legend of the Bulls of Peter. It is perhaps the best known.

== Publications ==
- Aleissandrino Bremound (1883), Li Blavet de Mount-Majour, Mount-Pelié: empr. de Hamelin fraire, p. 24
- Aleissandrino Bremound (1887), Mme Joseph Gautier. Velo blanco, pouësio, Marseille: impr. de Trabuc et Raviolo, p. 125
- Aleissandrino Bremound (1891), Brut de Canèu, pouësio, preface by Frederi Mistral (2 ed.), Marseille: journal franco-provençal "la Cornemuse", p. 136
- Aleissandrino Bremound (1908), Lou debanaire flouri, Avignon: éd. Roumanille
- Aleissandrino Bremound (2012), Color femna, Montpellier: CRDP Académie de Montpellier, p. 56

== Sources ==
- "Armana Prouvencau", Armana prouvençau pèr lou bèl an de Diéu (in Occitan), Avignon: Enco de Roumanille, Libraire-Editour, 1886
- "Brémonde de Tarascon (1858-1898), poétesse provençale", GénéProvence (in French), 10 December 2008
- Grands jeux floraux et reines du Félibrige (in French), Le Felibrige
- "Le Félibrige", La Plume (in French), 1891
- Fourié, Jean (2009). Dictionnaire des auteurs de langue d'oc de 1800 à nos jours (in French). Felibrige Edicioun. ISBN 978-2-9533591-0-7.
- Mistral, Frédéric (Neveu) (1924), ... Et nous verrons Berre : Pages de doctrine et de critique félibréennes (PDF) (in French), Aix-en-Provence: Éditions du Feu, archived from the original (PDF) on 2011-02-24
- "monument à la Brémonde de Tarascon", Patrimages (in French), Ministère de la Culture et de la Communication, 2015
- "Place Alexandrine Brémond", My Provence (in French)
