= Fontvieille =

Fontvieille may refer to:

- Fontvieille, Bouches-du-Rhône, a commune in the French Bouches-du-Rhône department
- Fontvieille, Monaco, a community within Monaco consisting of land reclaimed from the Mediterranean Sea
