= Nephew (disambiguation) =

A nephew is a son of a sibling.

Nephew may also refer to:

== Arts, entertainment, and media ==
- Nephew (band), a Danish rock band
- Nephew (book), a 2024 memoir by M. K. Asante
- "Nephew" (song), a 2018 rap song by Smokepurpp
- The Nephew, a 1998 drama film

== People ==
- Nephew Tommy (born 1967), American comedian
- Jasper Nephew, 21st-century guitarist for Owl City
- John Nephew, American game designer
- Neil Nephew (1939–1978), American actor
- Richard Nephew, 21st-century American nuclear weapons expert
- Francisco de Montejo (the Nephew) (1514–1572; Francisco de Montejo, el Sobrino), Spanish conquistador
- Robert Livingston the Younger (1663–1725; nicknamed "The Nephew"), New York politician
- William Tayloe (the nephew) (1645–1710), English planter in Virginia

== See also ==
- Cardinal-nephew of the Roman Catholic Church
- Second nephew in familial relations
- Frédéric Mistral (great-nephew) (1893-1968) French linguist and lawyer
- Guillaume Durand (nephew) (died 1330; "Guillaum Durand, le neveu") French clergyman
- William of Bitton (nephew) (died 1274; "William of Bitton, the nephew") Bishop of Bath and Wells
- Great Nephew, a British racehorse
- Nefew, a hip hop group from Switzerland
