= Saint-Antoine-de-Padoue Church, Paris =

Saint-Antoine-de-Padoue Church
- Église Saint-Antoine-de-Padoue
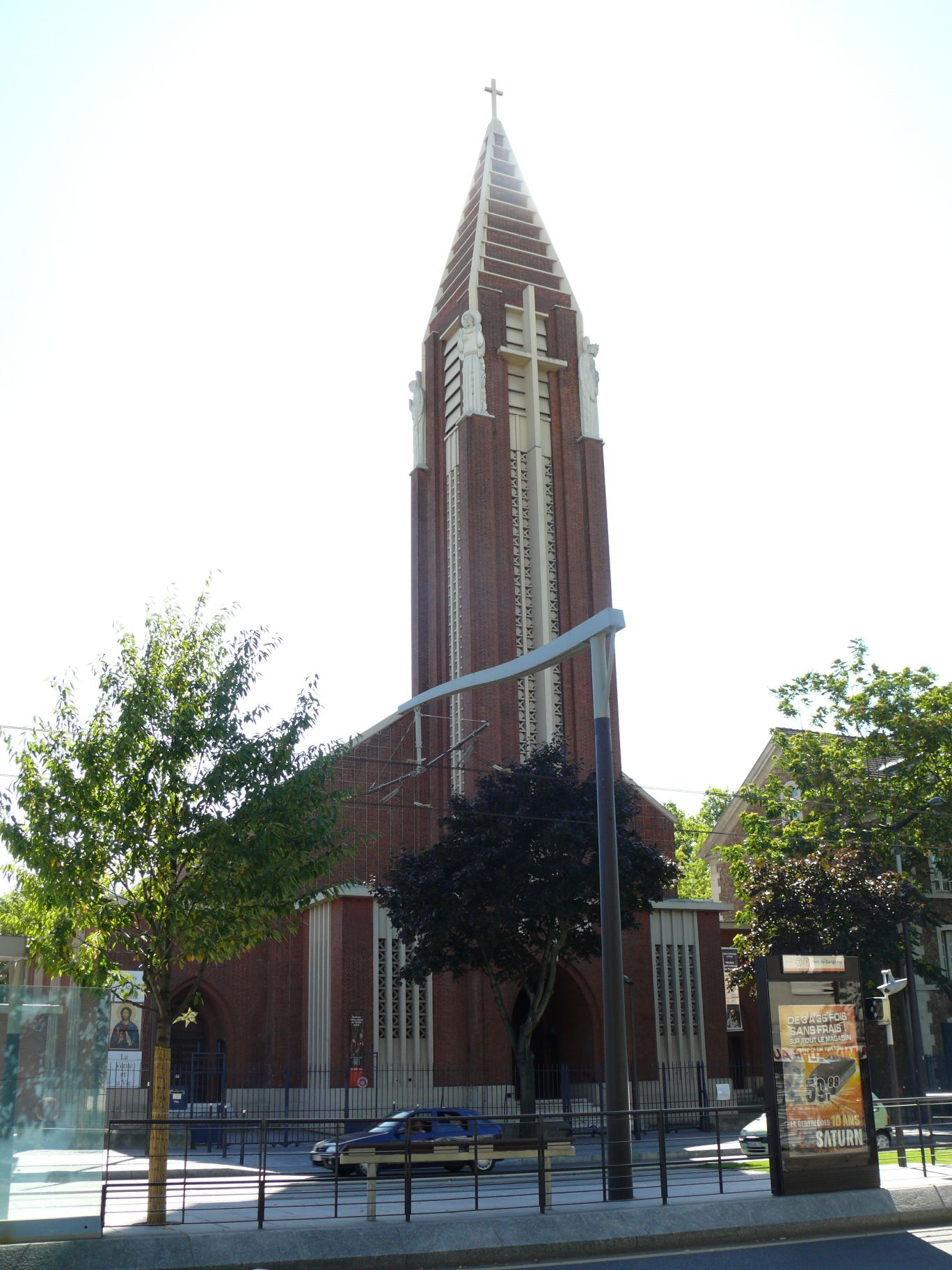
- Saint-Antoine-de-Padoue Church
- 48°49′47″N 2°17′40″E
- Location: Boulevard Lefebvre, 15th arrondissement of Paris
- Country: France
- Denomination: Roman Catholic

History
- Status: Parish church

Architecture
- Functional status: Active
- Architect: Emile Brunet
- Style: Art Deco
- Completed: 1935

Administration
- Archdiocese: Paris
- Parish: Saint-Leon, Paris

The Church of Saint-Antoine-de-Padoue (Eng. Saint Anthony of Padua) is a Roman Catholic church located on Boulevard Lefebvre in the 15th arrondissement of Paris. Built by architect Leon Azema between 1933 and 1935, it is one of the best examples of Art Deco architecture and interior design in Paris.

== History ==
The Commune of Vaugirard, which included a section of the fortified walls of Paris and many small villages and farms, was annexed to the city in 1860 by Napoleon III. The architect was Leon Azema, assisted by the Robert Mortier, an aid to the Abbot, who assured that the design followed the Franciscan principles of simple lines and modest decoration.

== Exterior ==
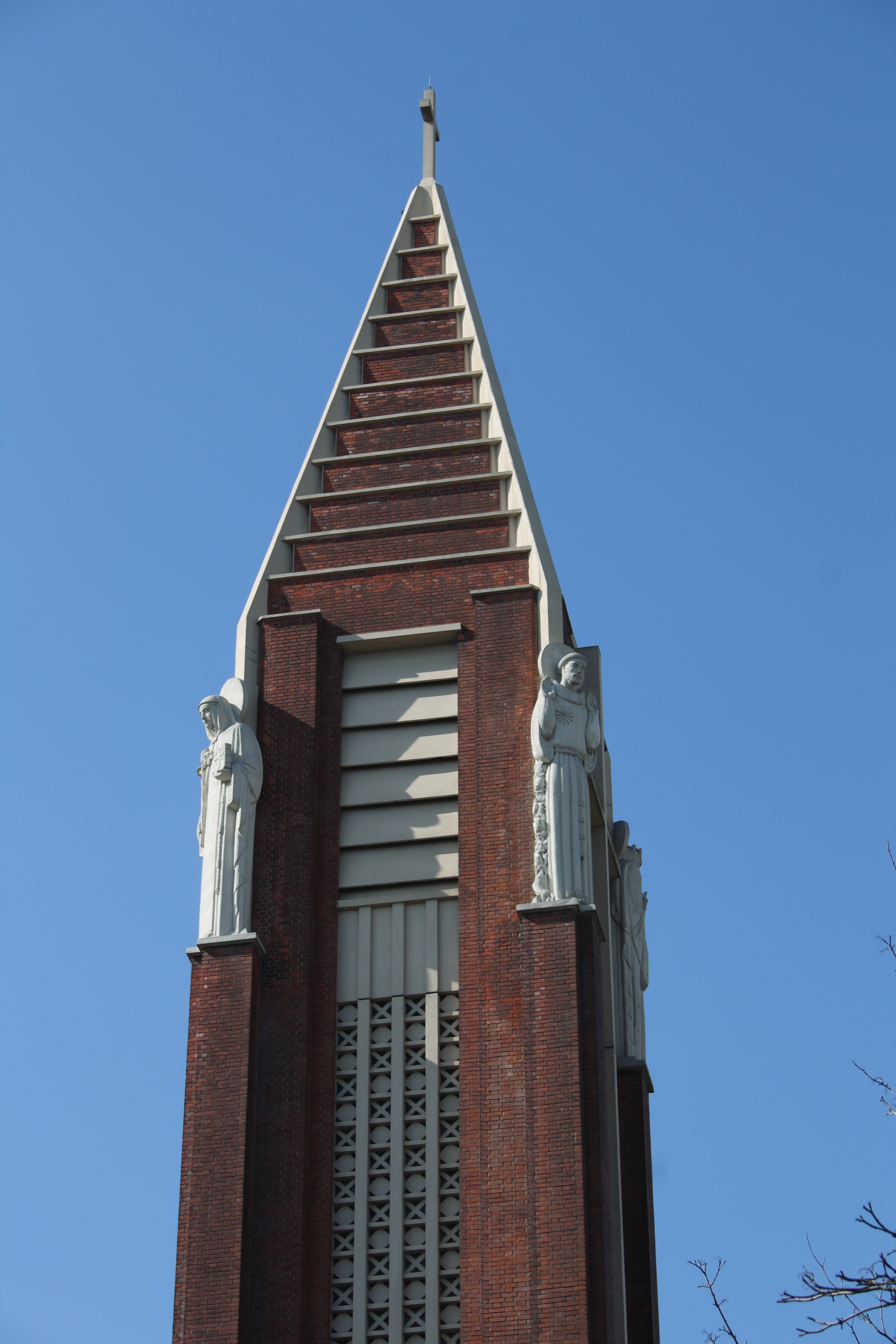
Bells tower with sculpture

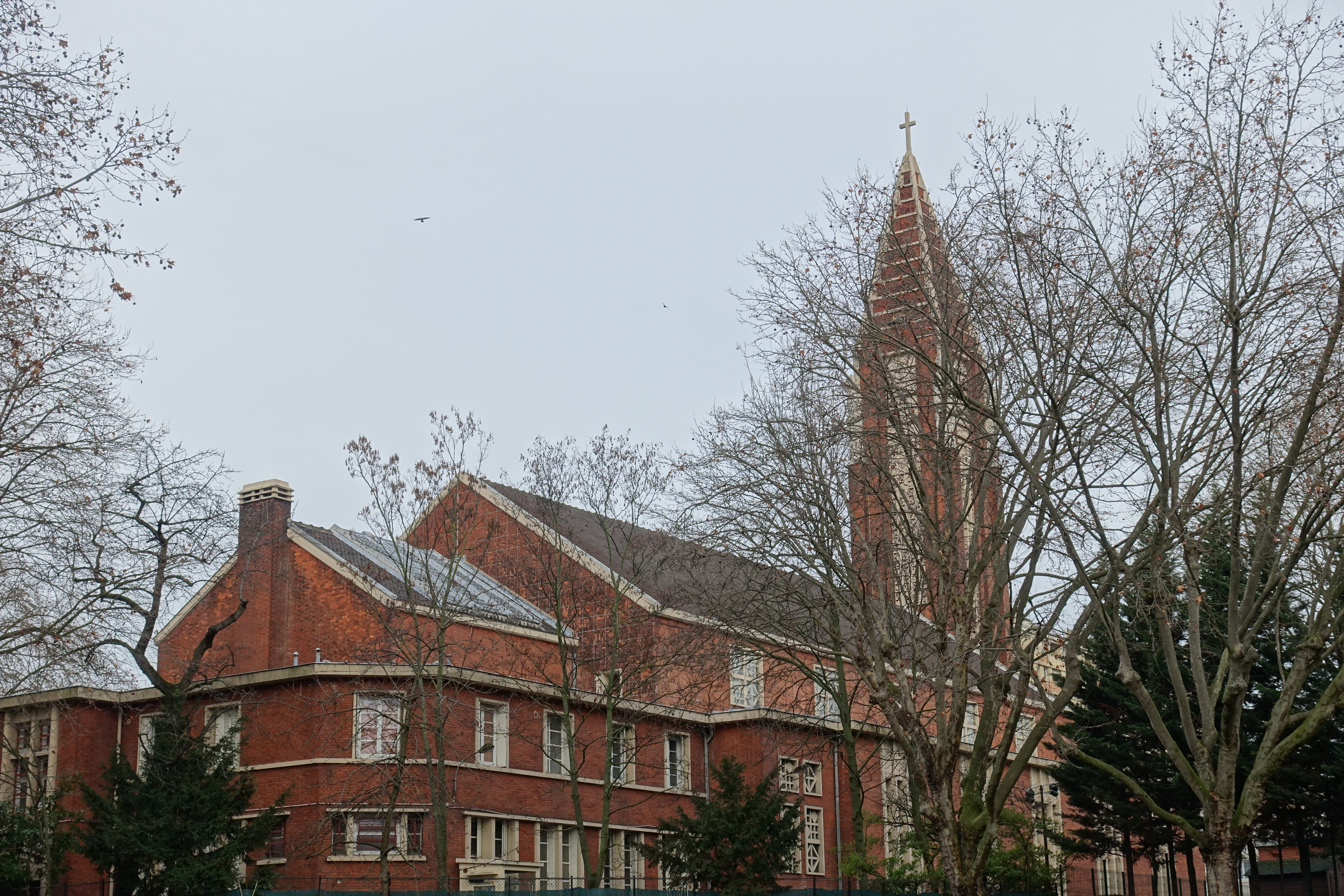
Rear of the church

The church is built of reinforced cement, covered on the outside with red bricks. The bell tower is 46 meters high, particularly visible in a neighborhood with low buildings.

The upper level of the bell tower is decoratewith four statues made by Raymond Delamarre (1890–1986) and Élie-Jean Vézien (1890–1982). They depict Saint Claire, co-founder of the order of the Clarisses; Saint Francis of Assisi, founder of the Franciscans; Saint Louis, who founded the convents of the Franciscans, and Saint Elizabeth of Hungary, dressed in the habit of the Franciscans.

The walls over the portal have two additional smaller bas-reliefs which depict emblems of the Franciscans; the Tau, a symbol of the benediction practiced by the Francisans, and two crossed arms, one dressed (representing Saint Francis) before he became a saint), and one arm unclothed, representings the arm of Christ. Together they illustrate the poverty that is demanded of Franciscan monks.

== Interior ==
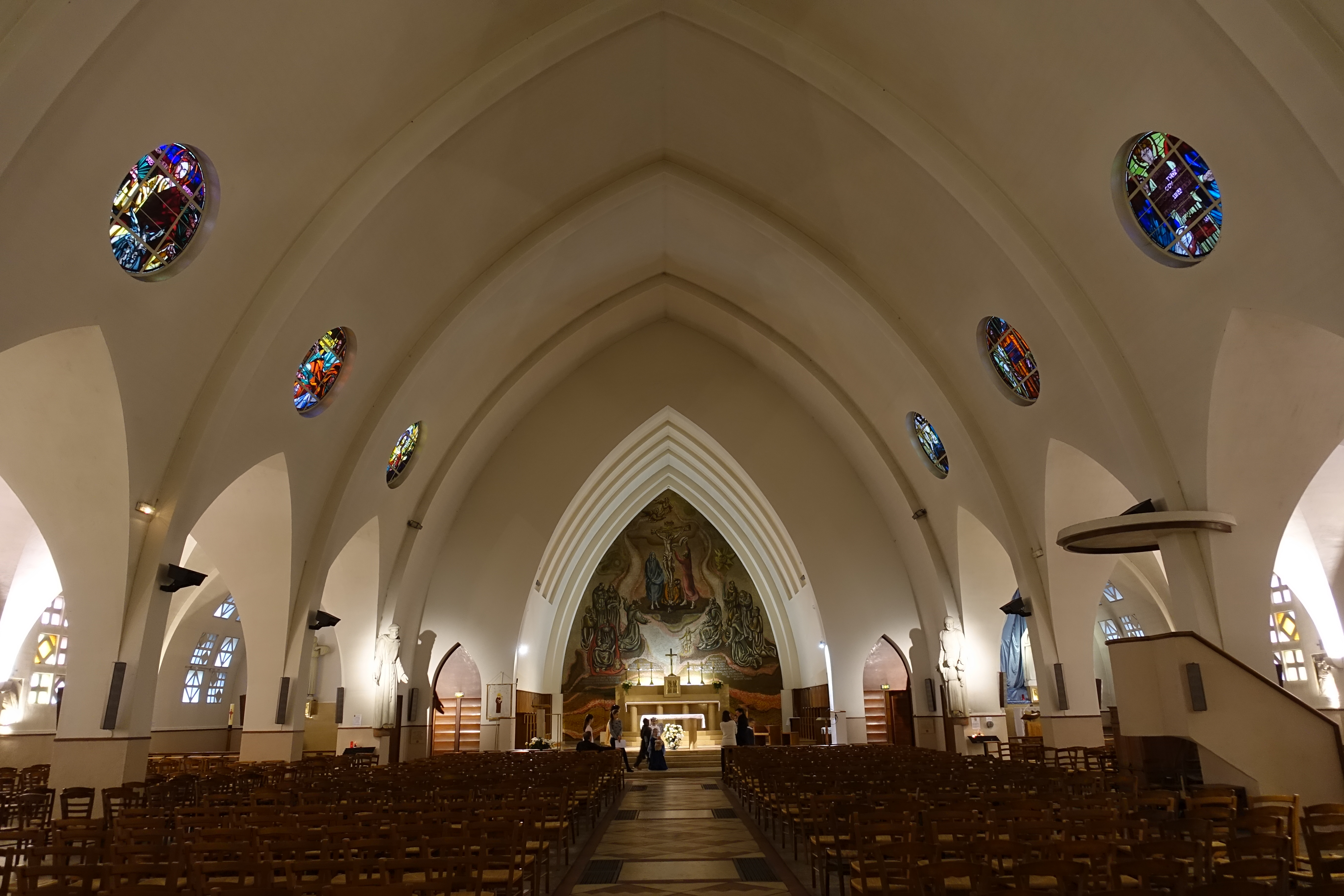
Nave facing the altar

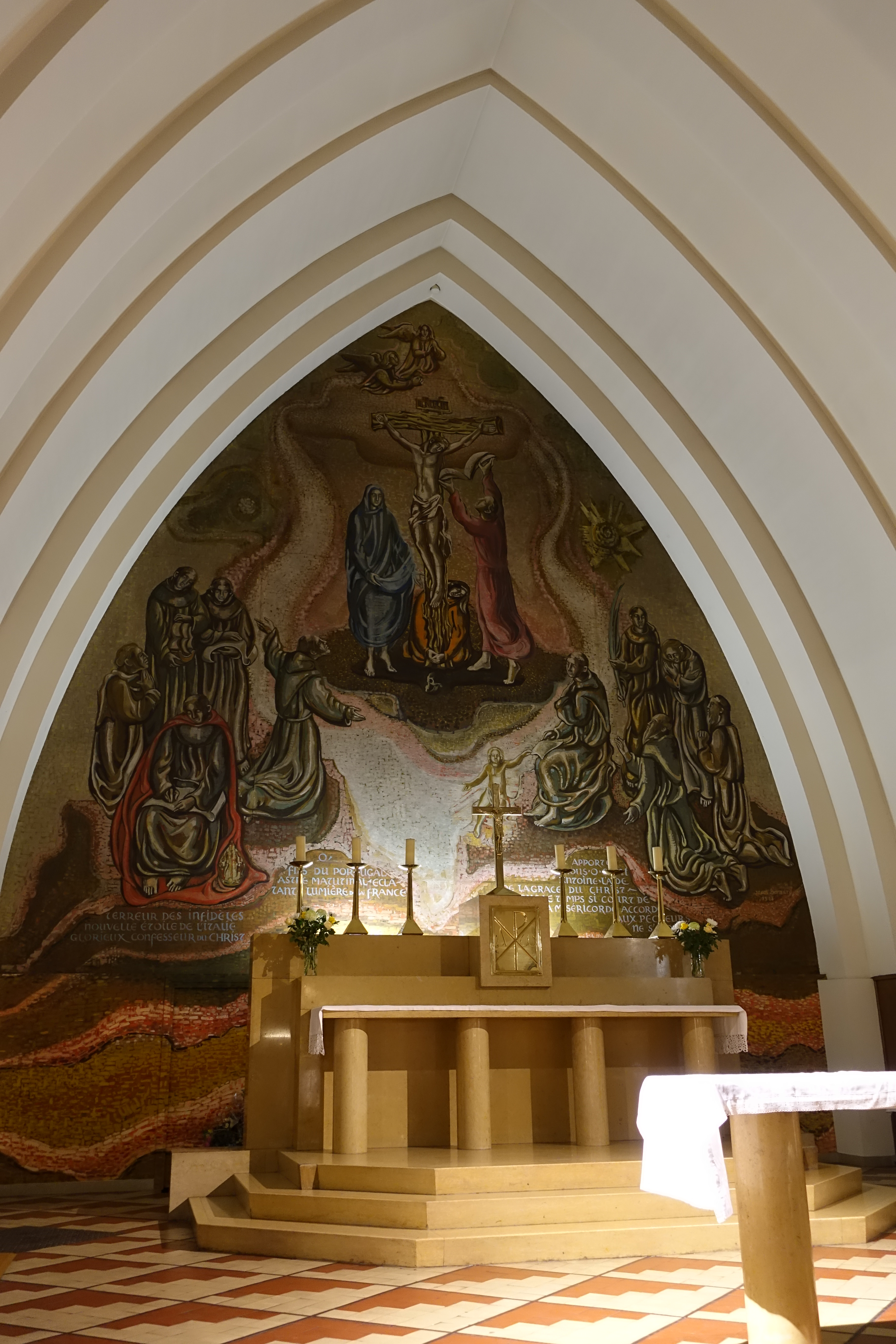
The altar and choir painting

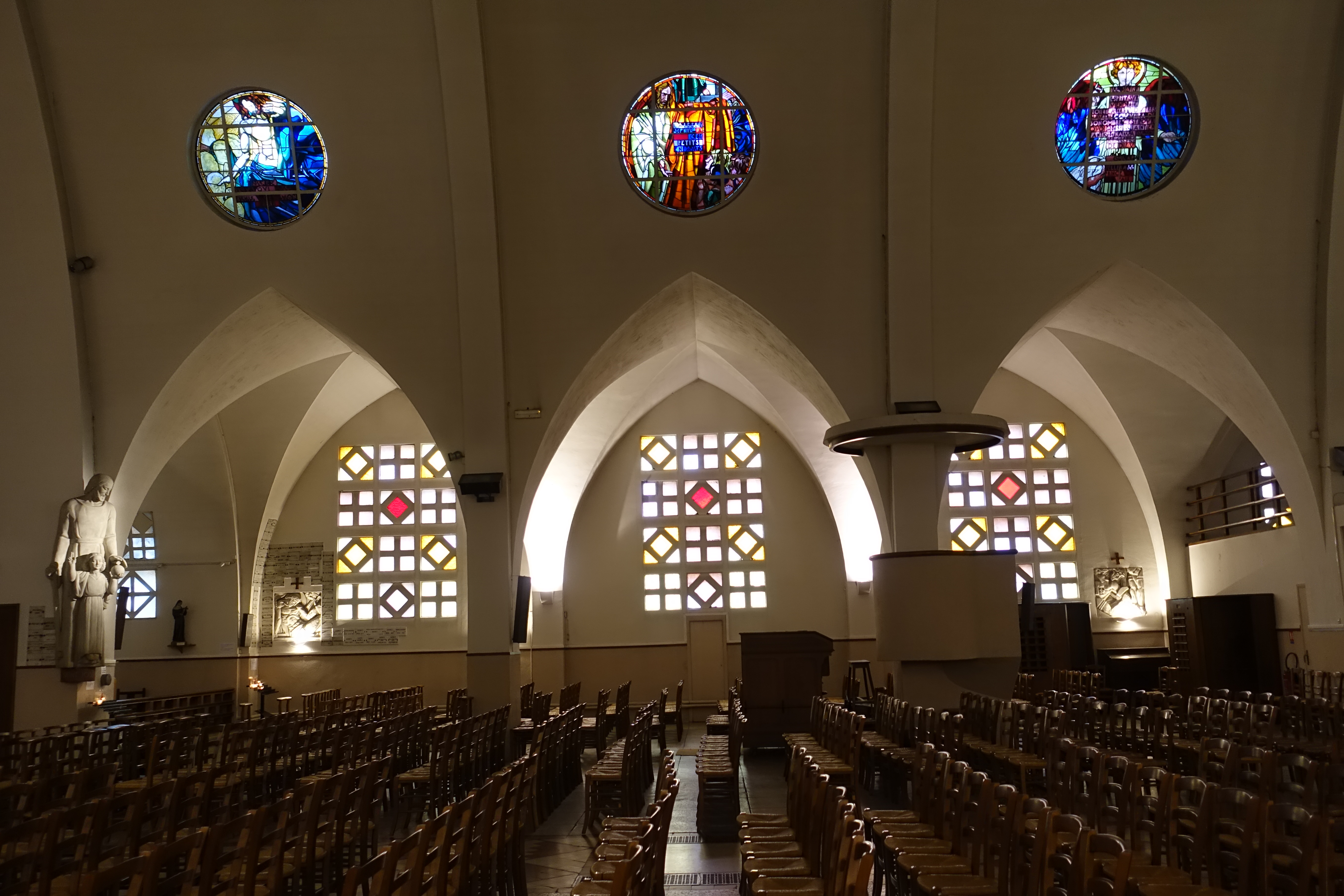
Side aisle of nave with circular oculi windows above

According to the historian Simon Texier, The painting in the choir behind the altar was intended to be the focus of attention in the church. The painting, by Jean-Fleury Bernard (1908-1944) shows Christ on the Cross, witnessed by Saint Mary, Saint John and Mary Madeline. However, later modifications to the Choir put the painting largely out of the light from the three windows and it difficult to see today.

The nave is lit on its upper level by rows of small circular stained glass windows. They were made by Louis Barillet (1880-1948_ from paintings by Robert Pougheon (1886-1955) The lower windows are of painted glass.

== Art and decoration ==
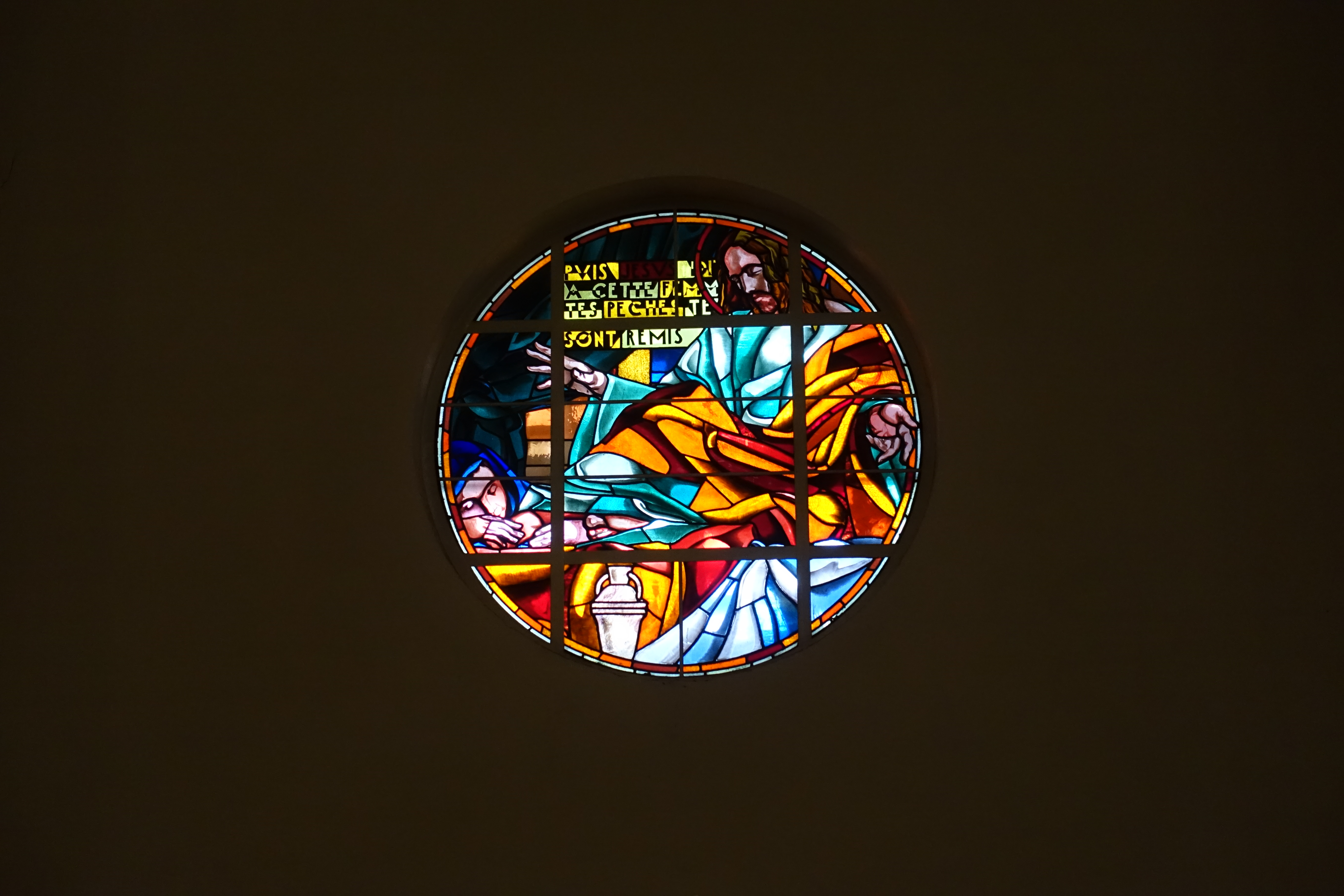
Oculus window of Saint Remy in the nave, by Louis Barrilet (1880-1948)

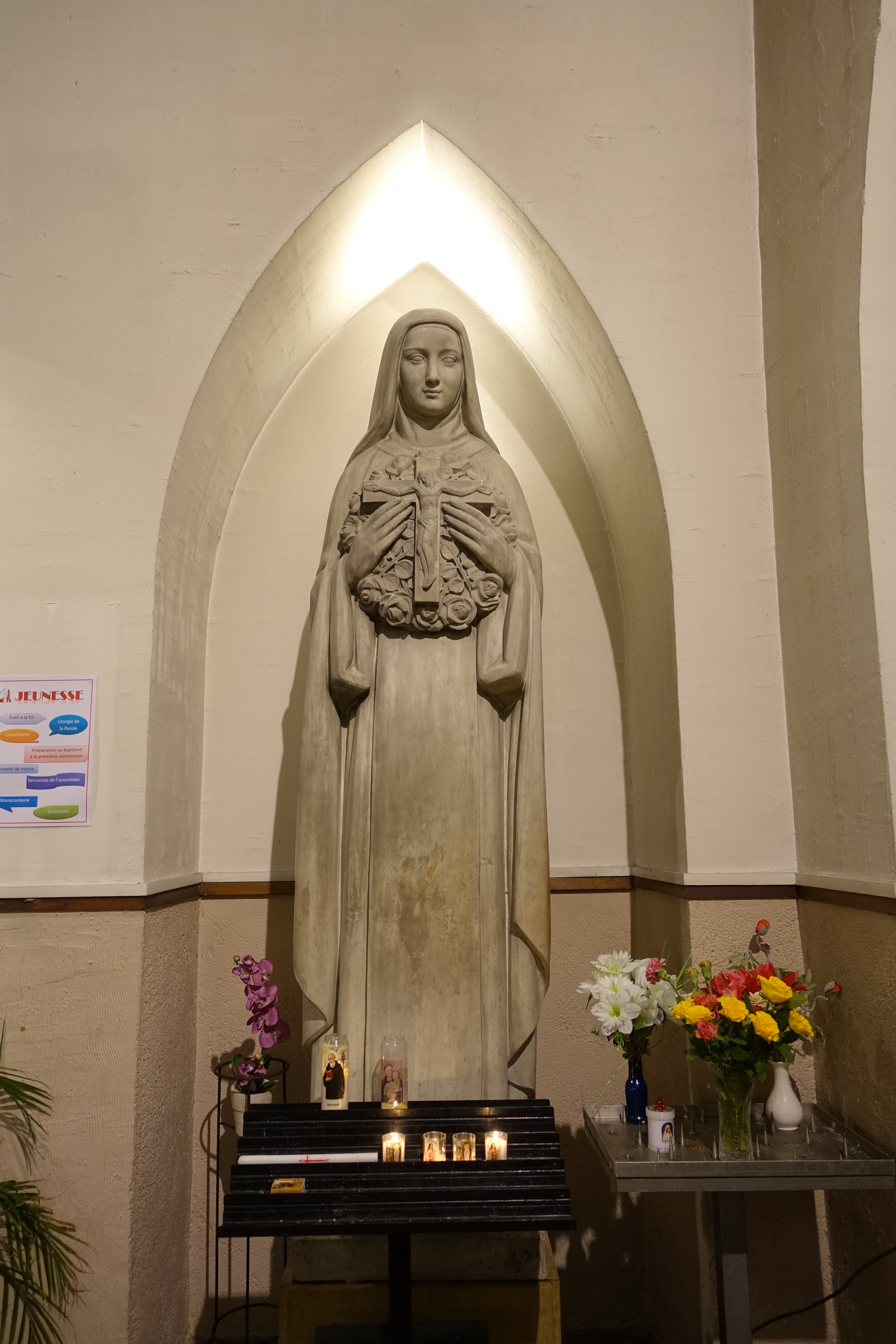
"Saint Therese de Lisieux" by Elle-Jean Vezien (1890-1982)

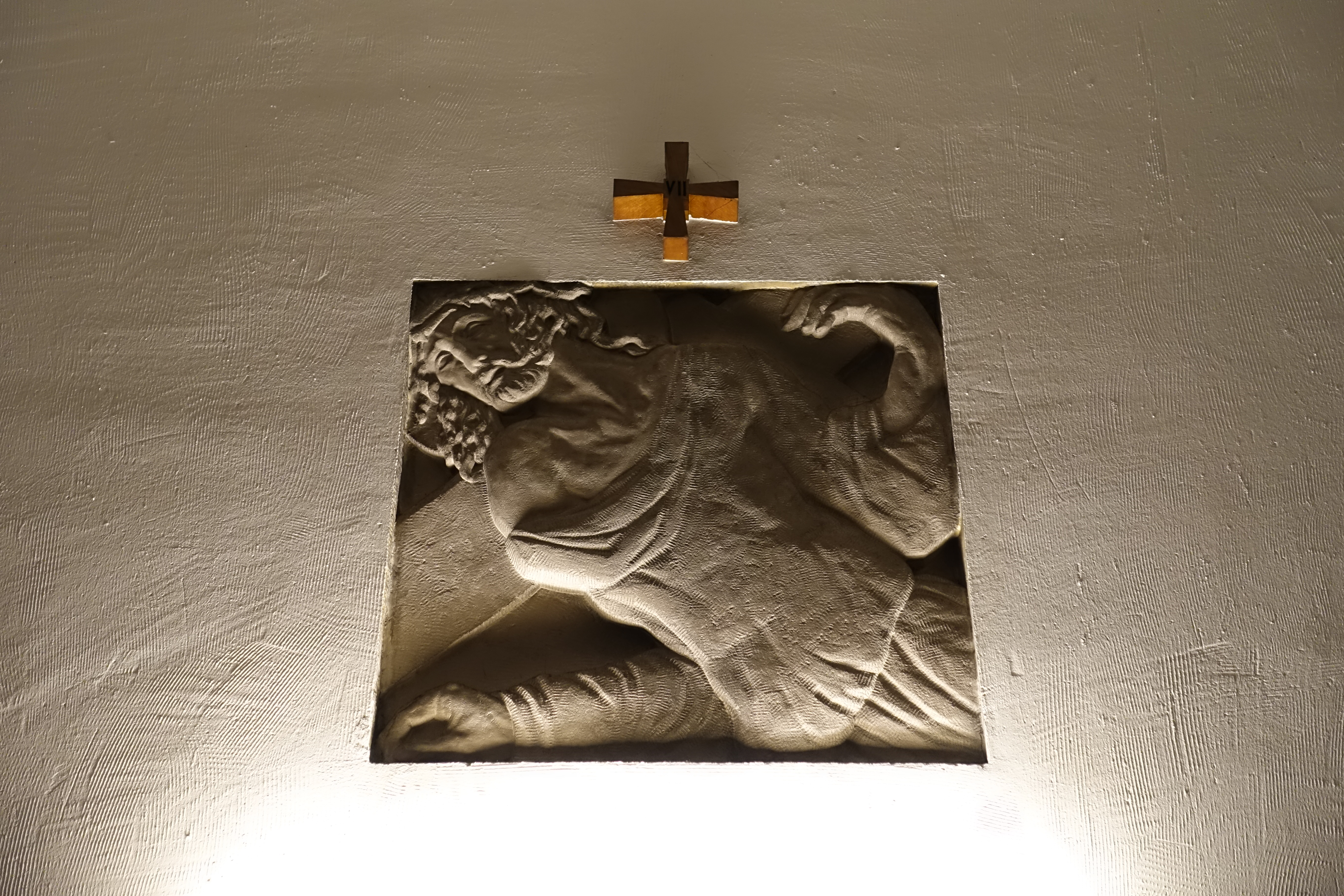
A Station of the Cross

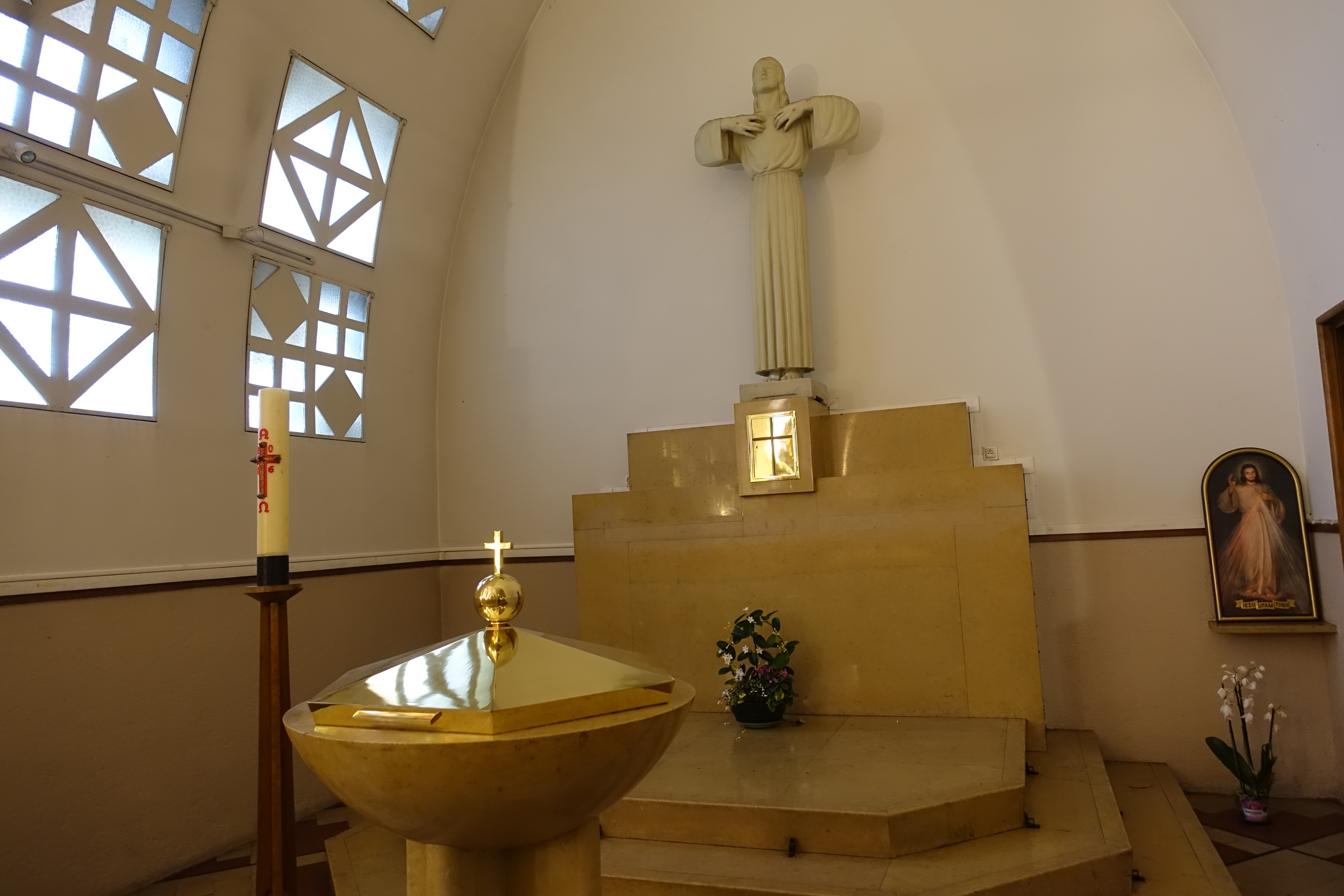
Chapel of Sacre Coeur, wih baptismal font. Statue of Salcre-Coeur by Raymond Delamarre (1890-1986)

== Organ ==
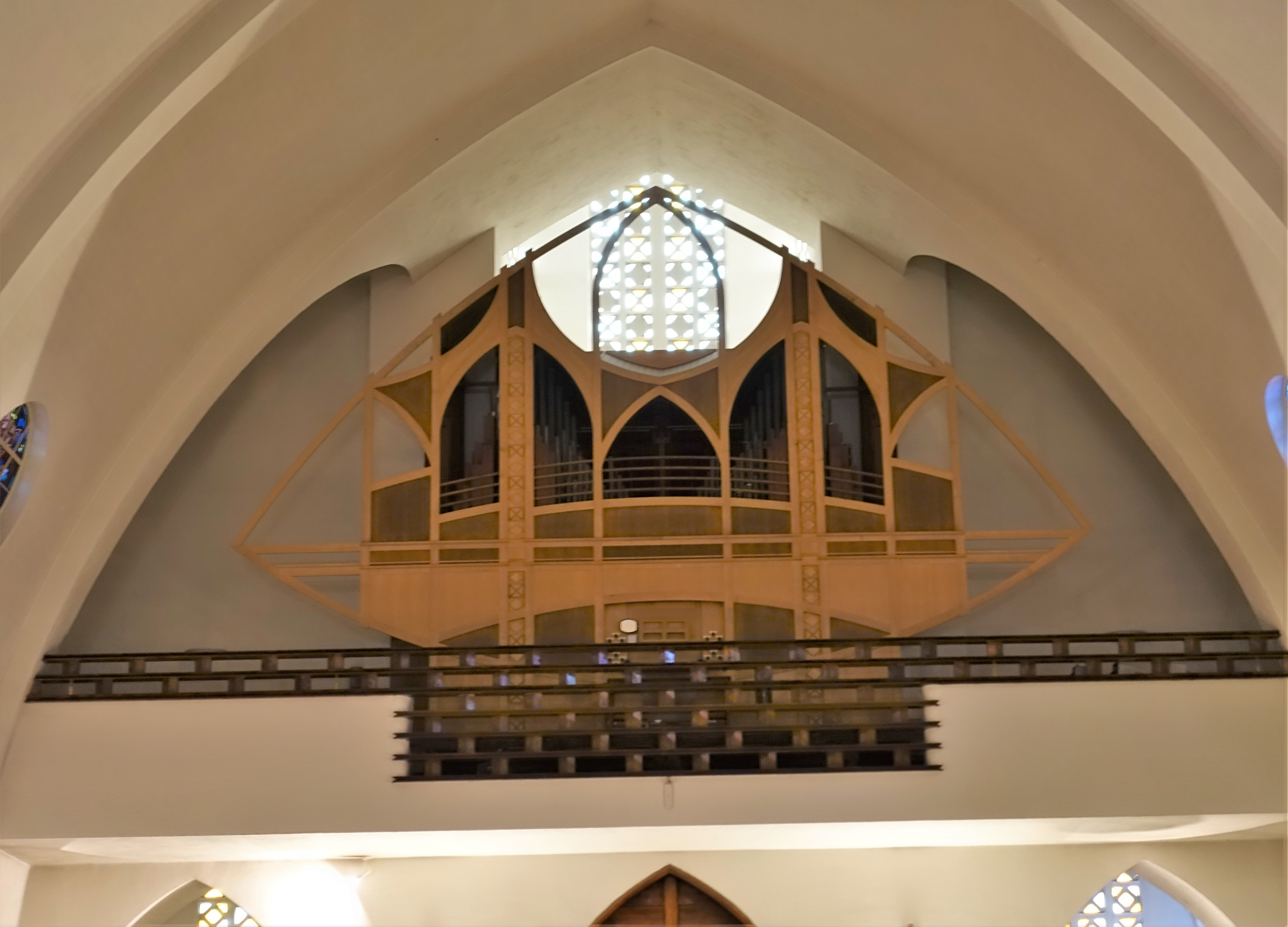
The organ in the tribune

The church organ is a recent instrument in a very modern case and setting located below the window of the tribune, above the entrance to the nave.
