= Jouveau =

Jouveau is a French surname. Notable people with the surname include:

- Gabriel Jouveau-Dubreuil (1851–1945), French archaeologist
- Marius Jouveau (1878–1949), French poet
- René Jouveau (1906–1997), French poet and non-fiction writer
