= List of works by Louis Botinelly =

This is a listing of the major works of Louis Botinelly, a French sculptor born in Digne on 2 January 1883 and died in Marseille on 26 March 1962. His father was a mason, originally from Tessin in Switzerland, who had a workshop in Digne before the family moved to Marseille when his father inherited a workshop there from his brother. Thanks to a bursary from the city of Marseille, Botinelly was able to stay in Italy for a period in 1902 and then study in Paris under Jules Coutan. He moved to Paris in 1906. In 1914 he was conscripted and joined the 7th Regiment of Engineers in Avignon. The huge demand for war memorials after 1918 meant that in the early 1920s he received many commissions for war memorial sculptures as evidenced in the listing below. In some records the sculptor's name is recorded as "Botinelli".

== Public monuments and memorials ==
Name	Location	Date	Notes
"Le Dresseur d'oursons"	Marseille	1911	This bronze depiction of a "bear trainer" is located on Marseille's Esplanade de la Tourette, facing the Église Saint-Laurent. Botinelly started work on this composition in 1909 and actually hired a bear named "Nenette" to ensure a true representation of the animal. A plaster version of the composition was shown at the Paris Salon of 1911. A bronze version was shown subsequently in 1913; the sculptor had difficulty in raising funds to pay a foundry to carry out the casting until his young wife managed to pay the costs. Finally, in 1927 the bronze was purchased by the city of Marseille.
"Atlantes" see Atlas (architecture)	Palais des arts du parc Chanot. Marseille	1922	For the "Exposition coloniale", an international fair held in Marseille in 1922, Botinelly was commissioned to add sculptural decoration to the " Palais de Marseille et des Arts de la Provence" building which was to become a museum devoted to "Vieux-Marseille" when the fair was over. He created two Atlantes to support the balcony of the building. A plaster model of one of these Atlantes was shown at the 1922 Paris Salon.
"Tête d'enfant"	Musée Cantini Marseille.	1923	A sculpture in white marble.
"Les Colonies d'Asie" and "Les Colonies d'Afrique"	La gare Saint-Charles de Marseille	1923 to 1924	This main railway station has a large flight of stairs designed by the architects Eugène Sénès and Léon Arnal and using reinforced concrete. The competition for the designs of the stairway, intended to improve movement between the town centre and the railway station forecourt, was opened in 1911 but the 1914-1918 war delayed completion of the project until 1925. The stairs run from the railway station to the Boulevard d'Athènes. The area is the site of much sculptural work including a group of lions and children by Arry Bitter and the works "Marseille Colonie Grecque" and "Marseille Porte d'Orient" by Auguste Carli. There are also six small bronze groups representing the produce of Provence. These are by Henri Raybaud and cover "les vendages", "les fruits", "la pêche", "les fleurs", "la moisson" and "la chasse". At the bottom of either side of the main stairs are two large sculptures by Botinelly. One, called "Colonies d'Asie" represents colonial Asia and the other, called "Colonies d'Afrique", represents colonial Africa.
Monument to Louis Capazza and Alphonse Fondère	Marseille	1930	On the 14 November 1886 Capazza and Fondère became the first men to cross the Mediterranean sea in a balloon travelling from Marseille to Appietto in Corsica.The architect Gaston Castel and the sculptor Botinelly were commissioned to create this ornate plaque in their honour. The commission came from the French Air Ministry, the "Conseil Général" of the Bouches du Rhône, the Aéro-club de France and the municipalities of Ajaccio, Bastia and Marseille. The inauguration took place on 16 November 1930, the unveiling performed by the aviators Dieudonné Costes and Maurice Bellonte.
Monument to Charles Rieu aka Charloun Rieu	Les Baux-de-Provence	1930	This monument located on Les Baux-de-Provence's Esplanade du château commemorates the Provence farmer and poet. It stands on a rocky promontory facing the Baux plain. At the back of the monument there is a bas-relief depicting the shepherds of Baux whilst at the front a bust of Rieu has further bas-reliefs on either side. That to the left of the bust is called "li proumieri viouleto" and depicts a young girl from Arles sniffing a bouquet of flowers and that to the right, called "li pastre di Baus" depicts a young shepherd standing at a church door holding a lamb in his arms.
Bust of Frédéric Mistral	Jardin botanique du Palais Longchamp. Marseille	1932	Mistral's bust sits on top of a pedestal which has a bas-relief depicting "Mireille" (Mirèio), Mistral's famous creation.
"Le Génie de la sculpture grecque"	14 rue Buffon. Marseille	1933	This bas-relief decorates Botinelly's old studio in the rue Buffon.
"La Loi et la Justice protégeant le Droit"	Tribunal de Commerce Marseille	1933	This sculpture was carved from Senozan stone. The building is located in Marseille's rue Émile Pollack and the sculpture is located in the "Salon d'honneur". The designing architect was Gaston Castel. In Botinelly's composition the figure of "le Droit" stands between two female allegories representing " la Loi" and "la Vérité".
Monument commemorating Alexander Ist of Yugoslavia and Louis Barthou	Marseille	1938	This monument, carved from Lens stone, commemorates the assassination in Marseille of the Yugoslavian king and Bathou in 1934 and was given the name "Paix et Travail" by the designing architect Gaston Castel who used the services of the sculptors Antonio Sartorio, Elie-Jean Vézin and Botinelly. The inauguration took place in 1941. Two columns support a shield flanked by female allegories of Yugoslavia and France. The columns bear several bas-reliefs. The column on the right hand side has bas-reliefs by Élie-Jean Vézien which depict scenes associated with France whilst the left side column has Botinelly bas-reliefs depicting scenes from Yugoslavia. At the front of the monuments, medallions depicting the two victims are held by allegories by Sartorio representing "La Justice", "Le Droit", "La Liberté" et "Le Travail". The monument stands on the corner of the Rue de Rome and the Avenue Paul Peytral in Marseille's 6th arrondissement. The Musée d'histoire de la Ville de Marseille hold the design drawings and the plaster maquette which was shown at the agricultural section of the Paris Salon and won the gold prize.
"Méditerranée"	Marseille.	1940	This composition can be seen in Marseille's Mairie.
"Labour en Provence"	Present whereabouts not known.	1947	Botinelly was a regular exhibitor at the annual Paris Salon and this composition was his submission for the year 1947.
"Nul bien sans peine"	L'île de Bendor near Bandol	1950	Paul Ricard purchased this island in 1950 and commissioned Botinelly to execute a statue paying homage to the sculptor Pierre Puget. Botinelly called his work "nul bien sans peine".
"La Mer et La Camargue"	Marseille	1951	Intricate bas-reliefs surround the two entrances of a building in Marseille's Rue de la Loge.
"Le Docker"	Bourse du travail Marseille	1936	The Labour Exchange at 23 boulevard Charles-Nédélec in the Saint-Charles district of Marseille sports two reliefs on its façade. "Le Docker" is by Botinelly and "Le conducteur de tracteur" is by Raymond Servian. The building was designed by the architect Eugène Sénès who was one of the designing architects for the great staircase by Marseille's railway station another project which used Botinelly's sculptural skills.
Monument to Auguste and Louis Lumière	La Ciotat		In the Boulevard Beau Rivage on the La Ciotat seafront is this monument dedicated to the memory of the Lumière brothers who played an important role in the history of film making.
The tomb of Louis Henry	Saint-Pierre cemetery. Marseille		Botinelly executed a depiction of a grieving woman for the tomb of Henry who was killed in 1915 fighting at Souain in the Marne.

== Works in cathedrals and churches ==
Name	Location	Date	Notes
La cathédrale Sainte-Marie-Majeure (Marseille Cathedral)	Marseille	1935 to 1937	Botinelly executed statues of the four apostles for the Cathedral.
"Sainte Thérèse de l'Enfant Jésus et de la Sainte Face"	Marseille. Église Saint-Vincent-de-Paul (known as the "Église des Réformés")	1931 and 1943	This 1931 work was carved from Brouzet stone. There is also a Botinelly statue of Christ in the church, this based on the Turin shroud image and on the church's forecourt is his 1943 statue of Joan of Arc. This statue stands on a pedestal decorated with four reliefs by Botinelly- "La Levée du siége d'Orléans", "Jeanne d'Arc et Charles VII", "Le Sacre de Charles VII" and "Le Martyre de Jeanne d'Arc". The statue was "blessed" on the 19 May 1943 by Monseigneur Delay, the Bishop of Marseille.
"Pietà"	Basilique du Sacré-Cœur de Marseille	1948	This work can be seen in the Basilique's chapelle de Notre-Dame de Pitié. When working as a student with Jules Coutan in Paris, Botinelly assisted Coutan with his work on the Sacré-Coeur Pietà in Montmartre. Botinelly also sculpted a Pietà for the Cathédrale Notre Dame de L'Assomption in Riez.
Statue du Sacré-Cœur	Église_Saint-Philippe_de_Marseille		This statue is in the church's transept. The church also has a Botinelly statue of St.Philippe.
Saint Bruno	Marseille. Église des Chartreux de Marseille (L’église Sainte-Marie-Madeleine des Chartreux)	1956	Statues of Mary Magdalene, St Bruno and St Anthony of Padua are located in this church.
L’Église Saint-Louis	Marseille		For this church Botinelly executed a bas-relief in Carrara marble depicting Sainte Fortunée.
Église Saint-Ferréol les Augustins	Marseille	1947	Botinelly's sculpture located in a side chapel depicts Joan "listening to her voices".

== War memorials ==
Name	Location	Date	Notes
La Belle de Mai War memorial (monument aux morts)	La Belle de Mai		This memorial stands in the Place Bernard Cadenat of this Marseille suburb.
Moustiers-Sainte-Marie War memorial (monument aux morts)	Moustiers-Sainte-Marie	1920	A helmeted woman stands on rocks. Next to her, a large rock bears the names of the dead.
Monument aux instituteurs bas-alpins morts pour la patrie	IUFM Iinstitut universitaire de formation des maitres Digne-les-Bains	1920	This monument in marble is located in the courtyard of the institute's building in 15 avenue Joseph Reinach. It comprises an obelisk with carvings of oak and olive leaves at the top. Two schoolchildren, a boy and a girl, stand before the obelisk and offer flowers in tribute to those men remembered; members of the institute who gave their lives in the 1914-1918 war.
Sisteron War memorial (monument aux morts)	Sisteron	1921	A female allegory for France holds aloft an olive branch. She is enveloped in an unfurling flag. The inscription reads "Aux enfants de Sisteron morts pour la France guerre 1914-1918" The monument stands in front of Sisteron's Notre Dame cathedral (Cathédrale Notre Dame des Pommiers et Saint Thyrse)
Digne-les-Bains War memorial (monument aux morts)	Rond-point du Onze Novembre. Digne-les-Bains	1922	This memorial to the dead of the 1914-1918 war can be seen in the centre of a roundabout as one enters the town. Botinelly had been born in Digne-les-Bains. In his composition a female figure, an allegory for France, comforts a dying French soldier who lays across her lap whilst she proudly holds an unfurling French national flag and to underline the sense of victory a German eagle lies at her feet. The figure stands on a pedestal which has a bas-relief showing soldiers fighting at the front guided and protected by a winged "angel of victory".
Monument in honour of the French resistance.	Aix-en-Provence		This monument remembering the French resistance stands in Saint-Pierre cemetery. A figure of a member of the resistance stands in front of a memorial in the form of a wall which is inscribed with the names of those who fought and lay down their lives fighting the Nazi forces and two bas-reliefs showing them in action fighting in a local wood.
Riez War memorial (monument aux morts)	Riez		The memorial consists of an obelisk at the top of which are helmets and a garland of oak leaves. In front of the obelisk stands a woman, an allegory for France. She is reading the inscription on the obelisk and holds a sprig of laurel. The names of two important battles of the war, the Somme and Verdun, are inscribed on the upper part of the obelisk.
Valréas War memorial (monument aux morts)	Valréas	1921	The memorial stands in Valréas' avenue Charles de Gaulle and consists of a statue and a small bas-relief. The inscription reads "Valréas à ses morts glorieux 1914, 1918" The limestone statue, an allegory for France, holds a draped flag and offers out a branch of laurel. The bas-relief depicts soldiers carrying a wounded comrade on a stretcher. Valréas war memorial
Avignon War memorial ("Monument aux morts du jardin des Doms")	Avignon	1924	This memorial is situated at the entry of the "jardin du rocher des Doms" by the Cathédrale Notre Dame des Doms. A 3-metre-high figure in Carrara marble, an allegory for "Souvenir" (remembrance), dominates the memorial which is completed by two bas-reliefs. One depicts a dead soldier being buried at the front by his comrades and another depicts "grief"; a woman kneels before a dead soldier. It was inaugurated at a ceremony on 11 November 1924 officiated by Edouard Daladier and François Albert. Monument aux morts du jardin des Doms
