= Élie-Jean Vézien =

French sculptor and engraver

- Born: 18 July 1890; Marseille, Bouches-du-Rhône, France
- Died: 7 September 1982 (aged 92); Marseille, Bouches-du-Rhône, France
- Occupation: Sculptor

Élie-Jean Vézien was a French sculptor, engraver and medallist, born in Marseille, France on 18 July 1890 and dying there on 7 September 1982.

== Biography ==
Vézien started work in 1904 as apprentice to a goldsmith in Marseille who taught him engraving. He was introduced to François Carli and was enrolled at the Marseille Ếcole des Beaux-Arts. In 1911 he won a bursary which allowed him to continue his studies in Paris, but he received his call-up for the French army which meant his departure for Paris was delayed. However his term of service was cut short, due it is said to the influence of Auguste Carli, and in May 1914 he sat the entrance examination for the Paris Ẻcole nationale supérieure des Beaux-Arts. He passed with flying colours and became a student of Jules Coutan. His stay at the college was however short-lived, and when in August 1914 war broke out, he was mobilized and back in uniform. He fought at Verdun, was wounded on 21 March 1916 and taken prisoner.

After the war he resumed his studies and won the "Prix de Rome" in 1921 with the bas-relief in plaster entitled "Les Fiançailles" and in the same year he made his debut at the Salon des Artistes Français and continued to exhibit there until 1937. He won several prizes at the Salon. In 1921 his composition "Le Printemps", a plaster bas-relief, saw him receive an "honourable mention" and in 1924 he won a silver medal with "L'Eveil". In 1931 he was awarded the Salon's gold medal.

He was appointed professor at the Marseille Beaux-Arts, then became the director there from 1942 to 1961, finally becoming an honorary director. His work was part of the sculpture event in the art competition at the 1932 Summer Olympics.

== Main works ==
1. Saint-Michel terrassant le dragon. This marble bas-relief, showing St Michael slaying the dragon, was completed in 1906 when Vézien was just 16 years of age. It can be seen in Marseille between the angle of the Rue des Trois-Frères-Barthélemy and the Rue de Tilsit.

2. Église Saint-Antoine-de-Padoue (Paris). The façade of this church was the work of the architect Léon Azéma who had won the Prix de Rome for architecture in 1921. The bell-tower is 46 metres high and is surmounted by a cement cross and is surrounded near the top by four 4.55 metre high statues. These are the works of Raymond Delamarre and Jean-Elie Vézien and depict the franciscain saints, St.Francis of Assisi and St Claire and King St.Louis and Queen St Elizabeth of Hungary. Inside the church are three statues by Vézien, these depicting the Virgin Mary with child in the "chapelle de la Vierge", a statue of Joseph presenting the child Jesus and a depiction of St Thérèse de Lisieux. Also working with Delamarre, Vézien completed the stations of the Cross in the church ("Chemin de croix").

3. Statue of St.Thérèse and the infant Jesus. This stone statue dates to around 1947 and is located in the Église Saint-Ferréol les Augustins in Marseille's Quai des Belges.

4. L'Ossuaire de Douaumont. Vézien completed several statues for the chapel in the Douaumont ossuary; Saint Joseph, Saint Theresa, the Sacré-Coeur, Joan of Arc and a Pietà. In Vézien's Pietà, Christ's body is unusually in the vertical position with arms spread. They join the arms of the Virgin Mary, both forming a large cross. The Douaumont ossuary and cemetery is arguably one of the most important of France's many memorials to the dead of the Great War and it is a measure of Vézien's standing that he was chosen to execute the sculptures for the chapel.

5. Monument to Pierre-Antoine Berryer in Marseille. The original monument was inaugurated on 25 April 1875 and the sculpture was the work of Jean-Auguste Barré. However, in 1943, the statue was requisitioned and the bronze melted down for use in the war. Vézien was commissioned to produce a replica which was inaugurated on the 29 February 1948.

6. Monument to Gustave Ganay. Ganay was a celebrated French cyclist of the 1920s. He is buried in the Saint-Pierre cemetery and Marseille honoured him by giving his name to a boulevard.. Also one of the four stands in the Marseille Stade Vélodrome bears his name.

7. Palais de Chaillot. Vézien created the bas-relief "La Peinture" as part of the decoration of the Palais de Chaillot. In the bas-relief a painter is shown at work surrounded by a man and a woman whose beauty he will attempt to capture in his work. The inscription in Greek, "KALLOS" (beauty, reminds him of his task.

8. Statue of Cardinal Lavigerie. In 1925 the French governor of Tunisia, Lucien Saint wished to celebrate Lavigerie's centenary and commissioned Vézien to work on a suitable sculpture. Vézien's statue of Lavigerie was erected in Tunis and stood in the place Bab El Bhar. The statue depicted the cardinal brandishing a cross. The statue attracted much hostility from the Moslem majority in Tunis, particularly the students at Zitouna university and this led to violent demonstrations. The statue was withdrawn after Tunisia gained independence. The Tunisian politician Ali Belhouane played a role in the opposition to the statue.

10. Le Golfeur This small bronze by Vézien was cast by the Barbedienne foundry.

11. The bronze bust "Roi de Rome". In 1936 and on the occasion of the centenary of the death of Maria Letizia Ramolino, Napoléon 1st's mother, Vézien executed this bust which was erected in a small garden opposite the Napoleon residence in Ajaccio.

12. Statue of Bailli de Suffren in Saint Cannat. This statue by Vézien was erected in 1951.

13. Bust of Samuel de Champlain for the Musée du quai Branly This bust in plaster bears the sculptor's name on the left shoulder.

14. Monument commemorating Alexander 1st of Yugoslavia and Louis Barthou. This Marseille monument, dating to 1938, and carved from Lens stone, commemorates the assassination in Marseille of the Yugoslavian king and Bathou in 1934 and was given the name "Paix et Travail" by the designing architect Gaston Castel who used the services of the sculptors Antonio Sartorio, Elie-Jean Vézien and Louis Botinelly. Two columns support a shield flanked by female allegories of Yugoslavia and France. The columns bear several bas-reliefs. The column on the right hand side has bas-reliefs by Vézien which depict scenes associated with France whilst the left side column has Botinelly bas-reliefs depicting scenes from Yugoslavia. At the front of the monuments medallions depicting the two victims are held by allegories by Sartorio representing "La Justice", "Le Droit", "La Liberté" et "Le Travail". The monument stands on the corner of the Rue de Rome and the Avenue Paul Peytral in Marseille's 6th arrondissement. The Musée d'histoire de la Ville de Marseille hold the design drawings and the plaster maquette which was shown at the agricultural section of the Paris Salon and won the gold prize.

15. The Reconciliation. This 1935 work by Vézien can be seen in Paris' Square Saint-Laurent. 16. Bas-reliefs 28-30 Rue de la Loge. Marseille. Gaston Castel was this building's architect and in 1953 he commissioned Vézien to execute two bas-reliefs for the outside of the building.

17. Beaux-arts de Paris, l'école nationale supérieure. There are three Vézien works held in the Beaux-arts de Paris. "Douce rêverie", "Les Fiançailles" and a piece for the competition describing the required sculpture as one depicting war.

== Miscellaneous ==
Statue of Joan of Arc-Notre Dame de la Garde. In 1932 the catholic newspaper "L’Éveil provençal" announced that a large equestrian statue of Joan of Arc would be erected on the forecourt of the Notre Dame de la Garde church. Vézien was chosen to execute the sculpture and produced a maquette. The plan was that the bronze sculpture would be 7.50 metres high! In the event the statue was never produced. It was to be 10 years later that Marseille got her St Joan statue; in the event a modest work by Louis Botinelly.

== Vézien as medallist ==
Vézien was an accomplished medallist and his works include-

a. A medal honoring St. Thérèse (known as "The Little Flower") which is inscribed on the reverse with a quotation from her autobiography: "Je veux passer mon ciel a faire du bien sur la terre."

b. Commissioned to create a medal to celebrate the foundation of the city of Marseille, Vézien's medal depicted on one side the marriage of Protis and Gyptis and on the reverse side a view of the port in 1943 with the forts of Saint-Jean and Saint-Nicolas.

During the Second World War, Vézien won the French Mint's competition for designs of the new 10 and 20 franc coins. He also completed a variety of medals such as those dedicated to the professors Cornil, Tian, Roger and a medal celebrating the landing of the Allied Armies at Saint-Tropez.

== Gallery of Vézien's works ==
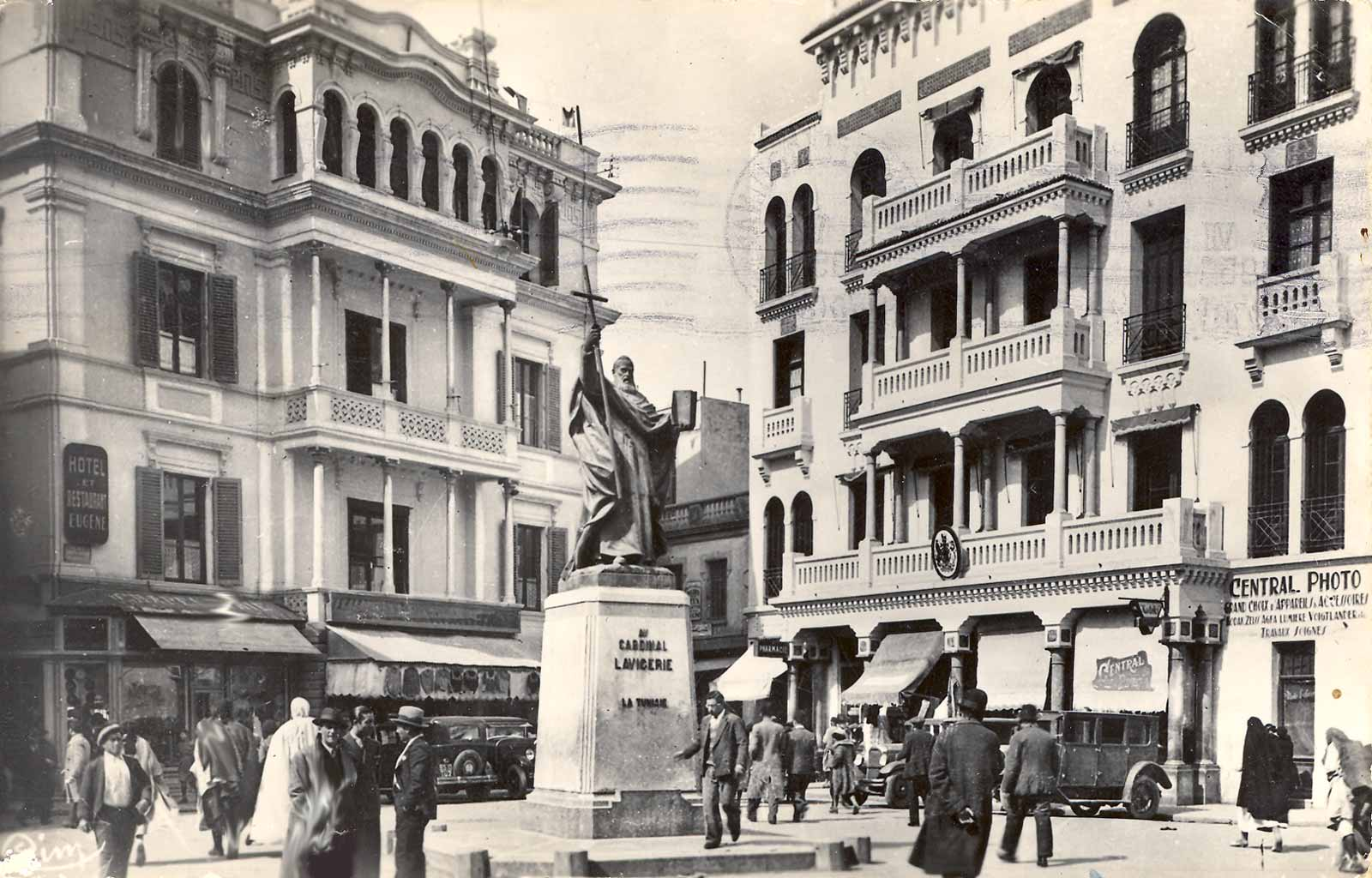
Statue of Cardinal Lavigerie in Tunis. Removed after Tunisia granted independence.

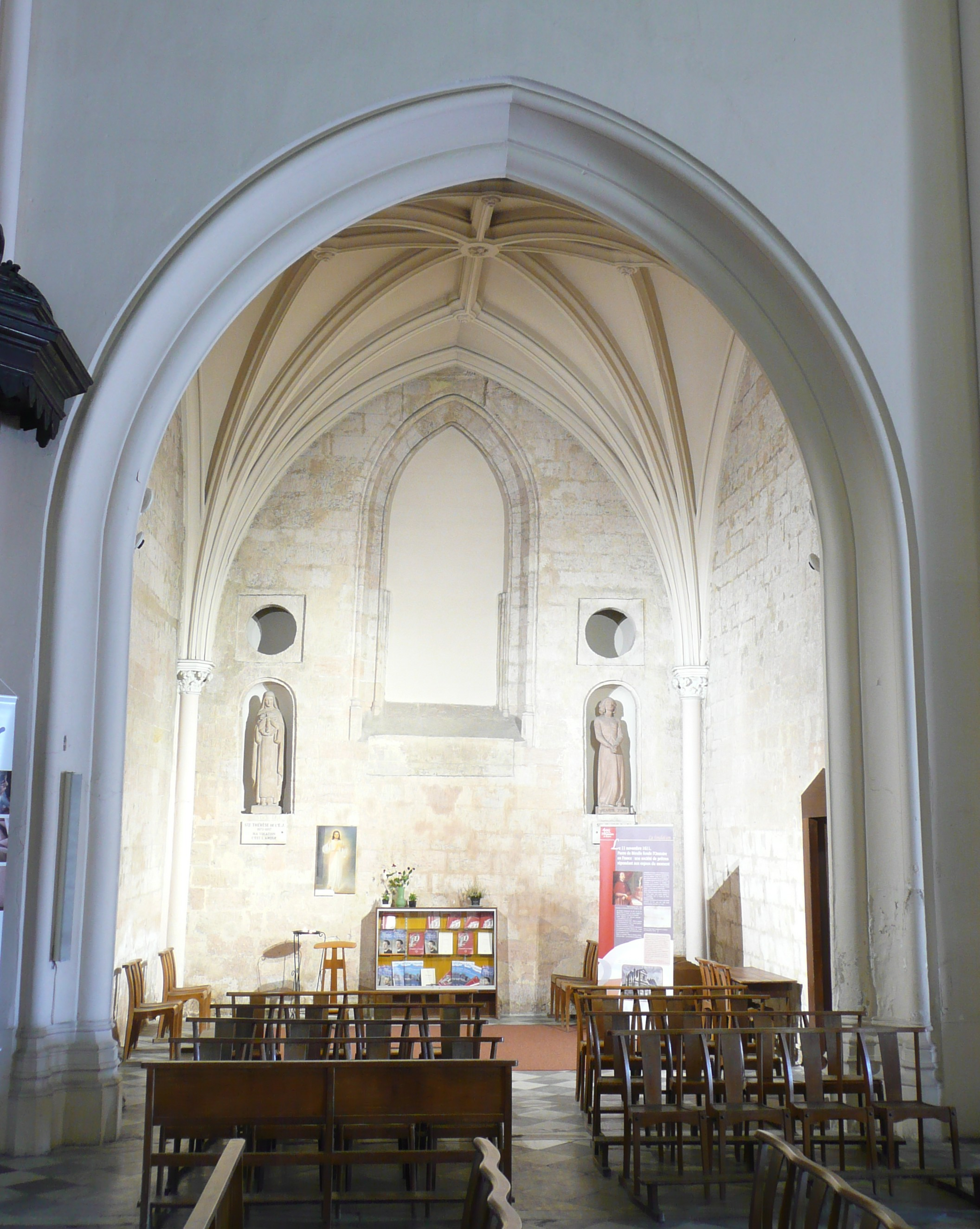
Vézien's statue can be seen to the left

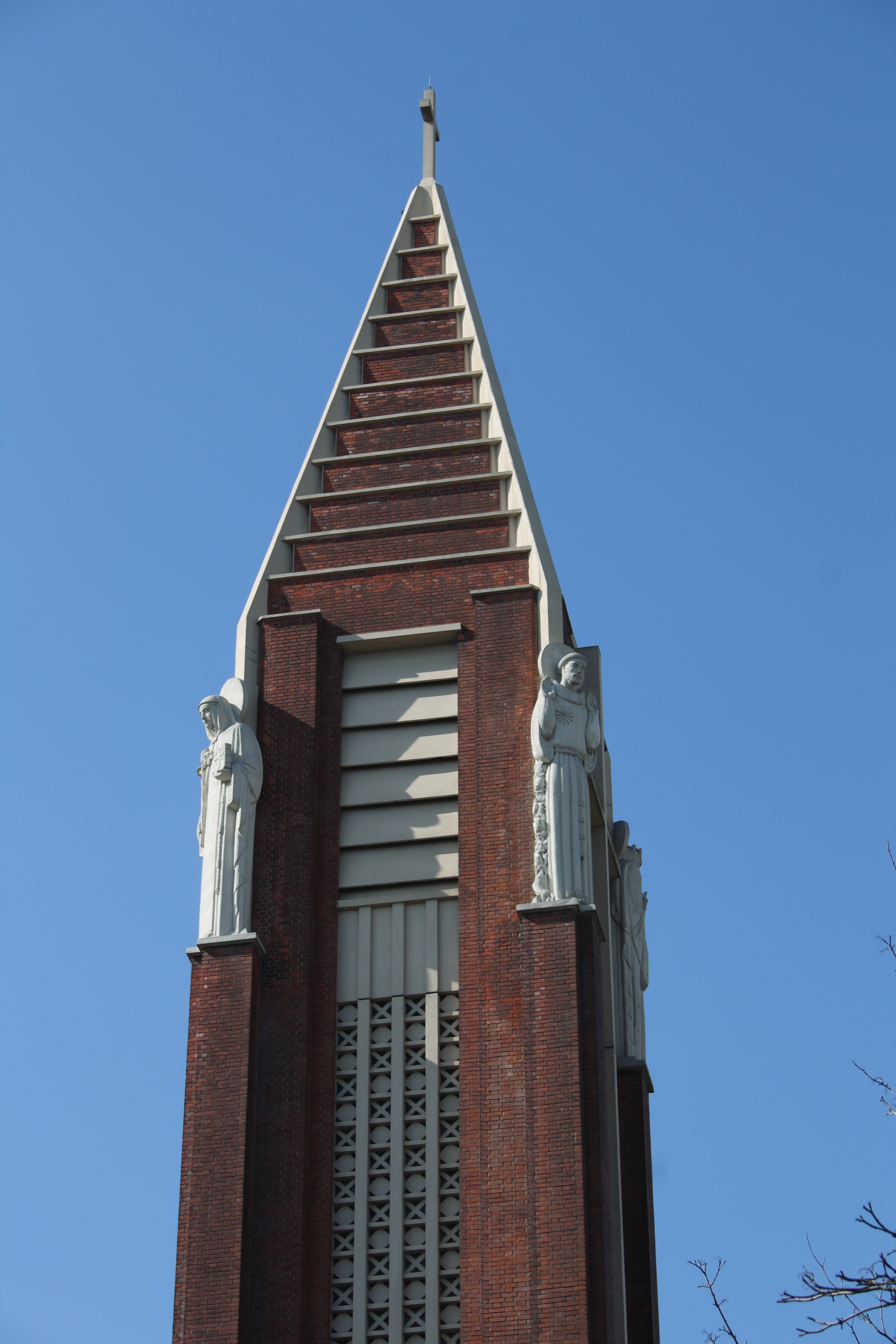
The bell-tower of the Église Saint-Antoine-de-Padoue. Two of the four statues of saints can be seen near the top.
