= Église Saint-Ferréol les Augustins =

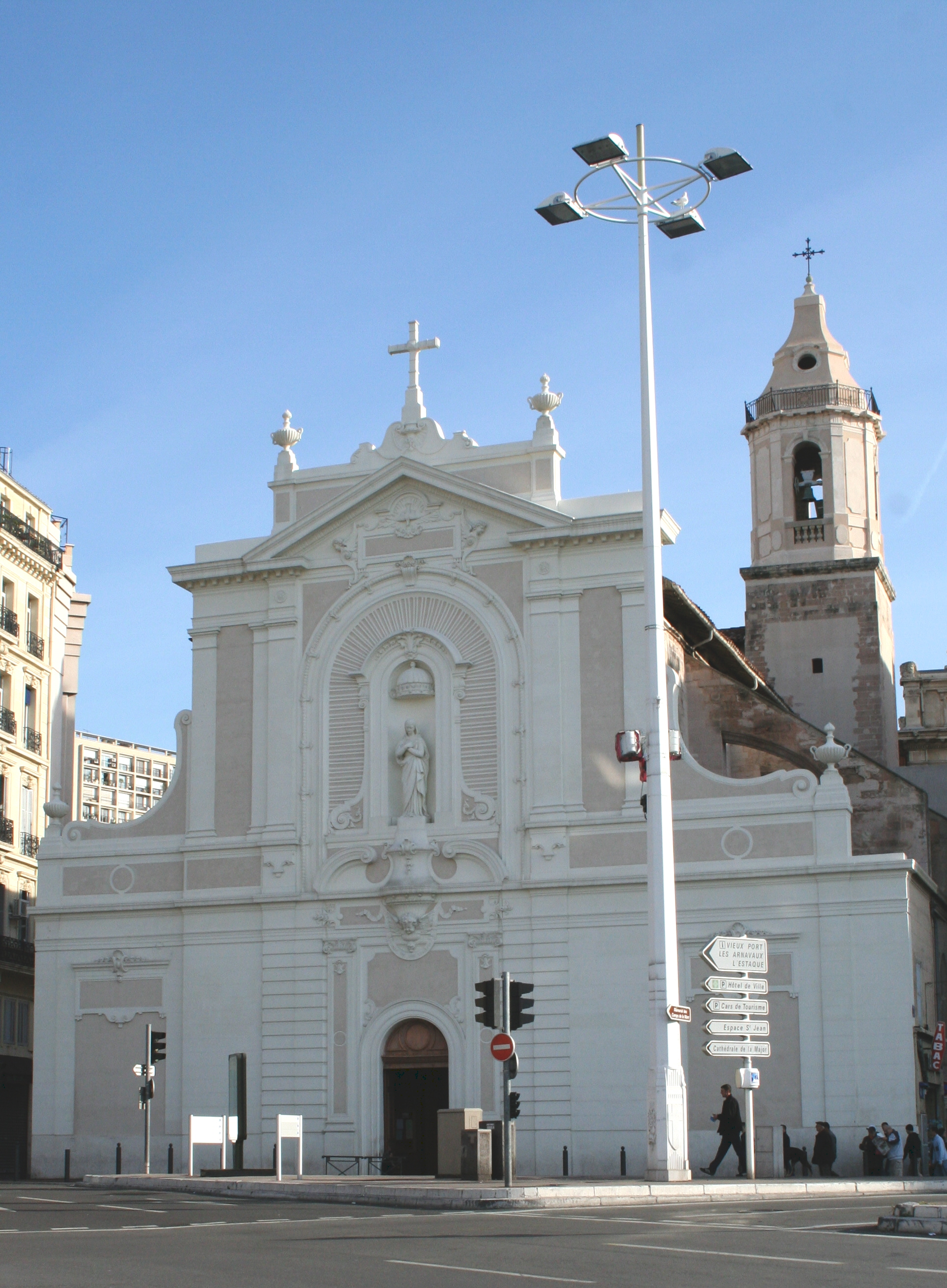
- Façade of the Église Saint-Ferréol les Augustins
- Église Saint-Ferréol les Augustins
- 43.2963°N 5.3744°E
- Location: Quai des Belges; Marseille 13001; Bouches-du-Rhône, Provence-Alpes-Côte d'Azur
- Country: France
- Denomination: Roman Catholic
- Tradition: Augustinian

History
- Founded: 1447
- Dedicated: 1542

Architecture
- Architectural type: church
- Style: Gothic
- Completed: 1588

Administration
- Diocese: Roman Catholic Archdiocese of Marseille

Clergy
- Rector: Hervé Giraud
- Vicar(s): Paul Carpentier; Etienne Labignette

The Église Saint-Ferréol les Augustins is a Roman Catholic church in Marseille.

== Location ==
The church is at Quai des Belges, 13001 Marseille, in the Old Port of Marseille.

== History ==
The original building on site was owned by the Knights Templar. However, in 1369, it was given to a community of Augustinian hermits. By 1447, they decided to spearhead the construction a new church building. It was dedicated in 1542, even though the vault was only completed in 1588.

During the Ancien Régime (15th century to 18th century), it was used for professional ceremonies. For example, ship-porters had their own altars in the church as early as 1390: one dedicated to Saint Peter, and a second one to Saint Paul.

Pope Clement VII (1478–1534) married his niece, Catherine de' Medici (1519–1589), to Henry II of France (1519–1559), in this church on October 28, 1533.

During the French Revolution of 1789, it came close to being destroyed. However, it was salvaged. Shortly after, it was renamed in honour of Saint Augustine. Later, it was sold to a businessman. Later, it was returned to the Catholic Church.

The façade was destroyed in 1801, due to construction work on the street, and it was rebuilt in 1875. In 1803, it was named in honour of Saint Ferréol de Vienne, a Roman Catholic martyr from the 3rd century who was the namesake of another church in Marseille which was destroyed during the French Revolution.

The high altar was designed by Dominique Fossaty, as were the altars of the Augustinians and of the ship-porters. Inside the church can also be found the Mazenod family's tomb dating back to 1564 and the Montolieu family's tomb, dating back to 1695. The relics of Saint Louis of Toulouse (1274–1297) are also in the church.

The church has a few works of art. Three paintings by Michel Serre (1658-1733) are displayed inside the church: Sainte Marguerite, Le repos pendant la fuite en Égypte, and La Vierge à l'enfant apparaissant à Saint Pierre et Saint Paul. There is also a bust of Saint Ferréol de Vienne. Additionally, there is a sculpture of Saint Augustine designed by Raymond Servian (1903-1953). Another sculpture, by Élie-Jean Vézien (1890-1982), represents Saint Theresa. Yet another sculpture, this time by Louis Botinelly (1883-1962), is of Joan of Arc. A more recently sculpture, designed by Yves le Pape in 1979, depicts the Holy Family.

The neogothic pipe organ, designed by Augustin Zieger, dates back to 1844.

== At present ==
The church building is open every weekday from 9AM to 6:30PM. Mass is said every weekday at 12PM and 6PM, every Saturday at 6PM, every Sunday at 9:30AM, 11AM and 7PM.

== Gallery ==
Église Saint-Ferréol les Augustins
Map of the church

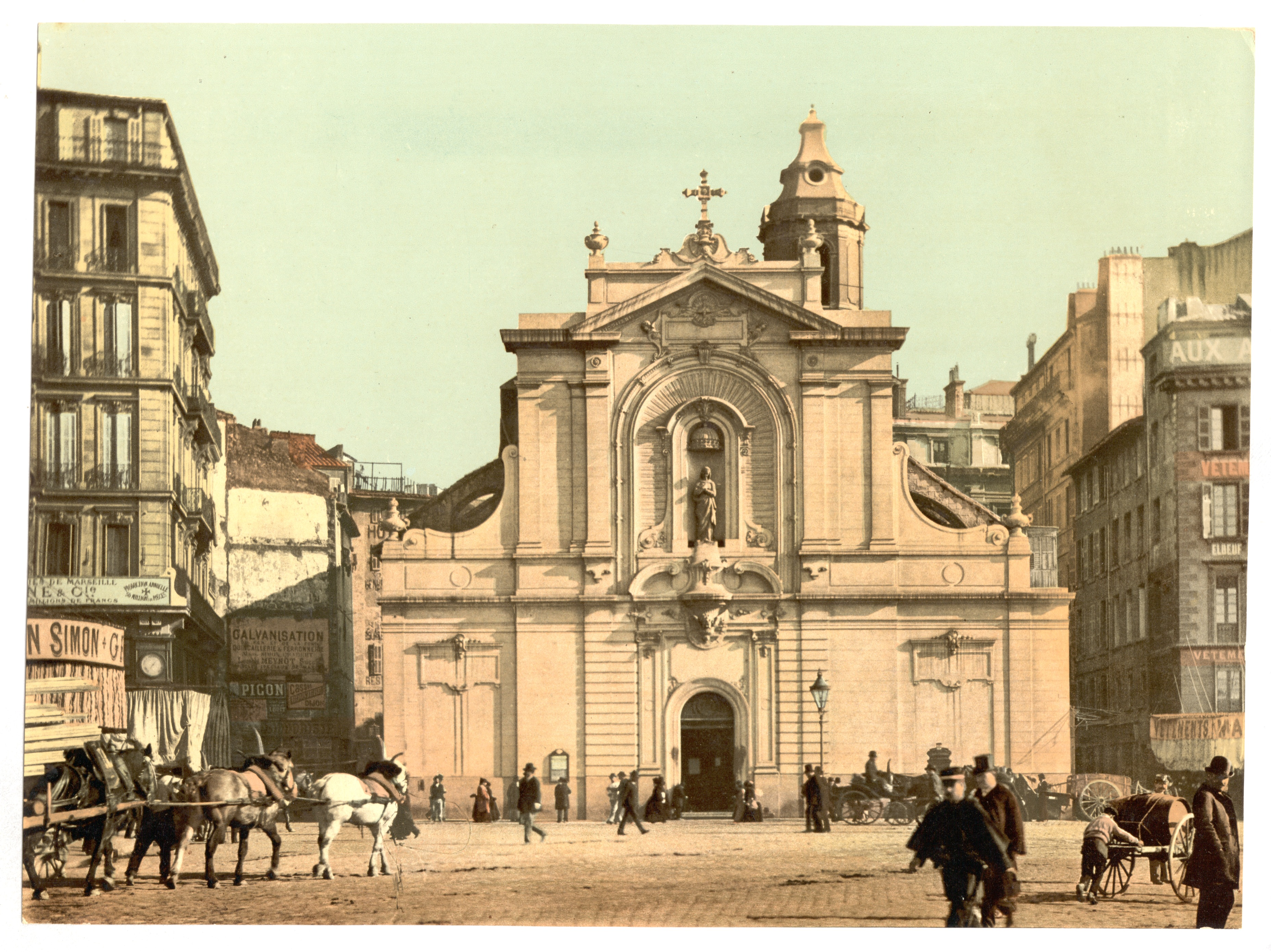
Picture of the Église Saint-Ferréol les Augustins taken in 1905 by the Detroit Photographic Company

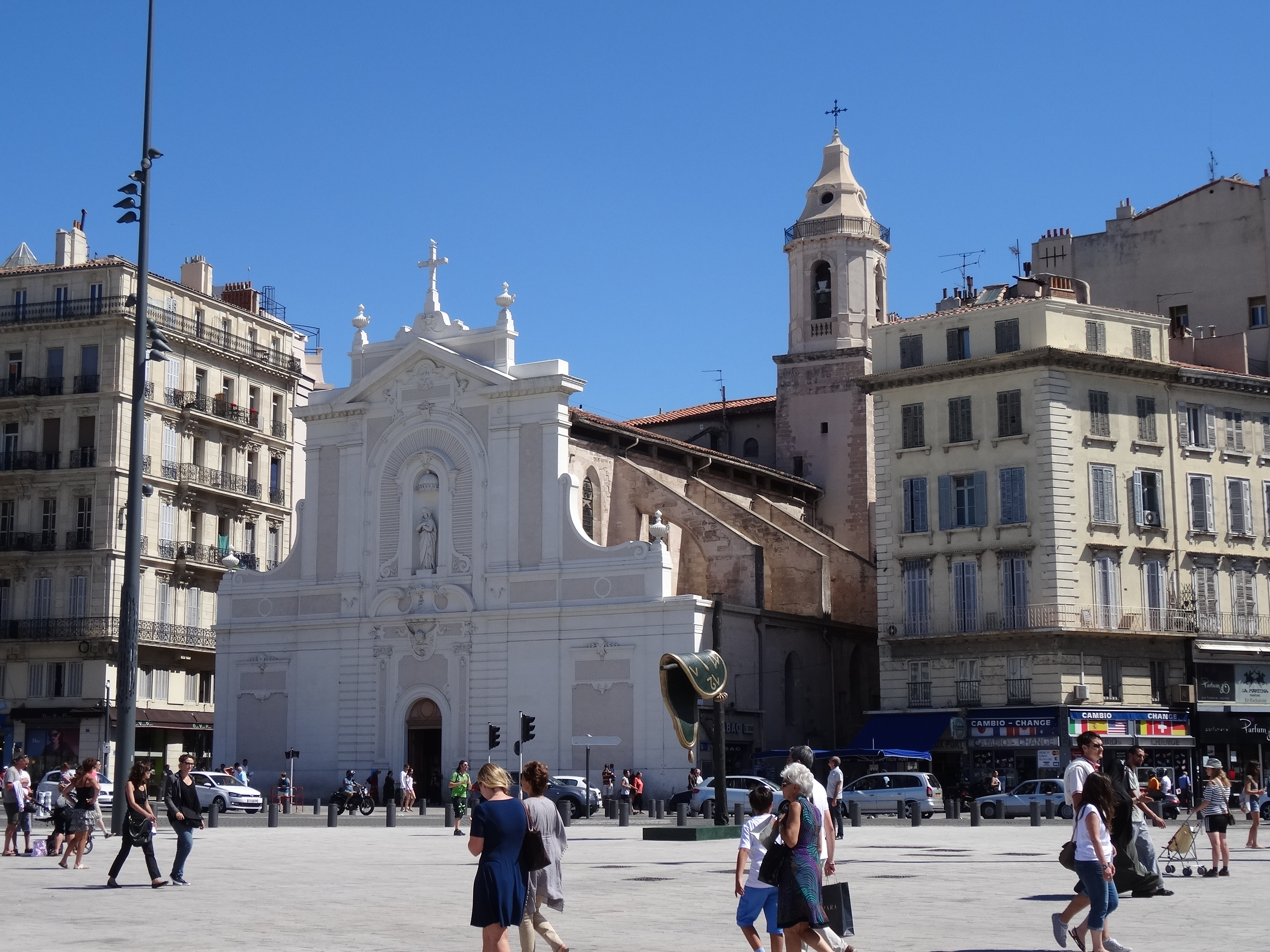
View of the Église Saint-Ferréol les Augustins in daytime

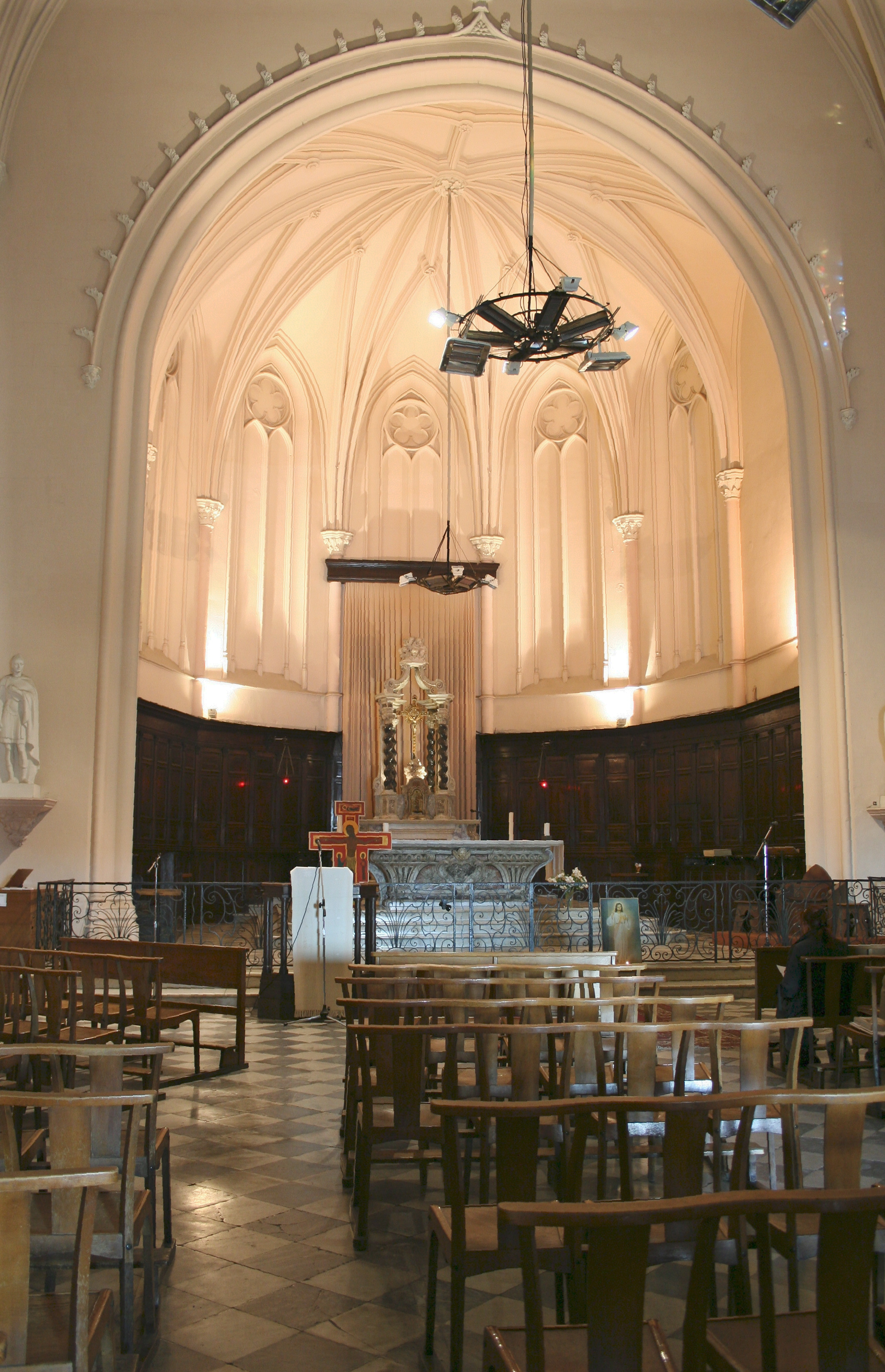
Nave inside the Église Saint-Ferréol les Augustins

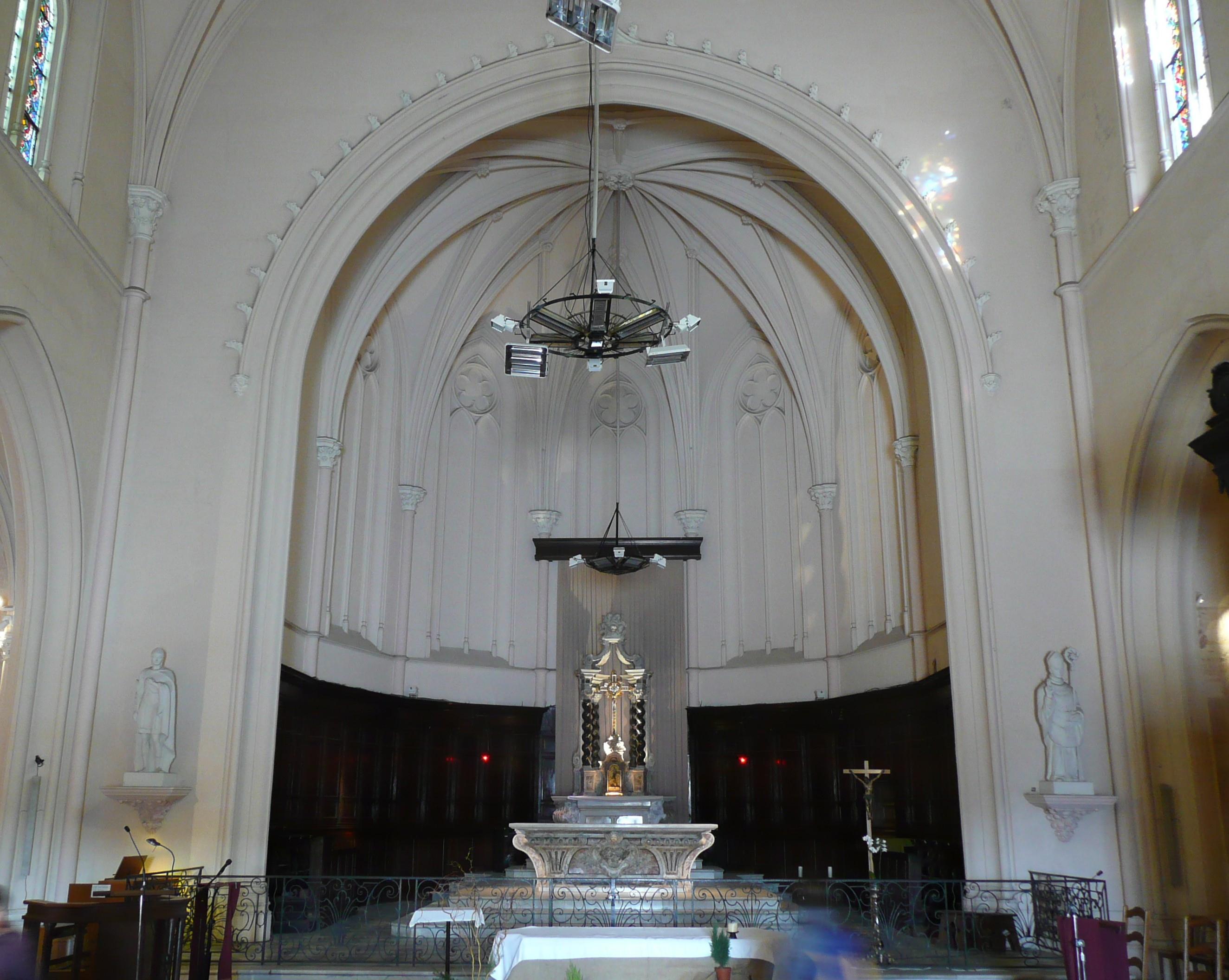
High altar designed by Dominique Fossaty inside the Église Saint-Ferréol les Augustins

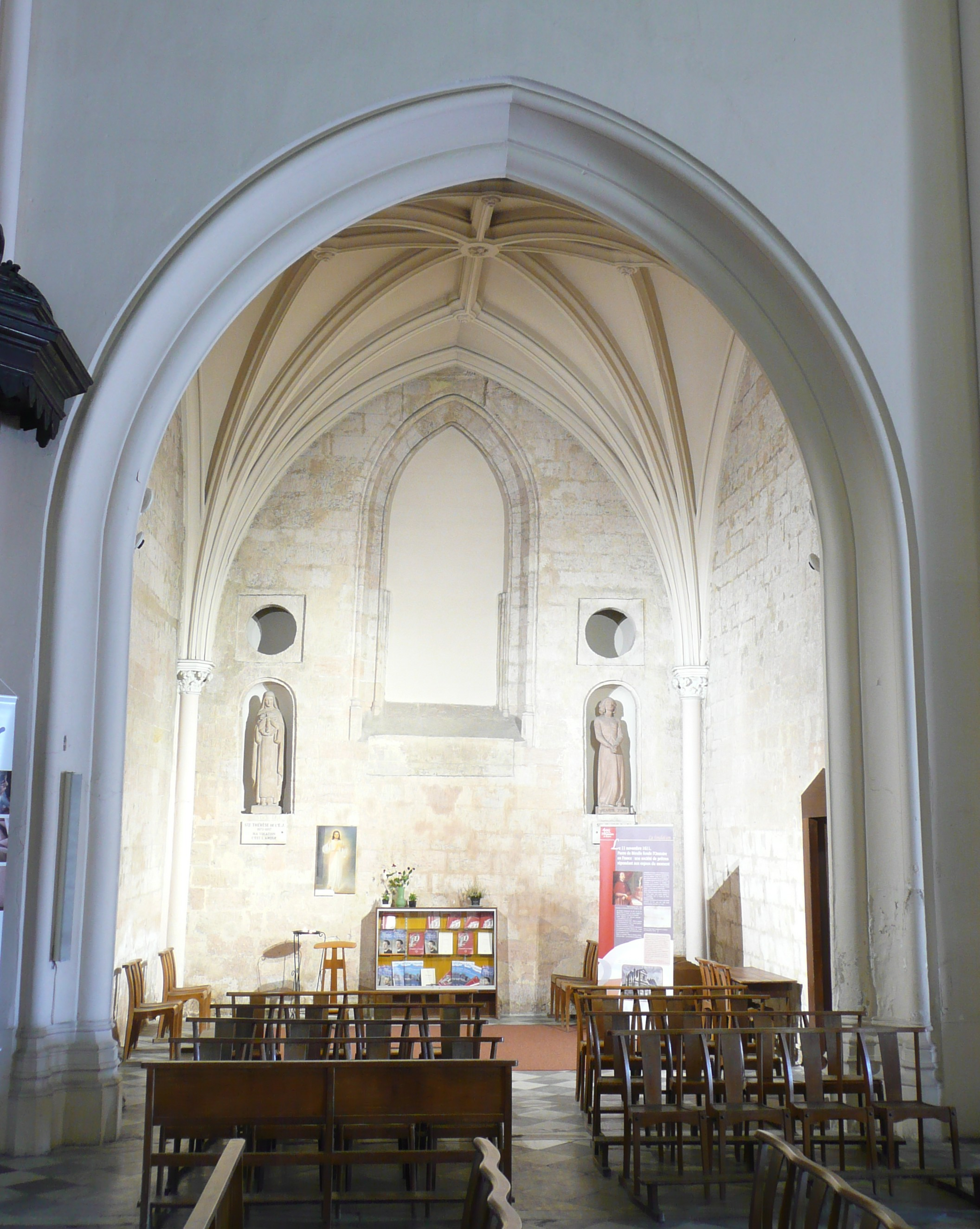
Right side inside the Église Saint-Ferréol les Augustins

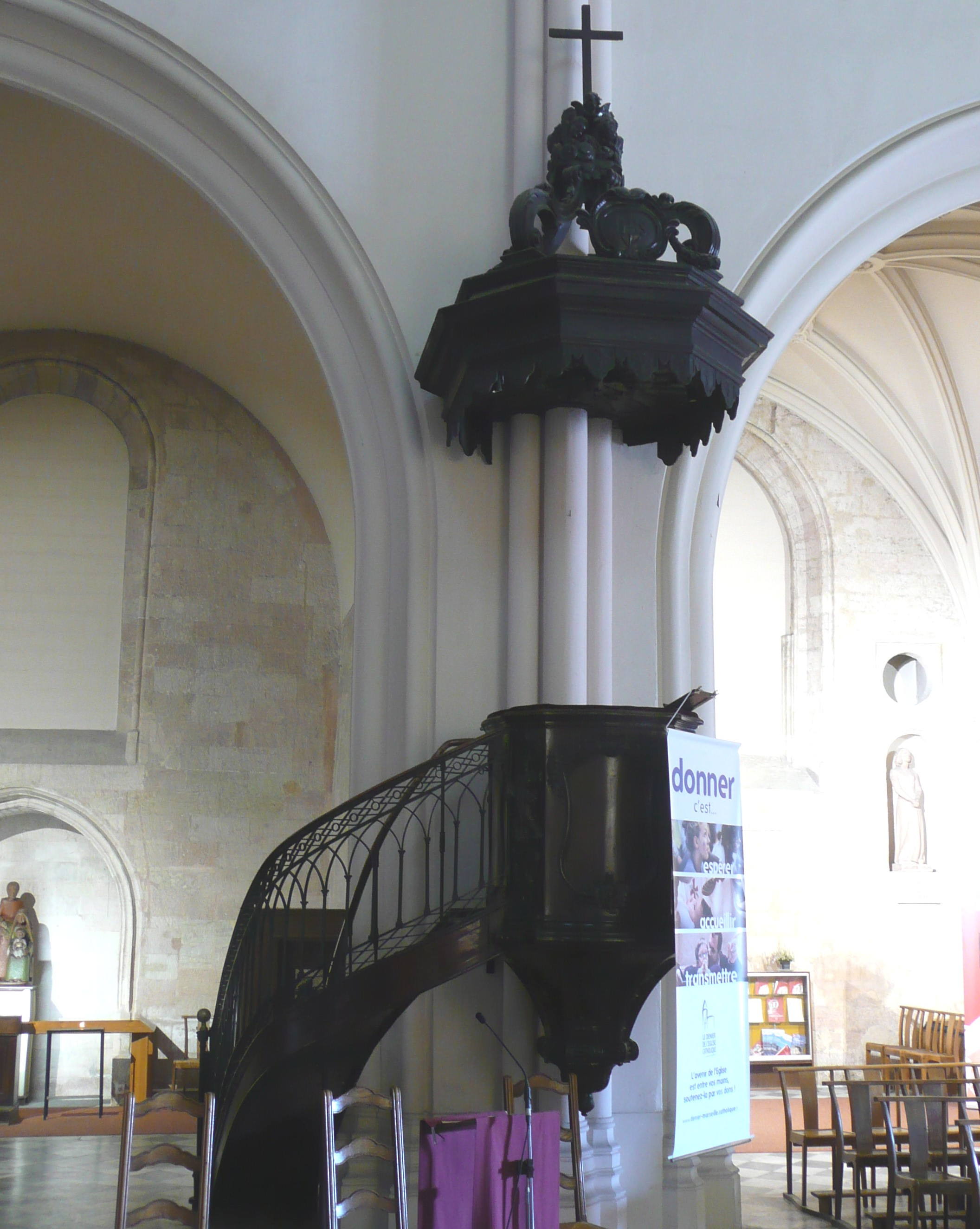
Pulpit inside the Église Saint-Ferréol les Augustins

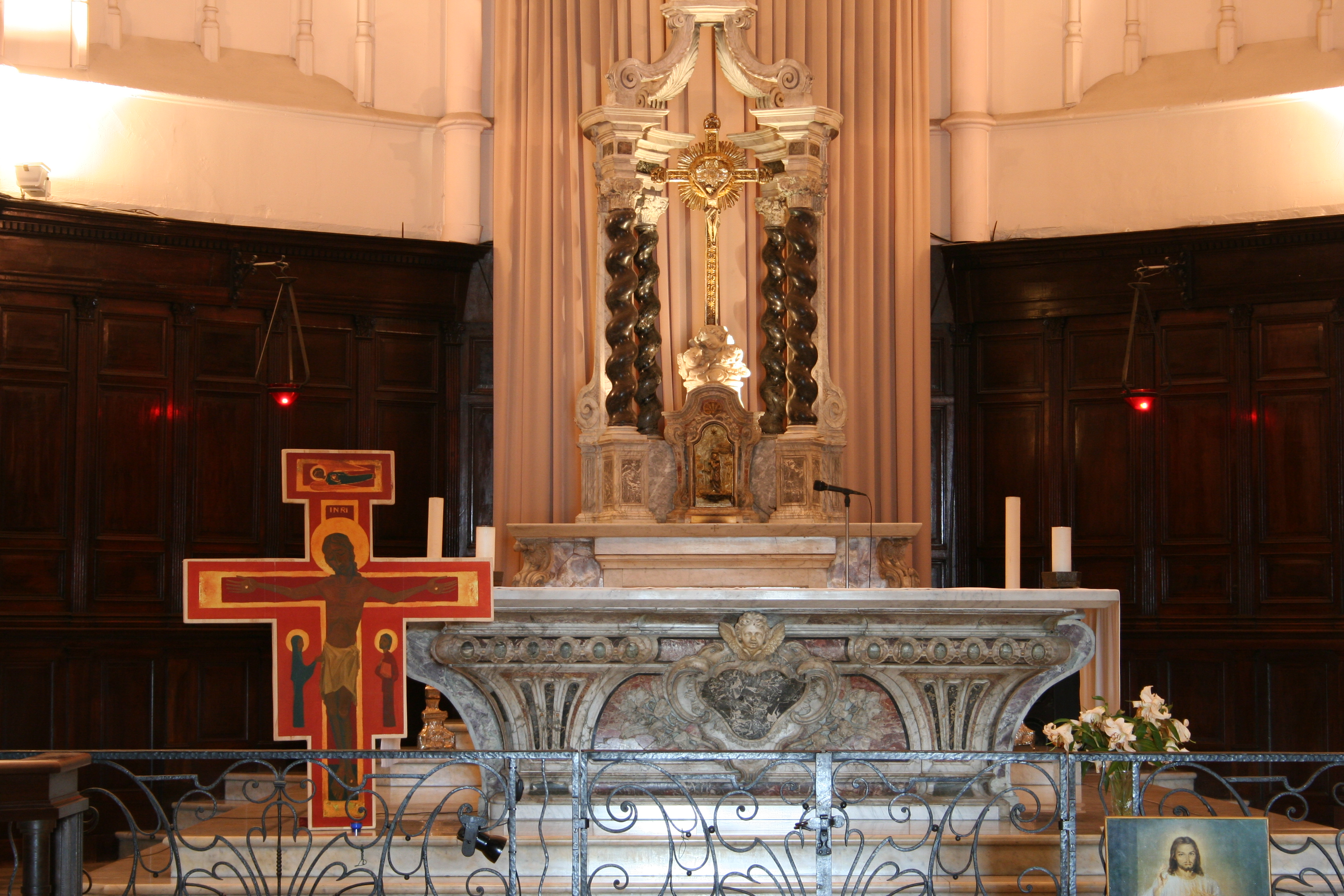
Altar of the Augustinians designed by Dominique Fossaty inside the Église Saint-Ferréol les Augustins

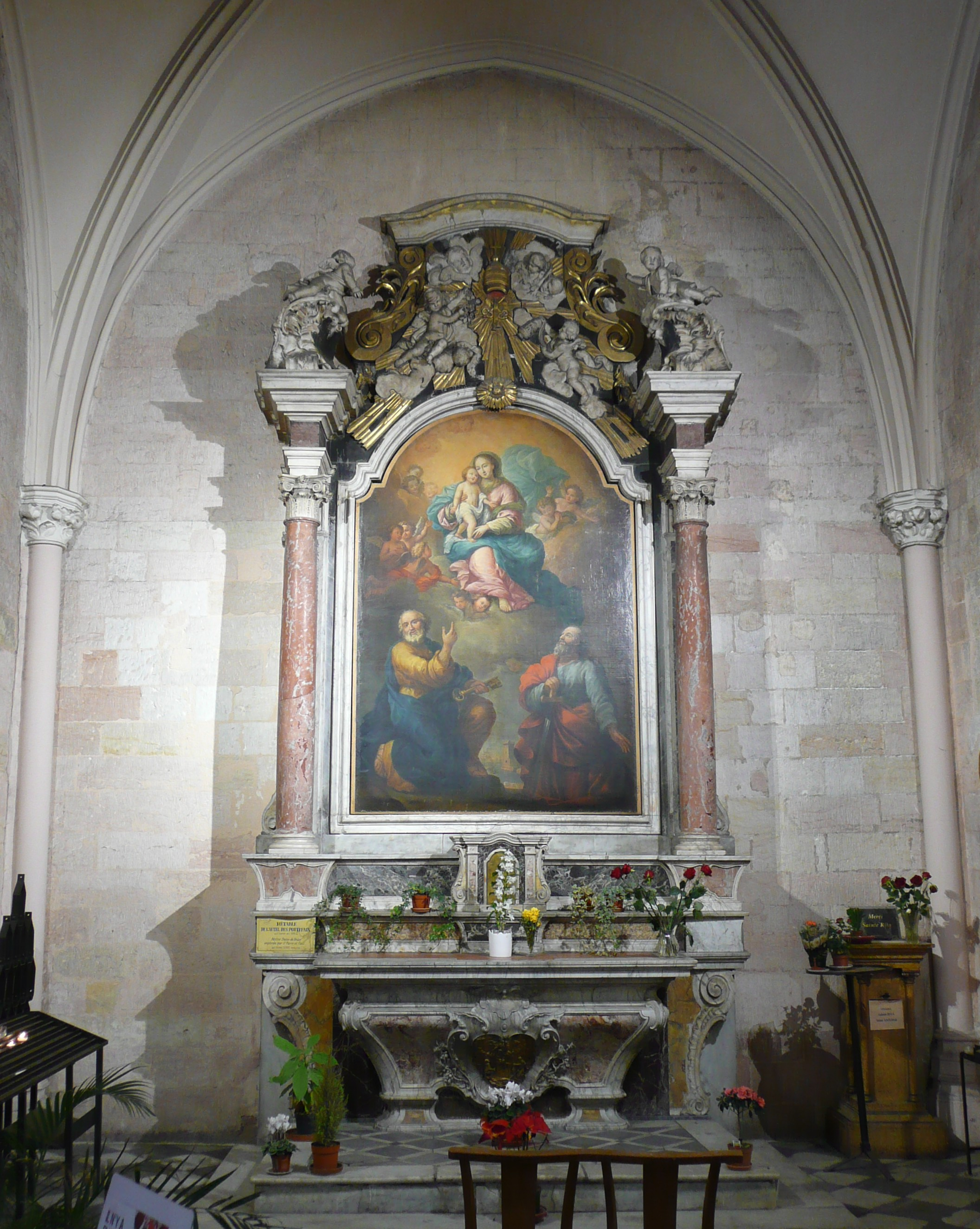
Altar of the ship-porters designed by Dominique Fossaty inside the Église Saint-Ferréol les Augustins

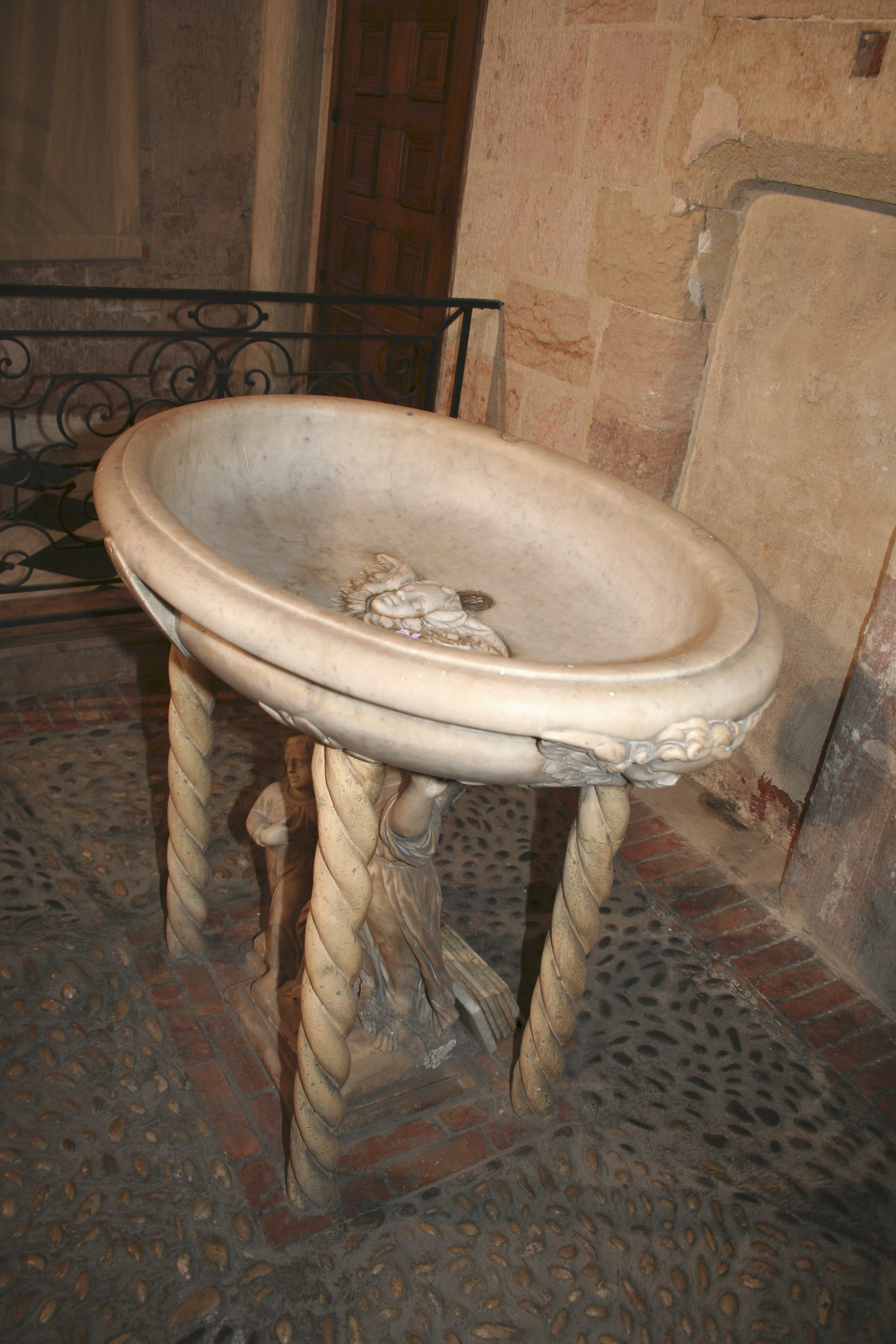
Baptism font inside the Église Saint-Ferréol les Augustins

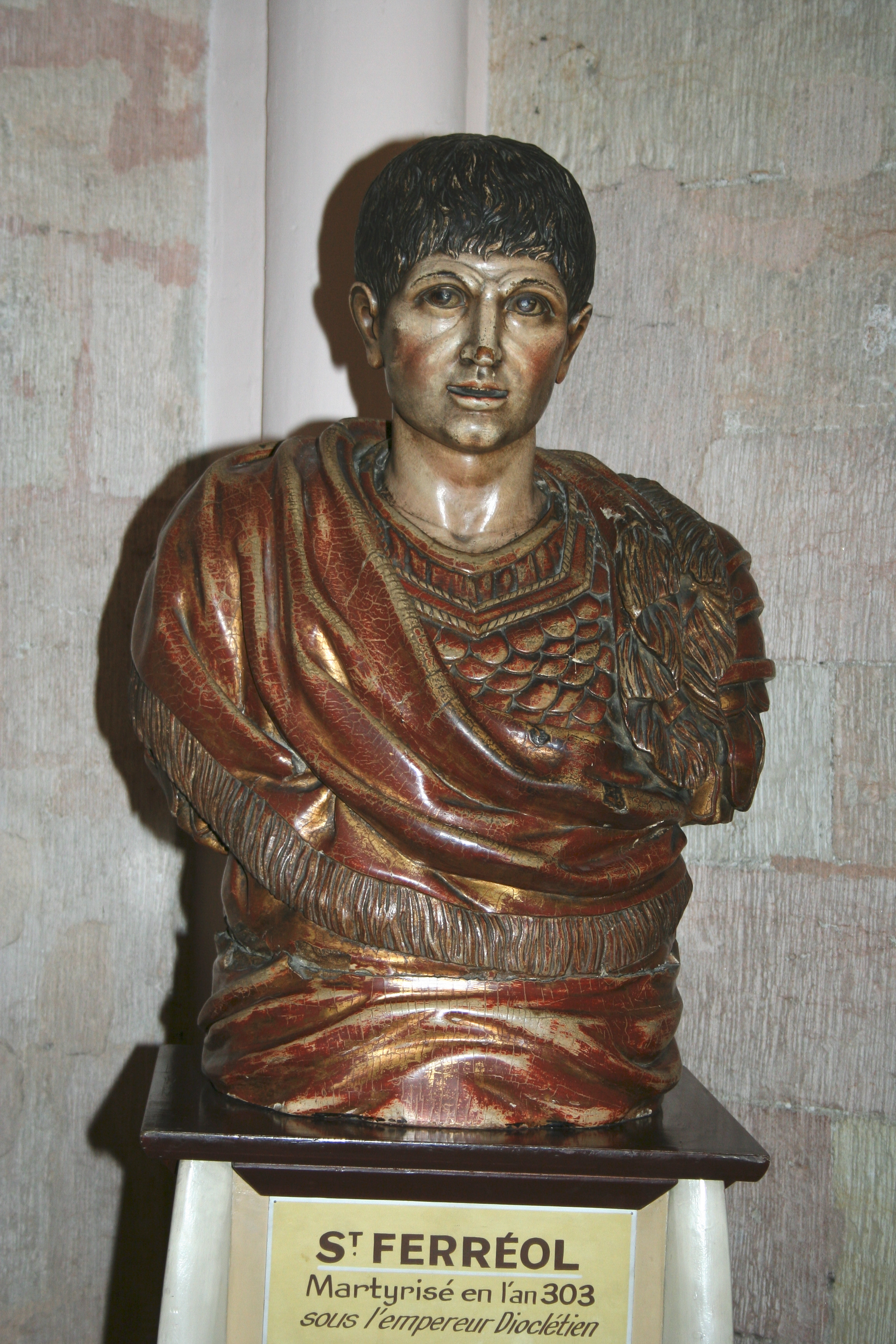
Bust of Ferréol de Vienne inside the Église Saint-Ferréol les Augustins

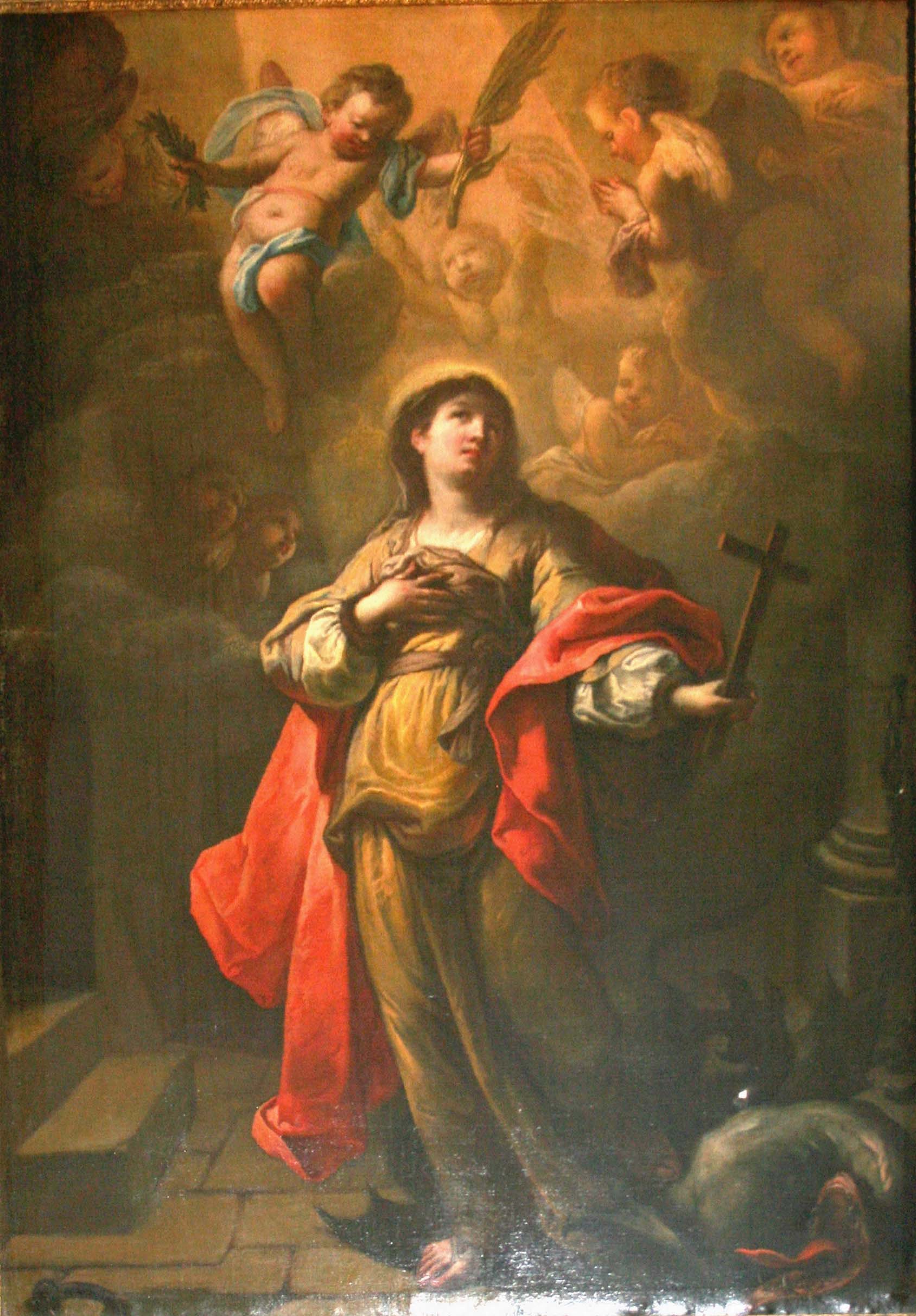
Painting by Michel Serre entitled Sainte Marguerite inside the Église Saint-Ferréol les Augustins

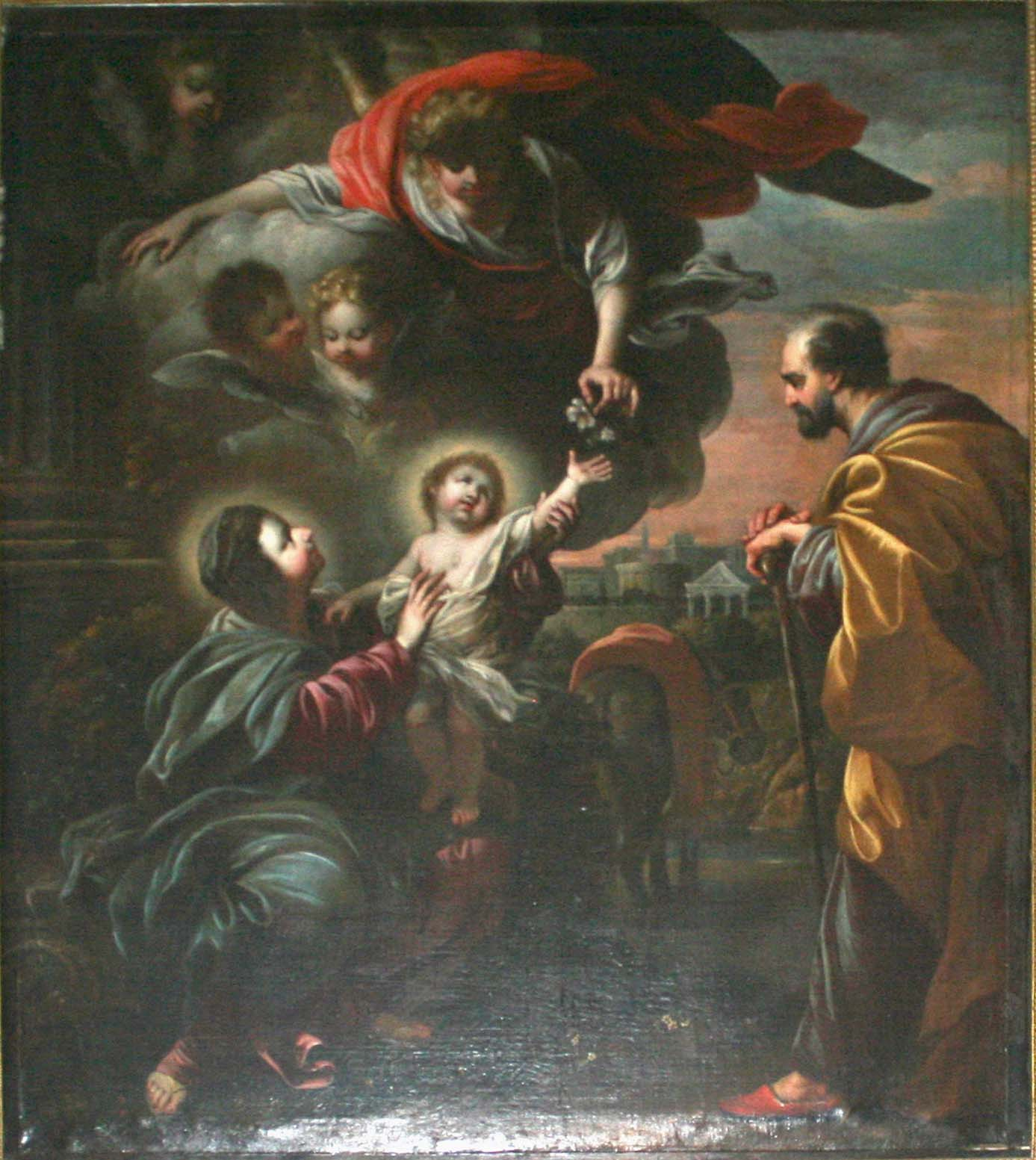
Painting by Michel Serre entitled Le repos pendant la fuite en Égypte inside the Église Saint-Ferréol les Augustins

== See also ==
- List of works by Louis Botinelly
