= Charloun Rieu =

French farmer and poet

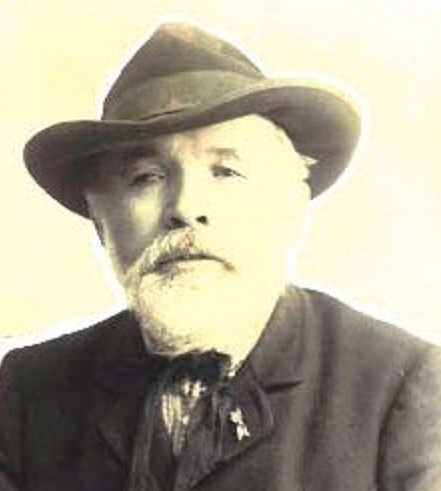
Charloun Rieu in the 1920s

Charles Rieu a.k.a. Charloun Rieu (1 November 1846 – 10 January 1924) was a French farmer and poet. The French sculptor Louis Botinelly created a monument that commemorates his life.

He was buried in Le Paradou.

== See also ==
- List of works by Louis Botinelly
