= Fontvieille, Bouches-du-Rhône =

Commune in Provence-Alpes-Côte d'Azur, France

Fontvieille
- Commune
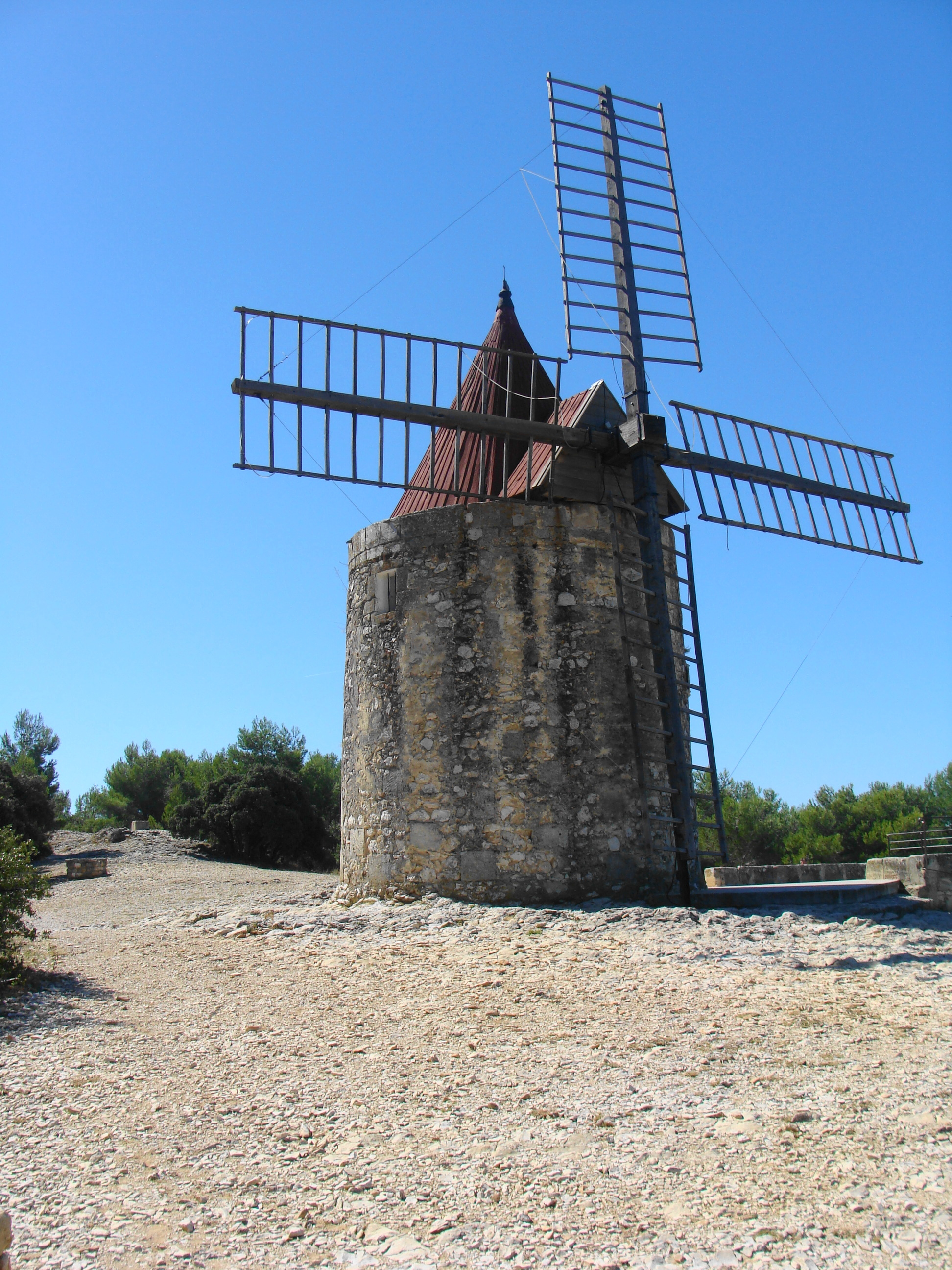
- Alphonse Daudet's windmill

- Coat of arms
- Location of Fontvieille
- Location within France Location within Provence-Alpes-Côte d'Azur
- Coordinates: 43°43′40″N 4°42′35″E
- Country: France
- Region: Provence-Alpes-Côte d'Azur
- Department: Bouches-du-Rhône
- Arrondissement: Arles
- Canton: Salon-de-Provence-1

Government
  - Mayor (2026–32): Gérard Garnier
- Area^{1}: 40.18 km^{2} (15.51 sq mi)
- Elevation: 20 m (66 ft)
- Highest elevation: 245 m (804 ft)
- Lowest elevation: 0 m (0 ft)
- Population (2023): 3,571
  - Density: 88.88/km^{2} (230.2/sq mi)
- Time zone: UTC+01:00 (CET)
  - Summer (DST): UTC+02:00 (CEST)
- INSEE/Postal code: 13038 /13990
- ^{1} French Land Register data, which excludes lakes, ponds, glaciers > 1 km^{2} (0.386 sq mi or 247 acres) and river estuaries.

Fontvieille (French pronunciation: [fɔ̃vjɛj]; Occitan: Fòntvielha) is a commune in the camargue region in the Bouches-du-Rhône department in southern France.

== History ==
The commune was created in 1790, out of the territory of Arles.

The Occitan language poet Brémonde de Tarascon (1858–98) grew up on the Darbousille farm at Fontvieille, where she died.

== Population ==
Historical population

Year	Pop.	±% p.a.
1793	1,613	—
1800	1,900	+2.37%
1806	1,728	−1.57%
1821	2,044	+1.13%
1831	2,056	+0.06%
1836	2,165	+1.04%
1841	2,142	−0.21%
1846	2,402	+2.32%
1851	2,492	+0.74%
1856	2,479	−0.10%
1861	2,788	+2.38%
1866	3,248	+3.10%
1872	2,566	−3.85%
1876	2,565	−0.01%
1881	2,596	+0.24%
1886	2,840	+1.81%
1891	2,591	−1.82%
1896	2,541	−0.39%
1901	2,515	−0.21%

Year	Pop.	±% p.a.
1906	2,252	−2.18%
1911	2,104	−1.35%
1921	2,027	−0.37%
1926	2,057	+0.29%
1931	2,079	+0.21%
1936	2,079	+0.00%
1946	2,064	−0.07%
1954	2,244	+1.05%
1962	2,388	+0.78%
1968	2,440	+0.36%
1975	2,935	+2.67%
1982	3,374	+2.01%
1990	3,642	+0.96%
1999	3,431	−0.66%
2007	3,472	+0.15%
2012	3,653	+1.02%
2017	3,591	−0.34%
2023	3,571	−0.09%

Source: EHESS and INSEE (1968-2023)

== Sights ==
- Alphonse Daudet's windmill
- Barbegal aqueduct and mill, a Roman watermill complex located on the territory of the commune

== Twin towns ==
Fontvieille is twinned with Santa Maria a Monte, Italy, since 1991.

== See also ==
- Alpilles
- Communes of the Bouches-du-Rhône department
