= René Jouveau =

French poet and writer

- Born: 1906
- Died: 1997 (aged 90–91)
- Occupation(s): Poet, non-fiction writer

René Jouveau (French pronunciation: [ʁəne ʒuvo]; 1906–1997) was a French poet and non-fiction writer. He received the Prix Broquette-Gonin from the Académie française for his book entitled Histoire du Félibrige in 1971.

== Works ==
- Jouveau, René (1963). La cuisine Provençale de tradition populaire. Berne: Editions du Message. OCLC 31895227.
- Jouveau, René (1970). Histoire du Félibrige. Nimes: Imprimerie Bene. OCLC 7676616.
- Jouveau, René; Rostaing, Charles (1987). Précis de littérature provençale. Marseille: Lou Provençau a l'escolo. OCLC 21046612.
