= Brouzet =

Brouzet is a French surname. Notable people with the surname include:

- Marguerite Brouzet (1855–1891), mistress of Georges Boulanger
- Olivier Brouzet (born 1972), French rugby union footballer
- Yves Brouzet (1948–2003), French shot putter
