= Louis Botinelly =

French sculptor

- Born: 26 January 1883; Digne-les-Bains, Alpes-de-Haute-Provence, France
- Died: 28 March 1962 (aged 79); Marseille, Bouches-du-Rhône, France
- Occupation: Sculptor

Louis Botinelly (26 January 1883 – 28 March 1962) was a French sculptor.

== Biography ==
=== Personal life ===
Botinelly was born on 2 January 1883 in Digne-les-Bains, Alpes-de-Haute-Provence, France. He died on 26 March 1962 in Marseille.

=== Career ===
Botinelly’s atelier was on the Rue Buffon in Marseille. He designed two public sculptures which can be seen at the bottom of either side of the main staircase of the Gare de Marseille-Saint-Charles: one, called 'Colonies d'Asie,' represents colonial Asia, and the other, called 'Colonies d'Afrique,' represents colonial Africa. They have been displayed there since the dedication of the Gare Saint-Charles in 1927. He designed a bust of Frédéric Mistral (1830-1914), which is displayed in the Parc Jourdan in Aix-en-Provence. Additionally, he designed the statues of Joan of Arc and Jesus inside the Église Saint-Vincent-de-Paul in Marseille. He also designed four statues of the Four Evangelists inside the Marseille Cathedral. Inside the Église Saint-Ferréol les Augustins is also displayed a sculpture of his representing Joan of Arc. He also competed in the art competitions at the 1932 Summer Olympics.

=== Legacy ===
- The Boulevard Louis Botinelly in Marseille is named in his honour.
- The Ecole Elementaire Botinelly, a state primary school located at 23 Boulevard Botinelly in Marseille, is also named in his honor.

== Secondary sources ==
- Luce Carbonnel, Louis Botinelly, 1883 - 1962 (Comité du Vieux-Marseille, 2001).
- Laurent Noet, Louis Botinelly, sculpteur provençal: Catalogue raisonné (Editions Mare et Martin, 2006).

== See also ==
- List of works by Louis Botinelly
