= Frédéric Mistral (lawyer) =

- Born: 1893
- Died: 1968 (aged 74–75)
- Occupations: Lawyer, linguist
- Spouse: Rinette Mistral
- Relatives: Frédéric Mistral (great-uncle)

Frédéric Mistral (1893–1968) was a French lawyer and linguist. He was a practising lawyer in Avignon. He served as the capouliér (president) of the Félibrige from 1941 to 1956. He promoted Provençal language and literature in France and abroad.

== Works ==
- Mistral, Frédéric (1927). Un poète bilingue : Adolphe Dumas (1806-1861), ses relations avec les romantiques et avec les félibres. Paris: Editions des Presses françaises. OCLC 420516484.
- Mistral, Frédéric (1928). Et nous verrons Berre : pages de doctrine et de critique félibréennes. Aix-en-Provence: Éditions du feu. OCLC 3355263.
- Mistral, Frédéric (1930). Gloses sur Maillane et Mistral. Paris: J. Peyronnet & cie. OCLC 10815018.
- Mistral, Frédéric (1935). Les contes du Mas. Aix-en-Provence: Editions du Feu. OCLC 489839174.
