= List of people from Marseille =

This is a list of people from the French city of Marseille.

== Born in Marseille ==
NOTE: People in italics do not have an article in the English language Wikipedia; links are to the relevant article in French Wikipedia.

=== Actors and singers ===
- Béatrice Altariba (18 June 1939) - actress
- Andrex (André Jaubert) (23 January 1907; d. Marseille, 10 July 1989) - singer
- Jacques Angelvin (5 August 1914; d. Cannes, 10 November 1978) - actor, TV host
- Edmond Ardisson (30 November 1904; d. Marseille, 30 November 1983) - actor
- Henri Arius (19 September 1897d. Marseille, 8 May 1962) - actor
- Ariane Ascaride (10 October 1954) - actress
- Junie Astor (21 December 1911; d. Sainte-Magnance, 22 August 1967) - actress
- Marguerite Baux (fl. 1870s–1880s) - opera singer
- Charles Blavette (24 June 1906; d. Suresnes, 21 November 1967) - actor
- Patrick Bosso (12 October 1962) - actor
- Bréols (12 August 1905; d. Allauch, 20 December 1988) - actor, singer
- Pierrette Bruno (22 August 1928) - actress
- Lucien Callamand (1 April 1888; d. Nice, 3 December 1968) - actor
- Jean Castan (23 August 1917; d. La Penne-sur-Huveaune, 11 November 1990) - actor
- Philippe Caubère (21 September 1950) - actor
- Fernand Charpin (30 May 1887; d. Marseille, 7 November 1944) - actor
- Marcel Charvey (22 February 1916; d. Puteaux, 21 August 1995) - actor
- Andrée Clément (7 August 1918; d. Paris, 31 May 1954) - actress
- Jo Corbeau (Georges Ohanessian) (1 December 1946) - reggae singer
- Henri Crémieux (19 July 1896; d. Cassis, 10 May 1980) - actor
- Dazincourt (Joseph Albouis) (11 December 1747; d. Paris, 28 March 1809) - actor
- Édouard Delmont (5 December 1883; d. Cannes, 22 November 1955) - actor
- Doumel (Louis Alfred Doumet) (2 December 1889; d. Reillanne, 23 May 1954) - actor
- Louis Ducreux (22 September 1911; d. Neuilly, 19 December 1992) - actor, director
- Dugazon (Jean-Henry Gourgaud) (15 November 1746; d. Sandillon, 11 October 1809) - actor
- Fernandel (Fernand Contandin) (7 May 1903; d. Paris, 26 February 1971) - actor, singer
- Franck Fernandel (Franck Contandin) (10 December 1935, d. Marseille, 8 June 2011) - actor, singer, radio host
- Ginette Garcin (1928–2010) - actor
- Louis Jourdan (19 June 1921 – 2015) - actor
- Jean Le Poulain (12 September 1924; d. Paris, 1 March 1988) - actor, director
- Cora Madou (5 January 1891; d. Villefranche sur Mer, 26 February 1971) - singer
- Lucie Manvel (1 May 1863; d. Paris 17e, 3 November 1943) - comedy theatre actress
- Avy Marciano (1 November 1972) - actor, musician, composer, author, interpreter
- Milly Mathis (8 September 1901; d. Salon de Provence, 30 March 1965) actress
- Marcel Maupi (6 November 1881; d. Antibes, 10 January 1949) - actor
- Clara Morgane (25 January 1981) - singer, former pornographic actress, media personality and TV host
- Paul Ollivier (10 February 1876; d. Paris, 10 June 1948) - actor
- Géraldine Pailhas (8 January 1971) - actress
- Paul Préboist (21 February 1927; d. Paris, 13 March 1997) - actor
- Joseph Pujol (1 June 1865; d. Toulon, 8 August 1945) - strolling comedian, professional farter
- Jean-Pierre Rambal (13 September 1931; d. Paris, 18 July 2001) - actor
- Marcelle Ranson-Hervé (10 October 1929) - actress
- Rellys (Henri Bourelly) (15 December 1905; d. Marseille, 20 July 1991) - actor
- Ishay Ribo (born 3 February 1989), Israeli singer-songwriter
- Jean Roucas (1 February 1952) - humourist
- Catherine Rouvel (31 August 1939) - actress
- Daniel Russo (13 May 1948) - actor, double
- Gabriel Signoret (15 November 1878; d. Paris, 16 March 1937) - actor
- Simone Simon (23 April 1911; d. Paris, 23 February 2005) - actress

=== Architects ===
- Pascal Coste (26 November 1787; d. Marseille, 8 February 1879) - architect
- Paul Dupré-Lafon (17 June 1900; d. Deauville, December 1971) - architect and decorator
- Marcel Dourgnon (1858; d. Marseille, 1911) - architect
- Pierre Puget (16 October 1620; d. Marseille, 2 December 1694) - painter, sculptor, architect
- Albert-Félix-Théophile Thomas (1847; d. Paris, 1907) - architect

=== Dancers ===
- Marie Allard (14 August 1742; d. Paris, 14 June 1802) - dancer
- Georges Appaix (1953) - dancer, choreographer
- Gaby Deslys (4 November 1881; d. Paris, 11 February 1920) - dancer, singer
- Maurice Béjart (1 January 1927; d. Lausanne, 22 November 2007) - dancer, choreographer
- Mathieu Ganio (1984) - dancer
- Daniel Larrieu (1927) - dancer
- Lucien Petipa (22 December 1815; d. Versailles, 7 July 1898) - dancer
- Marius Petipa (11 March 1818; d. Hourzouf (Crimea), 14 July 1910) - dancer, ballet master

=== Designers and poster artists ===
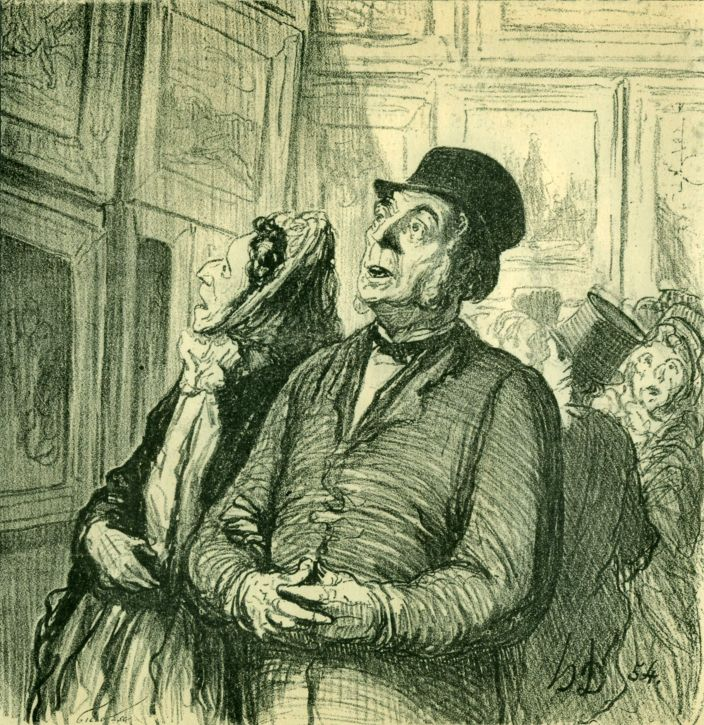
Honoré Daumier: Sunday at the Museum

- Georges Arditi (1914; d. 15 January 2012) - painter
- Jo Berto (Joseph Bertocchio) (22 November 1907; d. Marseille, 25 June 1978) - lithographic artist
- Honoré Daumier (26 February 1808; d. Valmondois, 11 February 1879) - caricaturist, sculptor
- Dubout (15 May 1905; d. Saint-Aunès, 27 June 1976) - humorous designer
- Gérard Lauzier (30 November 1932; d. 6 December 2008) - comic strip artist, film director
- Lisa Mandel (23 April 1977) - comic strip designer
- Tibet (31 October 1931; d. Roquebrune-sur-Argens, 3 January 2010) - comic strip designer
- Jean-Emmanuel Vermot-Desroches (1974) - comic strips

=== Directors ===
- René Allio (8 March 1924; d. Paris, 27 March 1995) - painter, then scenario writer, film and theatre director
- André Benedetto (14 July 1934; d. Avignon, 13 July 2009) - author and theatre director, founder of « off » at Festival d'Avignon
- Paul Carpita (12 November 1922; d. Marseille, 23 October 2009) - scenario writer
- Philippe Dajoux (23 March 1968) - director
- Robert Guédiguian (3 December 1953) - director, actor, screenwriter and producer

=== Doctors ===
- Charles Peyssonnel (1640; d. Marseille, 16 September 1720) - doctor, died from plague
- Jean-André Peyssonnel (19 June 1694; d. Guadeloupe, 24 December 1759) - doctor and naturalist

=== Editors ===
- Robert Laffont (30 November 1916; d. Neuilly-sur-Seine, 19 May 2010) - editor
- Ferdinand Lop (10 October 1891; d. Saint-Sébastien-de-Morsent, 29 October 1974) - editor, poet

=== Engravers ===
- Jacques Gautier d'Agoty (1710; d. Paris, 1781) - engraver
- Henri Berengier (1880; d. 1943) - engraver

=== Explorers ===
- Euthymenes (5th century BC)
- Pierre Blancard (1741–1826), introduced the chrysanthemum to France
- Alphonse Fondère (26 August 1865; d. Addis-Abeba, 26 November 1930) - explorer, aviator
- Pytheas (4th century BC) - astronomer, explorer
- Gaston Rébuffat (7 May 1921; d. Paris, 31 May 1985) - Alpinist
- Jean-Noël Savelli (26 March 1853; d. Foumban, 14 November 1917) - soldier and explorer

=== Historians ===
- Édouard Baratier (19 August 1923; d. Marseille, 31 July 1972) - historian
- Louis Blancard (1831–1902) - archivist, paleographer
- Augustin Fabre (20 June 1797; d. Marseille, 16 January 1870) - historian
- Marc Fumaroli (10 June 1932 – 24 June 2020) - historian, essayist
- Jean-Baptiste Grosson (20 August 1733; d. Montefusco, 20 December 1800) - notary, historian of Marseille
- Camille Jullian (15 March 1859; d. Paris, 12 December 1933) - historian of Gaul

=== Industrialists and business people ===
- Pierre Bellon (24 January 1930) - founder of Sodexo group
- Jules Charles-Roux (14 November 1841; d.|Paris, 6 March 1918) - industrialist, writer, patron
- Norbert D'Agostino - former president of Olympique de Marseille
- Jacques-Antoine Granjon (9 August 1962) - founder of online commerce site Vente-privee.com
- Jean Peyrelevade (24 October 1939) - businessman, politician
- Dominique Piazza (31 May 1860; d. Marseille, |10 December 1941) - inventor of the photographic postcard
- Denis Ranque (7 January 1952) - former CEO and chairman of Thales Group
- Paul Ricard (9 July 1909; d.|Marseille, 7 November 1997) - founder of the Pernod-Ricard alcohol group
- Marc Simoncini (1963) - founder of Internet dating site Meetic
- Serge Tchuruk (13 November 1937) - former CEO and chairman of Alcatel

=== Journalists ===
- Jean-Pierre Foucault (23 November 1947) - radio and TV host
- Patrice Laffont (21 August 1940) - TV host
- André Remacle (3 April 1910; d. Marseille, 14 July 1995) - journalist, writer
- Jean-François Revel (19 January 1924; d. Paris, 30 April 2006) - philosopher, académicien, journalist, political chronicler and writer

=== Lawyers and judges ===
- Gilbert Collard (3 February 1948) - lawyer
- Paul Lombard (17 February 1917) - lawyer and writer
- Eugène Mouton (13 April 1823; d. Paris, 8 June 1902) - magistrate and writer
- Emile Pollak (21 April 1914; d. Marseille, 6 January 1978) - lawyer

=== Mafia ===
- Francis le Belge (3 March 1946; d. Paris, 22 July 2000)
- François Spirito (1900; d. |Toulon, 9 October 1967)
- Nick Venturi (24 June 1923; d. Marseille, 6 April 2008)
- Tany Zampa (1 April 1933; d. Marseille, 16 August 1984)

=== Military people ===
- François Joseph Marie Clary (3 October 1786; d. Paris, 27 January 1841) - brigadier
- François Coli (5 June 1881; d. North Atlantic, 8 May 1927) - aviator
- Guillaume Cornut (c. 1230; d. off Malta, 8 June or 8 July 1283) - admiral
- Pierre Dominique Garnier (19 December 1756; d. Nantes, 11 May 1827) - general in the French Revolution
- Jean Gaspard de Vence (6 April 1747; d. |Tonnerre, March 1808) - corsair, rear-admiral, maritime prefect of Toulon
- Joseph Maugard (24 December 1913; d. Montségur-sur-Lauzon, 11 September 1995) - Compagnon de la Libération
- Émile Muselier (10 April 1882; d. Toulon, 2 September 1965) - admiral
- Nicolas Roze (Le Chevalier Roze) (25 September 1675; d. Marseille, 2 September 1733) - captain during the 1720 plague
- Jean-Paul de Saumeur (Le Chevalier Paul) (December 1598; d. Toulon, 20 December 1667) - squadron commander

=== Musicians ===
- Akhenaton (Philippe Fragione) (17 September 1968) - rapper
- Shurik'n (Geoffroy Mussard) (11 March 1966) - rapper
- Georges Arvanitas (13 June 1931; d. 25 July 2005) - pianist
- Roberto Benzi (12 December 1937) - orchestra conductor
- Erick Benzi (1 March 1959) - author, composer, director
- Ralph Bernet (1927) - lyric writer
- Georges Boeuf (1937) - composer
- Charles Burles (21 June 1936) - tenor
- Léo Chauliac (6 February 1913; d. 27 October 1977) - pianist, composer, orchestra conductor
- Stanislas Champein (19 November 1753; d. Paris, 19 September 1830) - composer
- Georges Chelon (4 January 1943) - author, composer, interpreter
- Régine Crespin (23 February 1927; d. Paris, 5 July 2007) - opera singer
- Domenico Della-Maria (14 June 1769; d. Paris, 9 March 1800) - opera composer
- Patrick Fiori (23 September 1969) - singer
- Mireille Flour (29 April 1906 – 1984) - classical harpist
- Zino Francescatti (9 August 1902; d. La Ciotat, 17 September 1991) - violinist
- Cedric Gervais (1979) - DJ and producer of house music
- Hubert Giraud (1920; d. 2016) - lyric writer
- André Jaume (7 October 1940) - saxophonist, clarinettist
- Landmvrks (2014–present) - metalcore band
- Maxence Larrieu (27 October 1934) - classical flautist
- Le Rat Luciano (Christophe Carmona) (21 April 1976) - rapper
- Jean Lumière (20 August 1895; d. Paris, 2 April 1979) - singer
- Paul Mauriat (|4 March 1925; d. Perpignan, 3 November 2006) - orchestra conductor
- Guy Morançon (1929 – 2025) – organist and composer
- Clara Morgane (1 January 1981) - porn actress
- Lucien Muratore (29 August 1876; d. Paris, 16 July 1954) - tenor, film actor
- André Pascal (1932; d. 2001) - songwriter
- Mireille Ponsard (1908; d. Paris, 5 February 1999) - singer, actress
- Franck Pourcel (14 August 1913; d. Neuilly sur Seine, 12 November 2000) - violinist, orchestra conductor
- Jean-Pierre Rampal (7 January 1922; d. Paris, 20 May 2000) - flautist
- Jean Marie Rebischung (30 March 1962) - composer
- Ernest Reyer (1 December 1823; d. Lavandou, 15 January 1909) - composer
- Jean-Michel Sanchez (28 June 1969) - organist, musicologist
- Vincent Scotto (21 April 1876; d. Paris, 15 November 1952) - composer
- SCH (real name Julien Schwarzer) (6 April 1993) - rapper
- Cyril Tarquiny (24 May 1974) - guitarist
- Henri Tomasi (17 August 1901; d. Paris, 13 January 1971) - orchestra conductor
- Jannick Top (4 October 1947) - composer
- Cora Vaucaire (22 July 1918; d. Paris, 17 September 2011) - singer
- Raymond Vincy (23 February 1904; d. Neuilly-sur-seine, 26 May 1968) - lyric writer
- Jul (real name Julien Mari, 14 January 1990) - rapper

=== Painters ===
- Marguerite Allar (1 August 1899; d. Marseille, 22 January 1974) - painter and teacher
- Raymond Allègre (1857; d. Marseille, 1933) - painter
- Jean Arène (11 September 1929) - painter
- Marcel Arnaud (8 October 1877; d. Aix-en-Provence, 18 March 1956) - painter, director of the école des beaux-arts d'Aix-en-Provence
- Edmond Astruc (4 November 1878; d. Marseille (11 January 1977) - aviator and painter
- Louis Audibert (11 June 1880; d. Marseille, 20 March 1983) - painter
- Joseph-Marius Avy (21 September 1871; d. 1939) - painter
- Eugène de Barberiis (9 March 1851; d. Sanary, 29 November 1937) - painter
- Jean-Jérôme Baugean (18 June 1764; d. 1830) - painter and engraver
- Charles Camoin (23 September 1879; d. Paris, 29 May 1965) - painter
- Jacques Carelman (1929) - painter, decorator and illustrator
- Alfred Casile (9 February 1848; d. Marseille, 1 June 1909) - painter
- Alfred Chataud (17 August 1833; d. Alger, 1908) - Orientalist painter
- Jean-Antoine Constantin (20 January 1756; d. Aix-en-Provence, 9 January 1844) - painter
- Meiffren Conte (1624; d. Marseille, 10 March 1705) - painter
- Édouard Crémieux (21 January 1856; d. in deportation, May 1944) - painter
- Jean-Joseph Dassy (27 December 1791; d. Marseille, 27 July 1865) - painter
- Sauveur Marius Di Russo (11 January 1897; d. Marseille, 18 November 1983) - painter
- Eugène Dufour (1873; d. Marseille, 1941) - painter
- Antoine Ferrari (1 February 1910; d. Marseille, 1995) - painter
- Joseph Garibaldi (1863; d. Marseille, 7 May 1941) - painter
- François Gautier (1842; d. 1917) - painter
- Antoine Gianelli (23 August 1896; d. Marseille, 23 March 1983) - painter
- Jean-Amédée Gibert (28 January 1869; d. Marseille, 1945) - painter (Prix de Rome 1898), architect, curator of the Musées de Marseille
- Marius Guindon (8 April 1805; d. 1918) - painter, sculptor
- Piotr Klemensiewicz (11 February 1956) - painter
- Charles François Lacroix de Marseille (1700; d. Berlin, 1782) - painter
- Alfred Lombard (24 April 1884; d. Toulon, 7 September 1973) - painter
- Antoine Dominique Magaud (4 August 1817; d. Marseille, 23 December 1899) - painter
- Étienne Philippe Martin (27 July 1856; d. Marseille, 6 March 1945) - painter, musician
- Jules Monge (1855; d. Paris, 1934) - painter
- Adolphe Monticelli (18 October 1824; d. Marseille, 26 June 1886) - painter
- Alphonse Moutte (4 March 1840; d. Marseille, 21 April 1913) - painter
- Louis Nattero (16 October 1870; d. Marseille, 10 November 1915) - painter
- Jean-Baptiste Olive (31 July 1848; d. Paris, 13 May 1936) - painter
- Henri Pinta (1856; d. Paris, 1944) - painter, Prix de Rome 1884
- Jean-Claude Quilici (1941) - painter
- Marie Rauzy (21 March 1961) - painter
- Marius Rey (1836; d. 1927) - painter
- Gustave Ricard (1 September 1823; d. Paris, 23 January 1873) - painter
- Antoine Roux (6 March 1765; d. Marseille, 20 April 1835) - painter
- Arsène Sari (7 October 1895; d. Aubagne, 8 November 1995) - painter
- René Seyssaud (15 June 1867; d. Saint-Chamas, 24 Septembre) - painter
- Louis Toncini (1907; d. 2002) - painter
- François Topino-Lebrun (11 April 1764; d. Paris, 31 January 1801) - painter and revolutionary
- Stanislas Torrents (23 May 1839; d. Cannes, 6 November 1916) - painter
- Louis Trabuc (2 August 1928; d. Manosque, 23 February 2008) - painter
- André Alexandre Verdilhan (14 March 1881; d. Paris, 21 July 1963) - painter, sculptor
- Fortuné Viguier (1841; d. 1916) - painter
- Auguste Vimar (3 November 1851; d. Marseille, 23 August 1916) - painter, sculptor

=== Police officers ===
- Lucien Aimé-Blanc (23 March 1935 – 19 February 2020) - Commissioner
- Gérard Girel (7 August 1946) - Commissioner
- Georges Nguyen Van Loc (2 April 1933; d. Cannes, 7 December 2008) - Commissioner, writer and actor

=== Politicians ===
- René Arthaud (21 September 1915; d. 21 July 2007) - Deputy
- Charles Barbaroux (6 March 1767; d. Bordeaux, 25 June 1794) - lawyer, Deputy
- Henry Bergasse (26 September 1894; d. Marseille, 28 March 1977) - Deputy
- Paul Boulet (8 September 1894; d. Montpellier, 27 July 1982) - Deputy
- Charles de Casaulx (20 March 1547; d. Marseille, 17 February 1596) - Premier Consul
- Jean Chevallier (31 July 1897; d. Saumur, 14 November 1985) - Vichy French governor of Sigmaringen (1945–1949)
- Désirée Clary (8 November 1777; d. Stockholm, 17 December 1860) - Queen of Sweden
- François Clary (24 February 1725; d. Marseille, 20 January 1794) - Alderman of Marseille
- Joseph Nicolas Clary (26 March 1760; d. Paris, 6 June 1823) - Pair des Cent-Jours
- Augustin-Eudes-Joseph Durand (7 May 1757) - Deputy
- Jean-Baptiste Estelle (January 1662; d. Marseille, January 1723) - Alderman
- Étienne Garnier-Pagès (27 December 1801; d. Paris, 23 June 1841) - Deputy
- Jean-Claude Gaudin (8 October 1939) - Senator, Mayor
- François Girard (23 July 1761; d. Paris, 26 March 1854) - Deputy for Vaucluse
- François Omer Granet (16 November 1758; d. 10 September 1821) - Deputy
- François Isoard (3 March 1765; d. Aix-en-Provence, 25 September 1795) - secretary of the Club des amis de la Constitution
- Alexandre Marius Jacob (27 September 1879; d. Bois-Saint-Denis (Indre), 28 August 1954) - anarchist
- Antoine de Jessé-Charleval (1836; d. Marseille, 1915) - Mayor of Marseille
- Henri Jibrayel (18 September 1951) - Deputy
- Jean-François Lieutaud (3 March 1754; d. Paris, 19 February 1801) - Commandant général of the garde nationale in Marseille
- Charles-Marie Livon (19 May 1850; d. Marseille, 16 August 1917) - doctor, Mayor of Marseille
- Joseph Mascarel (1816; d. Los Angeles, 1899) - sailor, Mayor of Los Angeles
- Jean-Raymond Mourraille (25 November 1721; d. Marseille, 30 December 1808) - astronomer, Mayor of Marseille
- Émile Ollivier (2 July 1825; d. Saint-Gervais les bains, 20 August 1913) - Minister
- Claude-Charles de Peyssonnel (1727; d. Paris, 1790) - Ambassador
- Paul Peytral (20 January 1842; d. Marseille, 30 November 1919) - Deputy, minister
- Victor Peytral (18 October 1874; d. Draguignan, 20 April 1964) - Deputy, minister
- Michel Pezet (9 April 1942) - Deputy, lawyer
- Germaine Poinso-Chapuis (6 March 1901; d. Marseille, 20 February 1981) - Minister
- François-Trophime Rebecquy (1 September 1744; d. Marseille, 3 May 1794) - Deputy
- Henri Tasso (8 October 1882; d. Marseille, 12 February 1944) - Mayor of Marseille
- Adolphe Thiers (15 April 1797; d. Saint-Germain-en-Laye, 3 September 1877) - President of France
- Michel Vaxès (14 November 1940) - Deputy
- Raymond Valabrègue (25 September 1899; d. Marseille, 18 April 1966) - Deputy for Drôme

=== Religious personalities ===
See also Roman Catholic Archdiocese of Marseille.

- Pierre Barthélemy (Peter Bartholomew) (d. Palestine, 20 April 1099) - soldier, mystic
- Louis-Toussaint Dassy (1 November 1808; d. Marseille, 23 August 1888) - abbot, founder of the institute for young blind
- Jean-Baptiste Fouque (12 September 1851; d. Marseille, 5 December 1926) - priest
- Folquet de Marselha (1155; d. Toulouse, 25 December 1231) - Bishop of Toulouse
- Jean-Pierre Ricard (25 September 1944) - Cardinal

=== Résistants ===
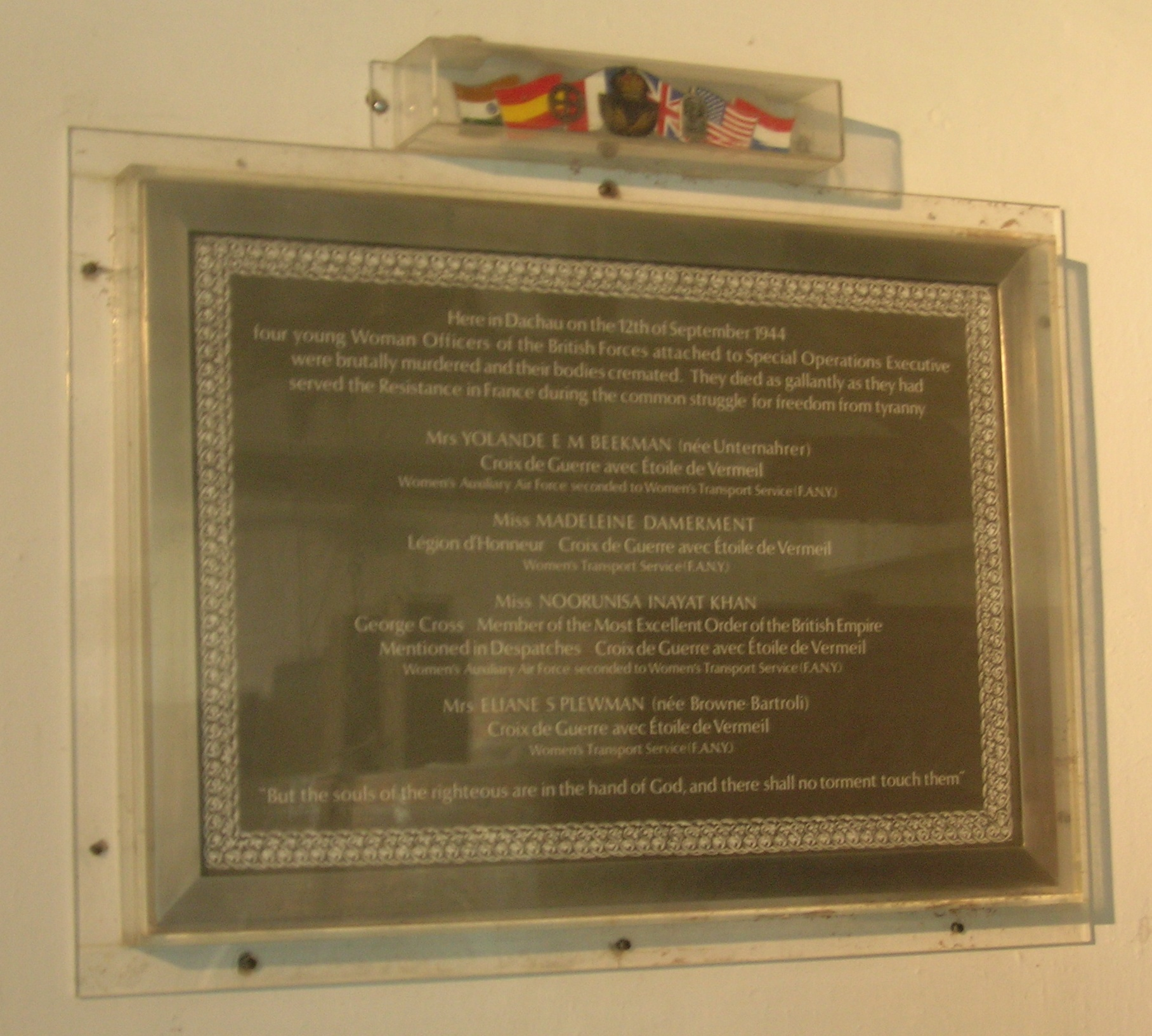
Memorial to Eliane Plewman in Dachau concentration camp

- Berty Albrecht (15 February 1893; d. Fresnes, 1943) - résistante
- Marie-Madeleine Fourcade (8 November 1909; d. Paris, 20 July 1989) - chief of the "Alliance" network
- Louis and Renée Nouveau, businesspeople and members of the Pat O'Leary escape line.
- Éliane Plewman (1917; d. Dachau, 13 September 1944) - résistante

=== Scientists ===
- Elzéar Abeille de Perrin (3 January 1843; d. Marseille, 9 October 1910) - entomologist
- Sabin Berthelot (4 April 1794; d. 10 November 1880) - naturalist, ethnologist
- François Cauvière (13 October 1780; d.|Marseille, 2 October 1858) - surgeon
- Henri Fabre (29 November 1882; d. Le Touvet, 30 June 1984) - engineer, aviator
- Charles Fabry (11 June 1867; d. Paris, 11 December 1945) - physicist
- Max Escalon de Fonton (5 February 1920) - prehistorian, archaeologist
- Jean Baptiste Marie Jaubert (17 March 1726; d. Brignoles, 9 August 1884) - doctor and ornithologist
- Michel Lazdunski (born 11 April 1938) – biochemist
- Henry de Lumley (14 August 1934) - archeologist, geologist and prehistorian
- Frank Merle (22 November 1962) - mathematician
- Fernand Mossé (25 May 1892 – 10 July 1956) - philologist
- Jean-André Peyssonnel (19 June 1694; d. Saint-Bertrand de l'Isle Grande-Terre in Guadeloupe, 24 December 1759) - doctor and naturalist
- Jacques Ricard (1929–2018) – biophysicist
- Guillaume de Saint-Jacques de Silvabelle (28 January 1722; d. Marseille, 10 February 1801) - mathematician, astronomer
- André Turcat (23 October 1921 – 4 January 2016) - test pilot, first pilot of Concorde at supersonic speed

=== Sculptors ===
- César Baldaccini (1 January 1921; d. Paris, 6 December 1998) - sculptor
- Jean-Marie Baumel (2 November 1911; d. Neuilly (Eure), 2 June 1978) - sculptor
- Auguste Carli (12 July 1868; d. Paris, 28 January 1930) - sculptor
- Alice Colonieu (5 November 1924; d. Marseille, 16 July 2010) - sculptor, ceramicist, painter
- Paul Gondard (7 September 1884; d. Marseille, 27 February 1953) - sculptor
- Gustave Guétant (25 May 1873; d. Marseille, 23 July 1953) - sculptor, designer, illustrator
- Jean-Louis Lagnel (8 February 1764; d. Marseille, 16 September 1822) - santonnier
- Henri-Édouard Lombard (21 January 1875; d. Paris, 23 July 1929) - sculptor, Prix de Rome 1883
- Raymonde Martin (15 January 1887; d. Marseille, 7 December 1977) - sculptor
- Pierre Puget (16 October 1620; d. Marseille, 2 December 1694) - painter, sculptor, architect and engineer
- Raymond Servian (18 May 1903; d. Marseille, February 1953) - sculptor
- Élie-Jean Vézien (18 July 1890; d. Marseille, 7 September 1982) - sculptor, engraver and medallist

=== Sportsmen and women ===
- Paul Aymé (29 July 1869; d. Madrid, |25 July 1962) - tennis player
- Élie Bayol (28 February 1914; d. La Ciotat, 25 May 1995) - motor racer
- Jean Boiteux (20 June 1933; d. Bordeaux, 11 April 2010) - swimmer
- Jean Bouin (21 December 1888; d. Xivray (Meuse), 29 September 1914) - long-distance runner
- Alexandre Caizergues (14 March 1979) - kite surfer
- Eric Cantona (24 May 1966) - footballer
- Daniel Costantini (21 October 1943) - handball trainer
- Rolland Courbis (12 August 1953) - footballer, trainer
- Antoine Delpero (1 November 1985) - longboard surfer
- Marcel Dib (10 August 1960) - footballer
- Albin Ebondo (23 February 1984) - footballer
- Jean-Luc Ettori (29 July 1955) - footballer
- Mathieu Flamini (7 March 1984) - footballer
- Wesley Tidjan Fofana (17 December 2000) - footballer
- Laurent Foirest (18 September 1973) - basketball player
- Jessica Fox (11 June 1994) - world and Olympic champion kayaker and canoeist
- Gustave Ganay (21 March 1892; d. Paris, 23 August 1926) - cyclist
- Gérard Gili (7 August 1952) - footballer
- Sébastien Grosjean (29 May 1978) - tennis player
- Lucas Hernandez (14 February 1996) - footballer
- Théo Hernandez (6 October 1997) - footballer
- Myriam Jérusalmi (24 October 1961) - world champion kayaker
- Frank Lebœuf (22 January 1968) - footballer
- Peter Luccin (9 April 1979) - footballer
- Mohamed M'Changama (9 June 1987) - footballer
- William Meynard (11 July 1987) - swimmer
- Alain Mosconi (9 September 1949) - swimmer
- André Moulon (10 August 1935; d. Marseille, 14 April 2009) - footballer
- Anthony Muleta (31 January 1986) - rugby union player
- Samir Nasri (26 June 1987) - footballer
- Louisa Nécib (23 January 1987) - footballer
- Christopher Pratt (1981) - navigator and skipper
- Gaston Rébuffat (7 May 1921; d. Marseille, 1 June 1985) - Alpinist
- Julien Sablé (11 September 1980) - footballer
- Roger Scotti (29 July 1925; d. Marseille, 12 December 2001) - footballer
- Anthony Terras (21 June 1985) - shooting
- Alain Weisz (29 May 1953) - former basketball player, trainer
- Zinedine Zidane (23 June 1972) - footballer

=== Writers ===
- Amédée Achard (22 April 1814; d. Paris, 26 March 1875) - writer, journalist
- Antonin Artaud (4 September 1896; d. Ivry-sur-Seine, 4 March 1948) - writer, poet
- Gilles Ascaride (1947) - writer, sociologist
- Gabriel Audisio (27 July 1910; d. Issy-les-Moulineaux, 26 January 1978) - writer, poet
- Joseph Autran (20 June 1813; d. Marseille, 6 March 1877) - dramatist, poet
- Nicolas Thomas Barthe (1734; d. 17 June 1785) - dramatist, poet
- Auguste-Marseille Barthélemy (11 May 1794; d. Marseille, 23 August 1867) - poet
- Jean-François de Bastide (15 July 1724; d. Milan, 4 July 1798) - polygraph
- Jean-Michel Billioud (1964) - writer
- Maria Borrély (16 October 1890; d. Digne-les-Bains, 22 February 1963) - writer
- Louis Brauquier (14 August 1900; d. Marseille, 7 September 1976) - writer, poet
- Marcel Brion (21 November 1895; d. Paris, 23 October 1984) - writer, art historian, Académicien
- Antoine Bruguière de Sorsum (22 June 1773; d. Marseille, 7 October 1823) - philologist
- Philippe Carrese (6 April 1956) - writer, documentary maker
- Patrick Cauvin (6 October 1932; d. Paris, 13 August 2010) - writer
- Jean de La Ceppède (1548; d. Avignon, 1623) - poet, magistrate
- Jean Contrucci (7 June 1939) - writer
- Gilles Del Pappas (14 December 1949) - writer
- César Chesneau Dumarsais (17 July 1676; d. Paris, 11 June 1756) - philosopher, grammarian
- Joseph Héliodore Garcin de Tassy (1794–1878) - orientalist
- Jean-Christophe Duchon-Doris (2 January 1960) - writer
- Paul Alexandre Dulard (8 March 1695; d. Marseille, 7 December 1760) - poet
- Yann de L'Écotais (14 November 1940; d. Paris, 23 October 2008) - writer, journalist
- René Frégni (8 July 1947) - writer
- Christian Garcin (8 November 1959) - writer
- Victor Gélu (12 September 1806; d. Marseille, 2 April 1885) - poet in Provençal language, Marseilles dialect
- Jean-Baptiste Germain (1701–1781) - Occitan author
- Daniel Giraud (10 January 1946) - writer and translator from Chinese, blues musician
- Léon Gozlan (11 September 1803; d. Paris, 14 September 1866) - writer, associated with Balzac
- Jean-Claude Izzo (20 June 1945; d. Marseille, 26 January 2000) - writer

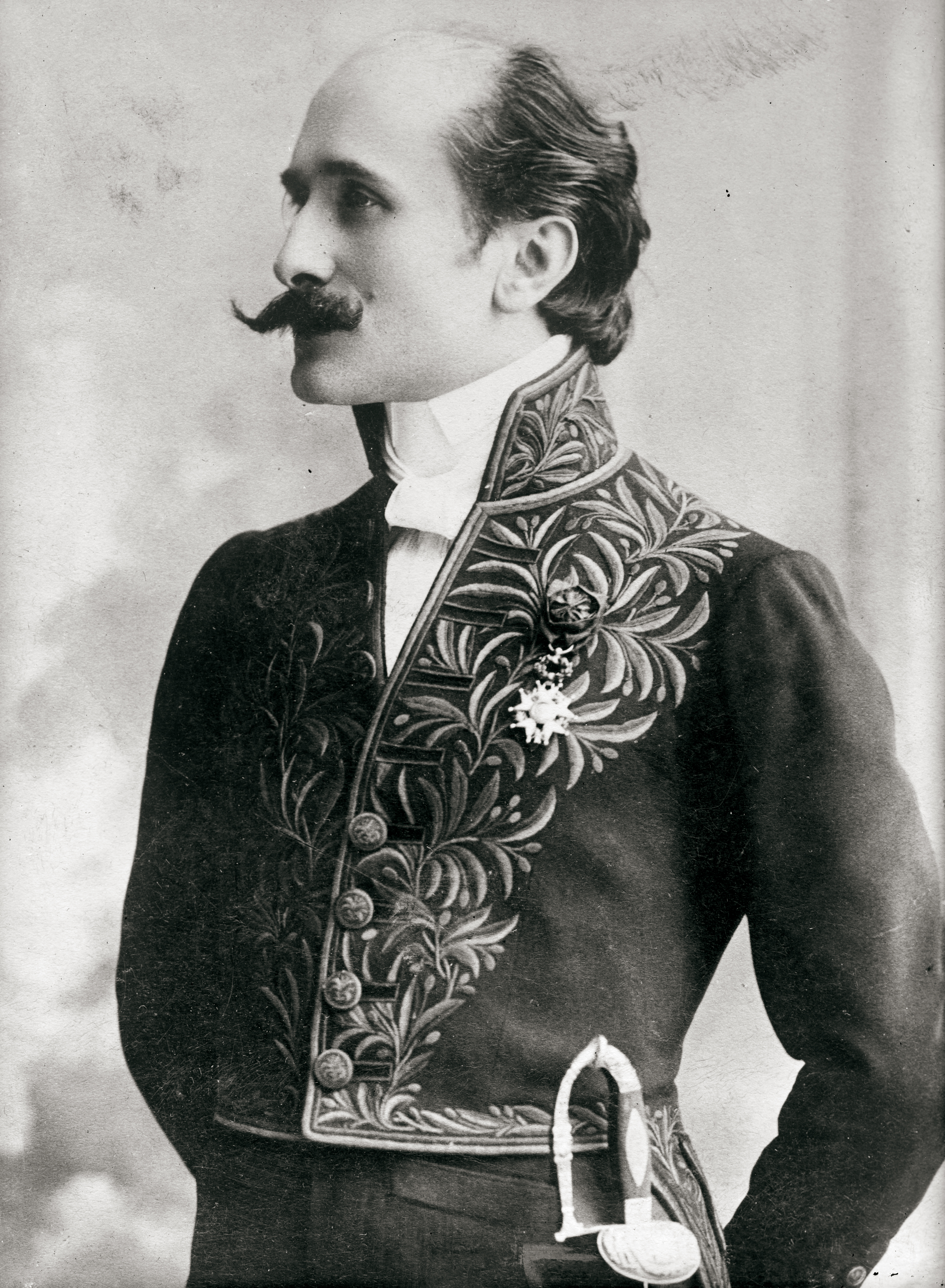
Edmond Rostand

- Edmond Jaloux (19 June 1878; d. Lutry, 15 August 1949) - novelist, literary critic
- Sébastien Japrisot (4 July 1931; d. Vichy, 4 March 2003) - novelist, screenwriter
- Étienne-François de Lantier (1734–1826) - playwright
- Jean-Patrick Manchette (19 December 1942; d. Paris, 3 June 1995) - writer and chronicler
- Joseph Méry (21 January 1797; d. Paris, 20 June 1866) - polygraph
- Thyde Monnier (Mathilde Anna Rose) (23 June 1887; d. Nice, 18 January 1967) - writer
- Marc-Édouard Nabe (27 December 1958) - writer, painter
- Florence Pazzottu (9 November 1962) - poet
- Amélie Pollonais (1835-1898), philanthropist and writer
- Michel Ragon (24 June 1924) - writer
- Charles Rinn (1849–1929) - hellenist, lexicographer
- Edmond Rostand (1 April 1868; d. Paris, 2 December 1918) - dramatic author, Académie française
- André Roussin (22 January 1911; d. Paris, 3 November 1987) - writer of comedies
- Saint-Pol-Roux (15 January 1861; d. Brest, 18 October 1940) - poet
- Eugène Saccomano (23 September 1936) - journalist, writer
- Serge Scotto (15 November 1963) - writer
- Christiane Singer (1943; d. Vienna, 4 April 2007) - writer, essayist and novelist
- André Suarès (12 June 1868; d. Saint-Maur, 7 September 1948) - writer
- Honoré d'Urfé (11 February 1568; d. Villefranche-sur-mer, 1 June 1625) - novelist
- Frédéric Valabrègue (12 January 1952) - novelist
- Jean-Marc Valladier (1957) - writer

== Associated with Marseille ==
Marseille was the place of birth, death or residence of:

- Arthur Rimbaud (died 1891) - poet
- Larry Azouni (born 1994) - football player
- Romain Barnier (born 1976) - freestyle swimmer
- Jean-Claude Beton (1925–2013) - founder of Orangina
- Isabelle Caro (1982–2010) - model and actress
- Georges Chappe (born 1944) - cyclist
- Pierre Demours (1702–1795) - physician
- Cornelius Evans (fl. 1648), a Marseille native and an impostor
- Jean-Baptiste Benoît Eyriès (1767–1846) - geographer, author and translator
- Rémy Di Gregorio (born 1985) - cyclist
- Henri-Irénée Marrou (1904–1977) - historian
- Charles-Joseph-Eugene de Mazenod (1782–1861) - bishop of Marseille and founder of the Missionary Oblates of Mary Immaculate
- Pavlos Melas (1870–1904) - Greek army officer
- Darius Milhaud (1892–1974) - composer
- Jonathan Santiago (born 1994) - football player
- Sacha Sosno (born 1937–2013) - sculptor
- Hippolyte Mireur (16 March 1841; d 1914) - physician involved in public health policies in Marseille
