= Cruoriopsis =

Scientific classification
- Domain: Eukaryota
- Clade: Archaeplastida
- Division: Rhodophyta
- Class: Florideophyceae
- Order: Peyssonneliales
- Family: Peyssonneliaceae
- Genus: Cruoriopsis; Dufour

Genus of algae

Cruoriopsis is a genus of non-corraline red algae. It has sometimes been considered a synonym of Cruoriella Crouan & Crouan or part of the larger genus Peyssonnelia.

== Taxonomy ==
The taxonomy of Cruoriopsis and some other genera now in the family Peyssonneliales, including Cruoriella and Cruoria, have been the subject of much discussion over decades. Cruoriopsis first became synonymous with Cruoriella, which in turn became synonymous with Peyssonnelia. Despite the fact that Cruoriopsis is an unaccepted name taxonomically, four species remain within Cruoriopsis incertae sedis: C. danica, C. ensisae, C. hauckii, and C. reinboldii.

The holotype species of this genus was originally described and named Cruoriopsis crucialis in 1865. However, this is no longer the accepted name and it was reclassified as Peyssonnelia armorica in 1916. Another species in a different genus, Cruoriella armorica, that was described in 1869 is now also considered synonymous with P. armorica.
