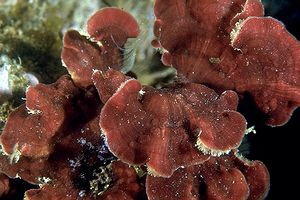
- Peyssonnelia squamaria

Scientific classification
- Domain: Eukaryota
- Clade: Archaeplastida
- Division: Rhodophyta
- Class: Florideophyceae
- Order: Peyssonneliales
- Family: Peyssonneliaceae
- Genus: Peyssonnelia; Decaisne, 1841

= Peyssonnelia =

Genus of algae

Peyssonnelia is a genus of thalloid red alga, named after naturalist Jean-André Peyssonnel (1694–1759) It includes the algae commonly known as rumoi-iwanokawa, mayoi-iwanokawa and akase-iwanokawa. Specimens can reach around 20 cm in size. Peyssonnelia produces tetraspores.

== Taxonomy and Nomenclature ==
Peyssonnelia belongs to class Florideophyceae, of the order Peyssonneliales and Family Peyssonneliaceae. There are 89 currently recognized species as of 2021. Its lectotype is Peyssonnelia squamaria. The genus is the largest in the Peyssonneliaceae.

=== Segregate Genera ===
The genera Cruoriella and Cruoriopsis are sometimes considered to be part of Peyssonnelia, but a 2007 dissertation by Krayesky separates them.

== Morphology ==
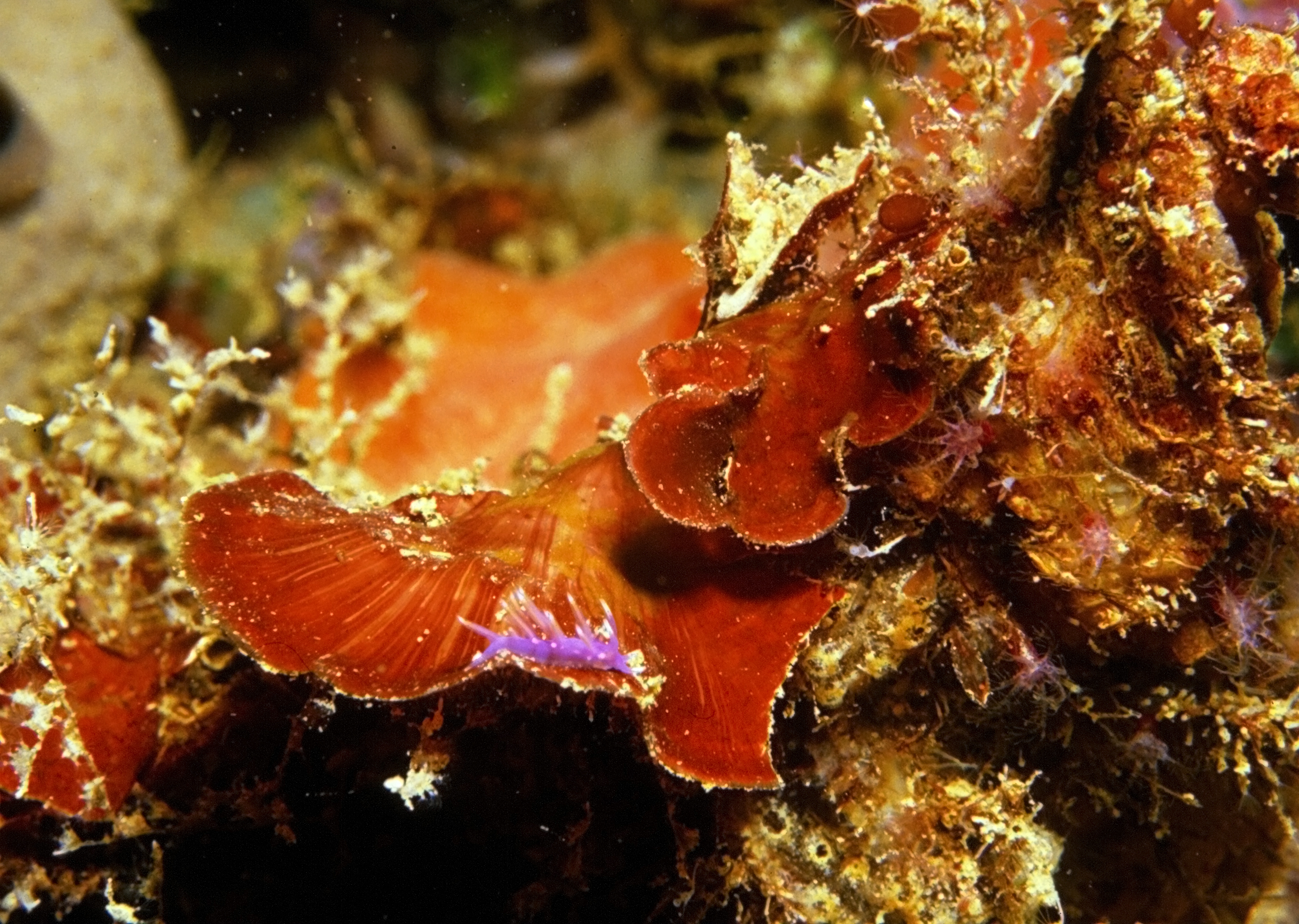
Peyssonnelia squamaria (S. G. Gmelin) Decaisne, 1839 (Gery, 2011)

The genus is calcareous and is characterized by crustose, prostrate thalli attached to the substrate by uni- or multicellular rhizoids. Thalli may be partially or fully calcified, with calcium carbonate deposited as aragonite crystals. It also exhibits a dorsiventral thallus arrangement. The cells are arranged in 2 or 3 layers: The hypothallus or the basal layer lies more or less parallel to the substratum, with the perithallus layer lying over it in the form of erect filaments. In some species, a middle layer known as a mesothallus is present. Most species have a simple morphology and a highly variable anatomy. They differ from other coralline algae such as Corallineaceae via their reproductive structures, which are confined to nemathecia - external pustules which form from the surface cells.

== Distribution ==
The genus is distributed in arctic and temperate to subtropical and tropical waters.

== Ecology ==
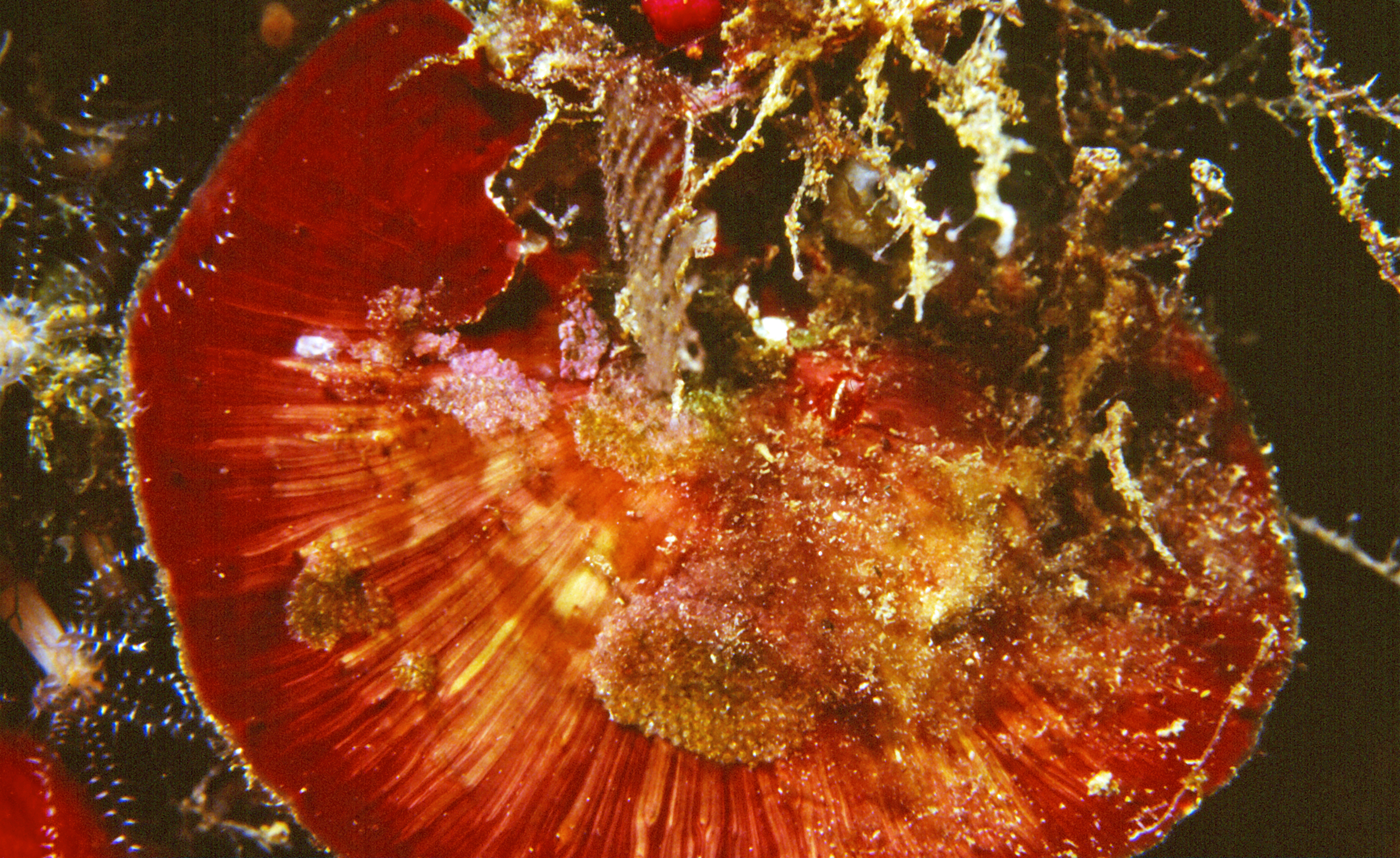
Peyssonnelia squamaria (S. G. Gmelin) Decaisne, 1839 (Gery, 2011)

Peyssonnelia occurs in intertidal to shallow subtidal waters, and have also been found to occur in deep-water habitats, existing as far as 288 m depths in the Bahamas, which makes them some of the deepest occurring photosynthetic organisms. Being a calcareous alga, Peyssonnelia contributes to consolidating and building coral reefs. This also makes them among the algae which are vulnerable to ocean acidification. However, a study in 2018 found that while CO_{3} concentrations of Peyssonnelia squamaria decreased after exposure to elevated CO_{2} levels, the photosynthetic performance actually increased, suggesting that the species has the capacity for self-regulation under acidic conditions, and may benefit from a more acidified ocean.

== Life History ==
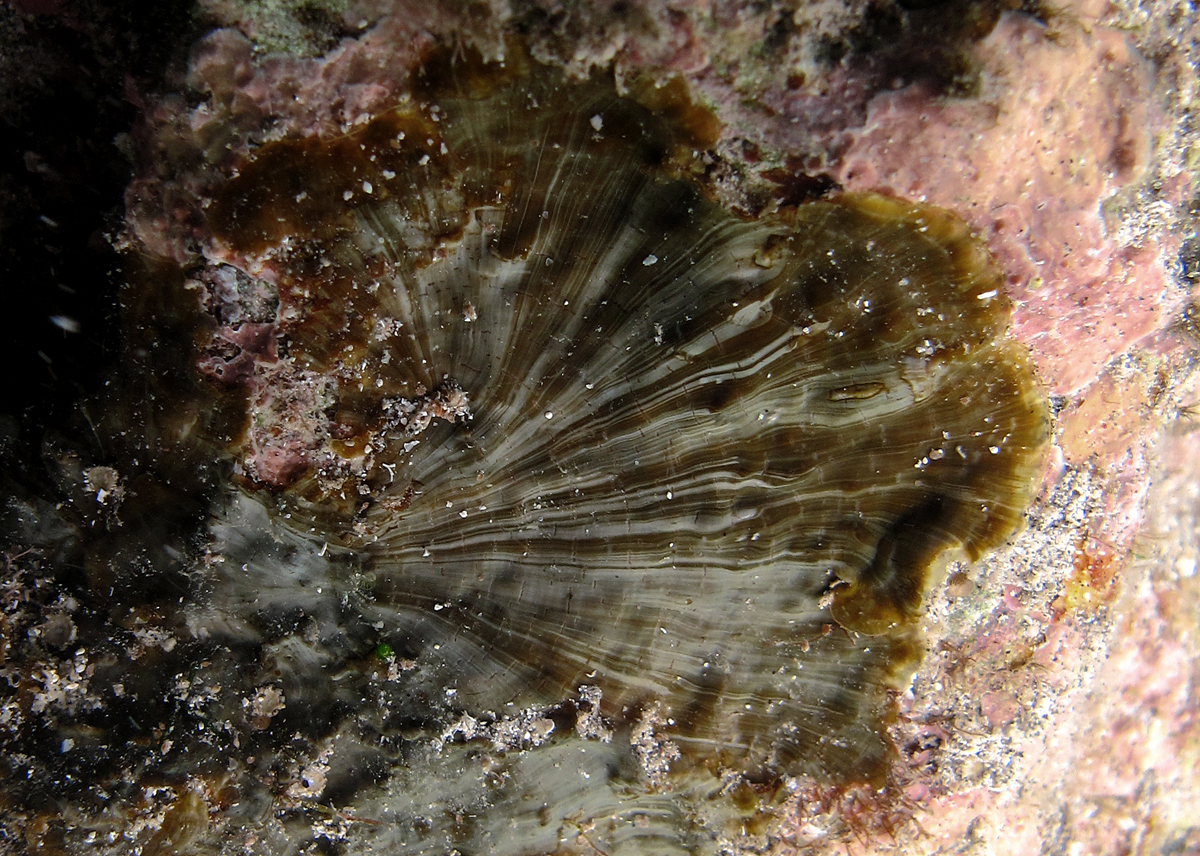
Peyssonnelia sp. from Reunion Island (Bourjon, 2014)

A study conducted on nine Peyssonnelia species collected from Spain found that most species possessed fertile tetrasporophytes in Autumn, suggesting this is the season of peak reproduction, followed by spring. Information on the life cycle of Peyssonnelia is limited, however, based on culture studies, tetraspores grow into discs and can reach up to 300 um in 10 days. Gametangial sori develop and release gametes and develop into carposporangia.

== Chemical Composition ==
A study in 2009 found that extracts of a certain Peyssonnelia species contained peyssonoic acids A-B (1-2), which are growth inhibitors for bacteria (Pseudoalteromonas bacteriolytica) and fungal pathogens (Lindra thalassiae) of marine algae, as evidenced by strong antimicrobial activities in the ecological assays. It was also reported that Peyssonnelia sp. inhibited another fungal pathogen, Dendryphiella salina, but not through peyssonoic acids A-B (1-2), suggesting it has other secondary metabolites to defend against the fungus which remain unexplored. Peyssonoic acids A-B (1-2) were also tested for inhibition of human ovarian cancer cell lines, with 2 showing higher inhibitory activity than 1. These results suggest the pharmaceutical potential of Peyssonnelia and warrant further research into the chemical components of this genus.

== Cultivation and Utilization ==
Currently there does not appear to be any literature on the cultivation or utilization of Peyssonnelia since information regarding its chemical composition is currently rather limited.

== Species ==
The species currently recognized are:

- P. abyssica
- P. antiqua
- P. armorica
- P. asiatica
- P. atropurpurea
- P. balanicola
- P. bicolor
- P. boergesenii
- P. bornetii
- P. boudouresquei
- P. calcea
- P. capensis
- P. caulifera
- P. clarionensis
- P. conchicola
- P. coriacea
- P. crispata
- P. dawsonii
- P. delicata
- P. distenda
- P. dubyi
- P. evae
- P. flavescens
- P. foliosa
- P. foveolata
- P. guadalupensis
- P. hairii
- P. hancockii
- P. hariotii
- P. harveyana
- P. imbricans
- P. immersa
- P. inamoena
- P. indica
- P. intermedia
- P. involvens
- P. japonica
- P. johanseni
- P. lemoinei
- P. luciparensis
- P. luzonensis
- P. magdalenae
- P. magna
- P. mariodinalis
- P. maris-rubri
- P. mariti
- P. meridionalis
- P. mexicana
- P. neocaledonica
- P. nitida
- P. nordstedtii
- P. novae-hollandiae
- P. obbesii
- P. obscura
- P. orientalis
- P. pacifica
- P. polymorpha
- P. profunda
- P. rara-avis
- P. replicata
- P. rosa-marina
- P. rosenvingei
- P. rubra
- P. rugosa
- P. rumoiana
- P. simulans
- P. splendens
- P. squamaria
- P. stoechas
- P. thomassinii
- P. valentinii
