= Joseph Garibaldi =

French painter

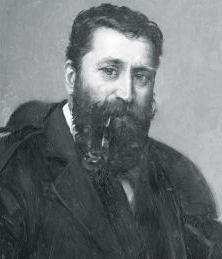
Joseph Garibaldi; portrait by Paul Saïn (1902)

Joseph Garibaldi (12 May 1863 – 6 May 1941) was a French painter, specializing in cityscapes and coastal scenes.

== Biography ==
He was born in Marseille. His father, an employee of the Noilly Prat distillery, was originally from Italy. Louis Prat, one of the firm's owners, noticed that Joseph had artistic talent and persuaded his father to let him be enrolled at the École supérieure des beaux-arts de Marseille. A visit from the famous artist, Antoine Vollon, was decisive. Under his influence and advice, Garibaldi held his first exhibit at the Salon. They also became close friends, and he would be a trusted assistant during Vollon's final illness.

He would exhibit regularly at the Salon from 1884 to 1914; receiving a second-class medal in 1897. He specialized in scenes of coastal ports, including Cassis, which he visited from 1884 to 1899, and La Ciotat, but his favorite would always remain the Old Port of Marseille.

Until 1905, he benefitted greatly from the patronage of Baron Alphonse de Rothschild, who bought his paintings and donated them to provincial museums. In 1906, he exhibited landscapes at the Exposition coloniale de Marseille and was awarded a travel grant to Tunisia the following year. For the remainder of his career, he received significant support from his friends Étienne Martin, José Silbert and Édouard Crémieux who were, successively, the Directors of the Association des Artistes Marseillais.

Apart from brief trips to Venice and Corsica, he was content to remain in his home district. After World War I, he took advantage of accommodations that had been provided for him in Fos-sur-Mer. During the 1930s, he gradually developed glaucoma and was forced to stop painting. He died in 1941 in Marseille.

Two major retrospectives have been held: Les terres marines de Joseph Garibaldi at Cassis in 2006, and Joseph Garibaldi, le Midi paisible at the Palais des Arts of Marseille in 2012. His works may be seen at the Musée de Cahors Henri-Martin, Musée des beaux-arts de Marseille and the Musée Ziem.

== Selected paintings ==
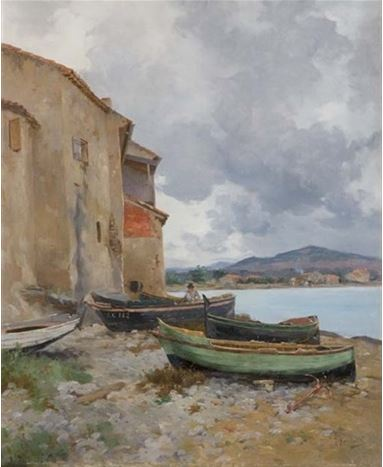
The Port of
Saint-Cyr les Lecques

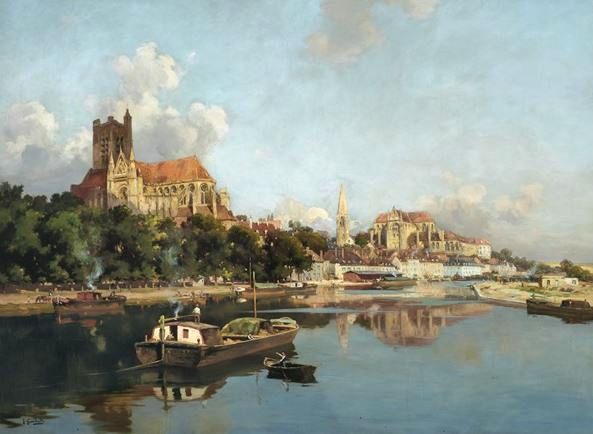
View of Auxerre Cathedral

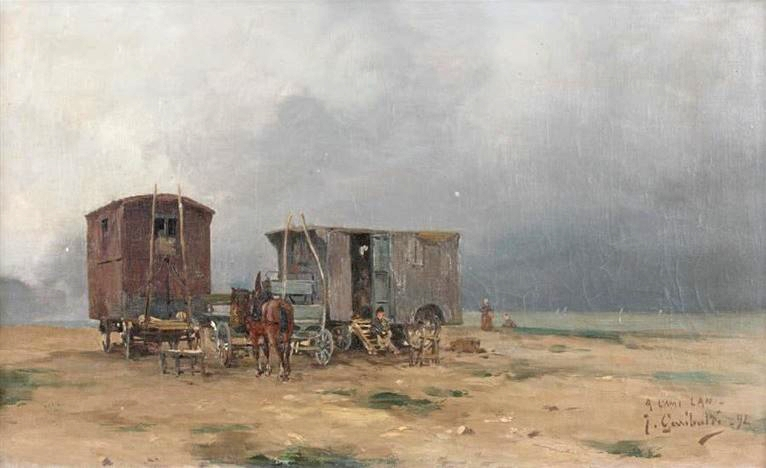
Gypsy Camp

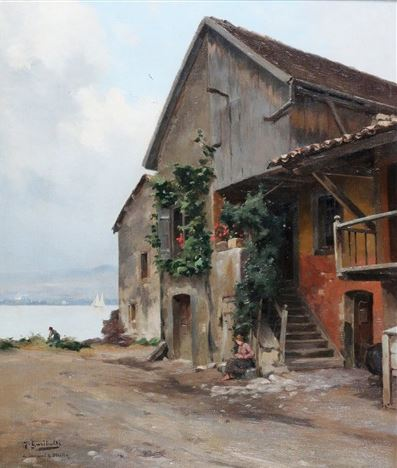
Chalet in Pontcarré
