= Blancard =

Blancard may refer to:

- Amable Guy Blancard (1774–1853), general of the 1st French Empire
- Jean Blancard (1914–2008), French engineer and high-ranking official
- Louis Blancard (1831–1902), French archivist and numismatist
- Pierre Blancard (1741–1826), French botanist and explorer
- René Blancard (1897–1965), French film actor and screenwriter
- Saint-Blancard, a commune located in the Gers department of France
