= Cruoriella elegans =

Scientific classification
- Clade: Archaeplastida
- Division: Rhodophyta
- Class: Florideophyceae
- Order: Peyssonneliales
- Family: Peyssonneliaceae
- Genus: Cruoriella
- Species: C. elegans

Binomial name
- Cruoriella elegans Nozawa, 1968

Species of alga

Cruoriella elegans is a species of red algae in the family Peyssonneliaceae. It is found in the southern islands of Japan.
