= Étienne Martin (painter) =

French painter, composer and writer

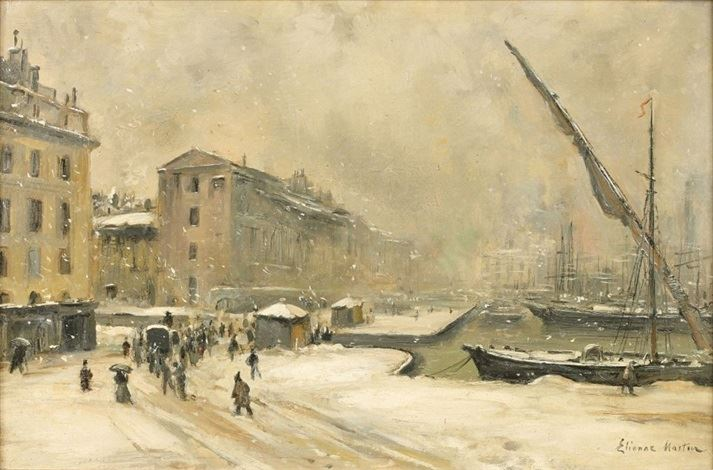
Port in the Snow

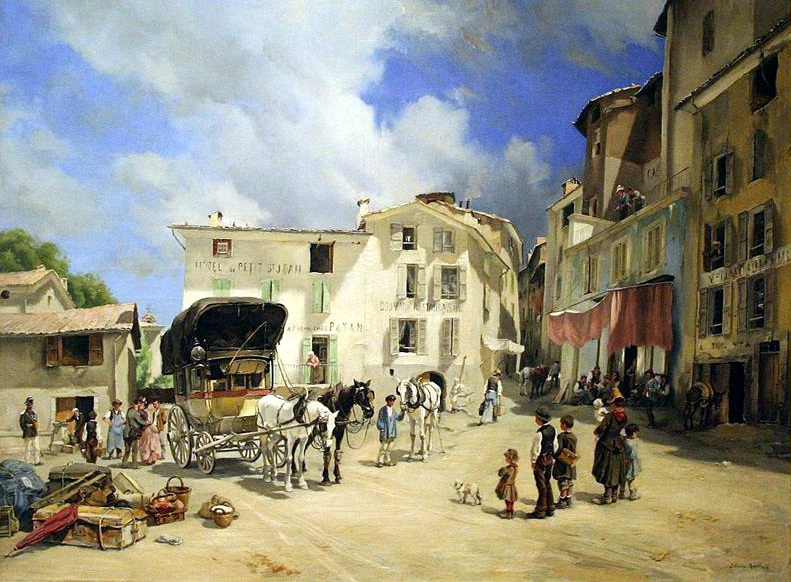
The Relay Coach

Étienne Philippe Martin (27 July 1856, Marseille – 6 March 1945, Marseille) was a French painter, composer and writer.

== Biography ==
His father, Paul Martin, was a watercolorist. He began as a pianist, but suffered from hand cramps and switched to composing instead. Gradually, he turned to painting, taking lessons from his father, then studying oil painting with Antoine Vollon, who had a permanent influence on his style. Later, he would write Vollon's biography. He was also inspired by the works of Alphonse Moutte, Director of the École des Beaux-Arts de Marseille.

He participated in the Paris Salon from 1876 to 1932, receiving an honorable mention in 1885. He was awarded a silver medal at the Exposition Universelle (1889).

In 1903, he was elected a member of the Académie de Marseille. When his father died in 1905, he was appointed to replace him as the Curator of the Musée Gassendi in Digne-les-Bains; a position he held until his death. He was also Chairman of the museum's Board of Directors from 1906 to 1912. From 1912 to 1916, and again from 1920 to 1923, he was President of the Association des Artistes Marseillais.

He was the author of several works in addition to Vollon's biography; notably Réflexion d'un artiste sur la science, where he explores his feelings about progress and science. Many of his works have a nostalgic tone.

In addition to the Musée Gassendi, his works may be seen at the Musée des beaux-arts de Dijon, Musée des beaux-arts de Marseille, Musée Cantini, Musée des beaux-arts de Rouen and the Musée d'art de Toulon.
