= Chevalier d'Herbain =

French baroque composer

Jean-Louis Cuchot d'Herbain
- Born: April 10, 1720; Strasbourg, France
- Died: May 28, 1768 (aged 48); Paris, France
- Occupations: Baroque composer, Military captain
- Known for: Composing operas and music
- Notable work: Il geloso, Il trionfo del Giglio, Les Deux talents, and others

Jean-Louis Cuchot d'Herbain (Chevalier d'Herbain; 10 April 1720 – 28 May 1768) was an 18th-century French baroque composer with a professional career in the military.

== Short biography ==
Born in Strasbourg, d'Herbain was destined to a military career, and became a captain in the regiment of Tournaisis. While he was stationed in Italy, he began to compose operas: Il geloso (Rome, 1751), Il trionfo del Giglio (Bastia, 1751) and La Lavinia (Bastia, 1753).

Back in Paris, he composed the music for the ballet Célime (1756) and the opéras comiques Les Deux talents (1763, on a libretto by Jean-François de Bastide) and Nanette et Lucas (1764, on a libretto by Nicolas-Étienne Framery). Some of his vocal works, including many ariettes, enjoyed lasting success.

He died in Paris aged 48.

== Works ==
- 1751: Il geloso, intermezzo
- 1751: Il trionfo del Giglio / Le Triomphe du lys, opera
- 1753: La Lavinia, opera
- 1756: Iphis et Célime, ou Le Temple de l'indifférence détruit pas l'amour, opera-ballet
- 1763: Les Deux talents, opéra comique
- 1764: Nanette et Lucas, ou La Paysanne curieuse, comedy, prose with ariettes
