= Amélie Pollonais =

French philanthropist and writer

- Born: 1835; Marseille, France
- Died: July 24, 1898 (aged 62–63); Cap Ferrat, France
- Spouse: Désiré Pollonais

Amélie Pollonais (1835 – July 24, 1898) was a French philanthropist and writer.

== Biography ==
Amélie Pollonais was born into a Jewish family in Marseille, the daughter of Joseph-Jonas Cohen.

In 1868, she published Rêveries maternelles, outlining a comprehensive system of education for children. The following year, she released La Philosophie enfantine, a self-instruction method for children.

Pollonais gained recognition for her dedication to aiding the wounded during the Franco-Prussian War, earning her the Red Cross Society medal. Her visits to the peasant huts of Villefranche-sur-Mer inspired her most important work, A travers les mansardes et les écoles (1886).

Pollonais was one of the founders of the Gazette des Enfants, and from 1887 onwards contributed to the Foyer Domestique. In 1898, she founded a society focused on prisoners and released convicts, documenting her progress in La Femme. She served as the president of the Société des Beaux-Arts of Nice.

After her death, Place de la Marine and Boulevard de Saint-Jean in Villefranche were renamed in her honor.
