= Jean-Baptiste Bertrand (physician) =

French physician

Jean-Baptiste Bertrand (July 12, 1670, in Martigues, Provence – September 10, 1752) was a French medical doctor and a member of the Académie de Marseille.

== Biography ==
Jean-Baptiste Bertrand comes from a commercial family in Martigues. He studied at the Jesuit college in Marseille. His father intended him for the ecclesiastical state, but having made the acquaintance of a renowned doctor in Avignon, he turned to medicine and studied in Avignon and Montpellier. He moved to Marseille around 1707 and acquired a good reputation. During the plague of Marseilles which occurred in 1720 he devoted himself without counting towards the plague-stricken and wrote a book Relation historique de la plague ; in this work, he shows himself to be a true precursor of microbial ideas: "The difference between our domestic insects and those of the plague is that the latter are invisible and so small that. Bertrand belonged to what has been called the contagionist school, while his adversaries asserted that the disease which decimated Marseille was in no way epidemic.

He was one of the founding members of the Académie de Marseille and became one of its most regular members at meetings.

== Works ==
- Baptiste Bertrand, Cologne, Pierre Marteau,1721
- Baptiste Bertrand, Amsterdam and Marseilles, Jean Mossy,1779
