= Anthony Muleta =

French rugby union player

- Born: January 31, 1986 (age 40) Marseille, Bouches-du-Rhône
- Height: 1.73 m (5 ft 8 in)
- Weight: 107 kg (236 lb)

Rugby union career
- Position: Hooker
Senior career
Years	Team	Apps	(Points)
2007-Present	RC Toulon	8	(0)

Anthony Muleta (born January 31, 1986) is a French rugby union player, who plays as a hooker for RC Toulonnais.

== Career ==
- Since 2007 : RC Toulon

== Honours ==
- Pro D2 Champions : 2008

== See also ==
- Rugby in France
