= Jean Marie Rebischung =

- Born: 30 March 1962 (age 64)
- Origin: France
- Genres: Instrumental, electronic, new-age, folk
- Occupation: Composer
- Instruments: Piano, Synthesizer, Keyboards, Drums, Percussion, Guitar
- Years active: 2002
- Website: rebischung.wix.com

Jean Marie Rebischung is a French composer born 30 March 1962, in Marseille, France.

== Biography ==
Composer of music series qigong, tai chi, and yoga from Beatrice and Patrick Reynier.

Inspired by Asian traditional songs, Jean Marie made electronic songs, and completely in the style that was previously developing in concept albums.

== Movies ==
Original music from: ( French version )

- Qi Gong pour s'assouplir : étirement dynamique des méridiens
- Qi Gong pour s'assouplir : étirement postural des méridiens
- Qi Gong pour tous : 1000 mains sacrées
- Qi Gong: les 8 pièces de brocart et les 5 animaux
- Qi Gong les 18 exercices du tai ji qi gong
- Tai Chi Chuan forme 8 mouvement spirales
- Tai Chi Chuan forme 23
- Tai Chi Chuan applications martiales
- Ashtanga Vinyasa Yoga découvrir les bases
- Ashtanga Vinyasa yoga approfondir la pratique
- Ashtanga Vinyasa yoga maitriser la première série

== English version ==
- The 18 Tai Chi Qi Gong - The 8 Pieces of Brocarde and the 5 Animals
- Tai Chi, Discover and begin to practise the Art of Tai Chi
