= La Femme (magazine) =

Erstwhile French women's magazine

La Femme: journal bi-mensuel was a French magazine for women between 1879 and 1937 published by the French Union nationale des amies de la jeune fille. It was published once or twice a month.
