= Pierre Blancard =

French botanist and explorer (1741–1826)

Pierre Blancard (born 21 April 1741 in Marseille – deceased 16 March 1826 in Aubagne) was a French navy officer, botanist and explorer. He was the first to import Chinese chrysanthemum in France.

== Life ==
After being promoted to the rank of captain following several campaigns in the Caribbean with his father, Pierre Blancard left Bombay for China in 1787. There he discovered the chrysanthemum, sacred flower of the emperor. There he managed to obtain cuttings of three varieties, that he brought back to France in 1789. Only one variety, a purple cultivar of Ku-Hoa, survived the journey and bloomed in Marseille the next year, as well as in the Jardin des Plantes of Paris, to where Abbé Thomas of Ramatuelle had sent it. Jacques Martin Cels sent some plants to England where they bloomed in 1791.

After the publishing of the tales of his travel in the East, in which he defends the principles of free enterprise against the monopoly of large companies and the Asian long distance trade, Blancard was admitted to the Marseille Académie on 7 April 1808.

== Tributes ==
- A street of Aubagne is called Promenade Pierre Blancard after him; a commemorative plaque, placed at the door of a handicapped centre, narrates the introduction of the chrysanthemum by Blancard.
- In Marseille, the Impasse Pierre Blancard bears his name.

== Publications ==
- Manuel du Commerce des Indes Orientales et de la Chine, Marseille, 1806, 600p.

== Sources ==
- Didier Bernard, La Fleur d'or : le chrysanthème, son histoire, sa culture, les principales variétés, Gunten, 2007,
- Arthur Paecht & Florence Cyrulnik, Le Voyage des plantes : Le jardin botanique de la Marine 1766–1890, La Seyne-sur-Mer, Musée Balaguier, Géhess, 2008, p. 23
