= Jean-Michel Sanchez =

Jean-Michel Sanchez (born 28 June 1969 in Marseille, Bouches-du-Rhône) is a contemporary French art historian, organist, improviserand musicologist.

== Biography ==
Jean-Michel Sanchez holds a doctorate in art history from the University of Aix-Marseille I. His thesis is entitled Les buffets d'orgues du Sud-Est de la France de la fin de l'Ancien Régime à la Grande Guerre. A specialist in sacred art, he was lecturer at the University of Provence (2005–2011) and currently teaches at the University of Free Time of Aix-Marseille and at the Dominican International University (Université Domuni). His research focuses on the architecture and decoration of French, Italian and Spanish churches (17th-19th centuries), but also on the whole of their contents: chasublery, goldsmithery, art of campanology, organs, liturgical furniture ... He has been a member of the "Centre International d’Études sur le Linceul de Turin" (Paris) since 1999. He has curated several exhibitions of sacred art (abbaye de Saint-Victor, Maison de l'Artisanat et des Métiers d'Art, Musée de Château-Gombert, Marseille).

As musicologist, he was titular organist of the Chartreux church in Marseille (1985–2006). He is currently co-organist of the church of the Mission de France in Marseille since 1994. His research in this field concerns the role of the organ in the liturgy and the evolution of professions of church musician from the Council of Trent to the Second Vatican Council. He has collaborated in the restoration of several historical organs (Saint-Maximin, La Brigue, Saorge, Tende, Rozay-en-Brie, Barjols) and has given recitals in France, Italy and Spain. He participated in the festivals "Orgue en Ascension" (Tournus) and "15h non stop, Orgue et Grégorien" (Luxeuil-les-Bains). He recently inaugurated the organ of the Saint-Eloi church in Bordeaux, blessed by Cardinal Jean-Pierre Ricard.

== Works ==
=== Books ===
- 2017: Sainte Marie Madeleine, apôtre des apôtres, éd. Grégoriennes, Gap, 128 p.
- 2015: Saint Joseph, image du Père, éd. Grégoriennes, Gap, 128 p.
- 2015: Coauthor of: Cathédrales de Provence, éd. La Nuée Bleue, Strasbourg, 612 p.
- 2014: Coauthor of: Lille, la grâce d'une cathédrale, éd. La Nuée Bleue, Strasbourg, 420 p.
- 2013: Coauthor of: Joseph Pougnet, prêtre-architecte (1829-1892) ou le Moyen Âge et l’Orient revisités, éd. de la Thune, Marseille, 181 p.
- 2011: Coauthor of: La chartreuse de Marseille : une vision retrouvée. Histoire, études et restaurations, Images en manœuvres éditions, archives municipales de Marseille, 96 p.
- 2010: L’orgue d’Eyguières touché par Frédéric Chopin, Association "Les Amis de l’orgue de l’église Notre-Dame de Grâce d’Eyguières", 62 p.
- 2009: Jérusalem, Rome, Compostelle… et la Provence. Reliques et reliquaires, éditions Grégoriennes, Gap, 208 p.
- 2005: Orgues, le chœur des anges, éditions Le Bec en l’air, Manosque, 175 p.
- 1996: Une église de Marseille depuis le XVIIe siècle : la Mission de France, éditions de la Thune, Marseille, 120 p.
- 1995: Cartusia Villae Novae Hanc Massiliensem Fundavit Anno MDCXXXIII, 1795-1995, Dom Joseph de Martinet, imprimerie Saint-Jacques, Marseille. 45 p.
- 1991: Coauthor of: Les Isnard, une révolution dans la facture d'orgues, Edisud, Aix-en-Provence, 262 p.

=== Articles ===
- 2009: Les buffets d’orgues de Provence (1772–1915) in L’Orgue. Bulletin des Amis de l’Orgue (Paris), 1st trimester 2009, No 285, 103 p.
- 2007: L’Eglise, l’administration et l’artiste : processus de commande du mobilier et des ornements d’églises de la fin de l’Ancien Régime à 1905 in Bulletin de l’E.S.SO.R. Équipe Scientifique de Soutien à la Recherche, histoire des Arts méditerranéens. 1760-1914, Université de Provence, No 15, June, 10 p.
- 2003: L’abbaye de Saint-Pons à Nice : une œuvre de Filippo Juvarra influencée par Pierre Puget ? in Provence Historique, vol. LIII, fascicule 213, July–August 2003, p. 377-384.
- 1997: La chapelle de la Charité : espace symbolique, fonctionnel et liturgique in Revue Marseille. No 177, p. 64-68, under the dir. of J.-J. and M. Ch. Gloton.
- La Mission de France sous l'épiscopat d'Eugène de Mazenod in Revue Marseille No 179, p. 68-73, under the dir. of Pr Régis Bertrand.
