= Joseph-Marius Avy =

French painter (1871–1939)

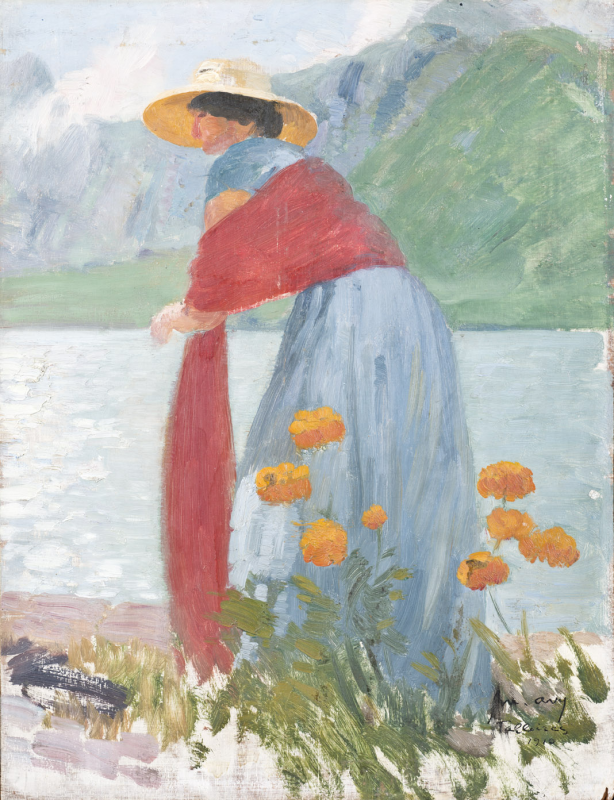
Joseph Marius Jean Avy - Femme au châle rouge au bord du lac

Joseph-Marius Avy (Marseille, September 21, 1871 - Paris, December 29, 1939) was a French painter of landscapes, genre scenes and wall decorations, an illustrator and a pastelist.

== Biography ==
Joseph Marius Jean Avy, known as Marius Avy, was born in Marseille into a wealthy family. His father was a businessman. After his first studies he manifested the desire to undertake the path of art, following his own inclinations. He was therefore sent to Paris, where he was a pupil of Léon Bonnat and Albert Maignan.

From 1900 until 1933 he regularly exhibited at the "Salon des artistes français" and, from 1934 to 1939, the year of his death, at the "Salon de la Société nationale des beaux-arts".

In 1900 he won the Marie Bashkirtseff Prize, in 1903 he was awarded the second class medal and, in 1937, the "Diplôme d'honneur". He was awarded the title of Knight of the Legion d'honneur and, ten years later, was promoted to Commander. During the First World War he was decorated with the Cross of War.

In 1909 Avy married Germaine Besnard, daughter of the painter Albert Besnard, having as best man at the wedding the artist Henry Lerolle.On this occasion he assisted his father-in-law in arranging the canvases that decorated the dome of the Petit Palais. Albert Besnard portrayed him in uniform in a 1916 pastel.

Joseph Marius Avy often painted Italian landscapes. Some of his compositions of worldly life, such as the Bal en blanc, painted with a particular harmony of very contrasting colors, can be considered apart for their distinct dynamism. His decorations include the wedding hall of the Rotterdam Town Hall.

After the death of his wife Germaine, Joseph Avy married Clotilde Pregniard on May 12, '39 at the age of 67, but in December of the same year he died at his home in Paris on rue Boissonade.

== Works ==
- Joseph-Marius Avy, Uranie, 1928, Boulogne-Billancourt, musée des Années Trente
- Joseph-Marius Avy, Bal Blanc, 1903, Paris, Petit Palais

== Gallery ==
The ball

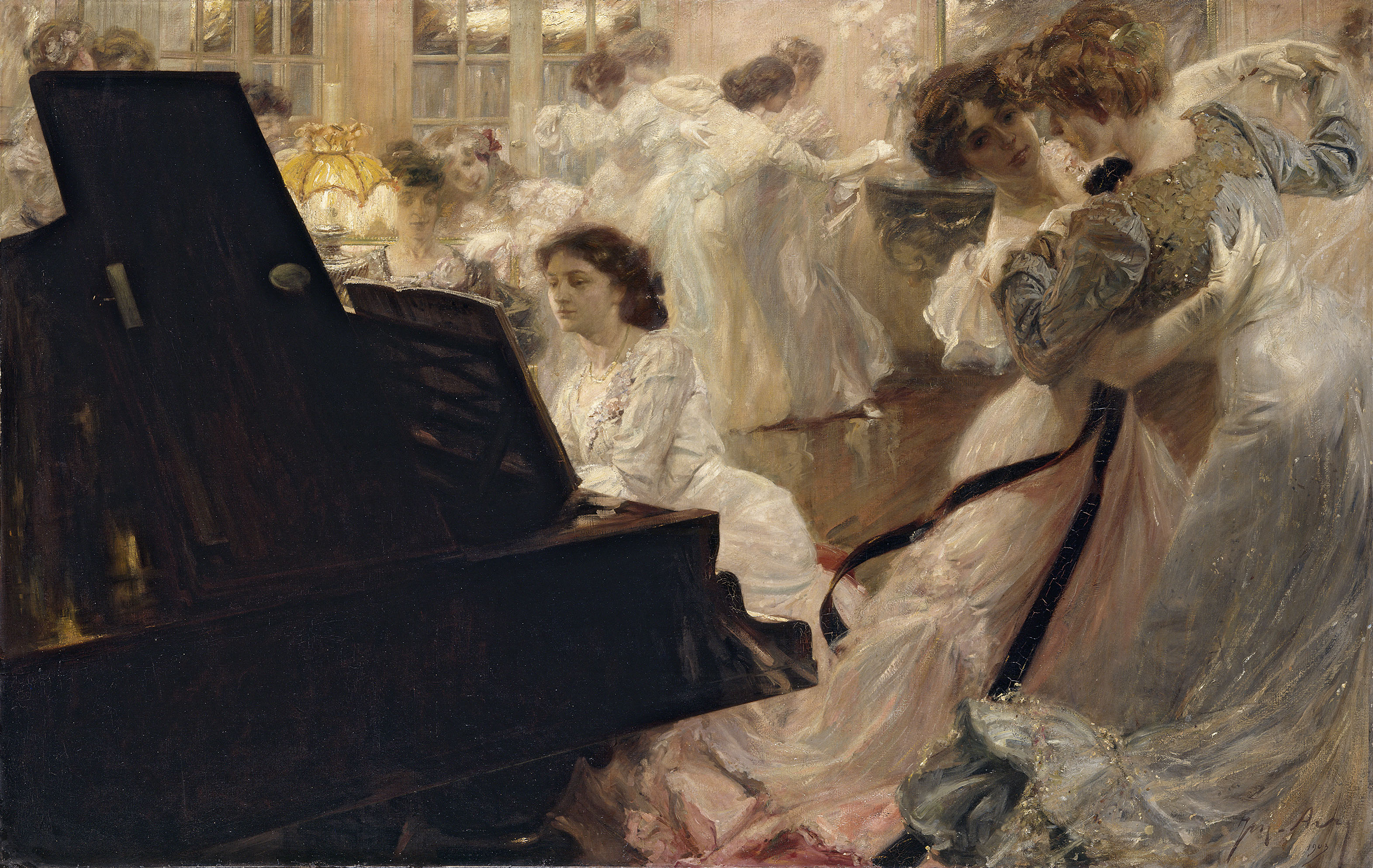
Ballo in bianco

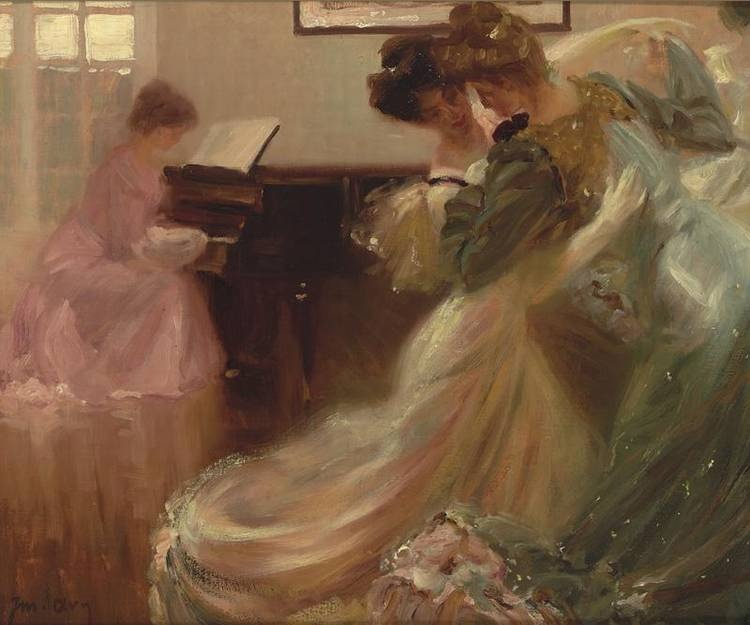
Il Valzer

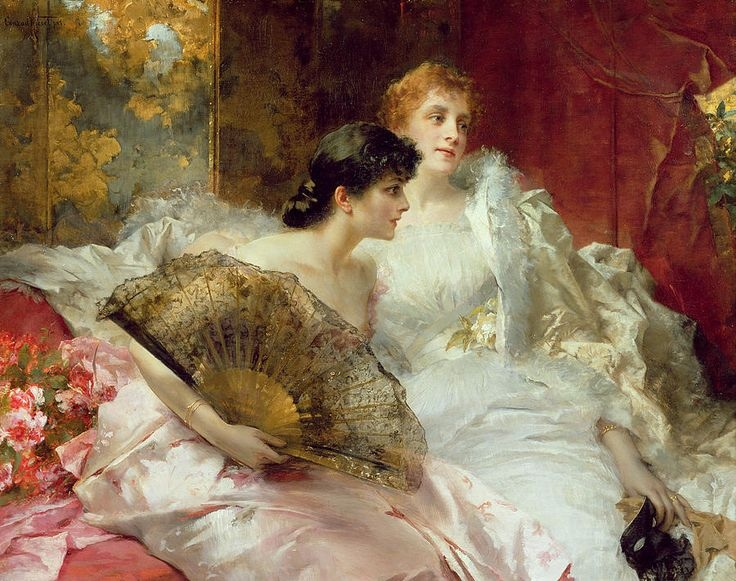
Dopo il ballo

Genre Scenes

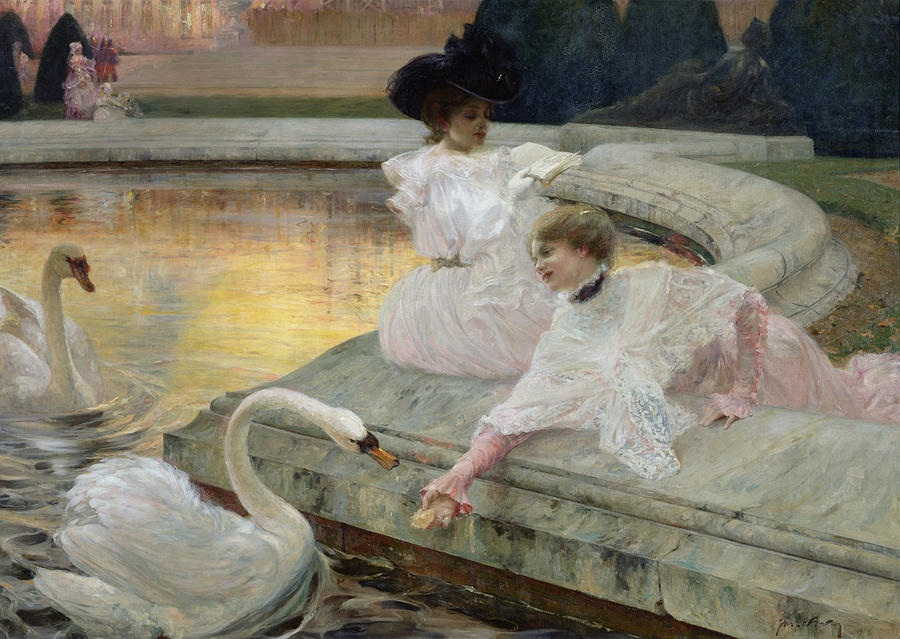
I cigni

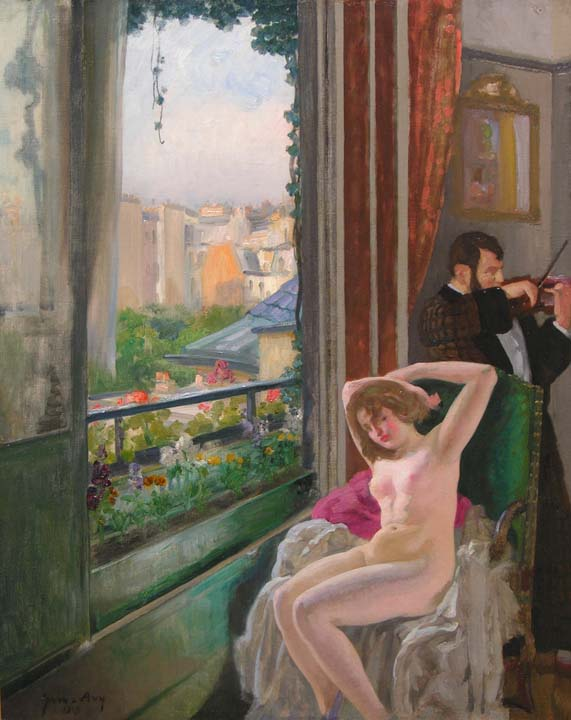
Il riposo della modella

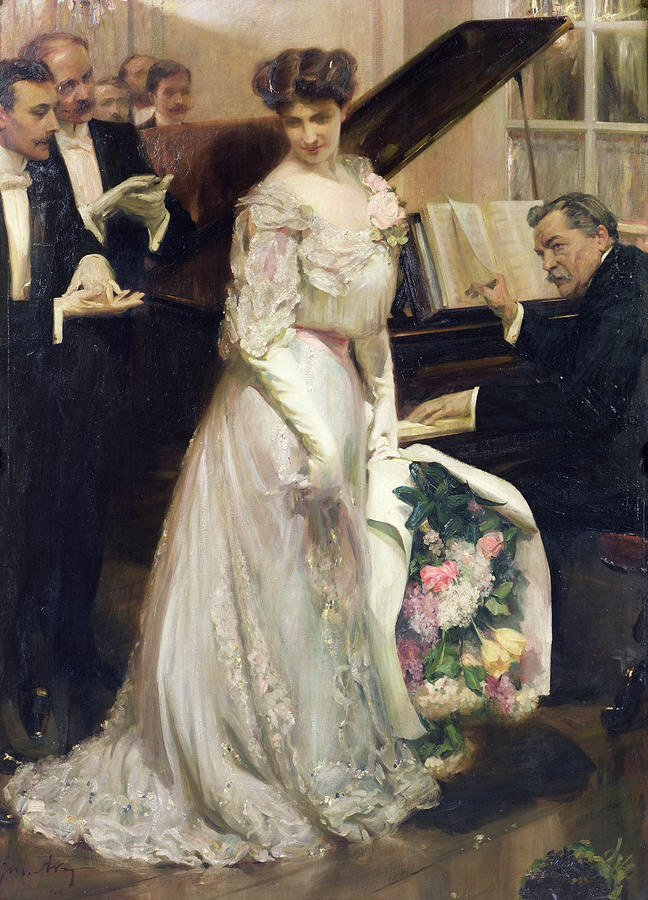
La festeggiata, 1906
Palazzo di belle arti di Lilla

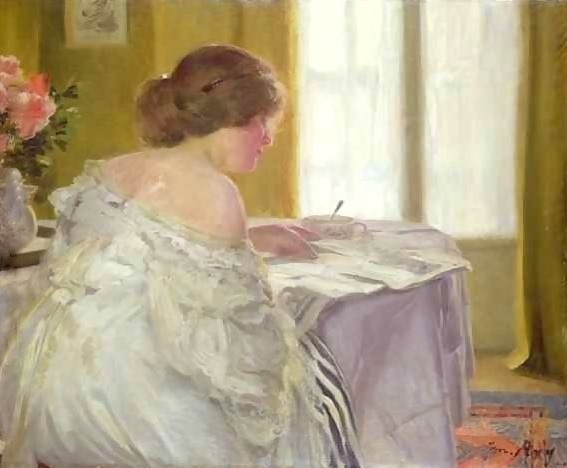
La lettura

== Bibliography ==
- Dictionnaire critique et documentaire des peintres, sculpteurs, dessinateurs et graveurs de tous les temps et de tous les pays (in French). Vol. 1. Gründ. 1999. ISBN 2700030117.
- Edouard-Joseph, Dictionnaire biographique des Artistes Contemporains, 1910-1930, Libreria Gründ, Parigi, 1934
- Gérald Schurr (1979). Valeurs de demain. Les petits maîtres de la peinture 1820-1920. Vol. 4. Parigi: Les éditions de l'Amateur. ISBN 2859173781.
- K. E. Schmidt: Avy, Joseph Marius Jean. In: Ulrich Thieme, Felix Becker (Hrsg.): Allgemeines Lexikon der Bildenden Künstler von der Antike bis zur Gegenwart. Begründet von Ulrich Thieme und Felix Becker. Band 2: Antonio da Monza–Bassan. Wilhelm Engelmann, Lipsia, 1908. S. 285 (Textarchiv – Internet Archive).
- Dati biografici ed Opere di Joseph Marius Jean Avy possono essere reperiti nel "Niederländischen Institut für Kunstgeschichte".

== Other projects ==
- Wikimedia Commons contiene immagini o altri file su Joseph-Marius Avy
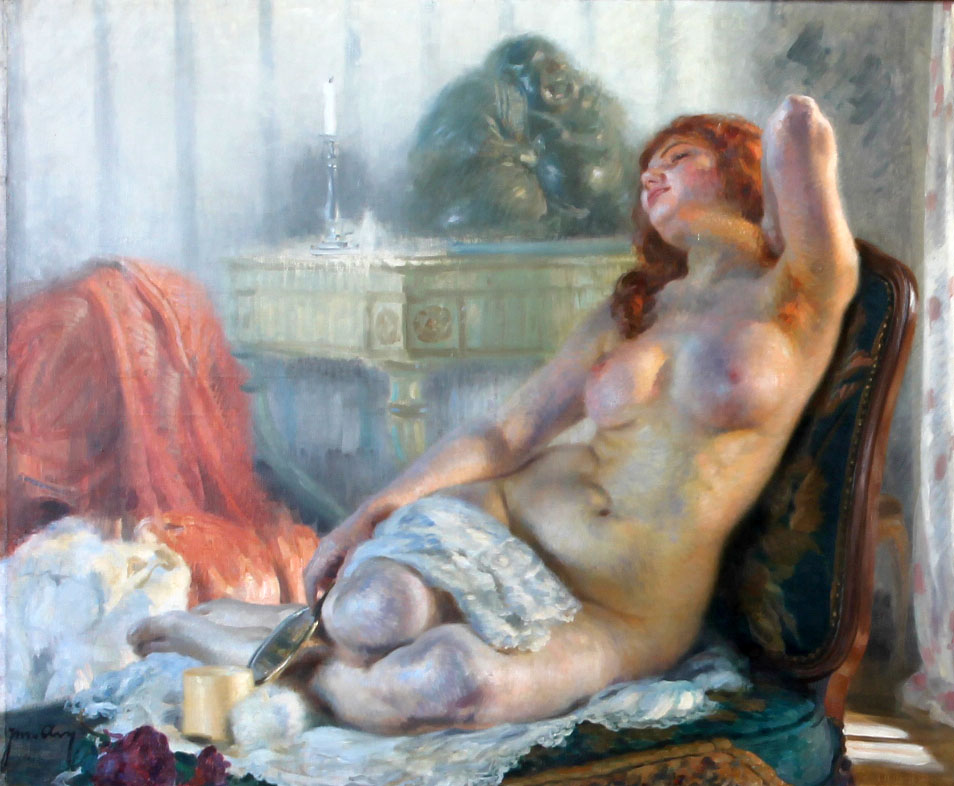
Nudo
