= Rugby in France =

Rugby in France may refer to:

- Rugby union in France
- Rugby league in France
