= Jean-André Peyssonnel =

French physician and naturalist

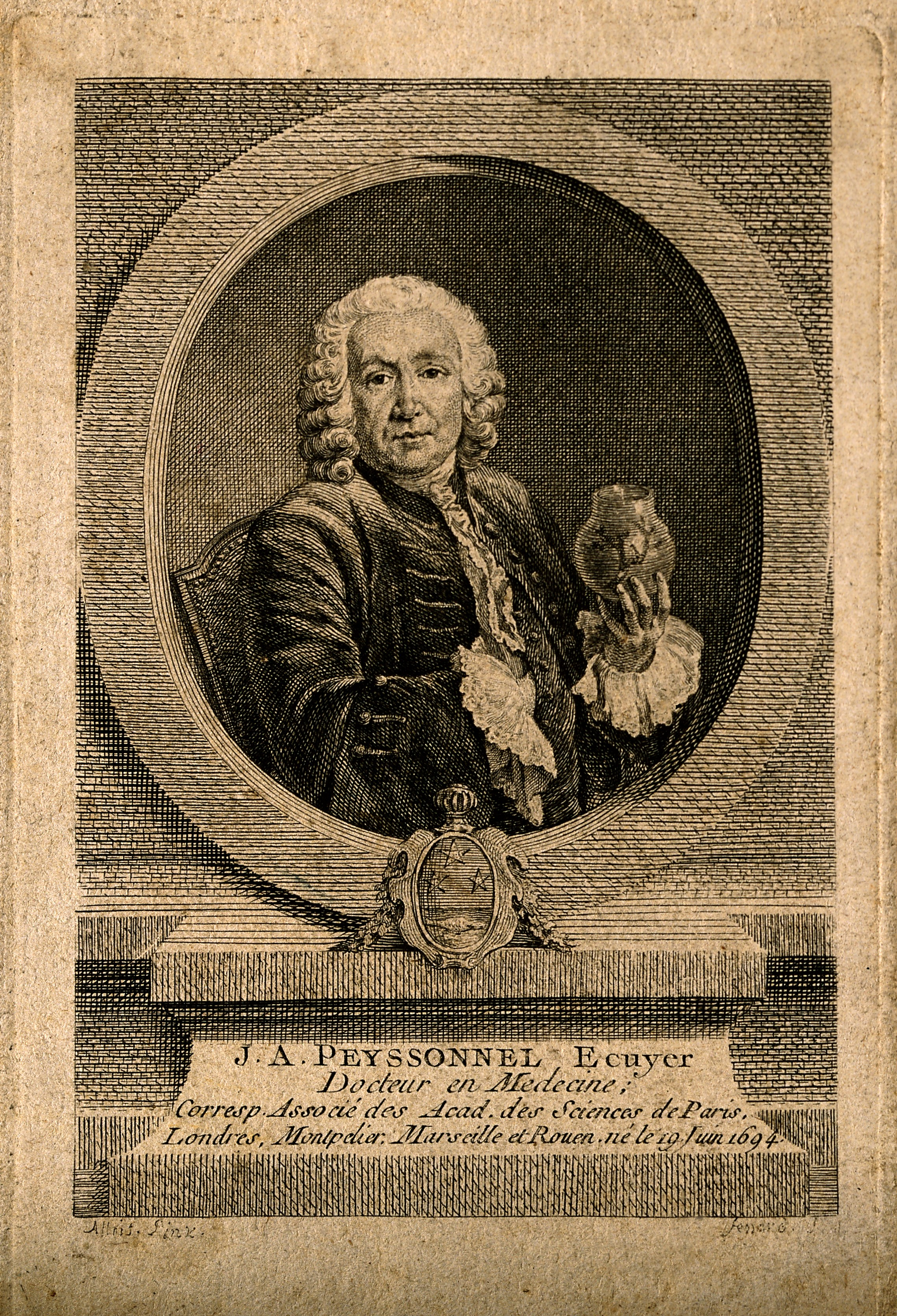
Jean-André Peyssonnel, Esq,. engraving by Étienne Fessard.

Jean-André Peyssonnel (19 June 1694, Marseille, Provence – 24 December 1759, Saint-Bertrand, Guadeloupe) was a French physician and naturalist, known for his work in marine natural history.

Content is translated from the existing French Wikipedia article; see its history for attribution.

== Biography ==
Peyssonnel undertook his education at the Oration College in Marseille, where he was very attentive to the history of science, and after he obtained the degree of doctor of medicine in 1718 from the University of Aix-en-Provence. After beginning his career as a naturalist, his debut as a physician came also in 1720 during the Great Plague of Marseille, where his devotion to the sick earned him an annual royal stipend. The closeness of the sea and his scientific curiosity pushed him towards research into marine "productions" like coral, sponges, and algae.

The count Luigi Ferdinand Marsigli (1658-1730), the founder of the Institute of Bologna, initiated him into the study of natural history. He undertook several voyages along the Mediterranean Coast to study the attributes of coral. The Paris-based Académie des sciences named Peyssonnel as a correspondent in 1723, which he continued to serve as until his death.

He went to North Africa in 1724, and composed his notes under the title Voyage dans les régions de Tunis et d'Algers, and drew an accompanying map, "Carte nouvelle des royaumes de Tunis et d’Alger" (1726). On his return to Marseille, he participated in the founding of the Académie de Marseille (1726).

Named a royal physician to Guadeloupe in 1727, he soon became embroiled in some controversies over a presumed epidemic of leprosy spreading from enslaved Africans to French colonists. Although his local reputation suffered from his unpopular decision to send leprosy sufferers to La Désirade, a deserted island east of Guadeloupe, in an effort to keep the disease from spreading further. Some of his writings about leprosy were eventually published in England.

Mostly he spent his time undertaking additional research related to his love of natural history. He composed a description of Guadeloupe's volcano, La Soufrière, and sent it to the Academy of Marseille in 1733. He continued correspondences with French men of science about various topics that interested him: hurricanes, sea sponges, madrepores, hot springs.

He and his family lived for more than twenty years in Guadeloupe, moving soon after their arrival from the government seat of Basse-Terre in the southwest of the island to the new parish of Saint-Bertrand on the northern shores of Grande-Terre. There he seems to have interacted with not only other French colonists, but also some of the Carib Indians in those rocky lands. He owned African-descendant slaves, and members of both groups seem to have aided in his exploration of the island, and its flora and fauna. One manuscript treatise he sent to his friends at the Academy in Marseille contained extended thoughts about the differences between white and black people. He speculated, as would other French colonial medical professionals like Pierre Barrère, that Africans had thicker blood, an erroneous supposition. He also engaged in biblical exigency about whether enslaved Africans should be actively converted to Christianity and considered part of the human family--as a monogenesist, he answered yes.

Peyssonnel's research into maritime life, especially corals, was his life's passion. In 1750, he argued in letters sent to his patron at the Académie des sciences that corals belonged to the animal kingdom, whereas before they had been considered to be rocks or plants. When his work didn't get published in the scientific journals of France, he sent them instead to science-minded men in London. On 7 May 1752, the London-based academic Royal Society heard a summary of his work read by its Secretary and French correspondent William Watson, who heralded the high quality of Peyssonnel's work. They published sections in the Society's Philosophical Transactions. Nonetheless, his discoveries were overshadowed by Swiss naturalist Abraham Trembley's (1710-1784) discovery of the nature of freshwater polyps (hydra). René-Antoine Ferchault de Réaumur (1683-1757) first doubted this discovery, but afterwards found it convincing in his Mémoire pour servir à l'histoire des insectes. Georges-Louis Leclerc, comte de Buffon (1707-1788), in the seventh chapter of his first Discourse on Natural History wrote that "Peyssonnel had observed and first recognized that corals came from an animal origin." He was more fully recognized for his pathbreaking work on corals in 1778 by M. Collé who confirmed his discovery through chemical analysis and protested energetically against an article by Michel Adanson (1727-1806) in a supplement to the Encyclopédie.

Peyssonnel died December 24, 1759, in Saint-Bertrand parish, in Basse-Terre Guadeloupe.

== Family ==
Peyssonnel was born to Anne Isoard and Charles Peyssonnel (b. 1640), a physician of renown in Marseille, France. His father wrote and published a Cartesian treatise, Histoire de la Machine du Monde, ou de Physique Mechanique. Par le sr. C.P. Docteur en medecine (Marseille, 1704) and a follow-up anonymous work, Lettres de l’auteur de la Physique méchanique (Marseille, 1705), as well as a medical treatise: Dissertation sur la Gangrene des pieds gelez (1709). Dr. Peyssonnel succumbed in 1720 to the bubonic plague at age 80, spending his last days treating his patients in his home city.

His brother, Charles de Peyssonnel, named after their father, was born in Marseille 17 December 1700. In homage to their father, Jean-André and Charles composed and published a treatise in Marseille titled La Contagion de la Peste expliquée et les moyens de s’en préserver (1722). Charles worked first as a lawyer in Aix-en-Provence and then was charged with leading the French consulate in Smyrna, where he died 16 June 1757. Some authors confuse Jean-André with his brother or father (and vice versa).

Peyssonnel married in November 1728, shortly after his arrival in Guadeloupe, to Rose Antoinette PERREË (1712? - 1755). Together they had two sons and five daughters: André Charles (1728-1743); Jeanne Therese (b. 1730); Marie Louise (b. 1733); Margarite Rosalie (b. 1734); Sauveur Germaine (b. 1736); Marie-Rose-Elizabeth (birth year unknown), and Félicité (b. and d. 1755). Peyssonnel lived to see most of his daughters well-wed to prominent French residents of Guadeloupe; his surviving son Sauveur Germaine came to style himself the Sieur de Peyssonnel, and moved to Bordeaux later in life with his Guadeloupe-born wife.

== Published and Manuscript Works ==
- La Contagion de la peste et les moyens de s'en préserver, Marseille, 1722.
- Voyage dans les régences de Tunis et d'Alger, Paris, 1838; réédition, Paris, La Découverte, 1987, avec une présentation et des notes de Lucette Valence.
- [Manuscript], Traité du corail, (Bibliothèque du Muséum)
- [Manuscript], Observation faite sur la montagne dite la Soufrière, dans l'île de la Guadeloupe 1732, Académie de Marseille, sciences physiques.

== Cultural references ==
- A street in Marseilles and a street in Aix-en-Provence are named after him.
- A certain type of red algae (Peyssonnelia) was named in his honor.
