= Jean-François de Bastide =

French writer and playwright

Jean-François de Bastide (15 July 1724, Marseille – 4 July 1798, Milan aged 73) was an 18th-century French writer and playwright.

The son of a magistrate from Provence, Bastide was a polygraph: he wrote novels (Histoire d'une religieuse par elle-même, "Bibliothèque universelle des romans", May 1786, 24 p. in-16), theatre plays, critics, and was also a journalist and a compilator. As a journalist, he published Le Nouveau spectateur (1758–60), Le Monde comme il est (1760–61), Journal de Bruxelles ou le Penseur (1766–67), etc. He also directed the "Bibliothèque universelle des romans" from 1779 to 1789.

As a playwright, he composed:

- 1749: Le Désenchantement inespéré
- 1762: L'Épreuve de la probité
- 1763: Les Caractères de la musique
- 1763: Les Deux talents, opéra comique presented at Comédie Italienne 11 August (music by chevalier d'Herbain)
- 1764: Le Jeune homme, comedy presented in Bordeaux
- 1766: Les Amants opposés, comedy presented in The Hague 11 March
- La Majorité, comedy presented the same day in the same theatre
- 1766: Le Soldat par amour, opéra comique presented in Brussel, at Théâtre de la Monnaie, 4 November (music by Pieter van Maldere and Ignaz Vitzthumb)
- Gésoncourt et Clémentine, tragedy presented the same day in the same theatre.
- La Petite-Maison, published in Contes de M. de Bastide, Paris, L. Cellot, 1763, II, 1, p. 47-88
