= Cornelius Evans =

Cornelius Evans (fl. 1648), was a French impostor.

Evans, a native of Marseille, was the offspring of a Welshman and a woman of Provence. A certain resemblance which he bore to Charles, Prince of Wales induced him to come to England in 1648, and pass himself off as the prince. Taking up his quarters at an inn at Sandwich, Kent, he gave out that he had fled from France because Queen Henrietta, his supposed mother, contemplated poisoning him.

The Mayor of Sandwich paid homage to him, while one of the aldermen lodged him at his own house, and treated him in every respect as the heir-apparent. Evans received these attentions with condescension, and obtained a number of presents from the well-to-do people of the county. His pretense, however, had an undignified ending. A courtier, whom Queen Henrietta and the real Prince Charles sent over expressly, came to Sandwich and denounced Evans as an impostor.

Evans, far from showing any discomfiture, coolly ordered the mayor to take the courtier into custody. Meanwhile, a party of royalists came to seize Evans, who fled by a back door. He was, however, soon captured, conducted to Canterbury, and thence to London, where he was committed to Newgate Prison. He quickly contrived to make his escape, after which nothing more was heard of him.
