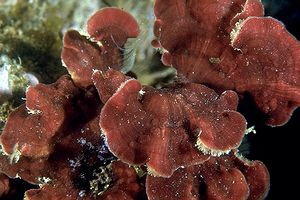
- Peyssonnelia squamaria

Scientific classification
- Domain: Eukaryota
- Clade: Archaeplastida
- Division: Rhodophyta
- Class: Florideophyceae
- Subclass: Rhodymeniophycidae
- Order: Peyssonneliales; D.M. Krayesky, J.N. Norris & S. Fredericq, 2009
- Family: Peyssonneliaceae; Denizot, 1968

= Peyssonneliales =

Peyssonneliales Temporal range: Late Ordovician–Present453–0 Ma

Order of algae

Peyssonneliales is a monotypic order of red algae belonging to the class Florideophyceae and the subclass Rhodymeniophycidae. It contains only one known family, Peyssonneliaceae Denizot, M., 1968.

The type species is Peyssonnelia Decaisne.

== History ==
Genera Peyssonnelia and Sonderopelta were originally in order Gigartinales Schmitz. but comparative morphology and rbcL and nuclear LSU rRNA sequence data showed that they were separate and therefore order Peyssonneliales was established in 2009 to hold them both.

Incendia was initially resolved as a monophyletic clade with full support for rbcL. Then using robust rbcL phylogeny, order Peyssonneliales was lso resolved as monophyletic with well-supported main lineages.

== Description ==
Delineation of the various genera in the Peyssonneliaceae had mostly been based on vegetative characteristics.

Peyssonneliales order algae are red, crustose, prostrate, and usually epilithic (growing on the surfaces of rocks). The crusts may be non-calcified throughout, calcified throughout, or partially calcified (with hypobasal calcification (situated posterior to the basal wall) between the attachment rhizoids). Calcium carbonate, if present, is in the mineral form aragonite (James et al., 1988). The lower surfaces of the crusts are partially to completely attached to the sub-stratum, either directly (i.e., without rhizoids) or by unicellular or multi cellular rhizoids. Prostrate growth is by radiating marginal rows of transversely dividing apical initials in the basal layer (multi axial). These growths then later divide vertically to form a single upper or lower perithallial cell (surrounding the thallus). The first section of the perithallial cells gives rise to simple or branched filaments that together form a loose to compact upper- only cortex or upper and lower cortices. Cortical cells have numerous discoid or ribbon- like chloroplasts.

The red algae colour comes from photosynthetic pigments (phycoerythrin, phycocyanin, allophycocyanin). Then the various blends of relative amounts of these 3 and chlorophyll, influences the plant colour, which can vary from dark red to blue, brown, or greenish.

== Genera ==
As accepted by AlgaeBase (with number of species per genera);

- Agissea Pestana, Lyra, Cassano & J.M.C Nunes - 14 spp.
- Brasilophycus Pestana, Lyra, Cassano & J.M.C.Nunes - 2 spp.
- Chevaliericrusta Denizot, 1968 - 1 sp.
- Cruoriella P.Crouan & H.Crouan, 1859 - 4 spp.
- Cruoriopsis Dufour - 4 spp.
- Incendia K.R.Dixon, 2013 - 10 spp.
- Metapeyssonnelia Boudouresque, Coppejans & Marcot, 1976 - 5 spp.
- Olokunia Pestana, Lyra, Cassano & J.M.C. Nunes - 5 spp.
- Peyssonnelia Decaisne, 1841 - 68 spp.
- Piriora Ngati Kuri & W.A.Nelson - 1 sp.
- Polystrata Heydrich, 1905 - 6 spp.
- Pulvinia Hollenberg, 1970 - 1 sp.
- Ramicrusta Zhang Derui & Zhou Jinghua, 1981 - 19 spp.
- Rhodowynnea Pestana, Lyra, Cassano & J.M.C.Nunes - 3 spp.
- Riquetophycus Denizot, 1968 - 1 sp.
- Seiria K.R.Dixon, 2018 - 2 spp.
- Sonderophycus Denizot, 1968 - 4 spp.
- Squamaria Zanardini - 1 sp.

Former genera; Gymnosorus Trevisan, Haematostagon Strömfelt, Lithymenia Zanardini, Nardoa Zanardini and Sonderopelta Womersley & Sinkora

WoRMS doesn't accept the genera; Agissea, Brasilophycus, Olokunia, Piriora, Rhodowynnea and Squamaria.
It also notes; Cruoriopsis is accepted as synonym of Peyssonnelia, Haematostagon Strömfelt, 1886 is accepted as synonym of Peyssonnelia, Lithymenia Zanardini, 1863 is accepted as synonym of Peyssonnelia Sonderopelta Womersley & Sinkora, 1981 is accepted as synonym of Sonderophycus.

== Distribution ==
The order has cosmopolitan distribution, worldwide. They are found in places such as Brazil, western Atlantic Ocean, San Andres Island, (in the Caribbean Sea), Jamaica (also in the Caribbean Sea), Puerto Rico, Gulf of California (Pacific Ocean), Hawaii, Azores (Atlantic Ocean), Brittany in France, southern Australia, New Zealand, also parts of Asia (near Indonesia, Thailand, South Korea and China).

They can grow at low depths, from the Intertidal zone, (between 90–120 m (295–394 ft) in western Atlantic Ocean), or down to depths as low as 288 m (945 ft) below sea level in the Pacific Ocean (near California).

Members of Peyssonneliales can be found growing on hard substratum (bedrock), or found growing on corals.

== Uses ==
Peyssonnelia has anti-viral abilities.

== Ecology ==
Peyssonneliaceae make thick, brown/dark red growths that may have a soft top above a hard base. Fish do not eat it, allowing it to grow and smother corals. Peyssonneliaceae also keep coral from successfully reproducing sexually by preventing coral larvae from settling.

== Other sources ==
- Ballantine, D. L., Lozada-Troche, C. & Ruíz, H. 2014. Metapeyssonnelia tangerina (Peyssonneliaceae, Rhodophyta), a new species associated with coral reef habitats in Puerto Rico, Caribbean Sea. Phycol. Res. 62:197-205.
- Ballantine, D. L. & Ruiz, H. 2005. Two Peyssonnelia species (Peyssonneliaceae, Rhodophyta) from Puerto Rico including Peyssonnelia flavescens sp. nov. Phycologia 44:328-34.
- Bassi, D., 1997. Vegetative anatomy and palaeoecology of Polystrata alba (Pfender) Denizot, 1968 (Cryptonemiales, Peyssonneliaceae) (Late Eocene, Northern Italy). Revue de Paléobiologie 16 (2):309-320.
- Dixon, K.R. & Saunders, G.W., 2013. DNA barcoding and phylogenetics of Ramicrusta and Incendia gen. nov., two early diverging lineages of the Peyssonneliaceae (Rhodophyta). Phycologia 52: 82–108. DNA barcoding and phylogenetics of Ramicrusta and Incendia gen. nov., two early diverging lineages of the Peyssonneliaceae (Rhodophyta)
- Sherwood, A.R., Paiano, M.O., Spalding, H.L. & Kosaki, R.K. 2020. Biodiversity of Hawaiian Peyssonneliales (Rhodophyta). 2. Sonderophycus copusii, a new species from the Northwestern Hawaiian Islands. ALGAE 35: 145–155. Biodiversity of Hawaiian Peyssonneliales (Rhodophyta): Sonderophycus copusii sp. nov., a new species from the Northwestern Hawaiian Islands
