= Polygraph (author) =

Author who writes in a variety of fields

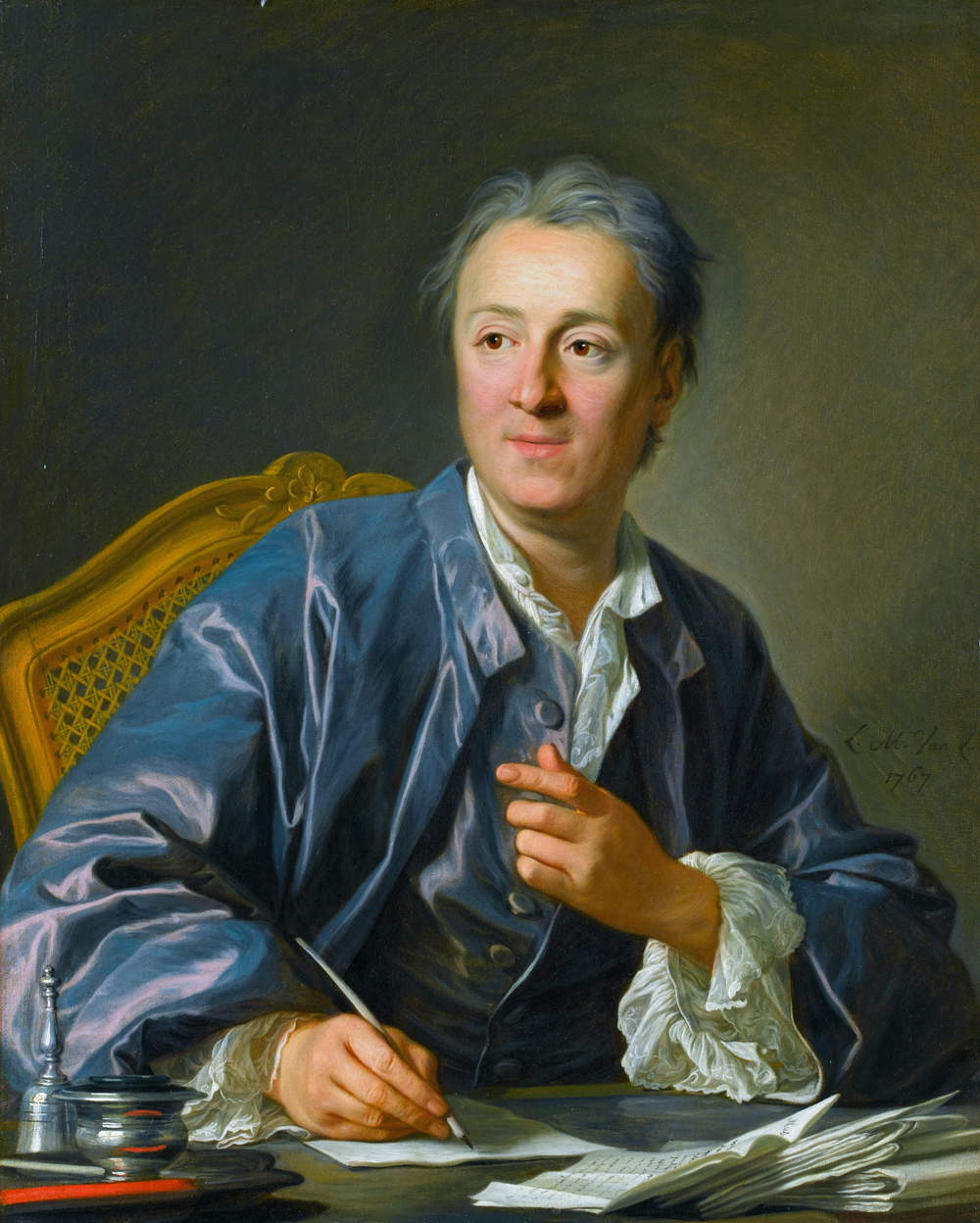
Portrait of Denis Diderot by Louis-Michel van Loo, 1767 The painting depicts the French polygraph Denis Diderot

A polygraph (from Ancient Greek: πολύς, poly = "many" and γράφειν, graphein = "to write") is an author who writes in a variety of fields.

In literature, the term polygraph is often applied to certain writers of antiquity such as Aristotle, Plutarch, Varro, Cicero and Pliny the Elder. Polygraphs still existed in the Middle Ages and Renaissance, but, other than writers of books for children, they have become rarer in modern times due to the specialisation of knowledge. Voltaire and Diderot are examples of modern polygraphs.

== Polygraph writers ==
=== Classical Antiquity ===
- Xenophon
- Philostratus of Lemnos
- Duris of Samos
- Suetonius
- Apuleius
- Apion

=== Middle Ages ===
- Abu Nuwas
- Isidore of Seville
- Jacob of Edessa
- Al-Jahiz
- Michael Psellos
- Bar-Hebraeus
- Piero Valeriano Bolzani

=== Early modern period (1500-1800) ===
- Carlo Amoretti
- Jean-François de Bastide
- Giuseppe Betussi
- Jacques Pierre Brissot
- Gatien de Courtilz de Sandras
- Johann Wolfgang von Goethe
- Ferdinand Hoefer
- Athanasius Kircher
- Pierre-Jean Le Corvaisier
- Pierre Louis Manuel
- Mathieu-François Pidansat de Mairobert
- Nicolas Edme Restif de La Bretonne
- César Vichard de Saint-Réal
- Francesco Sansovino
- Charles Sorel

=== Modern era (1800 onwards) ===
- August Strindberg
- Jean-Marie-Vincent Audin
- Arthur Conan Doyle
- Pierre Gévart
- Henry de Graffigny
- T. Proctor Hall
- Léon Halévy
- Vincent Labaume
- Paul Lacroix
- Gustave Le Rouge
- Simin Palay
- Christian Plume
- Claude Roy
- Ludwig Tieck
- Isaac Asimov
- Stephen Jay Gould

== Other usage ==
The term can be used in a pejorative sense to mean a journalist who writes on many subjects but without expertise in any particular one. The composer Georg Telemann was considered, somewhat pejoratively, a polygraph by critics due to the vast number and variety of his musical compositions.

== Notes ==
- This article incorporates text from French Wikipedia, Polygraphe (auteur).
