= Jean-Baptiste Germain =

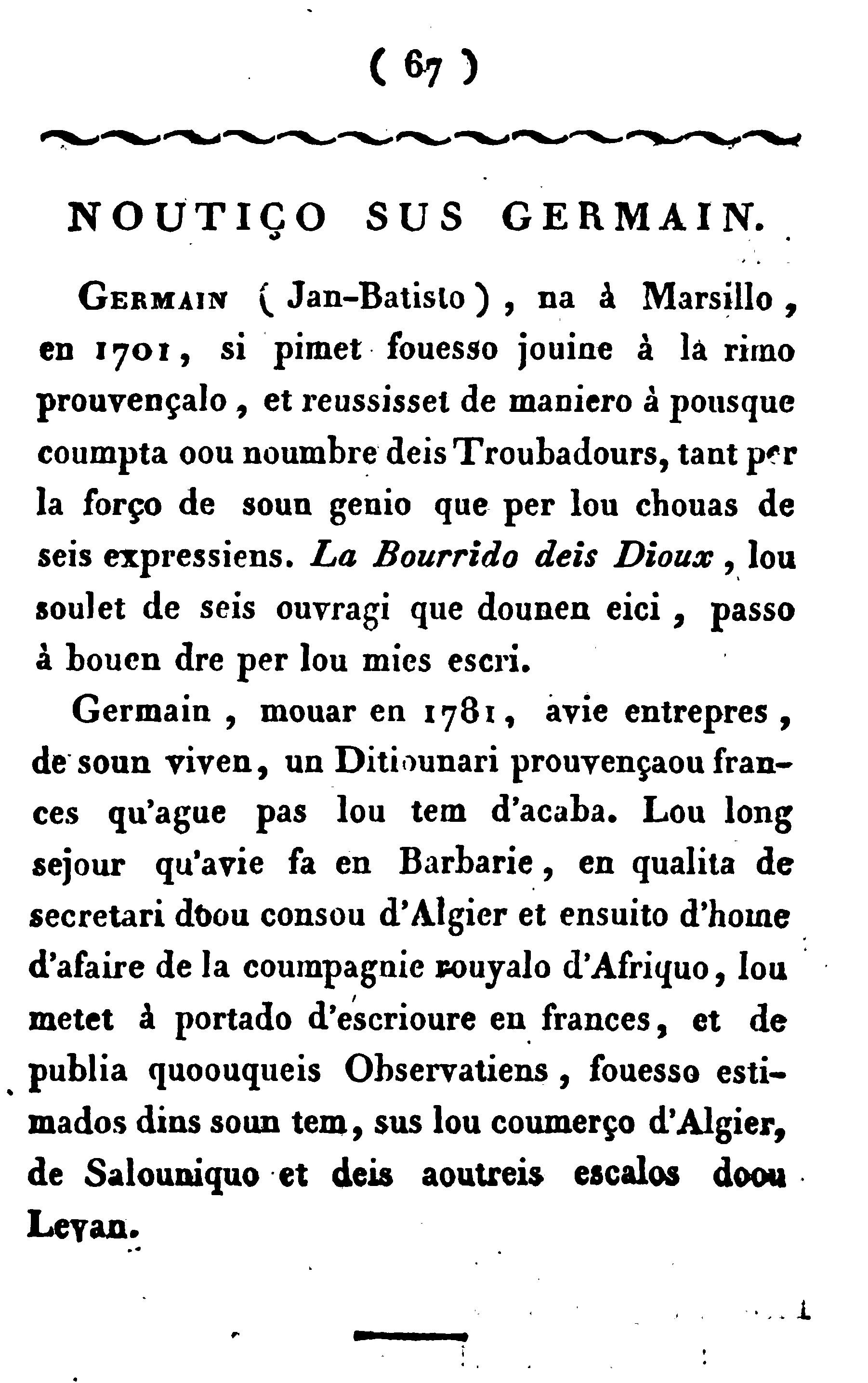
First page of Germain's biography in the Lo Boquet provençau

Jean-Baptiste Germain (Occitan: Joan Baptista Germain, IPA: [ʒuˈam bapˈtistɔ ʒeʀˈmen]; 1701 in Marseille – 1781 in Marseille) was an 18th-century Occitan writer from Provence. He was also a French diplomat in Algeria at the service of the Compagnie Royale d'Afrique.

His most famous work is La Bourrido deis Dieoux (La Borrida dei Dieus, in classical Occitan), published in 1760 and republished in 1820 in the anthology Lou Bouquet prouvençau (Lo Boquet provençau).

== Literary work ==
- La Borrida dei Dieus
- La Matrona d'Efeba
- La Barbariá d'un Anglés sus sa Mestressa
- Òda au Rei de Prussa
- Lo Trionfe de Marselha
- Lei Delicis dau Terrador
- Parafrasa dau Saume de Dàvid 108
- L'Apologia de la Borrida dei Dieu
