= Hippolyte Mireur =

French art market historian and physician

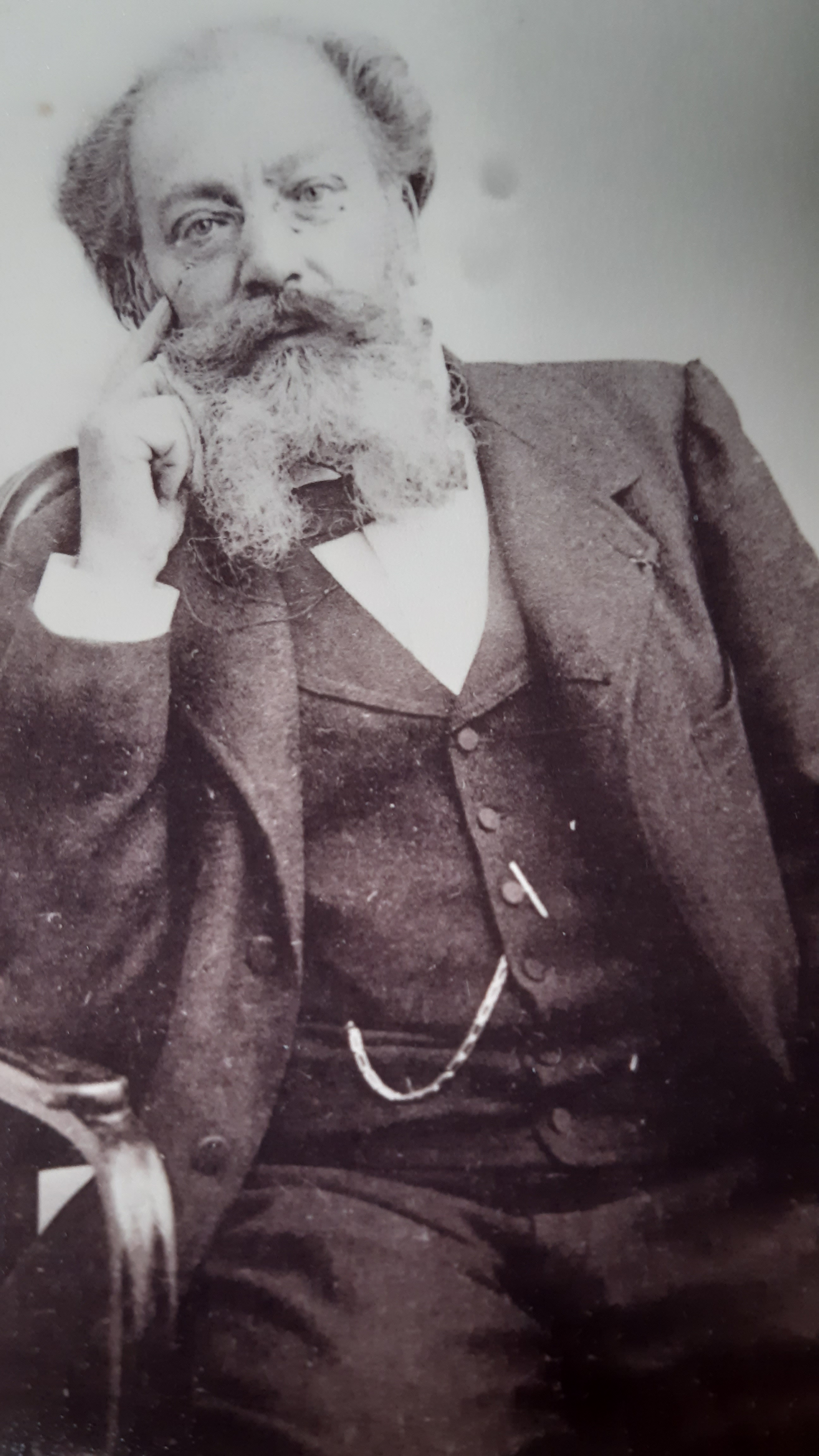
- Born: March 16, 1841; Fayence
- Died: February 13, 1914 (aged 72); Marseille
- Occupations: Art historian, Art collector, and physician

Hippolyte Mireur (March 16, 1841, Fayence – February 13, 1914, Marseille) was a French art historian and collector, physician and public figure. He published a Dictionary of art sales in France and Europe between 1700 and 1900, known among art market experts as the Mireur.

== Art market historian ==
With his Dictionary of art sales in France and Europe between 1700 and 1900 released between 1903 and 1911, Hippolyte Mireur made a significant contribution to the history of the art market. Considered to be the forerunner of art sales registers, the nearly 4000-page "Mireur", as it went on to be known among art markets specialists, offered data on the prices of artworks including sketches, watercolors, pastels, gouaches, miniatures, and etchings, and their successive owners. As it traced transactions of 3000 arts sales back over two centuries, providing the time and place of each purchase/sale and the vendor's name, Mireur's Dictionary still represents an important reference for art professionals. With 30 000 artists referenced in its seven volumes, and annotated catalogues and the prices of about 150 000 pieces, the "Mireur" anables historians and art dealers to establish a commercial history of the art.

With its breadth and wealth of descriptive details such as a painting's dimensions or a stamp's state of conservation, it also brings a precise knowledge of the early period of the emerging art market in Europe, including trends and collectors’ preferences, which Mireur presents in his introduction. The Dictionary has been used as a research tool and a source to certify the origins of artworks listed by Mireur, including for notable artists in world art history “at a time when their works did not carry today’s exceptional prestige when coming to the market.” The Dictionary includes a list of 120 transactions of Leonardo da Vinci's paintings, and many more for contemporaries like Camille Pissarro.

While it is unclear how many of the original 1911 print edition were published, in 2000 the online art market company Artprice acquired its copyrights and re-published the “Mireur”, celebrating it as “the missing link in the history of the art market between the 18th and 19th centuries and our 21st.”

In order to achieve his ambitious project, Hippolyte Mireur sold his own collection of paintings in 1900 at the Paris auction house Hotel Drouot. The proceeds of the sale amounting to 108 thousand French francs (about half a million euros of 2024) financed a small team of researchers to collect information and edit the seven volumes over the following ten years. Mireur's collection gathered a variety of contemporary, mostly French artists. In fact, Hippolyte Mireur undertook his titanic work at a time when the international supremacy of French artists and the French market was asserting itself, which reflected in the collection. While it included a few pieces from famous names like Greuze or Sisley, it mostly entailed works (nearly a hundred) of Adolphe Monticelli, a Marseille-born painter who spent most of life in Paris before returning south at the end of his life. Monticelli, "for whom there was an unaccountable enthusiasm in avant-garde circles at the time" for his use of colors, later received some national recognition. Most importantly from an art history perspective, Vincent Van Gogh considered him a major inspiration. Indeed, recognizing in Monticelli's work French master Delacroix's approach to the Midi [i.e. Provence], it is Monticelli's expressiveness and bright colors that decided Van Gogh to move to Provence to capture the region's distinct light that attracted so many among the major painters of the 19th and 20th centuries, from Monet to Picasso and from Marquet to Staël. To these and to many others Marseille and its region were quite familiar. Van Gogh, who in August 1888 wrote to his sister Wilhemina that he understood Monticelli "as if he was his son or brother", later went on to claim continuing his work, whose thick, dark-and-bright touches revealingly show in some of the Dutch-born's work, one may argue, before Vincent found his own way.

While Mireur's relatively eclectic collection reveals the curiosity of a learned amateur, in the dominant tradition of the hygienists of his time he was a staunch believer in the improvement of human condition and, unlike the more elitist art market shaping up at the time, the democratization of art. “As he worked on his Dictionary he meant to allow anyone to become an art collector as well by acquiring solid fundamentals and avoiding becoming the victim of the opacity of the market”, wrote art historian and sociologist Alain Quemin, who deems the Mireur “a proper scientific project” that “has strongly opened art history to rigorous quantitative techniques”. At about the same time as the Mireur, another similar work, the Dictionary of painters, sculptors, drawers and engravers of all times and all countries was published by art writer Emmanuel Bénézit. Soon after, in Paris Frits Lugt would undertake the publication of his inventory catalog of fine art sales, extending his earlier work on drawings and stamps collections.

== Physician and public leader ==
A scientist at heart, Hippolyte Mireur was by training a physician and the author of numerous medical works. A graduate of the Medical School of Paris in 1867, he settled in his hometown of Marseille, then a thriving hub of global maritime trade, to start as a practitioner. Until his death in 1914 he lived in a newly built Haussmann-style building on the Old Port, with his seven children and wife, the daughter of a wealthy local industrialist.

Known for its urban and architectural accomplishments in Paris, the then finishing Second Empire of Napoleon III had also been a fast-developing and innovation age for France's trade and industry, including on the Mediterranean. While Marseille had indeed become a major international port, expanding business on sealanes from the Far East to the Americas, social issues were tremendous, however. Poverty, housing, and public health were dismal for a large part of the population in a city-port conducive to the transmission of infections. A specialist of venereal diseases and a dermatologist, Mireur contributed considerably to public health and hygiene. He was particularly active in fighting the expansion of syphilis, overseeing prostitutes as a city official and providing free care to them and to the poorests. For his distinguished work during Marseille's fifth cholera epidemic in 1884–85, he received the Legion of Honor, France's highest distinction. A deputy Mayor in charge of public health between 1887 and 1892, he conducted and oversaw the creation of the city's sewage system, a critical step in improving public hygiene and containing the spread of infectious diseases. In 1892 Mireur was elected a member of the Academy of Arts and Sciences of Marseille.

His commitment to public health and scientific research entailed his early contribution to the local medical society. In 1889 he became the chair of France's National Medical Society. His many works on venereal diseases and demography, among which "Historical and practical study on prophylaxis and the treatment of cholera", and “Comparative study of populations movements in Marseille, France, and Europe", which highlights the role of draining, sewage, and public hygiene in containing mortality, won prizes and distinctions.

Hippolyte Mireur was also a precursor in the emerging medical insurance business, working as a physician with the insurance company The Union. As an art amateur his interest was also in music and in literature. Mireur translated plays by Sophocles into French verse, which he published in Paris and performed in the antique Roman theater of Frejus, near his Provence estate.
