= Édouard Crémieux =

French painter

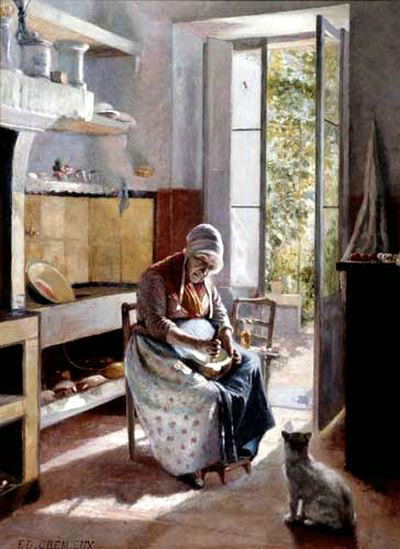
Making Aioli

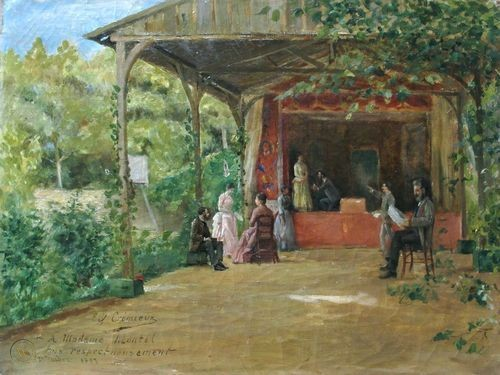
Actors (A Play in the Garden)

Édouard Salomon Crémieux (21 January 1856, Marseille – May 1944, Auschwitz) was a French painter of Jewish ancestry. He specialized in rural and coastal scenes.

== Biography ==
His father, Saul Appolon Crémieux (1826-1918) was a jeweler. He initially studied with Marius Guindon and Fernand Cormon at the École Nationale Supérieure des Beaux-Arts in Paris. Later, he worked with Tony Robert-Fleury. After that, he returned to Marseille.

He exhibited at the salon of the Association des Artistes Provençaux and at the Salon Rhodanien. In 1892, he was given honourable mention at the Paris Salon, followed by a third-class medal in 1897. For several years, he was Director of the Association des Artistes Marseillais.

He married Adrienne Sarah Ester Padova, who was fourteen years his junior, in 1894. They had three sons, two of whom became well known: Albert, a doctor, and Henri, a popular movie actor. Their third son, Gustave, died in 1925, when he was only twenty-two.

In April 1944 he, Adrienne and Albert were taken to the Drancy internment camp, then transferred to Auschwitz, where he was murdered on arrival. Adrienne followed shortly after. Possibly due to his profession, Albert survived.

His works may be seen at the Musée des Beaux-Arts de Marseille, Musée d'histoire de Marseille, Musée de la Castre, Musée d'Art de Toulon and the Musée Muséum départemental des Hautes-Alpes.
