= Cruoriella =

Scientific classification
- Clade: Archaeplastida
- Division: Rhodophyta
- Class: Florideophyceae
- Order: Peyssonneliales
- Family: Peyssonneliaceae
- Genus: Cruoriella; P.Crouan & H.Crouan, 1859

Species
- Cruoriella de-zwaanii (Weber-van Bosse) Denizot; Cruoriella elegans Nozawa; Cruoriella fissurata E.Y.Dawson; Cruoriella mexicana (E.Y.Dawson) Denizot

Genus of algae

Cruoriella is a genus of red algae in the family Peyssonneliaceae.

Namesbrought to synonymy

- Cruoriella armorica P.Crouan & H.Crouan (type), a synonym for Peyssonnelia armorica (P.Crouan & H.Crouan) Weber-van Bosse, 1916
