= Académie de Marseille =

French learned society based in Marseille

Coordinates: 43°17′50″N 5°23′7.11″E

Académie des sciences, lettres et arts de Marseille
- Founder: Louis XV
- Location: Marseille
- Region served: Bouches-du-Rhône
- Members: 40 members elected by their peers
- Official language: French
- Affiliations: Conférence nationale des académies des sciences, lettres et arts

The Académie de Marseille (English: Academy of Marseille), officially the Académie des sciences, lettres et arts de Marseille, is a French learned society based in Marseille. It was founded in 1726 and includes those in the city involved in the arts, letters, and sciences.

== History ==
The Académie de Marseille was created by letters patent of Louis XV in August 1726, which stated in particular that the number of members would be limited to twenty. The founding document furthermore stated that all twenty members must live in Marseille. However, the actual number of founding members was twenty-one, due to the insistence of Jean-Pierre Rigord that Henri de Belsunce also be offered membership. This was rectified in 1730 when Joseph-Félix de Gravier resigned from the Académie and was not replaced.

=== Founding Members ===
	Name	Profession
1	Antoine-Louis de Chalamont de la Visclède	Writer
2	Claude-Mathieu Olivier	Lawyer and poet
3	Jean-André Peyssonnel	Doctor and naturalist
4	Charles Peyssonnel	Lawyer
5	Paul Alexandre Dulard	Poet
6	Félix Cary	Numismatist and writer
7	Paul Augustin de Porrade	Scholar
8	Marc Antoine Taxil	Poet
9	Pierre de Robineau	Army commissioner
10	Jean-Baptiste Dupont (abbé)	Abbot
11	Jean Joseph de Gérin	Lieutenant general of the Admiralty
12	Joseph Félix de Gravier	Lawyer
13	Balthazar Eymar	Canon
14	Joseph Louis de Vaccon	Canon of the Marseille Cathedral
15	Thomas Le Fournier	Priest of Abbey of Saint Victor
16	Melchior de Croze	Priest of Abbey of Saint Victor
17	Charles Gaspard Guillaume Raffélis de Soissans	Priest of Abbey of Saint Victor
18	Jean-Baptiste Bertrand (doctor)	Doctor
19	Hector Léonard de Sainte-Colombe, Bailli de l'Aubépin	Chef d'escadre
20	Henri de Belsunce	Bishop of Marseille
21	Jean-Pierre Rigord	Delegate of the intendant of Provence

== Bibliography ==
- Dassy, Abbé (1877). L'académie de Marseille, ses origines, ses publications, ses archives, ses membres. Barlatier-Feissat.
