= French poetry =

Poetry written in French

French poetry (French: Poésie française) is a category of French literature. It may include Francophone poetry composed outside France and poetry written in other languages of France.

== French prosody and poetics ==
The modern French language does not have a significant stress accent (as English does) or long and short syllables (as Latin does). This means that the French metric line is generally not determined by the number of beats, but by the number of syllables (see syllabic verse; in the Renaissance, there was a brief attempt to develop a French poetics based on long and short syllables [see "musique mesurée"]). The most common metric lengths are the twelve-syllable line (the so-called "alexandrin"), the ten-syllable line (decasyllable) and the eight-syllable line (octosyllable).

In traditional French poetry, all permissible liaisons are made between words. Furthermore, unlike modern spoken French (at least in the north of France), a silent or mute 'e' counts as a syllable before a consonant and is pronounced, but is elided before a vowel (where "h aspiré" counts as a consonant). When it falls at the end of a line, the mute "e" is hypermetrical (outside the count of syllables). (For more on pronunciation of French, see French phonology).

The ten-syllable and 12-syllable lines are generally marked by a regular syntactical pause, called a "césure" (cesura):

- The ten-syllable line is often broken into syntactical groups as 5-5, 4-6, or 6-4.
- The alexandrine is broken into two six-syllable groups; each six-syllable group is called a "hémistiche".

In traditional poetry, the césure cannot occur between two words that are syntactically linked (such as a subject and its verb), nor can it occur after an unelided mute e. (For more on poetic meter, see Poetic meter.)

For example:

Je fais souvent ce rêve étrange et pénétrant
d'une femme inconnue et que j'aime et qui m'aime...

(Paul Verlaine, "Mon rêve familier", from Poèmes saturniens)

The verses are alexandrines (12 syllables). The mute e in "d'une" is pronounced and is counted in the syllables (whereas the mute e's at the end of "rêve", "étrange", "femme" and "j'aime"—which are followed by vowels—are elided and hypermetrical); the mute e at the end of "qui m'aime" is hypermetrical (this is a so-called "feminine rhyme"). No word occurs across the sixth to seventh syllable in both lines, thus creating the cesura.

The rules of classical French poetry (from the late 16th to the 18th century) also put forward the following:

- the encounter of two unelided and awkward vowel sounds ("hiatus") -- such as "il a à"—was to be avoided;
- the alternance of masculine and feminine rhymes (a feminine rhyme ends in a mute e) was mandated;
- rhymes based on words that rhymed, but that—in their spellings—had dissimilar endings (such as a plural in s or x and a singular word) were prohibited (this was the "rhyme for the eye" rule);
- a word could not be made to rhyme with itself;
- in general, "enjambement" (in which the syntax of a sentence does not finish at the end of a line, but continues on into the next verse) was to be avoided.

For more on rhymes in French poetry, see Rhyme in French.

Poetic forms developed by medieval French poets include:

- Ballade
- Rondeau (or Rondel)
- Ditié
- Dits moraux
- Blason
- Lai
- Virelai
- Pastourelle
- Complainte
- Chanson
  - Chanson de toile ("weaving song")
  - Chanson de croisade
  - Chanson courtoise
  - Rotrouenge
- Chant royal
- Aube ("dawn poem")
- Jeu parti

Other poetic forms found in French poetry:

- Villanelle
- Virelai nouveau
- Sonnet
- Bref double
- Ode

== History of French poetry ==
=== Medieval ===
As is the case in other literary traditions, poetry is the earliest French literature; the development of prose as a literary form was a late phenomenon (in the late Middle Ages, many of the romances and epics initially written in verse were converted into prose versions). In the medieval period, the choice of verse form was generally dictated by the genre: the Old French epics ("chanson de geste", like the anonymous Song of Roland, regarded by some as the national epic of France) were usually written in ten-syllable assonanced "laisses" (blocks of varying length of assonanced lines), while the chivalric romances ("roman", such as the tales of King Arthur written by Chrétien de Troyes) were usually written in octosyllabic rhymed couplets.

Medieval French lyric poetry was indebted to the poetic and cultural traditions in Southern France and Provence—including Toulouse, Poitiers, and the Aquitaine region—where "langue d'oc" was spoken (Occitan language); in their turn, the Provençal poets were greatly influenced by poetic traditions from the Hispano-Arab world. The Occitan or Provençal poets were called troubadours, from the word "trobar" (to find, to invent). Lyric poets in Old French are called "trouvères", using the Old French version of the word (for more information on the "trouvères", their poetic forms, extant works and their social status, see the article of that name). The occitan troubadours were amazingly creative in the development of verse forms and poetic genres, but their greatest impact on medieval literature was perhaps in their elaboration of complex code of love and service called "fin amors" or, more generally, courtly love. For more information on the troubadour tradition, see Provençal literature.

By the late 13th century, the poetic tradition in France had begun to develop in ways that differed significantly from the troubadour poets, both in content and in the use of certain fixed forms. The new poetic (as well as musical: some of the earliest medieval music has lyrics composed in Old French by the earliest composers known by name) tendencies are apparent in the Roman de Fauvel in 1310 and 1314, a satire on abuses in the medieval church filled with medieval motets, lais, rondeaux and other new secular forms of poetry and music (mostly anonymous, but with several pieces by Philippe de Vitry who would coin the expression Ars nova [new art, or new technique] to distinguish the new musical practice from the music of the immediately preceding age). The best-known poet and composer of ars nova secular music and chansons was Guillaume de Machaut. (For more on music, see medieval music; for more on music in the period after Machaux, see Renaissance music).

French poetry continued to evolve in the 15th century. Charles, Duke of Orléans was a noble and head of one of the most powerful families in France during the Hundred Years' War. Captured in the Battle of Agincourt, he was a prisoner of the English from 1415 to 1441 and his ballades often speak of loss and isolation. Christine de Pisan was one of the most prolific writers of her age; her "Cité des Dames" is considered a kind of "feminist manifesto". François Villon was a student and vagabond whose two poetic "testaments" or "wills" are celebrated for their portrayal of the urban and university environment of Paris and their scabrous wit, satire and verbal puns. The image of Villon as vagabond poet seems to have gained almost mythic status in the 16th century, and this figure would be championed by poetic rebels of the 19th century and 20th centuries (see Poète maudit).

=== Renaissance ===
Poetry in the first years of the 16th century is characterised by the elaborate sonorous and graphic experimentation and skillful word games of a number of Northern poets (such as Guillaume Cretin, Jean Lemaire de Belges and Jean Molinet), generally called "les Grands Rhétoriqueurs" who continued to develop poetic techniques from the previous century. Soon however, the impact of Petrarch (the sonnet cycle addressed to an idealised lover, the use of amorous paradoxes), Italian poets in the French court (like Luigi Alamanni), Italian Neo-platonism and humanism, and the rediscovery of certain Greek poets (such as Pindar and Anacreon) would profoundly modify the French tradition. In this respect, the French poets Clément Marot and Mellin de Saint-Gelais are transitional figures: they are credited with some of the first sonnets in French, but their poems continue to employ many of the traditional forms.

The new direction of poetry is fully apparent in the work of the humanist Jacques Peletier du Mans. In 1541, he published the first French translation of Horace's "Ars poetica" and in 1547 he published a collection of poems "Œuvres poétiques", which included translations from the first two cantos of Homer's Odyssey and the first book of Virgil's Georgics, twelve Petrarchian sonnets, three Horacian odes and a Martial-like epigram; this poetry collection also included the first published poems of Joachim Du Bellay and Pierre de Ronsard.

Around Ronsard, Du Bellay and Jean Antoine de Baïf there formed a group of radical young noble poets of the court (generally known today as La Pléiade, although use of this term is debated). The character of their literary program was given in Du Bellay's manifesto, the "Defense and Illustration of the French Language" (1549) which maintained that French (like the Tuscan of Petrarch and Dante) was a worthy language for literary expression and which promulgated a program of linguistic and literary production (including the imitation of Latin and Greek genres) and purification. For some of the members of the Pléiade, the act of the poetry itself was seen as a form of divine inspiration (see Pontus de Tyard for example), a possession by the muses akin to romantic passion, prophetic fervor or alcoholic delirium.

The forms that dominate the poetic production of the period are the Petrarchian sonnet cycle (developed around an amorous encounter or an idealized woman) and the Horace/Anacreon ode (especially of the "carpe diem" – life is short, seize the day – variety). Ronsard also tried early on to adapt the Pindaric ode into French. Throughout the period, the use of mythology is frequent, but so too is a depiction of the natural world (woods, rivers). Other genres include the paradoxical encomium (such as Remy Belleau's poem praising the oyster), the "blason" of the female body (a poetic description of a body part), and propagandistic verse.

Several poets of the period—Jean Antoine de Baïf (who founded an "Académie de Poésie et Musique" in 1570), Blaise de Vigenère and others—attempted to adapt into French the Latin, Greek or Hebrew poetic meters; these experiments were called "vers mesurés" and "prose mesuré" (for more, see the article "musique mesurée").

Although the royal court was the center of much of the century's poetry, Lyon – the second largest city in France in the Renaissance – also had its poets and humanists, most notably Maurice Scève, Louise Labé, Pernette du Guillet, Olivier de Magny and Pontus de Tyard. Scève's Délie, objet de plus haulte vertu – composed of 449 ten syllable ten line poems (dizains) and published with numerous engraved emblems – is exemplary in its use of amorous paradoxes and (often obscure) allegory to describe the suffering of a lover.

Poetry at the end of the century was profoundly marked by the civil wars: pessimism, dourness and a call for retreat from the world predominate (as in Jean de Sponde). However, the horrors of the war were also to inspire one Protestant poet, Agrippa d'Aubigné, to write a brilliant poem on the conflict:Les Tragiques.

=== Classical French poetry ===
Because of the new conception of "l'honnête homme" or "the honest or upright man", poetry became one of the principal modes of literary production of noble gentlemen and of non-noble professional writers in their patronage in the 17th century.

Poetry was used for all purposes. A great deal of 17th- and 18th-century poetry was "occasional", written to celebrate a particular event (a marriage, birth, military victory) or to solemnize a tragic occurrence (a death, military defeat), and this kind of poetry was frequent with gentlemen in the service of a noble or the king. Poetry was the chief form of 17th century theater: the vast majority of scripted plays were written in verse (see "Theater" below). Poetry was used in satires (Nicolas Boileau-Despréaux is famous for his "Satires" (1666)) and in epics (inspired by the Renaissance epic tradition and by Tasso) like Jean Chapelain's La Pucelle.

Although French poetry during the reign of Henri IV and Louis XIII was still largely inspired by the poets of the late Valois court, some of their excesses and poetic liberties found censure, especially in the work of François de Malherbe who criticized La Pléiade's and Philippe Desportes's irregularities of meter or form (the suppression of the cesura by a hiatus, sentences clauses spilling over into the next line "enjambement", neologisms constructed from Greek words, etc.). The later 17th century would see Malherbe as the grandfather of poetic classicism.

Poetry came to be a part of the social games in noble salons (see "salons" above), where epigrams, satirical verse, and poetic descriptions were all common (the most famous example is "La Guirlande de Julie" (1641) at the Hôtel de Rambouillet, a collection of floral poems written by the salon members for the birthday of the host's daughter). The linguistic aspects of the phenomenon associated with the "précieuses" (similar to Euphuism in England, Gongorism in Spain and Marinism in Italy) -- the use of highly metaphorical (sometimes obscure) language, the purification of socially unacceptable vocabulary—was tied to this poetic salon spirit and would have an enormous impact on French poetic and courtly language. Although "préciosité" was often mocked (especially in the later 1660s when the phenomenon had spread to the provinces) for its linguistic and romantic excesses (often linked to a misogynistic disdain for intellectual women), the French language and social manners of the 17th century were permanently changed by it.

From the 1660s, three poets stand out. Jean de La Fontaine gained enormous celebrity through his Aesop inspired "Fables" (1668–1693) which were written in an irregular verse form (different meter lengths are used in a poem). Jean Racine was seen as the greatest tragedy writer of his age. Finally, Nicolas Boileau-Despréaux became the theorizer of poetic classicism: his "Art poétique" (1674) praised reason and logic (Boileau elevated Malherbe as the first of the rational poets), believability, moral usefulness and moral correctness; it elevated tragedy and the poetic epic as the great genres and recommended imitation of the poets of antiquity.

"Classicism" in poetry would dominate until the pre-romantics and the French Revolution.

From a technical point of view, the poetic production from the late 17th century on increasingly relied on stanza forms incorporating rhymed couplets, and by the 18th century fixed-form poems – and, in particular, the sonnet – were largely avoided. The resulting versification – less constrained by meter and rhyme patterns than Renaissance poetry – more closely mirrored prose.

=== Nineteenth-century ===
French poetry from the first half of the century was dominated by Romanticism, associated with such authors as Victor Hugo, Alphonse de Lamartine, and Gérard de Nerval. The effect of the romantic movement would continue to be felt in the latter half of the century in wildly diverse literary developments, such as "realism", "symbolism", and the so-called fin de siècle "decadent" movement (see below). Victor Hugo was the outstanding genius of the Romantic School and its recognized leader. He was prolific alike in poetry, drama, and fiction. Other writers associated with the movement were the austere and pessimistic Alfred de Vigny, Théophile Gautier a devotee of beauty and creator of the "Art for art's sake" movement, and Alfred de Musset, who best exemplifies romantic melancholy.

By the middle of the century, an attempt to be objective was made in poetry by the group of writers known as the Parnassians—which included Leconte de Lisle, Théodore de Banville, Catulle Mendès, Sully-Prudhomme, François Coppée, José María de Heredia and (early in his career) Paul Verlaine—who (using Théophile Gautier's notion of art for art's sake and the pursuit of the beautiful) strove for exact and faultless workmanship, and selected exotic and classical subjects which they treated with a rigidity of form and an emotional detachment (elements of which echo the philosophical work of Arthur Schopenhauer whose aesthetic theories would also have an influence on the symbolists).

The naturalist tendency to see life in a more realistic way and focus on the more difficult aspects of life appears in an intensified degree in the influential poetry of Charles Baudelaire, but with strong romantic elements derived from the Byronic idea of the anti-hero and the romantic poet.

The poetry of Baudelaire and much of the literature in the latter half of the century (or "fin de siècle") were often characterized as "decadent" for their lurid content or moral vision. In a similar vein, Paul Verlaine used the expression "poète maudit" ("accursed poet") in 1884 to refer to a number of poets like Tristan Corbière, Stéphane Mallarmé and Arthur Rimbaud who had fought against poetic conventions and suffered social rebuke or had been ignored by the critics. But with the publication of Jean Moréas "Symbolist Manifesto" in 1886, it was the term symbolism which was most often applied to the new literary environment.

The writers Stéphane Mallarmé, Paul Verlaine, Paul Valéry, Joris-Karl Huysmans, Arthur Rimbaud, Jules Laforgue, Jean Moréas, Gustave Kahn, Albert Samain, Jean Lorrain, Remy de Gourmont, Pierre Louÿs, Tristan Corbière, Henri de Régnier, Villiers de l'Isle-Adam, Stuart Merrill, René Ghil, Saint-Pol Roux, Oscar-Vladislas de Milosz, the Belgians Albert Giraud, Emile Verhaeren, Georges Rodenbach and Maurice Maeterlinck and others have been called symbolists, although each author's personal literary project was unique.

From a technical point of view, the Romantics were responsible for a return to (and sometimes a modification of) many of the fixed-form poems used during the 15th and 16th centuries, as well as for the creation of new forms. The sonnet however was little used until the Parnassians brought it back into favor, and the sonnet would subsequently find its most significant practitioner in Charles Baudelaire. The traditional French sonnet form was however significantly modified by Baudelaire, who used 32 different forms of sonnet with non-traditional rhyme patterns to great effect in his Les Fleurs du mal.

=== Twentieth-century ===
Guillaume Apollinaire radicalized the Baudelairian poetic exploration of modern life in evoking planes, the Eiffel Tower and urban wastelands, and he brought poetry into contact with cubism through his "Calligrammes", a form of visual poetry. Inspired by Rimbaud, Paul Claudel used a form of free verse to explore his mystical conversion to Catholicism. Other poets from this period include: Paul Valéry, Max Jacob (a key member of the group around Apollinaire), Pierre Jean Jouve (a follower of Romain Rolland's "Unanism"), Valery Larbaud (a translator of Whitman and friend to Joyce), Victor Segalen (friend to Huysmans and Claudel), Léon-Paul Fargue (who studied with Stéphane Mallarmé and was close to Valéry and Larbaud).

The First World War generated even more radical tendencies. The Dada movement—which began in a café in Switzerland in 1916—came to Paris in 1920, but by 1924 the writers around Paul Éluard, André Breton, Louis Aragon and Robert Desnos—heavily influenced by Sigmund Freud's notion of the unconscious—had modified dada provocation into Surrealism. In writing and in the visual arts, and by using automatic writing, creative games (like the cadavre exquis) and altered states (through alcohol and narcotics), the surrealists tried to reveal the workings of the unconscious mind. The group championed previous writers they saw as radical (Arthur Rimbaud, the Comte de Lautréamont, Baudelaire) and promoted an anti-bourgeois philosophy (particularly with regards to sex and politics) which would later lead most of them to join the communist party. Other writers associated with surrealism include: Jean Cocteau, René Crevel, Jacques Prévert, Jules Supervielle, Benjamin Péret, Philippe Soupault, Pierre Reverdy, Antonin Artaud (who revolutionized theater), Henri Michaux and René Char. The surrealist movement would continue to be a major force in experimental writing and the international art world until the Second World War.

The effects of surrealism would later also be felt among authors who were not strictly speaking part of the movement, such as the poet Alexis Saint-Léger Léger (who wrote under the name Saint-John Perse), the poet Edmond Jabès (who came to France in 1956 when the Jewish population was expelled from his native Egypt) and Georges Bataille. The Swiss writer Blaise Cendrars was close to Apollinaire, Pierre Reverdy, Max Jacob and the artists Chagall and Léger, and his work has similarities with both surrealism and cubism.

Poetry in the post-war period followed a number of interlinked paths, most notably deriving from surrealism (such as with the early work of René Char), or from philosophical and phenomenological concerns stemming from Heidegger, Friedrich Hölderlin, existentialism, the relationship between poetry and the visual arts, and Stéphane Mallarmé's notions of the limits of language. Another important influence was the German poet Paul Celan. Poets concerned with these philosophical/language concerns—especially concentrated around the review L'Éphémère—include Yves Bonnefoy, André du Bouchet, Jacques Dupin, Roger Giroux and Philippe Jaccottet. Many of these ideas were also key to the works of Maurice Blanchot. The unique poetry of Francis Ponge exerted a strong influence on a variety of writers (both phenomenologists and those from the Tel Quel group). The later poets Claude Royet-Journoud, Anne-Marie Albiach, Emmanuel Hocquard, and to a degree Jean Daive, describe a shift from Heidegger to Ludwig Wittgenstein and a reevaluation of Mallarmé's notion of fiction and theatricality; these poets were also influenced by certain English-language modern poets (such as Ezra Pound, Louis Zukofsky, William Carlos Williams, and George Oppen) along with certain American postmodern and avant garde poets loosely grouped around the language poetry movement.

== Important French and Francophone poets ==
=== Middle Ages ===
(includes both trouvères and troubadours)

- Arnaut Daniel
- Bernart de Ventadorn
- Bertran de Born
- Folquet de Marselha (Foulques de Toulouse)
- Gautier d'Espinal
- Gui d'Ussel
- William IX, Duke of Aquitaine
- Guillem de Cabestany
- Guiraut de Bornelh
- Guiraut Riquier
- Jaufre Rudel
- Marcabru
- Peire Vidal
- Raimbaut de Vaqueiras
- Raimbaut of Orange
- Chrétien de Troyes (fl. 1160s-80s)
- Adenes Le Roi (c.1240–c.1300)
- Blondel de Nesle (fl c.1175–1210)
- Le Chastelain de Couci (fl c.1170–1203; †1203)
- Colin Muset (fl c.1230–60)
- Conon de Béthune (fl c.1180–c.1220; †1220)
- Gace Brulé (c.1159-after 1212)
- Gautier de Coincy (1177/8–1236)
- Guiot de Dijon (fl c.1200–30)
- Thibaut IV of Champagne (1201–53)
- Adam de la Halle (c.1240–88)
- Audefroi le Bastart (fl c1200–1230)
- Moniot d'Arras (fl c1250–75)
- Rutebeuf (d.1285)
- Guillaume de Machaut (1300–1377)
- Eustache Deschamps (1346-c.1406)
- Christine de Pisan (1364–1430)
- Charles, Duke of Orléans (1394–1465)
- François Villon (1431-1465?)

=== Sixteenth century ===
- Jean Lemaire de Belges
- Jean Molinet
- Clément Marot
- Maurice Scève
- Pernette Du Guillet
- Jacques Peletier du Mans
- Mellin de Saint-Gelais
- Joachim du Bellay
- Pierre de Ronsard
- Pontus de Tyard
- Jean-Antoine de Baïf
- Louise Labé
- Remy Belleau
- Étienne de La Boétie
- Philippe Desportes
- Étienne Jodelle
- Agrippa d'Aubigné
- Nicolas Rapin
- Guillaume de Salluste Du Bartas
- Jean de Sponde
- Frédéric Lamperouge
- Jean-Baptiste Chassignet
- Marc de Papillon

=== Seventeenth century ===
- François de Malherbe (1555–1628)
- Honoré d'Urfé (1567–1625)
- Jean Ogier de Gombaud (1570?-1666)
- Mathurin Régnier (1573–1613) – nephew of Philippe Desportes
- François de Maynard (1582–1646)
- Honorat de Bueil, seigneur de Racan (1589–1670)
- Théophile de Viau (1590–1626)
- François le Métel de Boisrobert (1592–1662)
- Antoine Gérard de Saint-Amant (1594–1661)
- Jean Chapelain (1595–1674)
- Vincent Voiture (1597–1648)
- Tristan L'Hermite (1601?-1655)
- Pierre Corneille (1606–1684)
- Paul Scarron (1610–1660)
- Isaac de Benserade (1613–1691)
- Georges de Brébeuf (1618–1661)
- Jean de La Fontaine (1621–1695)
- Nicolas Boileau-Despréaux (1636–1711)
- Jean Racine (1639–1699)
- Guillaume Amfrye de Chaulieu (1639–1720)
- Jean-François Regnard (1655–1709)

=== Eighteenth century ===
- André Chénier (1762–1794)
- Marie-Joseph de Chénier (1764–1811)

=== Nineteenth century ===
- Victor Hugo (1802–1885) is generally recognised as the greatest figure in French Romanticism in the 19th century.
- Alphonse de Lamartine
- Alfred de Vigny
- Alfred de Musset
- Gérard de Nerval (1808–1855)
- Théophile Gautier (1811–1872)
- Leconte de Lisle
- Théodore de Banville
- Catulle Mendès
- Sully-Prudhomme
- François Coppée
- José María de Heredia
- Antoinette Henriette Clémence Robert
- Charles Baudelaire (1821–1867) With Stéphane Mallarmé and Paul Verlaine, the founder of the Decadents. He also founded the journal Le Salut Public, translated Edgar Allan Poe, and was prosecuted along with the publisher and printer for blasphemy associated with Les Fleurs du mal. He held salons to encourage such painters as Delacroix. Among other poetic forms, he used the pantoum.
- Théodore Aubanel (1829–1882) Born into a publishing family (the museum for the publishing house still exists), he is the author of three collections of poetry written in the troubadour tradition, as well as three plays.
- Frédéric Mistral (1830–1914) Provençal language poet and Nobel Prize in Literature laureate in 1904. He created the Félibrige movement on May 21, 1854, with Théodore Aubanel, Jean Brunet, Anselme Mathieu, Paul Piera, his teacher Joseph Roumanille, and Alphonse Tavan. He was noted for his promotion of Provençal literature and founded the annual journal Armana Prouvençau. Also founder of a museum of ethnography in Arles.
- Stéphane Mallarmé (1842–1898) The originator of the Symbolist movement in France. His Un coup de dés jamais n'abolira le hasard was one of the first to use typography in poetry to create different trains of thought existing simultaneously.
- Paul Verlaine (1844–1896) Regarded in his day as the premier poet in France, he published, in addition to his poems, Les Poètes maudits, biographies of poets.
- Arthur Rimbaud (1854–1891) was one of the precursors of the Surrealist movement. He wrote many remarkable works, among The Sonnet of the Vowels in which each vowel is assigned a colour.
- Jules Laforgue
- Jean Moréas
- Gustave Kahn
- Albert Samain
- Tristan Corbière
- Henri de Régnier
- René Ghil
- Saint-Pol Roux
- Oscar-Vladislas de Milosz
- Albert Giraud
- Émile Verhaeren
- Georges Rodenbach
- Tristan Klingsor (1874–1966)
- Maurice Maeterlinck

=== Twentieth century ===
- Paul Valéry (1871–1945)
- Paul Claudel – used a form of free verse to explore his mystical conversion to Catholicism.
- Guillaume Apollinaire's (1880–1918) first collection of poetry was L'enchanteur pourrissant (1909), but it was Alcools (1913) which established his reputation. These poems, influenced in part by the symbolists, juxtapose the old and the new, using traditional forms and modern imagery.
- Max Jacob (a key member of the group around Apollinaire)
- Pierre Jean Jouve – a follower of Romain Rolland's "Unanism")
- Valery Larbaud – a translator of Whitman and friend to Joyce
- Victor Segalen – friend to Huysmans and Claudel
- Léon-Paul Fargue
- Paul Éluard was a leading exponent of Surrealism.
- André Breton
- Louis Aragon
- Georges Brassens
- Georges Dumitresco
- Robert Desnos
- Jacques Prévert's works move between Surrealism and the popular songs of Parisian café culture.
- Jean Cocteau
- Jules Supervielle
- Benjamin Péret
- Philippe Soupault
- Pierre Reverdy
- Henri Michaux
- René Char
- Saint-John Perse
- Edmond Jabès
- Yves Bonnefoy
- André du Bouchet
- Jacques Dupin
- Roger Giroux
- Boris Vian
- Philippe Jaccottet
- Francis Ponge
- Claude Royet-Journoud
- Anne-Marie Albiach
- Emmanuel Hocquard
- Seyhan Kurt
- Jean Daive
- Dominique Sorrente
- Jean Baudrillard

== See also ==
- List of French-language poets (alphabetical)
- Parnassianism
