= Château de Font-Ségugne =

Château in Provence-Alpes-Côte d'Azur, France

Coordinates: 43.9333°N 4.9416°E

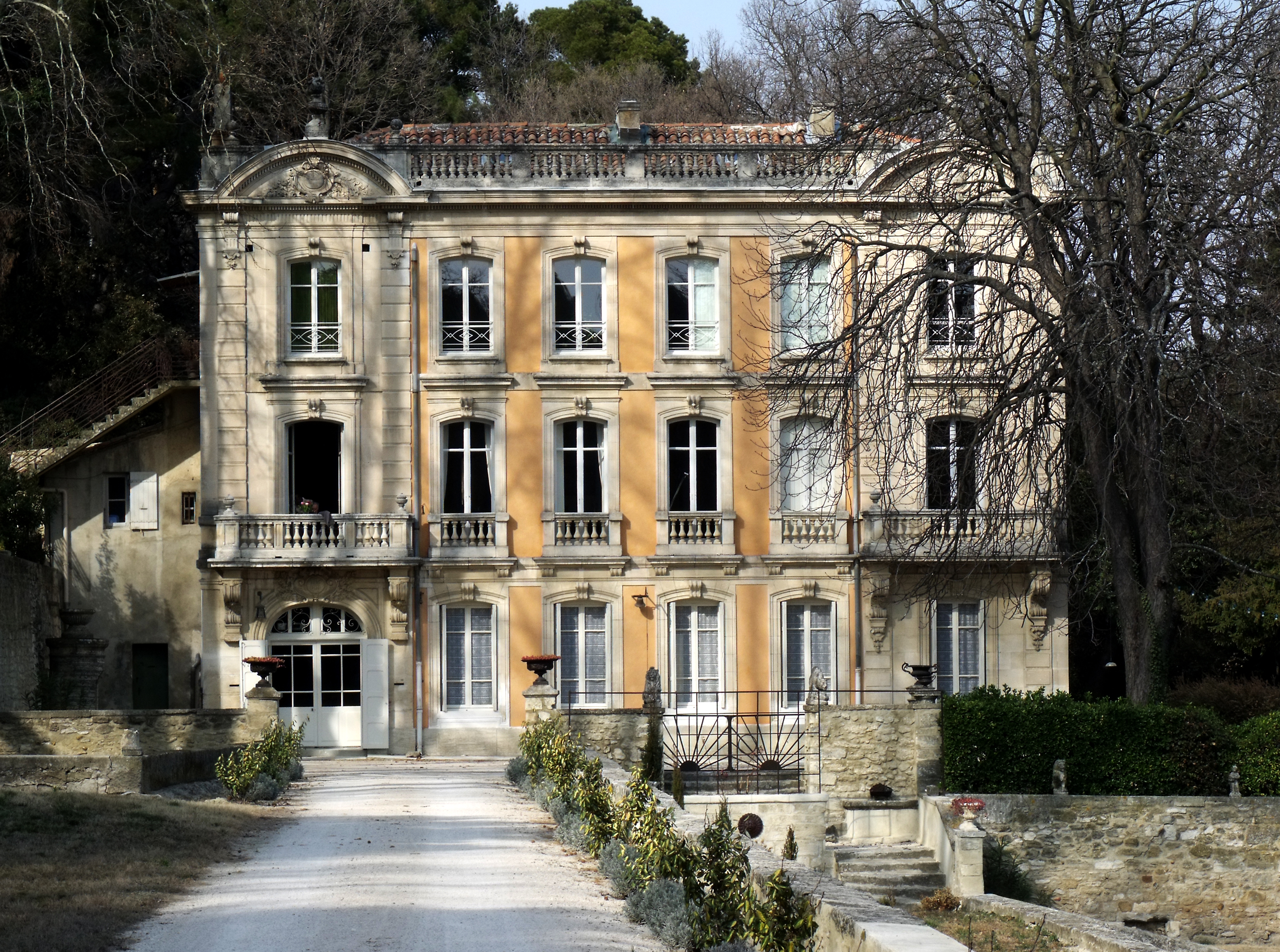
The Château de Font-Ségugne in 2012

The Château de Font-Ségugne is a historic château built at Font-Ségugne in Châteauneuf-de-Gadagne, Provence, France. It is the location of a former bastide built in the 15th century for a Roman Catholic cardinal. It was the birthplace of the Félibrige in the 1850s. Nowadays, it is a winery.

== Location ==
It is located on the Cancabèu (Campbeau) plateau in Châteauneuf-de-Gadagne, Provence, Southern France.

== History ==
=== 15th-century house ===
In the 15th century, a bastide was built for an Italian Roman Catholic cardinal.

It later belonged to the Dukes of Gadagne.

=== Birthplace of the Félibrige ===
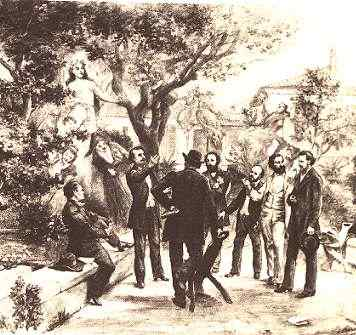
The birth of Félibrige.

The bastide belonged to Marie-Pierre d'Alcantara Goujon (1770–1840), a wealthy philanthropist who served as the mayor of Châteauneuf-de-Gadagne from 1813 to 1816. He had no children and bequeathed it to the Giéra family in the 19th century.

On 21 May 1854, Paul Giéra formed the Félibrige movement with fellow poets Frédéric Mistral, Joseph Roumanille, Théodore Aubanel, Jean Brunet, Anselme Mathieu and Alphonse Tavan here.

=== Château ===
The château was built in 1860.

== Wine ==
The estate produces wine.
