= Paul Giéra =

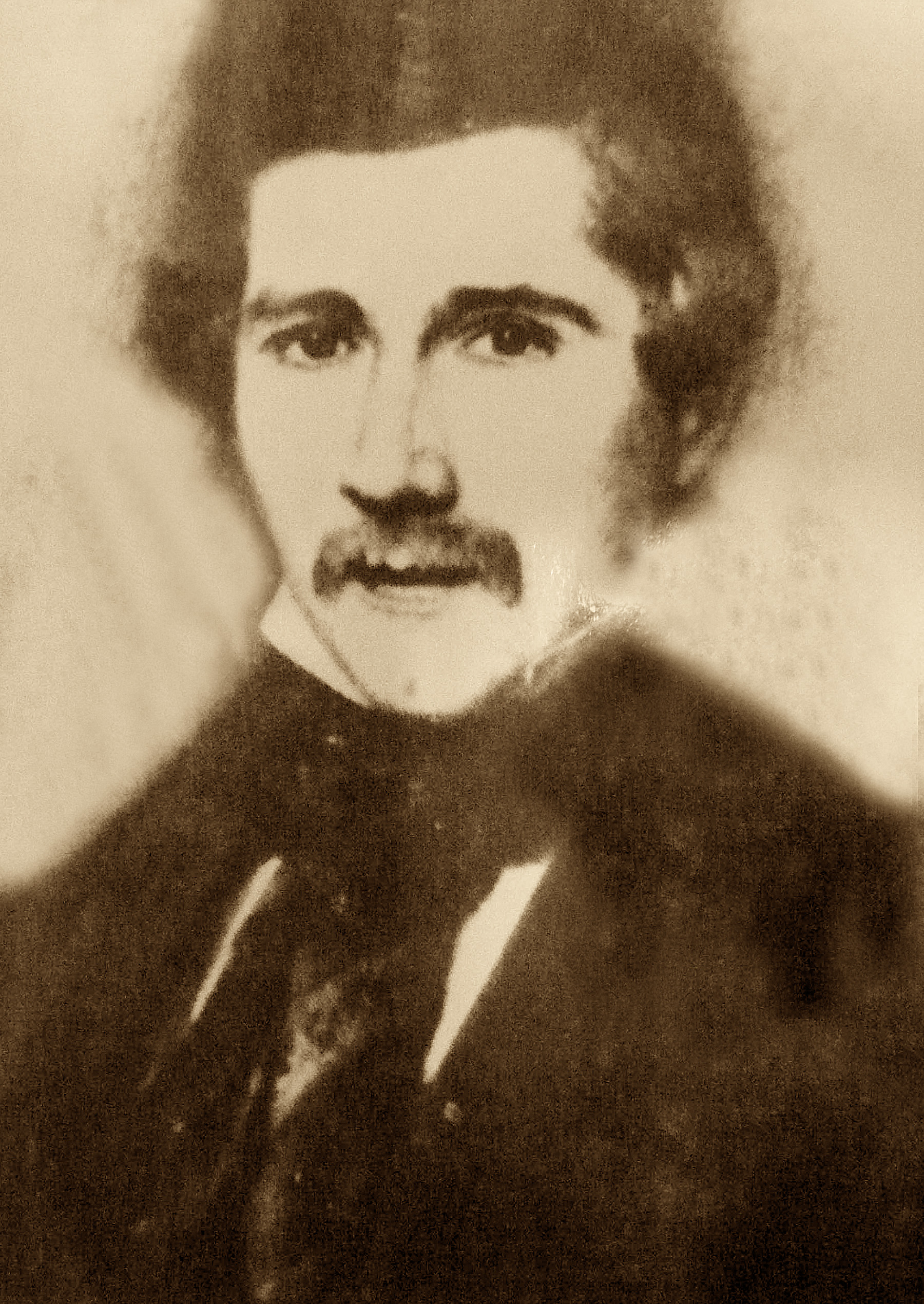
- Paul Giéra in 1854
- Born: 22 January 1816; Avignon, Vaucluse, Provence-Alpes-Côte d'Azur, France
- Died: 26 April 1861 (aged 45); Avignon, Vaucluse, Provence-Alpes-Côte d'Azur, France
- Occupation: Poet

Paul Giéra (22 January 1816 – 26 April 1861) was a French Provençal poet.

== Early life ==
Paul Giéra was born on 22 January 1816 in Avignon. His father was Jean Baptiste Joseph Giéra and his mother, Marie Madeleine Marguerite Crillon.

== Career ==
Giéra was the owner of the Château de Font-Ségugne in Châteauneuf-de-Gadagne.

On 21 May 1854, he invited Joseph Roumanille, Frédéric Mistral, Théodore Aubanel, Alphonse Tavan, Jean Brunet and Anselme Mathieu, where they founded the Félibrige movement.

== Death ==
He died on 26 April 1861 in his hometown of Avignon.

== Legacy ==
The Collège Paul Giéra in Avignon was named in his honour. It closed down in 2009 due to lack of public funding.

The Gymnase Paul Giéra in Avignon was also named in his honour.
