= Albèrt Arnavièlha =

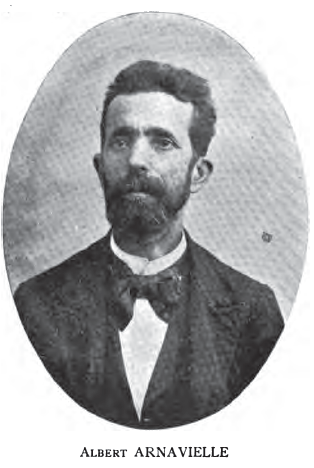
Albert Arnavielle

Albèrt Arnavièlha (Albert Arnavielle in French) was an Occitan poet and journalist born in Alès on 22 July 1844. He died in Montpellier on 11 November 1927. He wrote both in French and Occitan and was a majoral of Frederic Mistral's Felibritge. He also was a royalist militant for Action française and a close friend of Charles Maurras's.

== Main works ==
- Lous Cants de l'aubo ("Morning Songs"), Nîmes, J. Roumieux, 1868.
- Per Toulouso, au noum de Diéu ("For Toulouse, in God's name"), Alès, J. Martin, 1875.
- Lous Gorbs ("The Baskets"), Montpellier, Hamelin et frères, 1880.
- Pouẽsìos dau troubaire-massou Matiéu Lacroix ("Poems by the Troubadour and masseur named Matthieu Lacroix"), La Grand-Combe, D. Coronel, 1899.
- Las Raiolos ("The Raviolis"), Montpellier, Éditions Languedociennes, 1932.
