= Félix Gras =

French writer and poet (1844–1901)

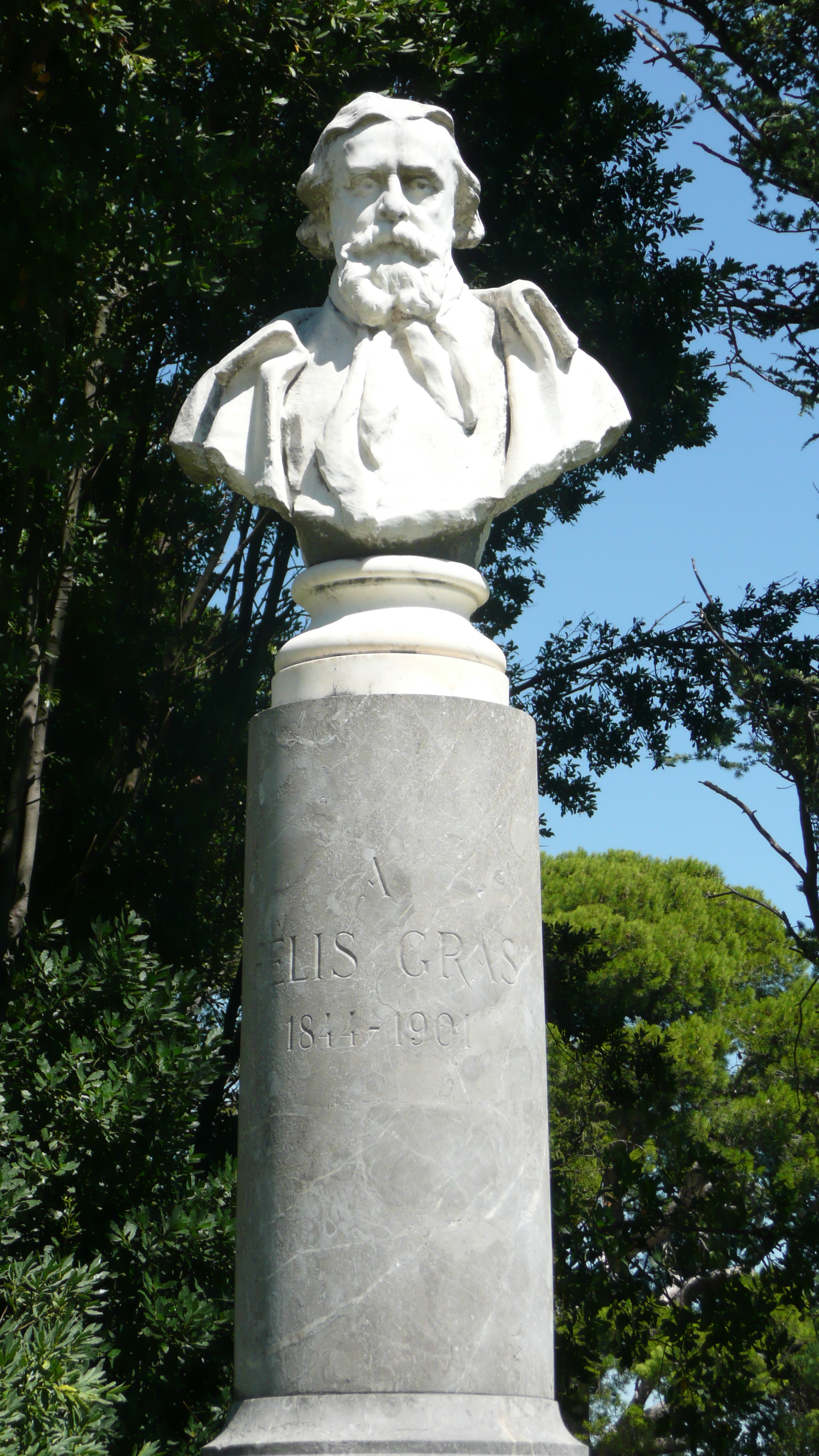
- Felix Gras statue in Avignon
- Born: May 3, 1844; Malemort-du-Comtat, France
- Died: March 4, 1901 (aged 56); Avignon, France
- Occupation: Notary
- Known for: Writing

Félix Gras (Occitan: Fèlix Gras, IPA: [ˈfɛlis ɡɾas]; Malemort-du-Comtat, May 3, 1844 – Avignon, March 4, 1901) was a Provençal poet and novelist.

== Biography ==
Gras was born into a farming family and went to secondary school at the college of Sainte Garde, in Saint Didier. He studied law as a clerk to the notary Jules Giéia in Avignon, later becoming a notary himself, but also enthusiastically attended poetry meetings where he read his first poems.

Soon abandoning his law training, Gras published Lei Carbonièrs (The Charcoal Burners), a rustic epic poem in twelve cantos, in 1876, noted for its "elemental passion" and scenic descriptions, for which he gained immediate recognition. In 1879, he married the niece of Joseph Roumanille, the husband of his sister Rose Anaïs. His next work, Tolosa, an epic poem about the invasion of the Albigenses by Simon de Montfort, came in 1882, to further acclaim. He produced a volume of short poems, Lei Romancèras Provençals, in 1887, followed by a collection of prose stories, La Papalina, in 1891.

In 1891, succeeding Joseph Roumanille, Gras was elected as the third president of the Félibrige, a literary and cultural association founded by Frédéric Mistral (its first president) and other Provençal writers to defend and promote Provençal Occitan and Provençal literature. He held this post until his death.

Gras achieved popular success in 1896 with the novel Lei Roge dau Miègjorn, which was translated into French as Les Rouges du Midi ("the Reds of the Midi"). It was praised by former British prime minister William Gladstone, and was subsequently published in several other languages. He then wrote two more tales dealing with the late period of the French Revolution: La Terror ("The Terror") and La Terror Blanca ("The White Terror"), the latter of which features Napoleon as a character).

The epitaph on his tomb, in his native town of Malemort, reads:

Amo moun village maï que toun village, amo ma Provenço maï que ta province, amo la Franço maï que tout! (Note: "Aimo mon vilatge mai que ton vilatge, aimo ma Provença mai que ta province, aimo la França mai que tot!" in standard Occitan orthography.) (Note: The word province is written in French here – the standard Occitan term is província.)

"I love my village more than your village, I love my Provence more than your province, I love France more than anything!"
