= José Mange =

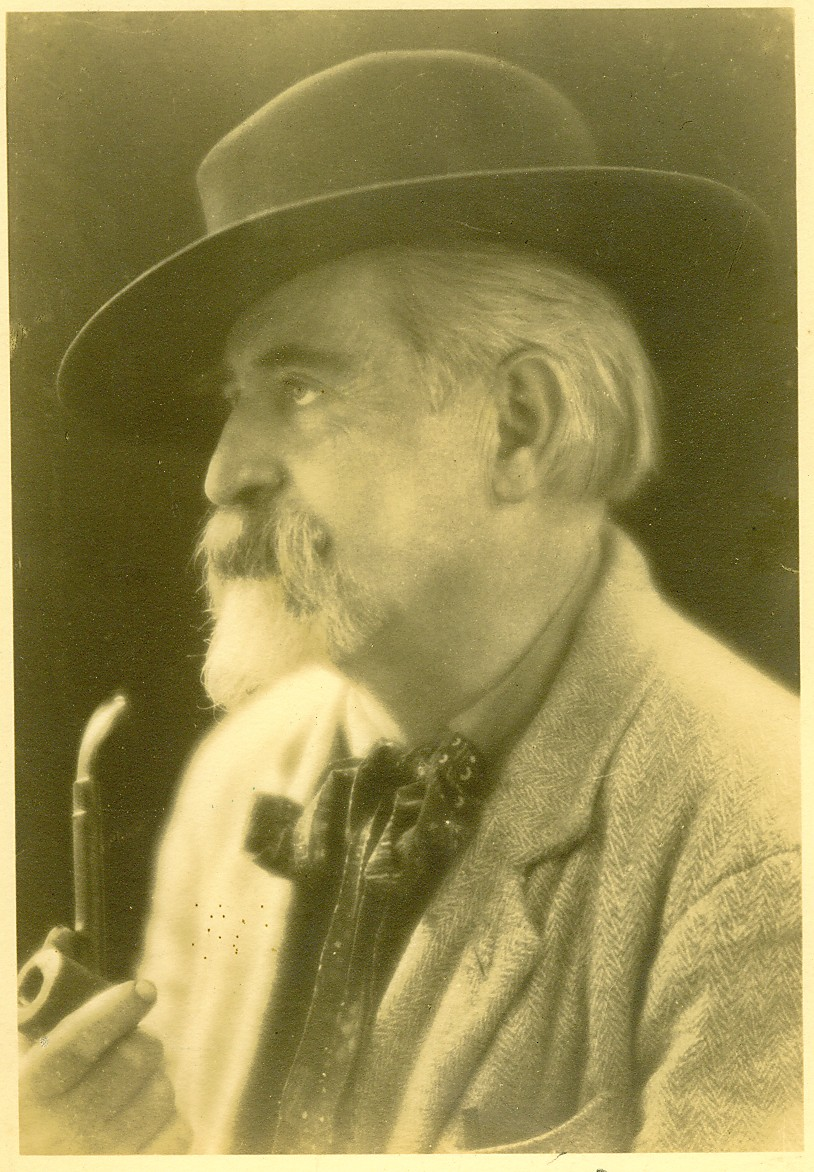
José Mange (date unknown)

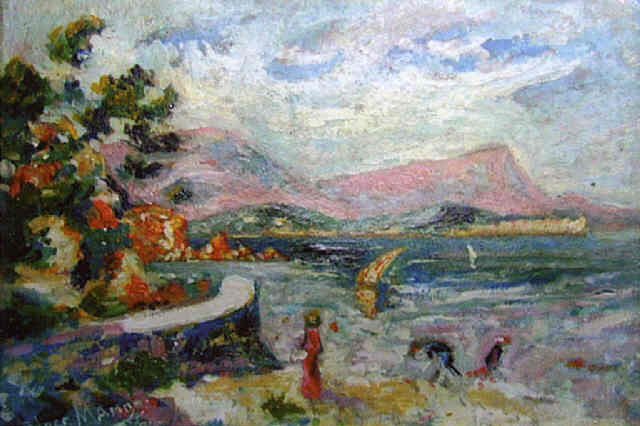
The Seaside at Toulon

Joseph Julien Casimir Mange, known as José Mange (10 October 1866, Toulon – 7 January 1935, Toulon) was a French Impressionist landscape painter and Occitan poet who was a member of the Félibrige.

== Biography ==
From 1876 to 1886, he was a student at the Catholic College of Aix-en-Provence, where he met Paul Cézanne during a visit to the Musée Granet and decided to take up art. Accordingly, he moved to Paris, taking lessons from Jean-Paul Laurens and Benjamin-Constant. While there, he met with old friends from College at the Café Procope and their mutual admiration for Frédéric Mistral led him to join the Parisian branch of the Félibrige. In 1892, together with Charles Maurras, he founded the "Escolo Parisienco", devoted to assisting young people from Occitania who had left their families to seek fame and fortune in Paris. The following year, he had his first showing at the "Salon des Indépendants" and, in 1894, set up his first small studio with a friend.

In 1900, after a successful show at the Salon d'automne, he returned to Toulon, but continued to participate in exhibitions in Paris. In 1902, at the first "Salon des Amis des Arts", he withdrew his works in protest over the poor display that was given to his old mentor Cézanne.

In 1905, his parents bought him an old photography shop for use as a studio. By 1917, now married, he was able to move into larger quarters and, three years later, had become successful enough to lease two workshops. In 1926, he made an extended visit to Serres in Hautes-Alpes, where he produced a popular series of watercolors. In 1929, he briefly returned to Paris to do some cityscapes.

During the last years of his life, he struck up a friendship with Georges Bernanos and they dedicated several books to one another.

== Writings ==
- Choix de Poèmes José Mange, Ed. Facettes 1935 (introduction by the poet Léon Vérane)
