= Copa Santa =

Song

La Coupo Santo (The Holy Cup), in full La Cansoun de la Coupo (The song of the Cup) in original modern (or Mistralian) norm Provençal (in classical norm, La Copa Santa in full Lo Cant de la Copa Santa (The song of the Holy Cup) or La Cançon de la Copa (The Song of the Cup)) is considered the anthem of the Félibrige. It is sung in Provençal, one of six Occitan dialects.

It refers to a silver chalice the Catalan félibres offered their Provençal counterparts on July 30, 1867 during a Banquet held in Avignon to thank them for hiding Victor Balaguer, a poet from Barcelona who'd sought political asylum out of Spain. The cup was made by Guillaume Fulconis and the silversmith Jarry.

The cup is traditionally entrusted to the capoulié, who presides over the Félibrige. It is showcased every year at the society's annual congress, called la Santa Estèla. The banquet is officially closed when the Copa Santa has been sung. It was initially written by Frédéric Mistral to commemorate the fraternal bond that unites the Occitan and Catalan nations, and the music was taken from a Christmas carol from Friar Serapion: Guilhaume, Tòni, Pèire. It stands among the best-known anthems of Occitania alongside Se Canta and De cap tà l'immortèla. The audience is supposed to stand up for the last verse.

== Description ==
Frédéric Mistral described the cup with these words in L'Armana prouvençau:

It is a cup of antique shape, supported by a palm tree. Against the palm tree, standing up and facing each other, two gentle figurines that depict Catalonia and Provence as sisters.
Provence wraps its right arm around her friend's neck, as a token of amity; Catalonia holds her right hand on her heart and seems to be thanking her.
At the bottom of each figurine, dressed in the Latin manner and with their breasts naked, lie their respective coat of arms in an escutcheon.
Around the cup and outside it, written on a braid intertwined with laurels, the following words can be read (in Catalan):

"Souvenir offered by the Catalan Patricians to the Provençal Félibres for the hospitality given to the Catalan poet Victor Balaguer, 1867."

And on the pedestal these other finely engraved inscriptions can be found:

"They say it is dead,
But to me, it's still alive.
V. Balaguer
Ah! if only they could hear me!
Ah! if only they would follow me!
F. Mistral"

== Lyrics ==
In Mistralian norm Provençal:

Prouvençau, veici la Coupo
Que nous vèn di Catalan
A-de-rèng beguen en troupo
Lou vin pur de nostre plan

Chorus
Coupo Santo
E versanto
Vuejo à plen bord,
Vuejo abord
Lis estrambord
E l'enavans di fort!

D'un vièi pople fièr e libre
Sian bessai la finicioun;
E, se toumbon li felibre,
Toumbara nosto nacioun

D'uno raço que regreio
Sian bessai li proumié gréu;
Sian bessai de la patrìo
Li cepoun emai li priéu.

Vuejo-nous lis esperanço
E li raive dóu jouvènt,
Dóu passat la remembranço,
E la fe dins l'an que vèn,

Vuejo-nous la couneissènço
Dóu Verai emai dóu Bèu,
E lis àuti jouïssènço
Que se trufon dóu toumbèu

Vuejo-nous la Pouësìo
Pèr canta tout ço que viéu,
Car es elo l'ambrousìo,
Que tremudo l'ome en diéu

Pèr la glòri dóu terraire
Vautre enfin que sias counsènt.
Catalan, de liuen, o fraire,
Coumunien tóutis ensèn!

In classical norm Provençal:

Provençaus, vaicí la copa
Que nos ven dei Catalans
A de rèng beguem en tropa
Lo vin pur de nòstre plant

Chorus
Copa santa
E versanta
Vueja a plen bòrd
Vueja abòrd
Leis estrambòrds
E l'enavans dei fòrts

D'un vièlh pòble fièr e liure
Siam bensai la finicion
E se tomban lei felibres
Tombarà nòstra nacion

D'una raça que regrelha
Siam bensai lei promiers greus
Siam bensai de la patria
Lei cepons e mai lei prieus

Vueja-nos leis esperanças
E lei raives dau jovent
Dau passat la remembrança
E la fe dins l'an que ven

Vueja-nos la coneissença
Dau verai e mai dau bèu
E leis autei joïssenças
Que se trufan dau tombèu

Vueja-nos la Poesia
Pèr cantar tot çò que viu
Car es ela l'ambrosia
Que tremuda l'òme en dieu

Pèr la glòria dau terraire
Vautres enfin que siatz consents
Catalans de luenh, ò fraires
Comuniem toteis ensems

In French:

Provençaux, voici la coupe
Qui nous vient des Catalans.
Tour à tour buvons ensemble
Le vin pur de notre cru.

Chorus
Coupe sainte
Et débordante
Verse à pleins bords,
Verse à flots
Les enthousiasmes
Et l'énergie des forts!

D'un ancien peuple fier et libre
Nous sommes peut-être la fin;
Et, si tombent les félibres,
Tombera notre nation.

D'une race qui regerme
Peut-être sommes-nous les premiers jets;
De la patrie, peut-être, nous sommes
Les piliers et les chefs.

Verse nous les espérances
Et les rêves de la jeunesse,
Le souvenir du passé
Et la foi dans l'an qui vient.

Verse-nous la connaissance
Du Vrai comme du Beau,
Et les hautes jouissances
Qui se rient de la tombe.

Verse-nous la Poésie
Pour chanter tout ce qui vit,
Car c'est elle l'ambroisie
Qui transforme l'homme en Dieu.

Pour la gloire du pays
Vous enfin qui êtes consentants nos alliés,
Catalans, de loin, oh frères,
Tous ensemble communions!

In English:

Provençal people, this is the cup
That the Catalans gave us
Let us drink in turn
The wine from our wineyards

Chorus
Holy cup
And overflowing
May you pour abundantly
May you pour in streams
The enthusiasm
And the energy of the strong

Of an old and proud people
We may be the very last
And should the félibres fall
So will our nation fall

Of a race germinating again
We may be the first shoots
We may be of our motherland
The pillars and the leaders

May you pour us the hopes
And the dreams of the youth
Of the past the memories
And the faith in next year

May you pour us the knowledge
Of truth and beauty
And the other pleasures
That defy the tomb

May you pour us the poetry
To sing all that lives
For this is the ambrosia
That turns man into a god

For the glory of the land
You our allies at last
Catalans from afar, o brothers
Let us receive communion together

Notice: For both norms of Provençal orthography, pronunciation is almost the same.

== Wikisource ==
- Copa Santa
