= Anselme Mathieu =

French poet (1828–1895)

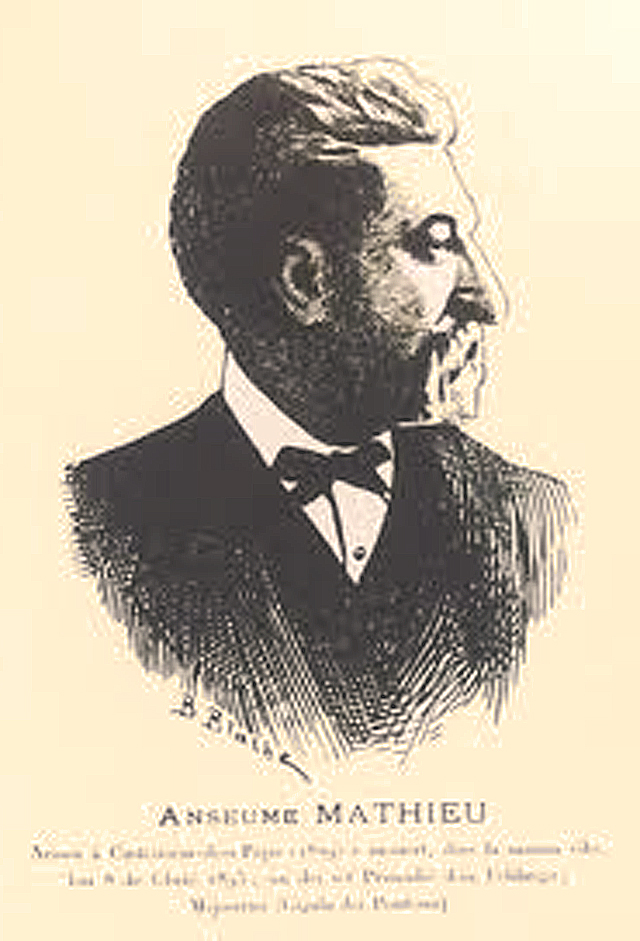
- Born: 21 April 1828; Châteauneuf-du-Pape, Vaucluse, Provence-Alpes-Côte d'Azur, France
- Died: 8 February 1895 (aged 66)
- Occupation: Poet

Anselme Mathieu (21 April 1828 – 8 February 1895) was a French Provençal poet.

== Early life ==
Anselme Mathieu was born 21 April 1828 in Châteauneuf-du-Pape. His parents were the fourth-generation owners of the Domaine Mathieu, a vineyard still in operation today.

== Poetry ==
Mathieu was a Provençal poet. He published poems in Armana prouvençau under the pseudonym of Félibre di Poutoun.

On 21 May 1854, he co-founded the Félibrige movement with Joseph Roumanille, Frédéric Mistral, Théodore Aubanel, Jean Brunet, Paul Giéra and Alphonse Tavan.

He published La Farandole, a collection of poems, in 1862. Mistral contributed the foreword.

== Wine ==
Mathieu introduced the co-founders of the Félibrige to the red wine produced by his family vineyard. Moreover, he introduced it to Alphonse Daudet, another writer from Provence, who called it, "royal, imperial, pontifical."

Additionally, Mathieu introduced Alexandre Dumas and Alphonse de Lamartine, two writers from Paris, to this wine.

== Death ==
He died on 8 February 1895.

== Legacy ==
- The Collège Anselme Mathieu, a secondary school in Avignon, is named in his honour.
