= Jean Brunet =

French Provençal poet

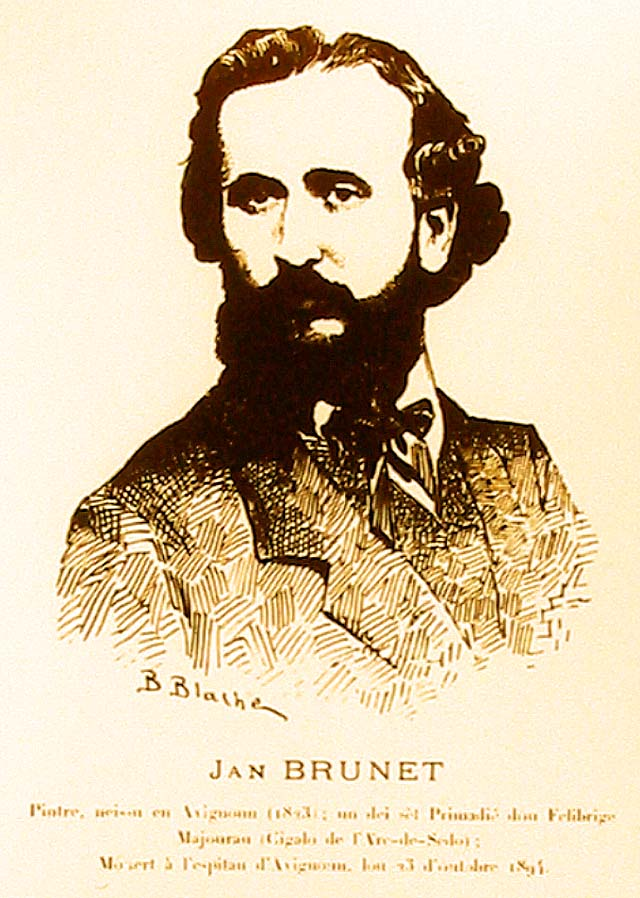
- Born: 27 December 1822; Avignon, Vaucluse, Provence-Alpes-Côte d'Azur, France
- Died: 24 October 1894 (aged 71); Avignon, Vaucluse, Provence-Alpes-Côte d'Azur, France
- Occupation: Poet
- Spouse: Cécile Brunet

Jean Brunet (French: [ʒɑ̃ bʁynɛ]; 27 December 1822 – 23 October 1894) was a French Provençal poet.

== Early life ==
Brunet was born on 27 December 1822 in Avignon, in Provence, France.

== Career ==
On 21 May 1854, he co-founded the Félibrige movement with Joseph Roumanille, Frédéric Mistral, Théodore Aubanel, Alphonse Tavan, Paul Giéra and Anselme Mathieu.

He published collections of poems and sayings in Provençal. His first poems were published in the French literary journal entitled Musée des familles in 1867.

== Personal life ==
He was married to Cécile Brunet. Stéphane Mallarmé, who was friends with the Brunets, wrote a poem entitled Sainte about her.

== Death ==
He died on 23 October 1894 in Avignon.
