= Alphonse Tavan =

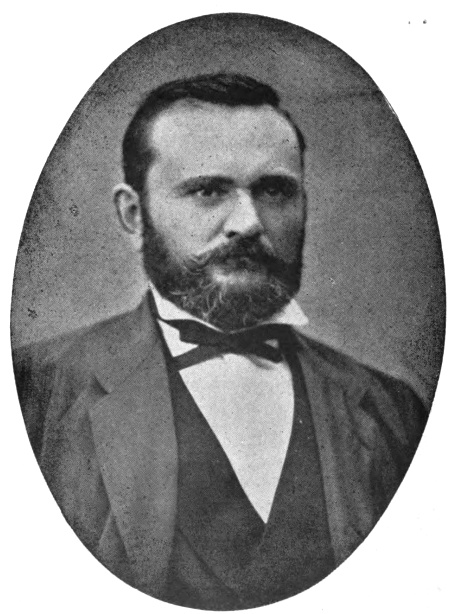
- Alphonse Tavan in 1897
- Born: 9 March 1833; Châteauneuf-de-Gadagne, Vaucluse, Provence-Alpes-Côte d'Azur, France
- Died: 12 May 1905 (aged 72); Châteauneuf-de-Gadagne, Vaucluse, Provence-Alpes-Côte d'Azur, France
- Occupation: Poet

Alphonse Tavan (9 March 1833 – 12 May 1905) was a French Provençal poet.

== Early life ==
Tavan was born in 1833 in Châteauneuf-de-Gadagne.

== Career ==
On 21 May 1854, he co-founded the Félibrige movement with Joseph Roumanille, Frédéric Mistral, Théodore Aubanel, Jean Brunet, Paul Giéra and Anselme Mathieu.

He published a collection of romantic poems in Provençal, Amour e plour, in 1876.

He attended the fiftieth anniversary of the Félibrige on 22 May 1904 with Mistral; all the other co-founders had died.

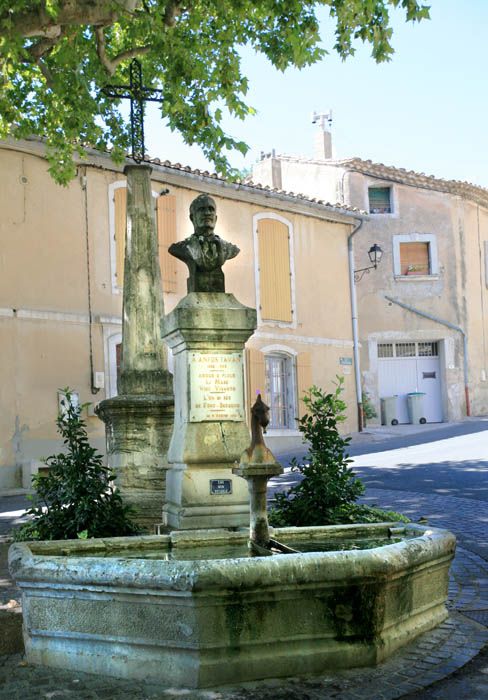
Bust in Châteauneuf-de-Gadagne.

== Death ==
He died in 1905 in his hometown of Châteauneuf-de-Gadagne.

== Legacy ==
His bust adorns a fountain in Châteauneuf-de-Gadagne.

The Collège Alphonse Tavan, a secondary school in Avignon, is named in his honour.
