= Occitania (disambiguation) =

Occitania (Occitan: Occitània) or Occitanie (from French) is a cultural region in southern France.

Occitania or Occitanie may also refer to

- Occitania (administrative region), the present-day French region
- Occitània, a magazine formerly published by the Felibrige
