= Mistralian norm =

Occitan orthography first used in the 1850s

The Mistralian norm is a linguistic norm for the Occitan language. It was first used in a published work by Joseph Roumanille in 1853, and then by Frédéric Mistral in 1854. Its aim is to make Provençal Occitan orthography closer to French, relying on a mixture of traditional spelling and French spelling conventions.

The Tresor dòu Felibrige, published by the Félibrige in 1878, was written entirely in the Mistralian norm.

== Comparison ==
Comparison between the Mistralian and Classical norms
Classical norm	Mistralian norm
Mirèlha, Cant I Cante una chata de Provença. Dins leis amors de sa jovença, A travèrs de la Crau, vèrs la mar, dins lei blats, Umble [Umil] escolan dau grand Omèra [Omèr], Ieu la vòle seguir. Coma èra Ren qu'una chata de la tèrra, En fòra de la Crau se n'es gaire parlat.	Mirèio, Cant I (F. Mistral); Cante uno chato de Prouvènço. Dins lis amour de sa jouvènço, A travès de la Crau, vers la mar, dins li blad, Umble escoulan dóu grand Oumèro, Iéu la vole segui. Coume èro Rèn qu'uno chato de la terro, En foro de la Crau se n'es gaire parla.

Some features include:

- Using the letter o to represent a final [ɔ] or [o], where Classical Occitan uses a. For example, chata becomes chato in the text above.
- Using ou to represent [u], where Classical Occitan uses o. For example, escolan becomes escoulan in the text above.
- Using gn to represent [ɲ], where Classical Occitan uses nh. For example, montanha becomes mountagno.
- Using o to represent [ɔ], where Classical Occitan uses ò. For example, pòrta becomes porto.

== Encoding ==
The IETF language subtag for the norm is oc-grmistr.
