= Bref double =

Bref double is a French poetic form consisting of 3 quatrains and a final couplet, making 14 lines.

There is some debate about the rhyme scheme, though in all versions the scheme consists of three rhymes and 4-5 un-rhymed lines, providing the bref double's primary distinction from sonnets.

According to Lyon, the bref double has a single form with a fixed rhyme scheme and, most distinctively, only the first two quatrains share a final rhyme (unrhymed lines shown as $\mathrm{X}$): $\mathrm{AXBC \,\, XAXC \,\, AXAB \,\, AB}$.

According to Turco, the bref double does have three rhymes, but the scheme is such that the first two of must appear twice in the first three quatrains—all of which end with the third rhyme, with five unrhymed lines. In Turco's given example the scheme looks like this: $\mathrm{AXBC \,\, XAXC \,\, BXXC \,\, AB}$.

However, other variants are possible, such as: $\mathrm{AXXB \,\, CXXB \,\, ACXB \,\, AC}$.

Both sources agree that there is no requirement of meter in a bref double, though all lines must be consistent in length.
