= Marius Jouveau =

French poet

- Born: 8 January 1878; Avignon, France
- Died: 14 October 1949 (aged 71); Aix-en-Provence, France
- Occupation: Poet

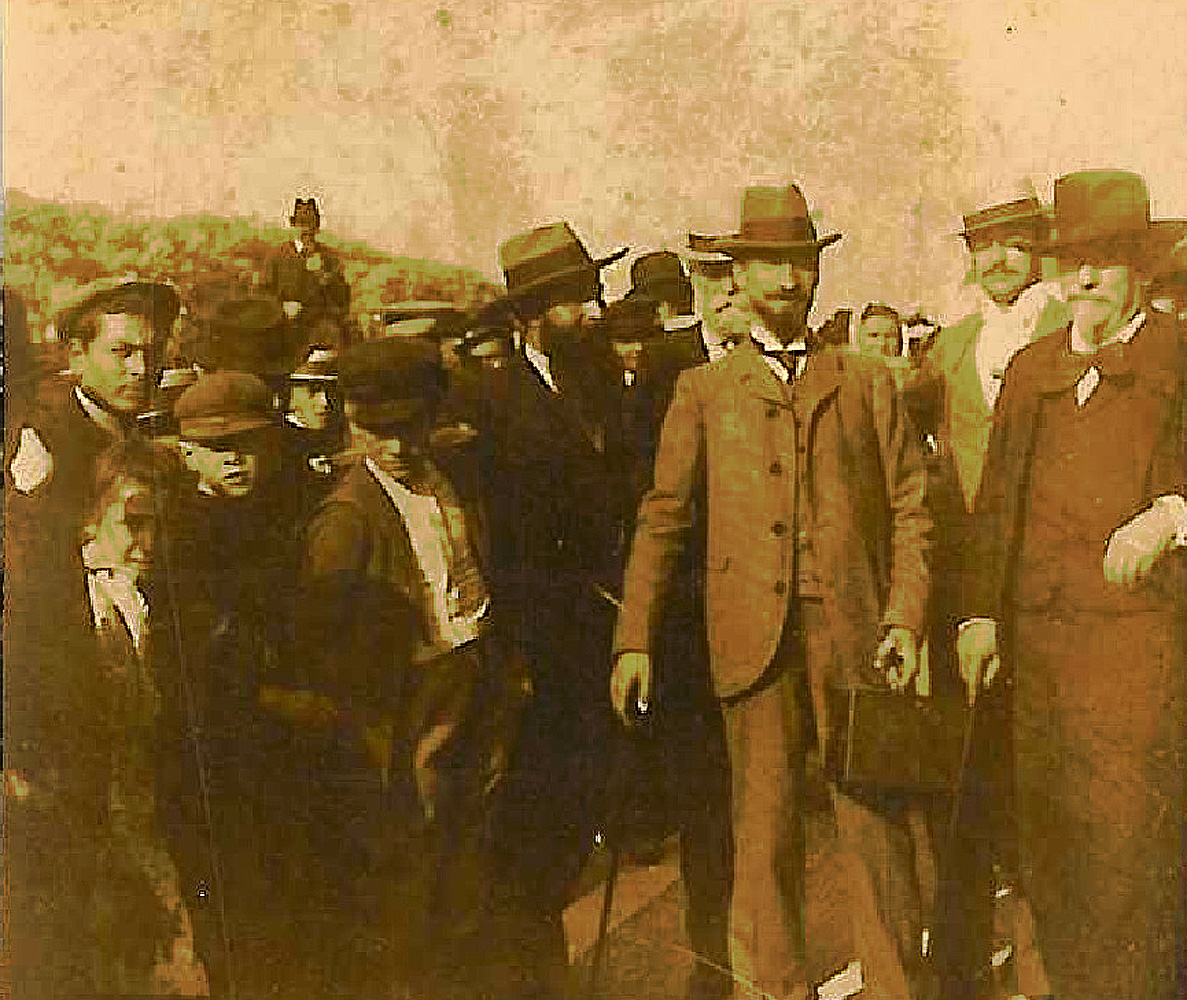
Marius Jouveau

Marius Jouveau (8 January 1878 – 14 October 1949) was a French poet. He served as the capoulie (or president) of the Félibrige from 1922 to 1941. On 11 August 1940 Jouveau wrote a letter to Marshal Philippe Pétain arguing that the Révolution nationale and the Félibrige shared the same values.

== Works ==
- Jouveau, Marius; Di Giovanni, Alessio (1921). Image flourentin : pouèmo prouvençau. Avignoun: Roumanille. OCLC 489808306.
- Jouveau, Marius (1923). Pignard lou mounedié : conte arlaten. Avignoun: J. Roumanille. OCLC 489783553.
- Jouveau, Marius; Loustaunau, Jean-Marie (1926). Pouèmo francescan pèr lou seten centenàri de Sant Francés d'Assiso : 1226-1926. Avignoun: J. Roumanille. OCLC 489982514.
- Jouveau, Marius (1930). Sèt cansoun d'Arle : pouèmo prouvençau. Avignoun: J. Roumanille. OCLC 489841610.
