= Châteauneuf-de-Gadagne =

Châteauneuf-de-Gadagne Castèunòu de Gadanha (Occitan)
- Commune
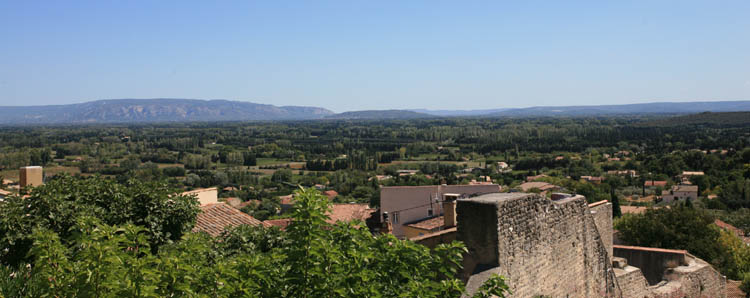
- View of Châteauneuf-de-Gadagne

- Coat of arms
- Location of Châteauneuf-de-Gadagne
- Location within France Location within Provence-Alpes-Côte d'Azur
- Coordinates: 43°55′41″N 4°56′46″E
- Country: France
- Region: Provence-Alpes-Côte d'Azur
- Department: Vaucluse
- Arrondissement: Avignon
- Canton: L'Isle-sur-la-Sorgue
- Intercommunality: Pays des Sorgues et des Monts de Vaucluse

Government
  - Mayor (2020–2026): Étienne Klein
- Area^{1}: 13.48 km^{2} (5.20 sq mi)
- Elevation: 48 m (157 ft)
- Highest elevation: 124 m (407 ft)
- Lowest elevation: 41 m (135 ft)
- Population (2023): 3,565
  - Density: 264.5/km^{2} (685.0/sq mi)
- Time zone: UTC+01:00 (CET)
  - Summer (DST): UTC+02:00 (CEST)
- INSEE/Postal code: 84036 /84470
- ^{1} French Land Register data, which excludes lakes, ponds, glaciers > 1 km^{2} (0.386 sq mi or 247 acres) and river estuaries.

Châteauneuf-de-Gadagne (French: [ʃɑtonœf də ɡadaɲ]; Occitan: Gadanha) is a commune in the Vaucluse department in the Provence-Alpes-Côte d'Azur region in Southeastern France.

== History ==
The Félibrige was founded in Châteauneuf-de-Gadagne, at Font-Ségugne, in 1854.

== Geography ==
Châteauneuf-de-Gadagne is located 12 km (7.4 mi) east of Avignon. It is served by Gadagne station (opened in 1868) on the line from Avignon to Miramas.

== Population ==
Historical population
Year	Pop.	±% p.a.
1968	1,349	—
1975	1,678	+3.17%
1982	2,021	+2.69%
1990	2,619	+3.29%
1999	2,838	+0.90%
2007	3,199	+1.51%
2012	3,279	+0.50%
2017	3,311	+0.19%
2023	3,565	+1.24%
Source: INSEE

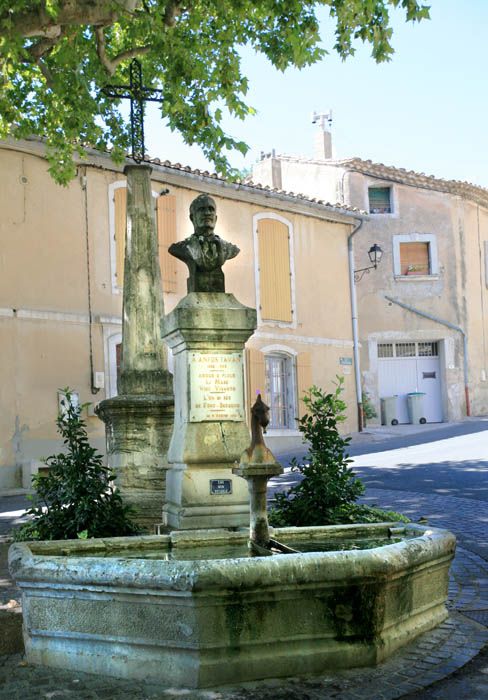
Fountain in Châteauneuf-de-Gadagne, with a bust of native Alphonse Tavan, one of the co-founders of the Félibrige.

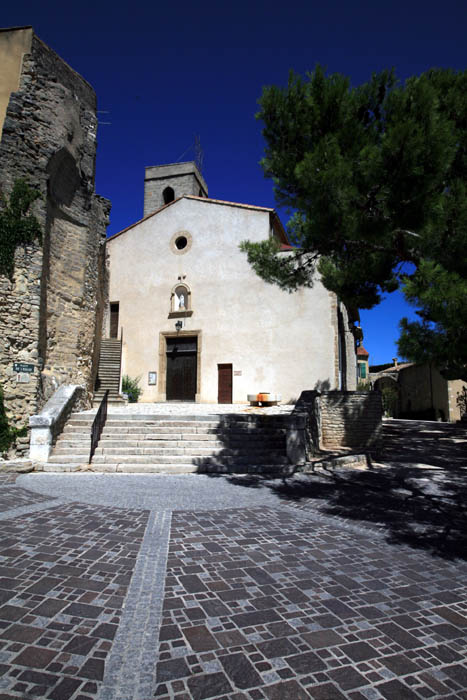
Église Saint-Jean-Baptiste

== International relations ==
Châteauneuf-de-Gadagne is twinned with:

- Perroy, Switzerland

== See also ==
- Communes of the Vaucluse department
