= Joseph Roumanille =

French Provençal poet (1818–1891)

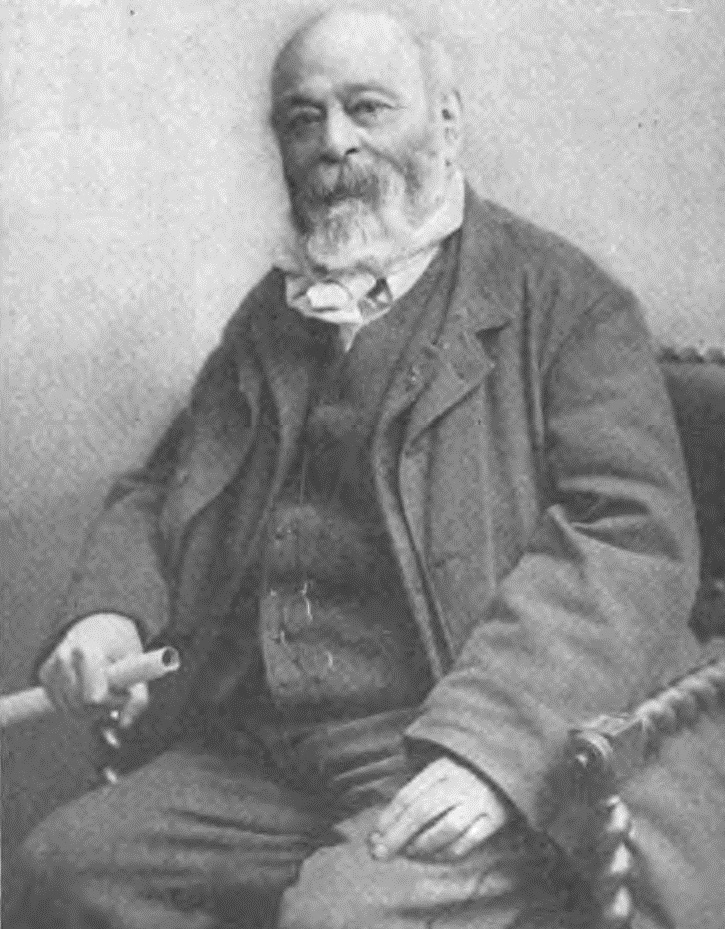
Portrait of Joseph Roumanille

Joseph Roumanille (Occitan: Josèp Romanilha; 8 August 1818 – 24 May 1891) was a Provençal poet. He was born at Saint-Rémy-de-Provence (Bouches-du-Rhône), and is commonly known in southern France as the father of the Félibrige, for he first conceived the idea of raising his regional language to the dignity of a literary language.

== Biography ==
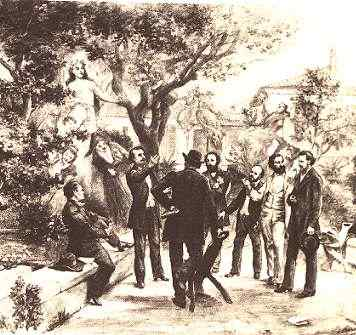
Meeting of the Félibrige in 1854: Frédéric Mistral, Joseph Roumanille, Théodore Aubanel, Jean Brunet, Paul Giéra, Anselme Mathieu, Alphonse Tavan

Joseph Roumanille was the son of Jean-Denis Roumanille and Pierrette Piquet. He studied at the nearby collège (junior highschool) of Tarascon (Bouches-du-Rhône) from 1834. After working as clerc de notaire in the same town from 1836 to 1839, Roumanille published his first verses in the Écho du Rhône. He then worked as a teacher in Nyons (Drôme), and later at the Dupuy collège in Avignon. When Roumanille was a teacher at Avignon, he discovered the genius of Frédéric Mistral, one of his pupils, and together they began what later became the Félibrean movement.

He married Rose-Anaïs Gras, sister of Provençal poet and novelist Félix Gras.

In 1888, Roumanille succeeded Frédéric Mistral to become 2nd Capoulie of the Félibrige, an association devoted to the Provençal language and Provençal literature. He died in Avignon in the morning of 24 May 1891. His funeral was held on 26 May in Avignon and he was buried in Saint-Rémy-de-Provence Cemetery, in the same grave as his parents.

== Works ==
In 1847 Roumanille published a volume of verse called Li Marbarideto and in 1851 another entitled Li Sounjarello. In 1852 along with Mistral and Anselme Mathieu he edited a collection of Provençal verse called Li Prouvençalo. In 1853 he wrote a dissertation on Provençal spelling. The complete edition of his works includes Lis oubreto en vers, Lis oubreto en proso, Li capelan, Li conte prouvençau e li cascareleto, Li nouvé, Lis entarrochin and Letters. His writing is wholesome and simple, reflecting the country folk of the region.

== See also ==
- Provençal literature
