= Félibrige =

Association to promote Provençal language and literature

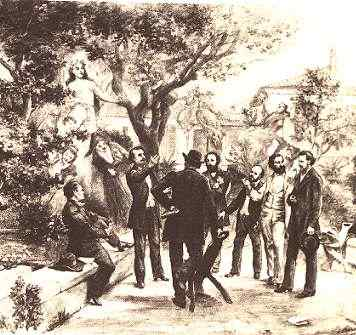
Meeting of the Félibrige in 1854: Frédéric Mistral, Joseph Roumanille, Théodore Aubanel, Jean Brunet, Paul Giéra, Anselme Mathieu, Alphonse Tavan

The Félibrige (French pronunciation: [felibʁiʒ]; Lo Felibritge in classical Occitan, Lou Felibrige in Mistralian spelling, pronounced [lu feliˈβɾidʒe]) is a literary and cultural association founded in 1854 by Frédéric Mistral and other Provençal writers to defend and promote the Occitan language (also called the langue d'Oc) and literature. It is presided over by a capoulié (classical norm: capolièr). The name possibly derives from an apocryphal Provençal story of Christ disputing in the temple with the seven doctors [sét félibre] of law.

== Etymology ==
The word félibrige is derived from félibre, word of unclear origin.

== Origins ==
The seven-pointed star of the Félibrige on the flag of Occitania, above and to the right of the central Occitan cross

Le Félibrige was founded at the Château de Font-Ségugne (located in Châteauneuf-de-Gadagne, Vaucluse) on 21 May 1854 (Saint Estelle's day), by seven young Provençal poets: Théodore Aubanel, Jean Brunet, Paul Giéra, Anselme Mathieu, Frédéric Mistral, Joseph Roumanille and Alphonse Tavan. Together, they aimed to restore the Provençal language and codify its orthography.

Its symbol is a seven-pointed star which, as Frederic Mistral writes in Lou tresor dóu Felibrige, is "a tribute to its seven founders".

The movement was launched in Provence but quickly reached the entire Occitania. It spread among Occitanian writers such as Michel Camélat and Simin Palay (from Gascony and Béarn), Albert Arnavielle, Justin Bessou, Jacques and Gabriel Azaïs and Achille Mir (Languedoc), Arsène Vermenouze (Auvergne), Joseph Roux (Limousin), José Mange (Provence), Brémonde de Tarascon (Bouches-du-Rhône), Batisto Bonnet (Gard) and Charles Maurras.

The Félibrige is an organisation focussed on protecting and promoting Occitan language and culture, fighting for recognition of cultural diversity both within France and across the wider world. It is also one of the two organisations represented across Occitania since 1945, along with the Institut d'Estudis Occitans (IEO).

== Felebrigian festivals ==
There is a yearly meeting, Santo Estello, held in a different town in the Pays d'Oc. The traditional banquet is ended with the ritual of the Copa Santa.

There are also other Fêtes Félibréennes:

- Since 1323, the Jeux floraux of Toulouse, considered as the model
- Jeux floraux of Barcelona
- Orange
- In 1868 at Saint-Rémy-de-Provence
- In 1895 at Vic-en-Carladès, with a programme of music and dance (Cabrette)
- In 1900 at the Château de Ventadour, under the name Fête de l'églantine
- In 1902 at Béziers
- In June 1903 and in 2009 at Sceaux
- In 1907 at Mauvezin, in the Hautes-Pyrénées
- In August 1914, at Sauveterre-de-Béarn
- At Puy-en-Velay
- In 1935 at Monistrol-sur-Loire
- Perhaps Argentat, after 1935 with the Chorale des gabariers de la Dordogne

== The Jardin des Félibres in Sceaux ==
In 1950 Sceaux, Hauts-de-Seine (one of the Parisien banlieue) was named Cité Félibréenne. A memorial garden for this event was created around the tomb of Jean-Pierre Claris de Florian, a French poet and romancier, well known for his fables and a noted Félibrigist (perhaps because his mother was Castilian). The garden displays eleven busts in all.

The garden is located behind the church of Saint Jean-Baptiste (Saint John the Baptist) in Sceaux. The entry, signed: Parc de Sceaux, Jardin des Félibres is located on Avenue du Président Franklin Roosevelt in Sceaux.

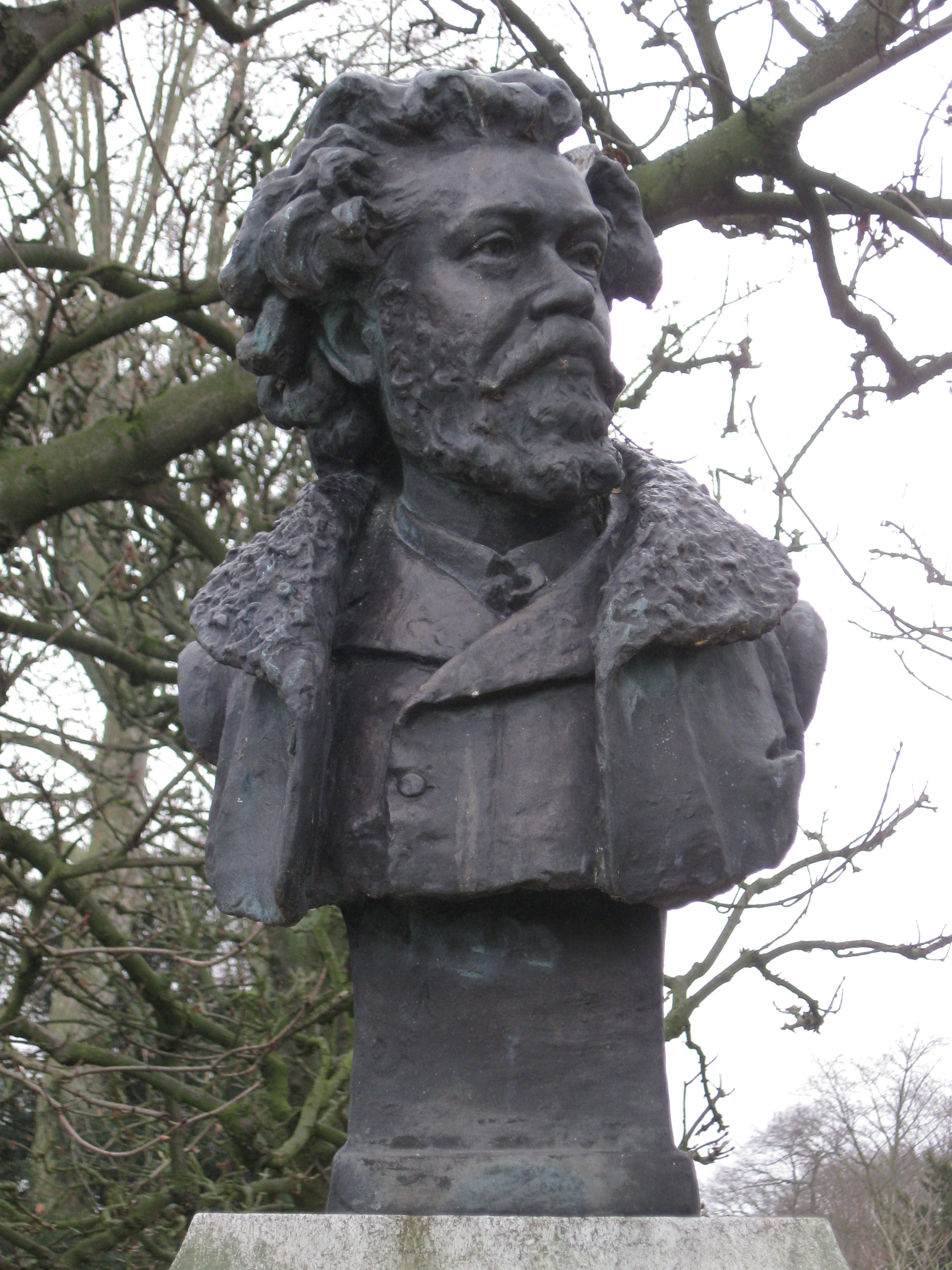
Clovis Hugues

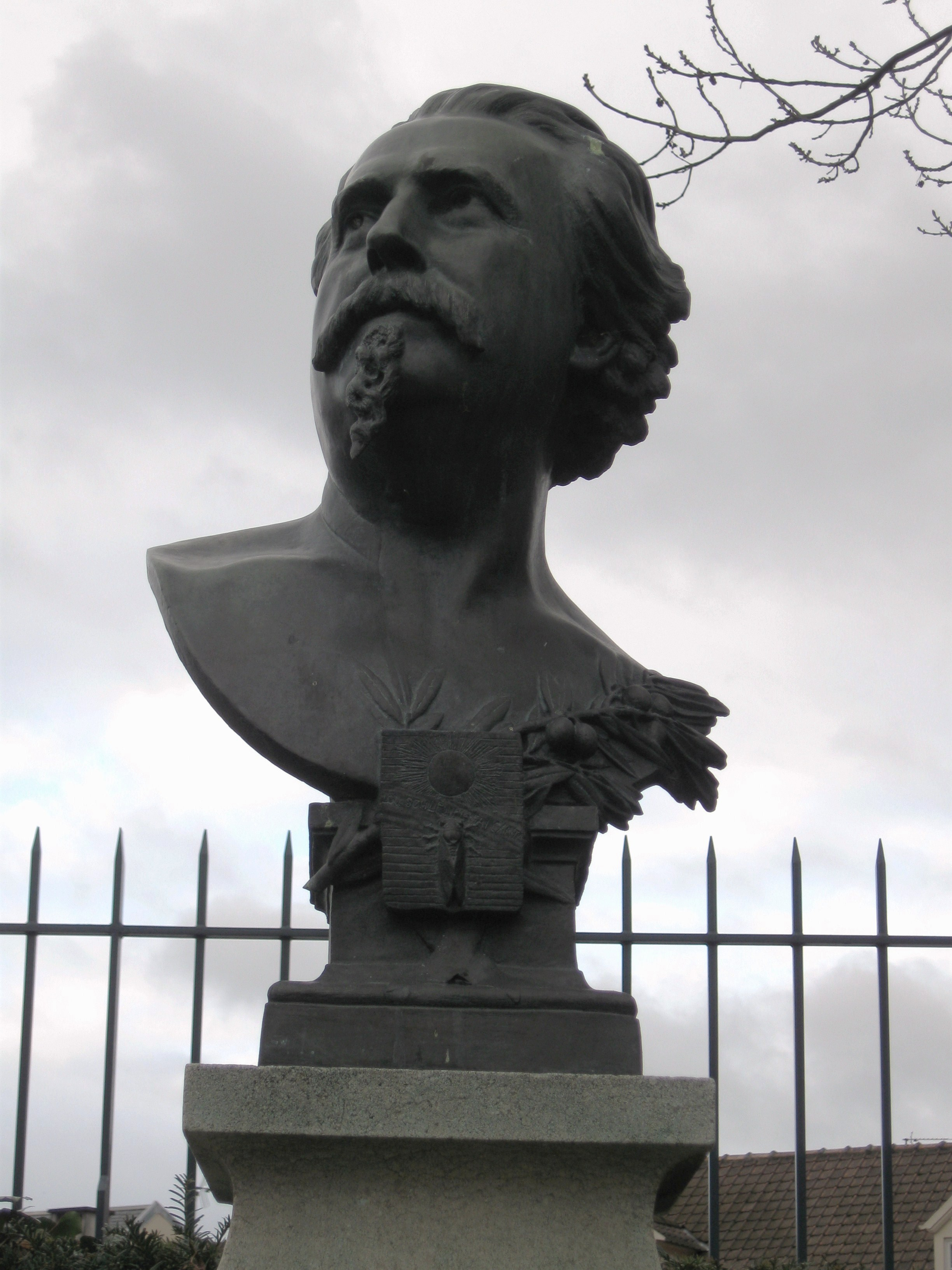
Frédéric Mistral

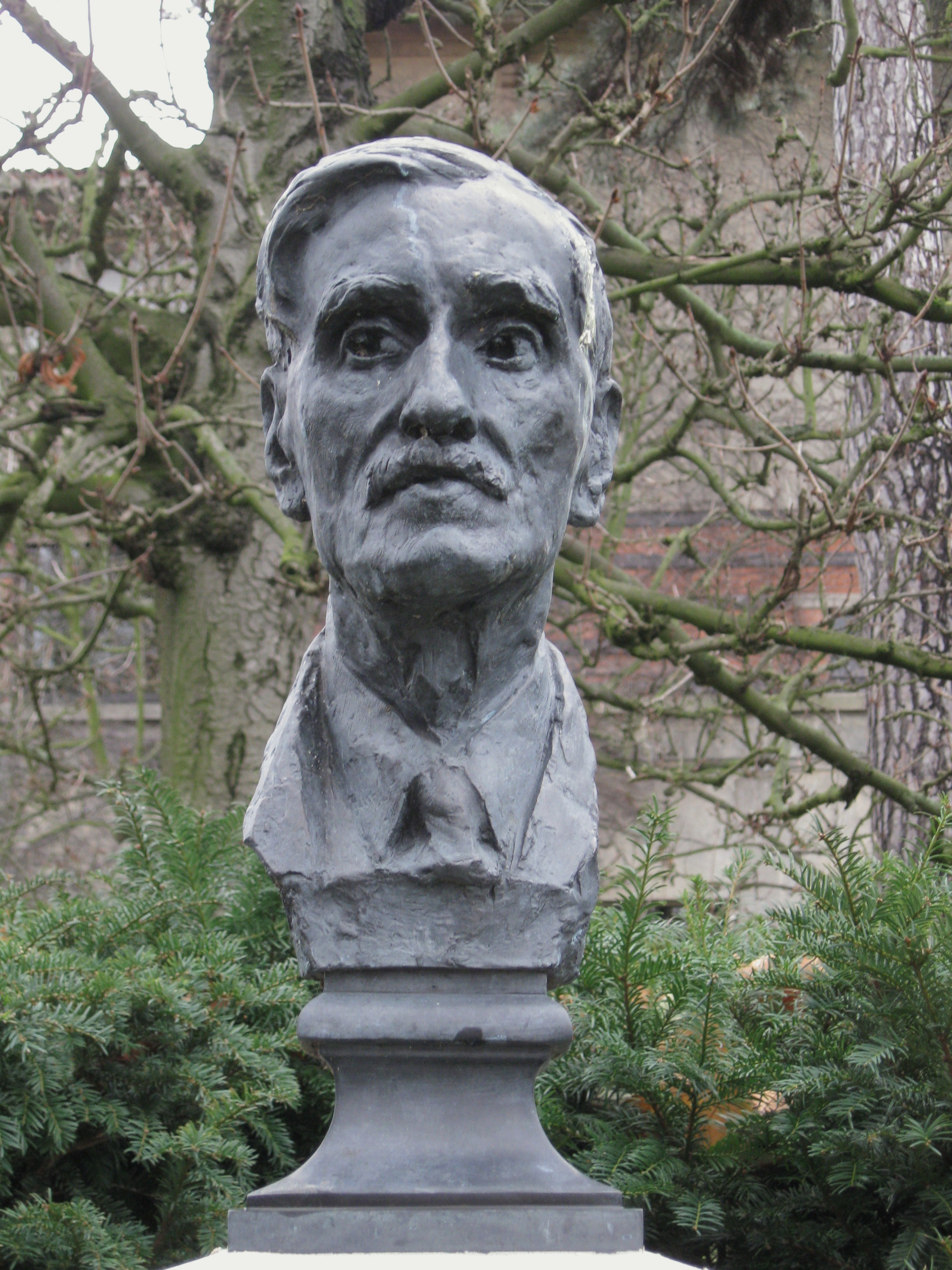
Jean Charles-Brun

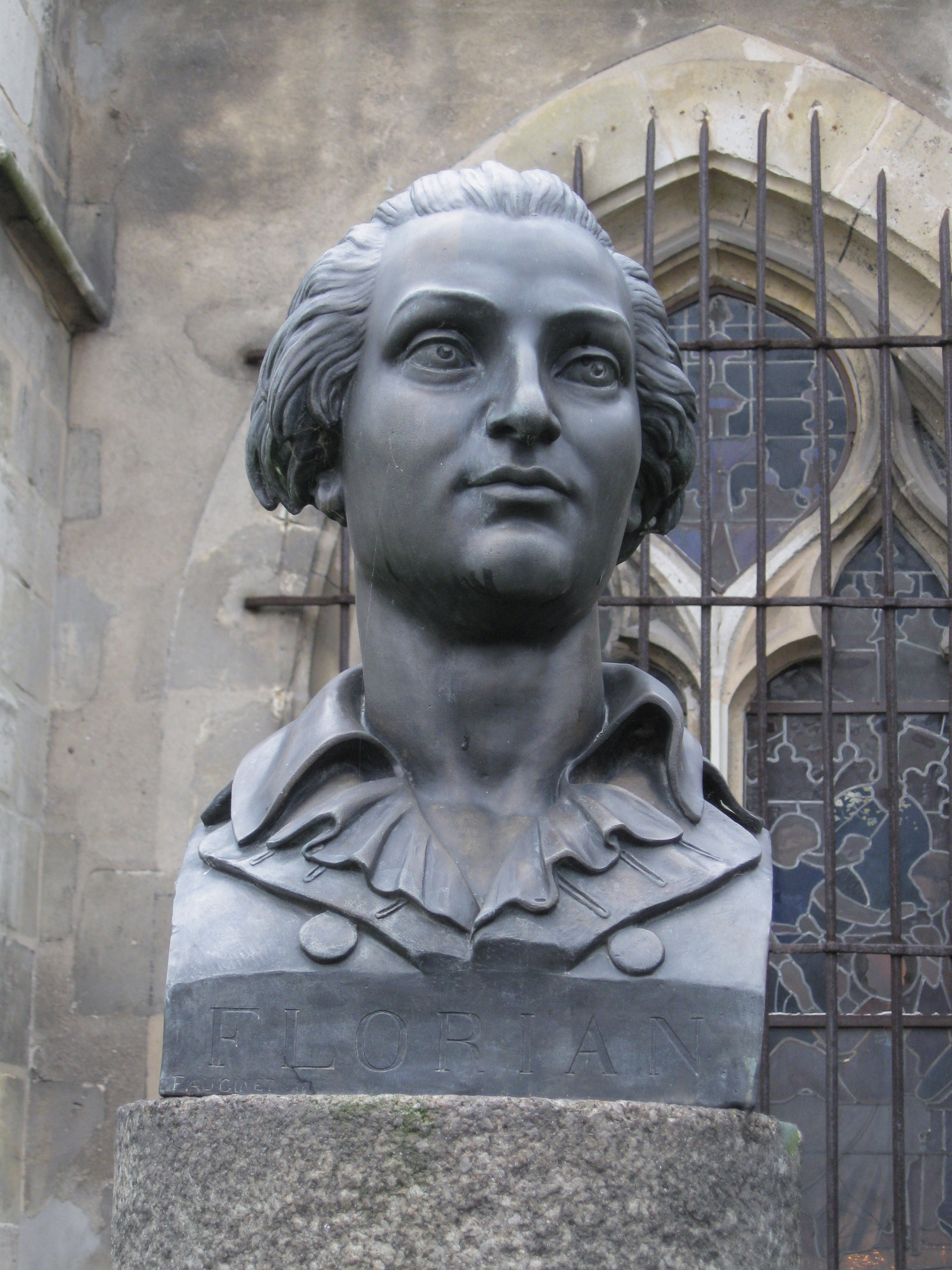
Jean-Pierre Claris de Florian

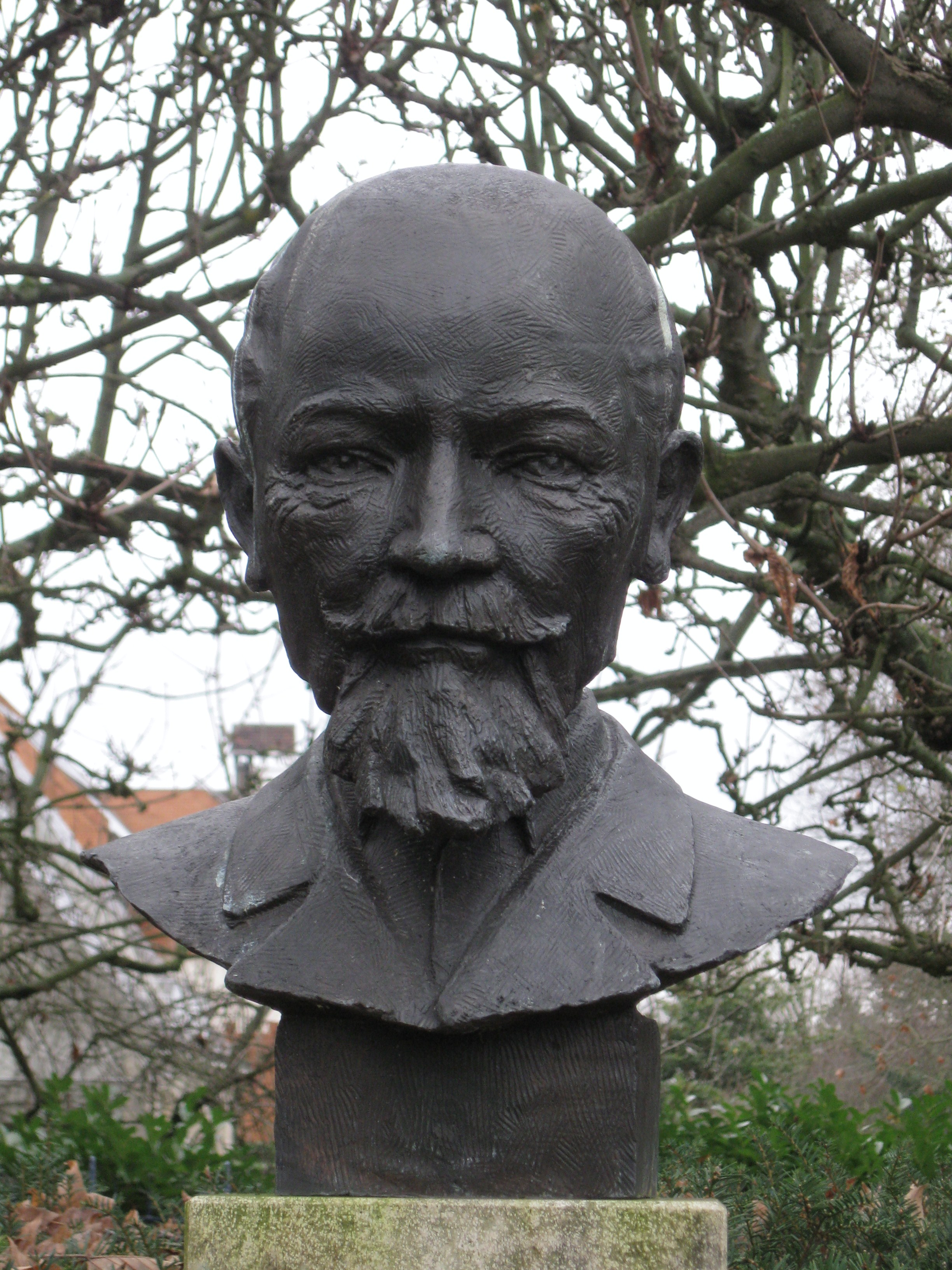
Joseph Loubet

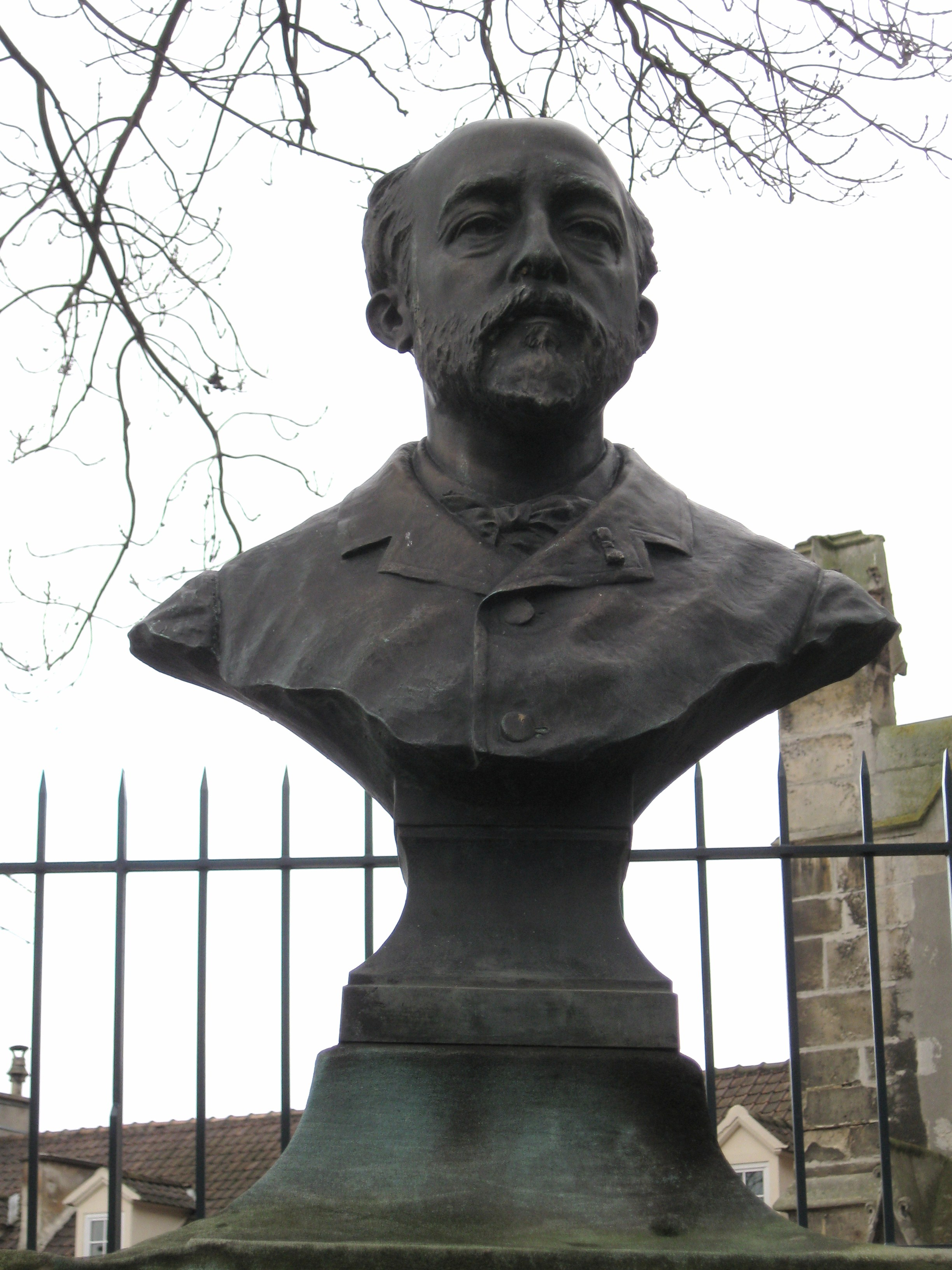
Paul Arène

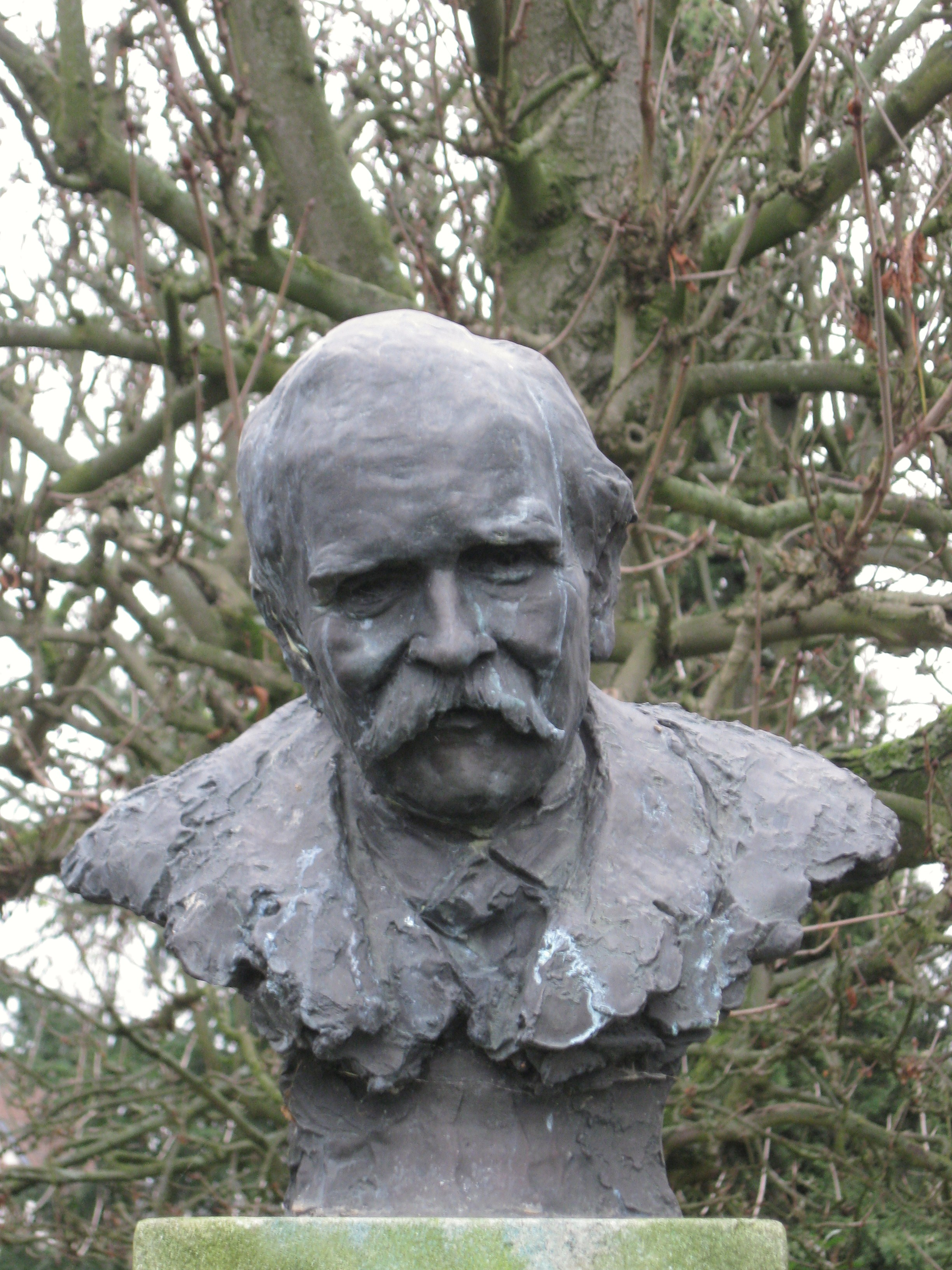
Pierre Deluns-Montaud

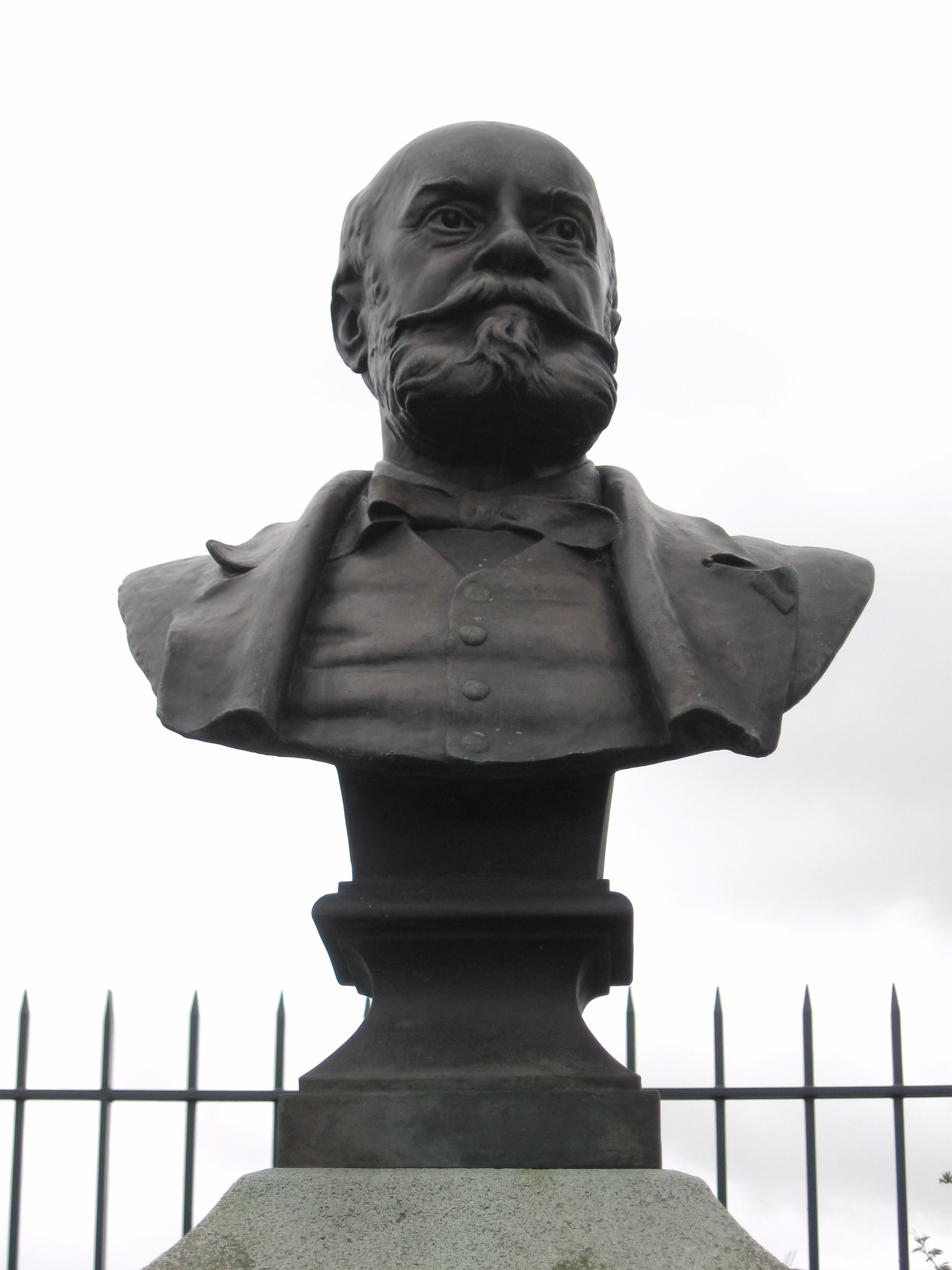
Théodore Aubanel

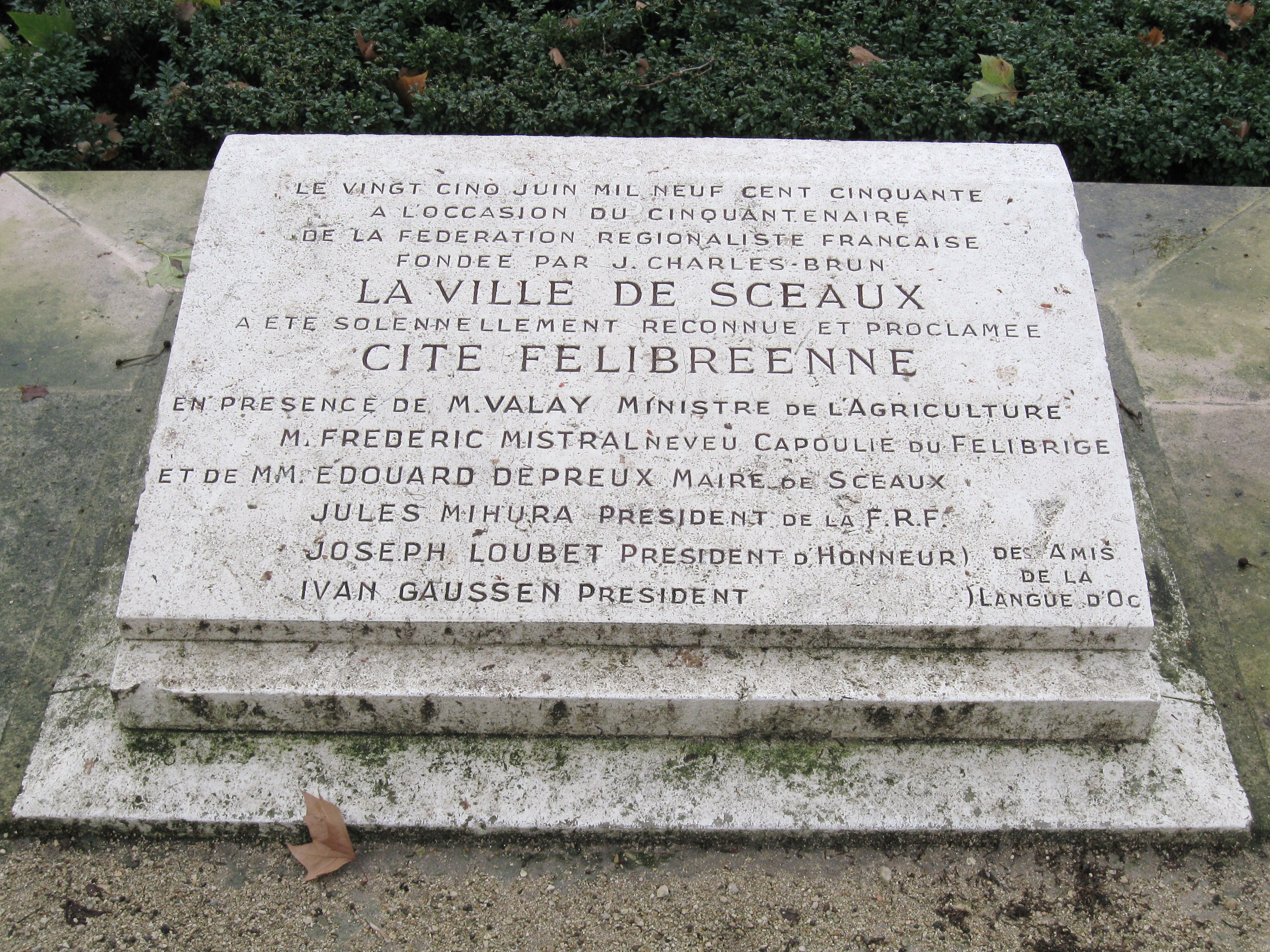
Commemorative plaque

== Capouliés of the Félibrige ==
The Félibrige is presided over by a capoulié.

- 1876–1888: Frédéric Mistral
- 1888–1891: Joseph Roumanille
- 1891–1901: Félix Gras
- 1901–1909: Pierre Devoluy
- 1909–1919: Valère Bernard
- 1919–1922: Joseph Fallen
- 1922–1941: Marius Jouveau
- 1941–1956: Frédéric Mistral
- 1956–1962: Charles Rostaing
- 1962–1971: Elie Bachas
- 1971–1982: René Jouveau
- 1982–1989: Paul Roux
- 1989–1992: Paul Pons
- 1992–2006: Pierre Fabre
- 2006–2022: Jacques Mouttet
- 2022–: Paulin Reynard

== See also ==
- François-Juste-Marie Raynouard
- Occitan
- Provençal dialect
- Niçois
- Troubadour
- La Coupo Santo
- Le Jardin des Félibres in Sceaux
- Marguerite Genès
- Margareta Priolo

== Sources ==
- Eugène Lintilhac, Les Félibres, 1895, édition Alphonse Lemerre, in-12°, 136 p. Première partie – Félibres et Félibrige : L'énigme du Félibrige : les félibres de Paris, Cigaliers et félibres de Paris, le royaume poètique de Sainte-Estelle le capoulié Félix Gras, Un jour de printemps chez Mistral. Deuxième partie – Théodore Aubanel, La genése du Félibrige et Aubanel, le mouvement de Mistral, Jasmin, l'oeuvre d'Aubanel.
- La Plume, revue littéraire artistique et sociale, Paris, dir. Léon Deschamps, n° 53 du 1 juillet 1891, p. 213–237 du recueil annuel. (Numéro consacré au Félibrige à l’occasion de la mort de Joseph Roumanille)
- Émile Ripert, La Renaissance Provençale, Paris, Librairie Champion, 1918
- Émile Ripert, Le Félibrige, Armand Colin, 1924; réédition Éditions Jeanne Laffitte, 2001 ISBN 2-86276-363-2
- René Jouveau, Histoire du Félibrige (4 volumes), Imprimerie Bené, Nîmes, 1970–1979; réédition 1984-1987
- Valère Bernard, Bagatouni, rééd. Alandis Editions, 2000.
- Philippe Martel, Les Félibres et leur temps : Renaissance d'oc et opinion (1850-1914), Bordeaux, PUB, 2010
