= Théodore Aubanel =

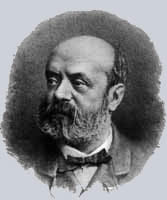
Théodore Aubanel

Théodore Aubanel (Occitan:Teodòr Aubanèu; 26 March 1829 – 2 November 1886) was a Provençal poet. He was born in Avignon in a family of printers.

Aubanel started writing poetry in French but quickly switched to Provençal, due to the influence of Joseph Roumanille. He is known primarily for La Miougrano entreduberto (1860, The Split Pomegranate) and Li Fiho d'Avignoun (1885, The Young Ladies of Avignon), two collections of lyric poems.

He died in Avignon.

== See also ==
- Provençal literature
