= Provençal dialect =

Dialect of Occitan

Provençal
- prouvençau (mistralian norm) provençal/provençau (classical norm)
- Native to: France, Italy, Monaco
- Native speakers: (350,000 cited 1990)
- Language family: Indo-European: Italic; Latino-Faliscan; Latin; Romance; Italo-Western; Western Romance; Gallo-Romance; Occitano-Romance; Occitan; Provençal

Language codes
- ISO 639-3: prv (retired); subsumed in oci
- Glottolog: prov1235
- ELP: Provençal
- IETF: oc-provenc
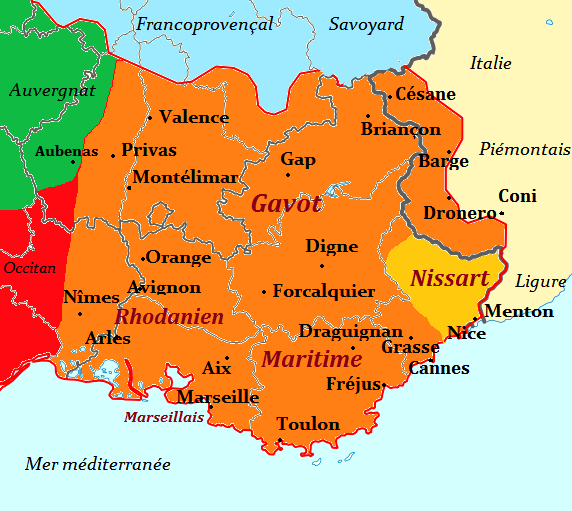
- Subdialects of the Provençal dialect with the exception of Gavòt in France and Cisalpine in Italy.

Provençal (/ˌprɒvɒ̃ˈsɑːl/, also UK: /-sæl/, US: /ˌproʊ-, -vən-/, French: [pʁɔvɑ̃sal]; Occitan: provençau or prouvençau [pʀuvenˈsaw]) is a variety of Occitan, spoken by people in Provence and parts of Drôme and Gard. The term Provençal used to refer to the entire Occitan language, but more recently it has referred only to the variety of Occitan spoken in Provence. However, it can still be found being used to refer to Occitan as a whole, e.g. Merriam-Webster states that it can be used to refer to general Occitan, though this is going out of use.

Provençal is also the customary name given to the older version of the Occitan language used by the troubadours of medieval literature, when Old French or the langue d'oïl was limited to the northern areas of France. Thus, the ISO 639-3 code for Old Occitan is [pro].

In 2007, all the ISO 639-3 codes for Occitan dialects, including [prv] for Provençal, were retired and merged into [oci] Occitan. The old codes ([prv], [auv], [gsc], [lms], [lnc]) are no longer in active use, but still have the meaning assigned to them when they were established in the Standard.

Some groups have called for Provençal's recognition as a full language, distinct from Occitan. The Regional Council of Provence has variously labelled Provençal as a dialect of Occitan or as a distinct language, depending on different lobbies and political majorities.

== Subdialects ==
The main subdialects of Provençal are:

- Rodanenc (in French Rhodanien) around the lower Rhone river, Arles, Avignon, Nîmes.
  - A Rodanenc subvariety, the Shuadit (or Judeo-Provençal), has been considered extinct since 1977. It was spoken by the Jewish community around Avignon. When Jews were granted freedom of residence in France the dialect declined.
- Maritim or Centrau or Mediterranèu (Maritime or Central or Mediterranean) around Aix-en-Provence, Marseille, Toulon, Cannes, Antibes, Grasse, Forcalquier, Castellane, Draguignan.
- Niçard in the lower County of Nice.

Gavòt (in French Gavot), spoken in the Western Occitan Alps, around Digne, Sisteron, Gap, Barcelonnette and the upper County of Nice, but also in a part of the Ardèche, is not exactly a subdialect of Provençal, but rather a closely related Occitan dialect, also known as Vivaro-Alpine. So is the dialect spoken in the upper valleys of Piedmont, Italy (Val Maira, Val Varaita, Val Stura di Demonte, Entracque, Limone Piemonte, Vinadio, Sestriere). Some people view Gavòt as a variety of Provençal since a part of the Gavot area (near Digne and Sisteron) belongs to historical Provence.

== Orthography ==
When written in the Mistralian norm ("normo mistralenco"), definite articles are lou in the masculine singular, la in the feminine singular and li in the masculine and feminine plural (lis before vowels). Nouns and adjectives usually drop the Latin masculine endings, but -e remains; the feminine ending is -o (this is the opposite of the neighbouring Italian masculine gender). Nouns do not inflect for number, but all adjectives ending in vowels (-e or -o) become -i, and all plural adjectives take -s before vowels.

When written in the classical norm ("nòrma classica"), definite articles are masculine lo [lu], feminine la [la], and plural lei/leis [lej/lejz = li/liz]. Nouns and adjectives usually drop the Latin masculine endings, but -e [e] remains; the feminine ending is -a [ɔ]. Nouns inflect for number, all adjectives ending in vowels (-e or -a) become -ei/-eis [ej/ejz = i/iz] in some syntactic positions, and most plural adjectives take -s.

Comparison of articles and endings between the two norms
		English	Mistralian norm	Classical norm
Singular	Masculine	the good friend	lou bon ami [lu ˌbɔn aˈmi]	lo bòn amic [lu ˌbɔn aˈmi]
Singular	Feminine	the good friend	la bono amigo [la ˌbɔn aˈmigɔ]	la bòna amiga [la ˌbɔn aˈmigɔ]
Plural	Masculine	the good friends	li bons ami [lej ˌbɔnz aˈmi] = [li ˌbɔnz aˈmi]	lei bòns amics [lej ˌbɔnz aˈmi] = [li ˌbɔnz aˈmi]
Plural	Feminine	the good friends	li bònis amigo [lei ˈbɔnejz aˈmigɔ] = [li ˈbɔniz aˈmigɔ]	lei bòneis amigas [lei ˈbɔnejz aˈmigɔ] = [li ˈbɔniz aˈmigɔ]

Pronunciation remains the same in both norms (Mistralian and classical), which are only two different ways to write the same language.

The IETF language tags register oc-provenc-grmistr for the Mistralian orthography and oc-provenc-grclass for the classical one.

== Literature ==
Modern Provençal literature was given impetus by Nobel laureate Frédéric Mistral and the association, Félibrige, which he founded with other writers, such as Théodore Aubanel. The beginning of the 20th century saw other authors like Joseph d'Arbaud, Batisto Bonnet and Valère Bernard. It has been enhanced and modernized since the second half of the 20th century by writers such as Robèrt Lafont, Pierre Pessemesse, Claude Barsotti, Max-Philippe Delavouët, Philippe Gardy, Florian Vernet, Danielle Julien, Jòrgi Gròs, Sèrgi Bec, Bernat Giély, and many others.

== See also ==
- Occitan conjugation
- Languages of France
