= Cimetière Saint-Pierre (Marseille) =

Cemetery in Marseille, France

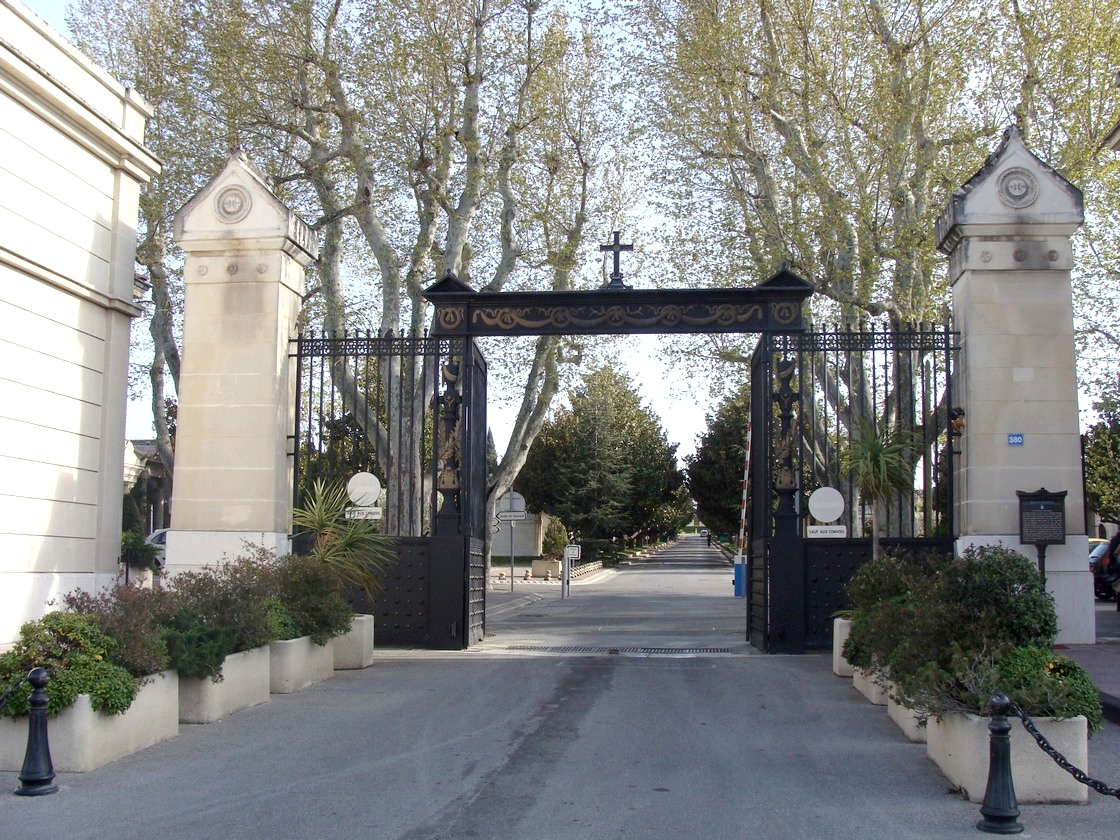
- Interactive map of Cimetière Saint-Pierre

Details
- Established: 1863
- Location: 380 Rue Saint-Pierre, 13005 Marseille
- Country: France
- Coordinates: 43°17′28″N 5°24′45″E
- Size: 63 ha (160 acres)
- Find a Grave: Cimetière Saint-Pierre

The Cimetière Saint-Pierre is the largest cemetery in the city of Marseille, Southern France.

== Location ==
It is located at number 380 on Rue Saint-Pierre in the 5th arrondissement of Marseille.

== Overview ==
The cemetery is the third largest cemetery in France after the Cimetière parisien de Pantin and the Cimetière parisien de Thiais, both of which are located in the Parisian region. It was established on 25 September 1855. However, it was only inaugurated on 30 December 1863.

== Notable burials ==
=== Artists ===
- Antonin Artaud (1896–1948), playwright
- Léo Nègre (1906–1998), songwriter
- Edmond Rostand (1868–1918), playwright
- Vincent Scotto (1874–1952), music composer
- Henri Verneuil (1920–2002), screenwriter
- Henri Alibert (1889–1951), actor
- Rellys (1905–1991), actor
- Gaby Deslys (1881–1920), singer
- Berthe Sylva (1885–1941), singer
- Ernest Reyer (1823–1909), music composer
- Émile Loubon (1809–1863), painter
- Pierre Ambrogiani (1906–1985), painter
- Valère Bernard (1860–1936), painter
- Charles Camoin (1879–1965), painter
- Antoine Marius Gianelli (1896–1983), painter
- Paul Gondard (1884–1953), sculptor
- Henri Christiné (1867–1941), music composer
- Andrée Turcy (1891–1974), actor
- Élie-Jean Vézien (1890–1982), sculptor
- Auguste Vimar (1851–1916), illustrator
- André Roussin (1911–1987), playwright
- Constant Roux (1869–1942), sculptor
- Antoine Sartorio (1885–1988), sculptor
- Louis Ducreux (1911–1992), screenwriter
- Antoine Ferrari (1910–1995), painter
- Milly Mathis (1901–1965), actor
- Alida Rouffe (1874–1949), actor
- Jean-Vital Jammes (1825–1893), opera singer
- René Sarvil (1901–1975), actor
- Gabriel Signoret (1878–1937), actor
- Adolphe Joseph Thomas Monticelli (1824–1886), painter
- Alphonse Moutte (1840–1913), painter
- Dominique Piazza (1860–1941), illustrator

=== Politicians and military personnel ===
- Charles Armand Septime de Faÿ de La Tour-Maubourg (1801–1845), diplomat and politician
- Alphonse Esquiros (1812–1876), poet and politician
- Joseph Thierry (1857–1918), politician
- Albert Littolff (1911–1943), military pilot
- François Charles-Roux (1879–1961), diplomat
- Émile Muselier (1882–1965), resistant
- Germaine Poinso-Chapuis (1901–1981), politician
- Gaston Defferre (1910–1986), politician
- Fifi Turin (1913–1944), war resistor
- Georges N'Guyen Van Loc (1933–2008), intelligence chief

=== Sportspeople ===
- Gunnar Andersson (1928–1969), football player
- Raymond Grassi (1930–1953), boxer
- Luc Borrelli (1965–1999), football player
- Jean Bouin (1888–1914), runner
- Gustave Ganay (1892–1926), cyclist
- Henri Rougier (1876–1956), cyclist

=== Other ===
- Alexandre Chabanon (1873–1936), missionary in Indochina
- Gaétan Picon, inventor of Sirop de Picon
- Louis Noilly and Claudius Prat, founders of Noilly Prat
- Jules Charles-Roux (1841–1918), businessman and philanthropist
- Gustave Desplaces (1820–1869), engineer
- Pascal Coste (1787–1879), architect
- Nicolas Paquet (1831–1909), businessman
- Michel-Robert Penchaud (1772–1833), architect
- Eugène Rostand (1843–1915), economist
- Joseph Héliodore Garcin de Tassy (1794–1878), academic
- Antoine Clot (1793–1868), physician and philanthropist
- Aimé Olivier de Sanderval (1840–1919), explorer
- Antoine-Fortuné Marion (1846–1900), botanist
- Jacques de Morgan (1857–1924), explorer
