= Montaigne Visiting Torquato Tasso in Prison =

Montaigne Visiting Torquato Tasso in Prison may refer to one of two paintings:

- Montaigne Visiting Torquato Tasso in Prison (Granet), an 1820 painting by François Marius Granet
- Montaigne Visiting Torquato Tasso in Prison (Richard), an 1821 painting by Fleury François Richard
