= Paul Guigou =

French painter

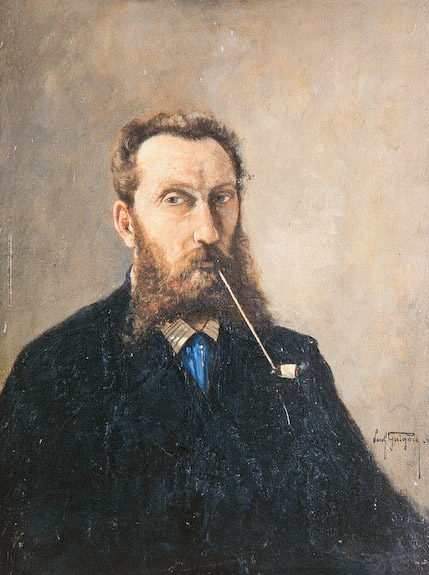
Self Portrait (1869).

Paul Camille Guigou (15 February 1834 – 21 December 1871) was a French landscape painter.

Guigou was born in Villars, Vaucluse in a wealthy family of farmers and notaries. He studied painting in Apt and later with Émile Loubon in Marseille. From 1854 to 1861, he worked as a notary clerk in Marseille. In 1863, after Loubon's death, he left Marseille for Paris, where he lived for most of his life. He frequented Café Guerbois, a regular location of many future impressionist painters.

Guigou painted mostly Provence landscapes using oil and watercolour. His early art was influenced by Loubon, and later by the Barbizon school and Gustave Courbet. He did not gain widespread recognition during his lifetime, and was often met with indifference at public exhibitions. Unable to survive financially from his own paintings, he also worked as an art tutor and critic.

He died in Paris at the age of 37 from a stroke. After his death, his pieces generally fell from the public eye for around thirty years until the Centennial Exposition of French Art in 1900, where he was rediscovered. His paintings can be found on public display in Paris and Marseille.
