= Imer =

Imer may refer to:

== People ==
- Adam Imer (born 1989) is a Brazilian field hockey player
- Teresa Imer, also known as Teresa Cornelys (1723–1797), Italian operatic soprano
- Édouard-Auguste Imer (1820–1881), French painter

== Places ==
- Imer, Trentino, Italy

== Other ==
- Instituto Mexicano de la Radio
- International Medical Evaluation and Referral
- Institute for Mineral & Energy Resources
