= Fifi Turin =

French union activist and anti-fascist activist (1913-1944)

- Born: 7 April 1913; Marseille, France
- Died: 5 August 1944 (aged 31); Fresnes Prison
- Burial place: Marseille
- Other name: Joséphine Cavallini
- Occupations: Textile worker, trade union activist, communist, resistance fighter
- Known for: Union activities and War Resistance
- Spouse: Laurent Turin

Joséphine Cavallini, known as Fifi Turin (7 April 1913 – 5 August 1944), was a textile worker, trade union activist, communist and anti-fascist activist born in Marseille. She was captured and executed by German occupation forces for her resistance work against them during World War II.

== Biography ==
Born in 1913 into a working-class family in Marseille, Fifi Turin worked in the spinning mills from the age of thirteen at the SA des Filatures et Tissages de Marseille, located at 21 boulevard des Vignes (now named Boulevard Fifi-Turin) in the Capelette district.

Committed to the labor movement from an early age, she used her impressive oratorical skills to promote worker solidarity. With the rise to power of the Popular Front (PCF), she actively participated in the May–June 1936 strike movement and then joined the Communist Party. An avid anti-fascist, she was also active in the World Committee of Women Against War and Fascism. She was the wife of fellow activist Laurent Turin.

After the French declaration of war against Germany on 3 September 1939, the PCF was banned, but despite that, Turin was active against the German Occupation of France. Placed under house arrest in Tarascon in November 1940 by the pro-German French government, the Vichy regime, she managed to escape. Condemned to a life in hiding, she went to Lyon, France, where she joined the French Resistance as a liaison agent in the ranks of the Francs-Tireurs et Partisans (FTP). There she used the pseudonyms "Germaine," "Hélène" and "Denise." In June 1943, she was assigned to the radio service of the clandestine French Communist Party.

Arrested by the Gestapo in July 1943, she was imprisoned and tortured in Fresnes Prison, located just south of Paris. When prison officials learned that invading Allied forces had broken through German defenses at Normandy France, and were fighting their way through German troops to liberate Paris, the Gestapo peremptorily shot the prisoners, including Turin, on 5 August 1944. The prison was liberated on 24 August 1944 by the French 2nd Armoured Division.

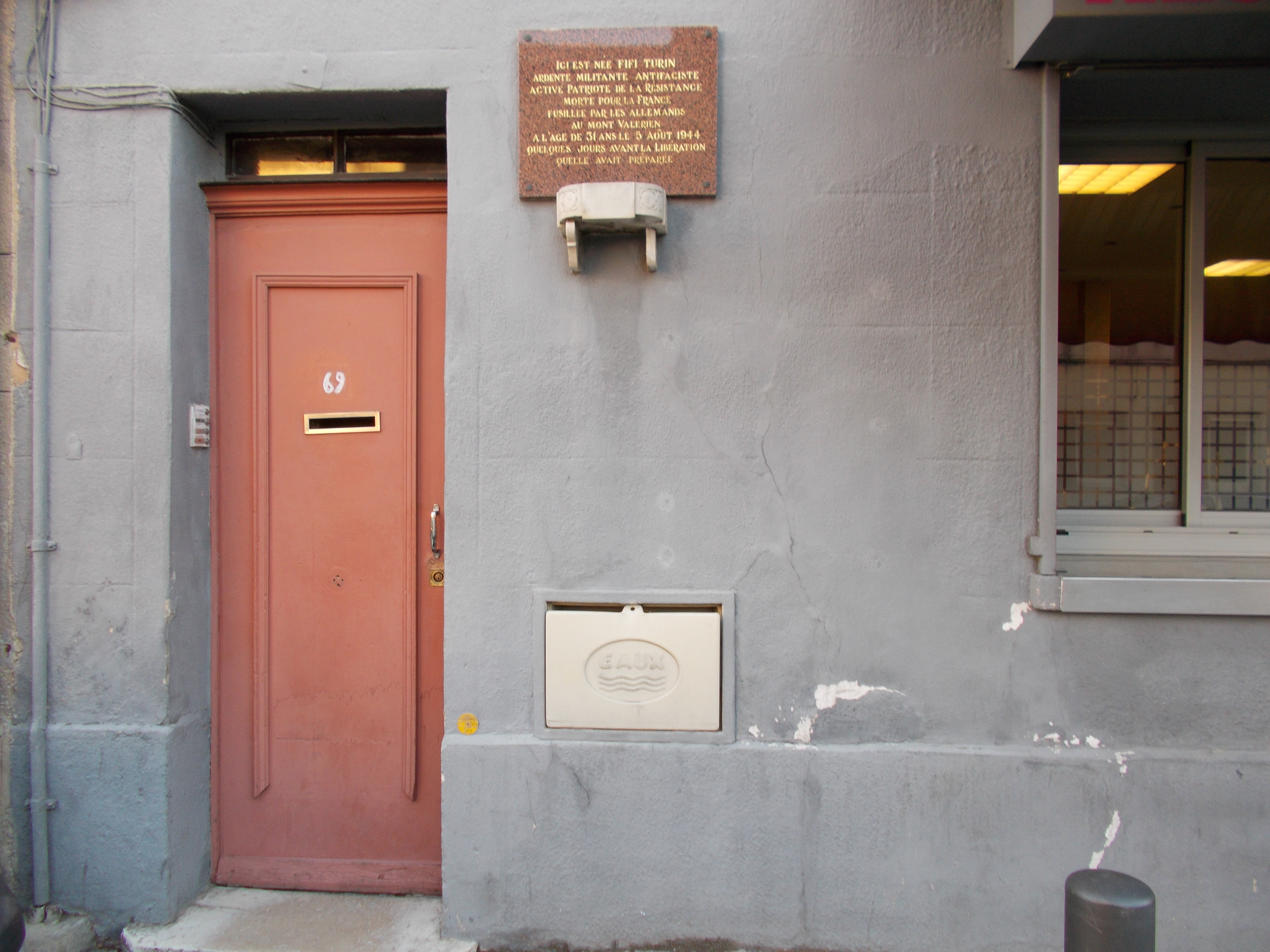
House plaque describing Fifi Turin at 69, rue des Vignes, Marseille

Fifi Turin's ashes were eventually returned to Marseille and were buried in the city's Saint-Pierre cemetery. The event became a well-attended ceremony organized by the city's Communist Party and trade union authorities.

A street in the tenth arrondissement of Marseille, Boulevard Fifi-Turin, bears her name. A plaque in her memory was placed at the beginning of the boulevard and another on the house where she lived at 69, rue des Vignes (now rue Del-Bello). Her name also appears on the memorial to the Resistance fighters of the Bouches-du-Rhône department in the military section of the Saint-Pierre cemetery in Marseille.
