= The Examination of Savonarola =

Painting by François Marius Granet

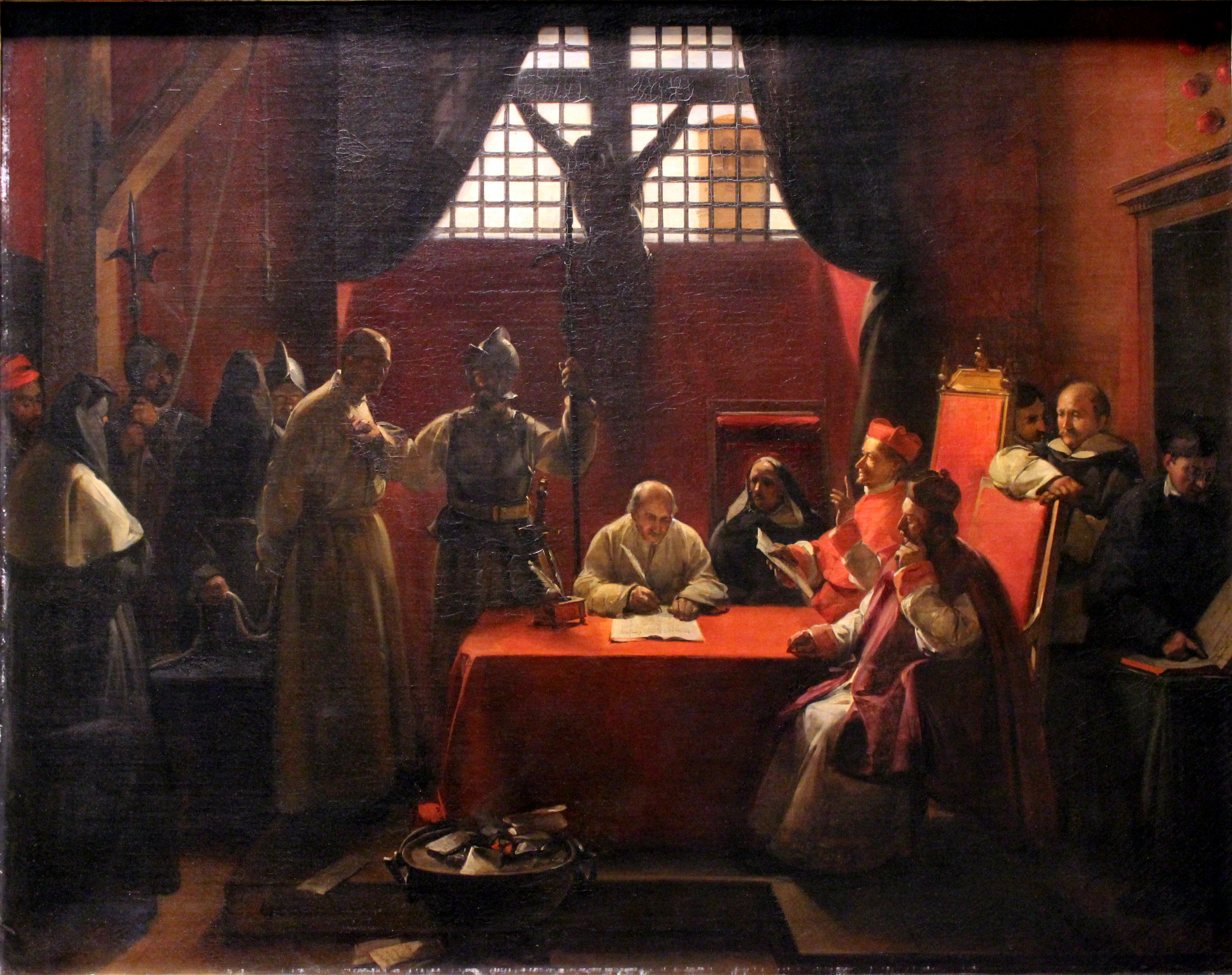
The Examination of Savonarola (1846) by François Marius Granet

The Examination of Savonarola is an 1846 oil on canvas painting by the French history painter François Marius Granet, showing the trial of Savonarola. It is now in the Musée des Beaux-Arts de Lyon.
