= Jean-Antoine Constantin =

French painter (1756-1844)

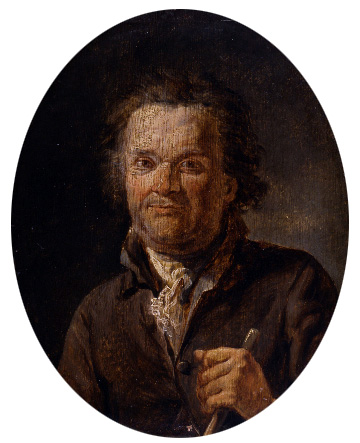
Self-portrait

Jean-Antoine Constantin (January 1756 – 9 January 1844), also known as Constantin d’Aix, was a French painter.

== Biography ==
Born near Loubières, in Marseille, Jean-Antoine Constantin studied at the Academy of Painting in Marseille under the tutelage of Jean-Joseph Kapeller, David de Marseille, and Jean-Baptiste Giry. Although born and raised in Marseille, he spent his whole professional life as a painter in Aix-en-Provence.

=== Rome, then Aix-en-Provence ===
In the aftermath of his graduation, Constantin started work in the pottery industry in Moustiers-Sainte-Marie. He then lived in Rome for six years under the patronage of Perron, an arts enthusiast from Aix. Later, he moved back to Aix to work as a painter there. He mostly did landscape painting, with Digne-les-Bains, Fontaine de Vaucluse, or Marseille as inspirations.

=== Drawing school in Aix ===
In 1786, he succeeded Claude Arnulphy and became the third principal of the drawing school in Aix, continuing in the post until the French Revolution. In 1807, he moved to Digne to work as a drawing teacher for six years. He returned to Aix in 1813, with the financial support of François Marius Granet, who gave him an allowance of 150 francs.

In January 1844, at age 88, he died a poor man.

== Influence ==
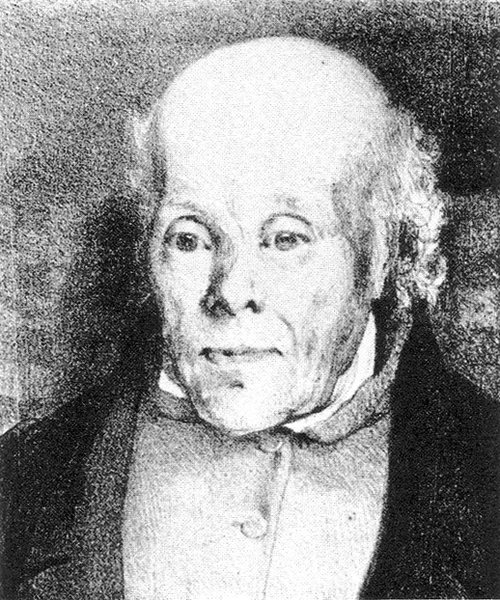
Late portrait

Constantin is seen as one of the forefathers of Provençal painting. François Marius Granet, Auguste de Forbin, Louis Mathurin Clérian, Émile Loubon are some of the later painters to have sought inspiration from his paintings.

== Works ==
- Paintings:
  - La Fontaine de Vaucluse, (Avignon).
  - Une petite Sainte-Victoire, (Aix-en-Provence).
  - Bord de rivière, Marseille.
  - L’Orage, Marseille.
  - Monastère, Marseille.
- Sepia drawings:
  - Rade de Marseille, Louvre.
  - Vue de Moustiers, Louvre.
- Feather drawing:
  - Lancement d’une montgolfière à Aix, 1784, (Marseille).
- Ink and wash painting:
  - Vue de Digne, Digne.
  - Prise du Couvent de la Sainte-Enfance, Digne.
  - Vue de la ville d’Aix, Louvre.
  - Vue de Marseille, Louvre.
  - Bord de rivière, (Marseille).
  - Vue de Salon, (Marseille).
  - Les Ermites, (Marseille).
  - L’Aumône devant l’église, (Marseille).
  - Neuf scènes paysannes ou marines d’Italie, (Aix-en-Provence).
  - Panneau contenant neuf scènes villageoises d’Italie, (Aix-en-Provence).
- Watercolor painting:
  - Paysage et Guerriers, (Marseille).
- Lithography:
  - Vue de Marseille, Paris, Rittner et Goupil (c. 1830), Marseille.

== Gallery ==
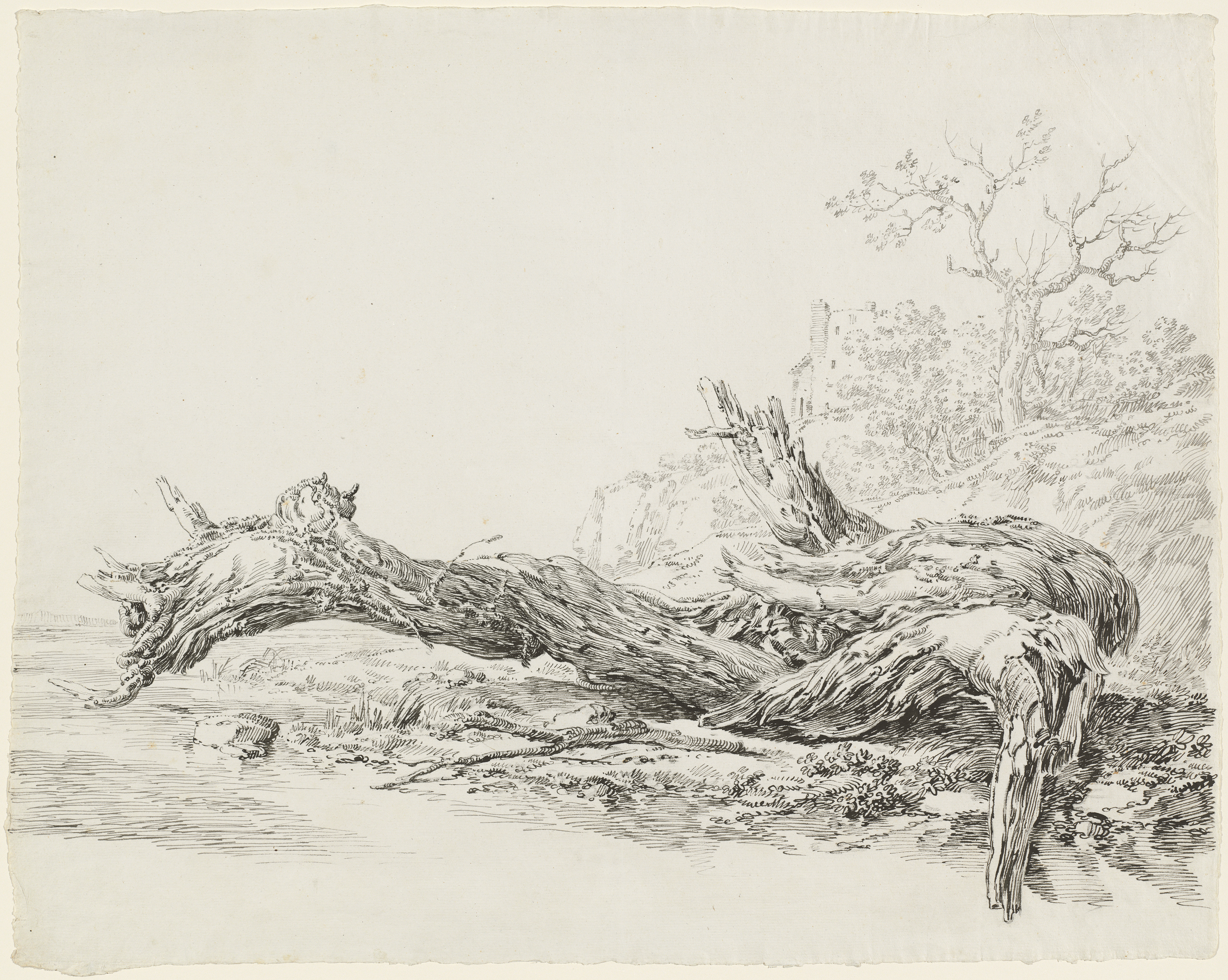
An Ancient Tree Fallen Beside a Stream, c. 1814

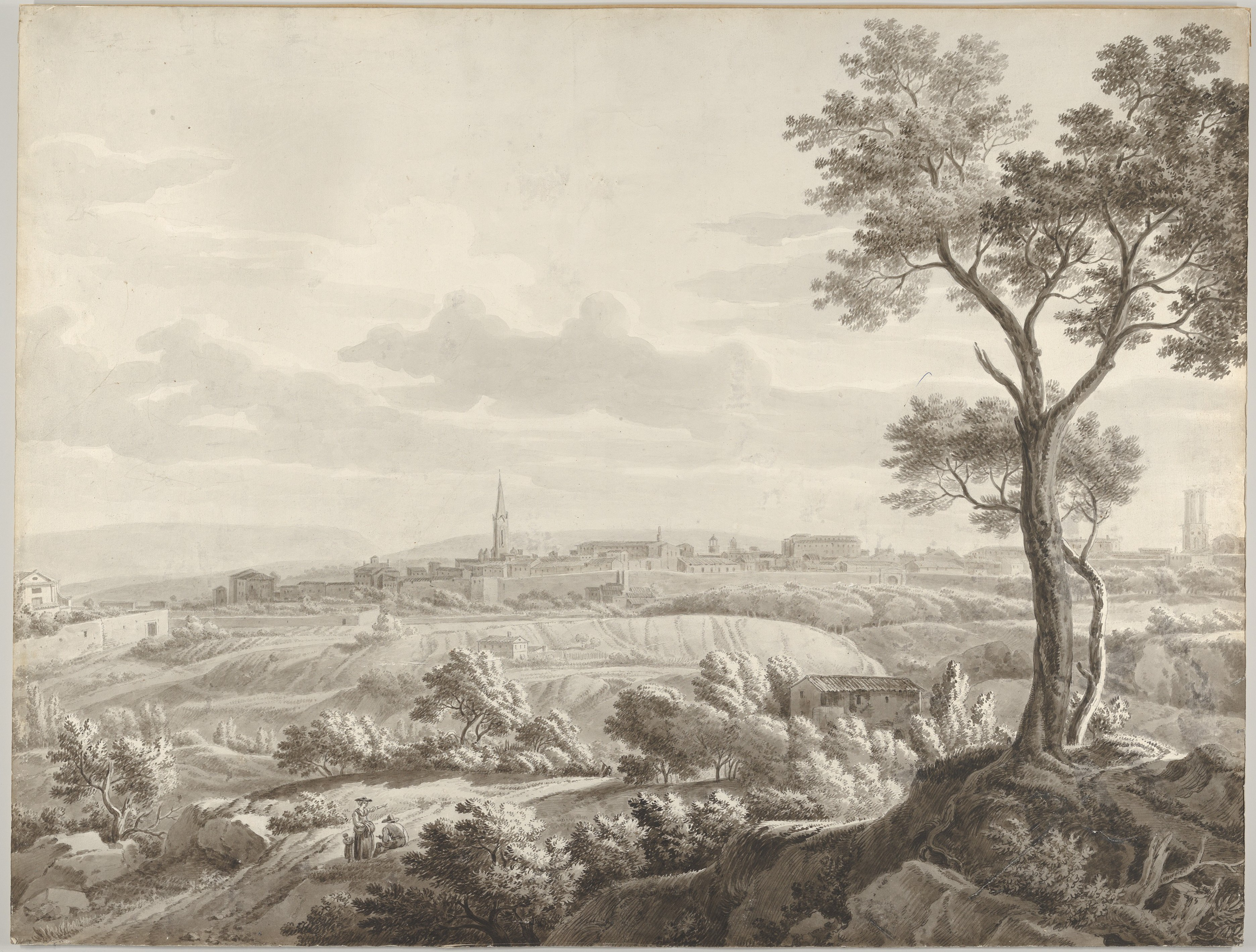
View of Aix-en-Provence

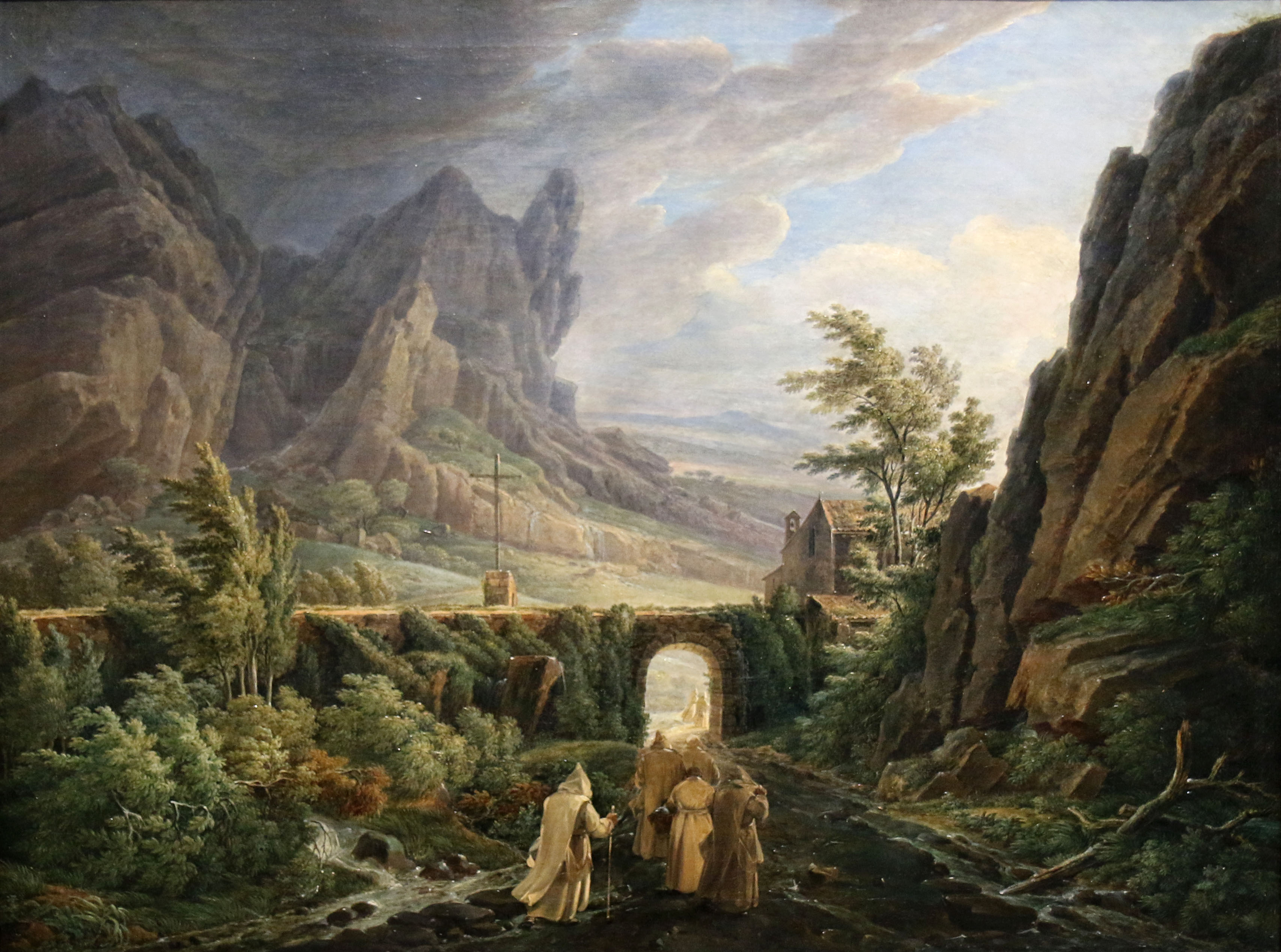
Monastère

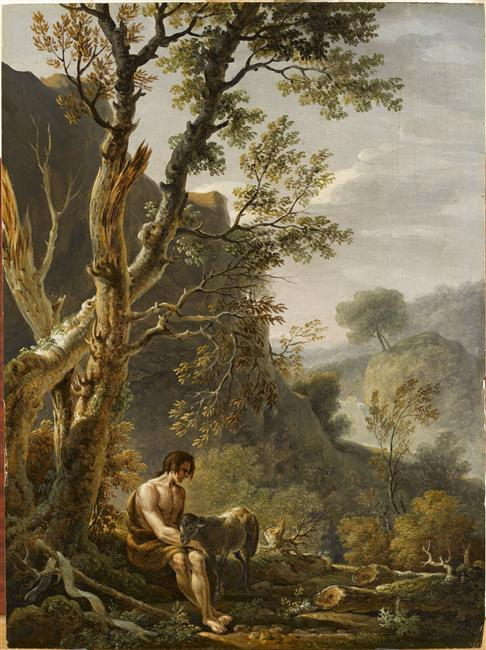
Paysage

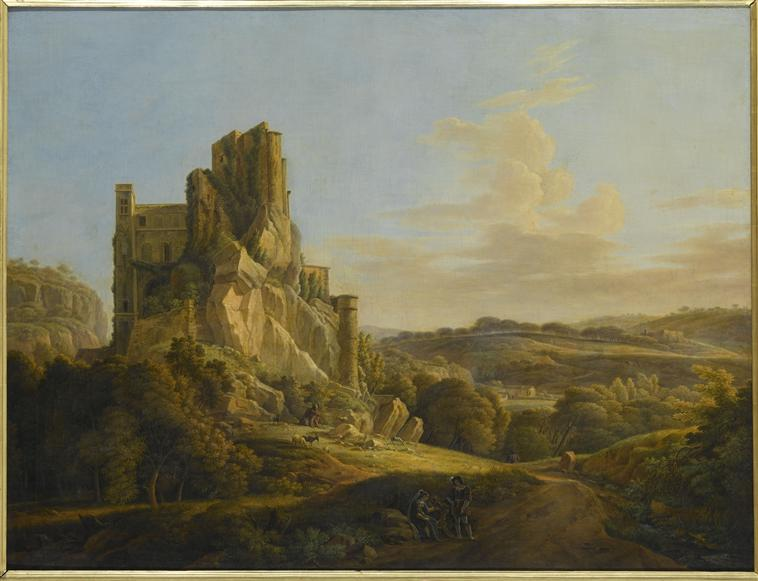
Château de la Barben

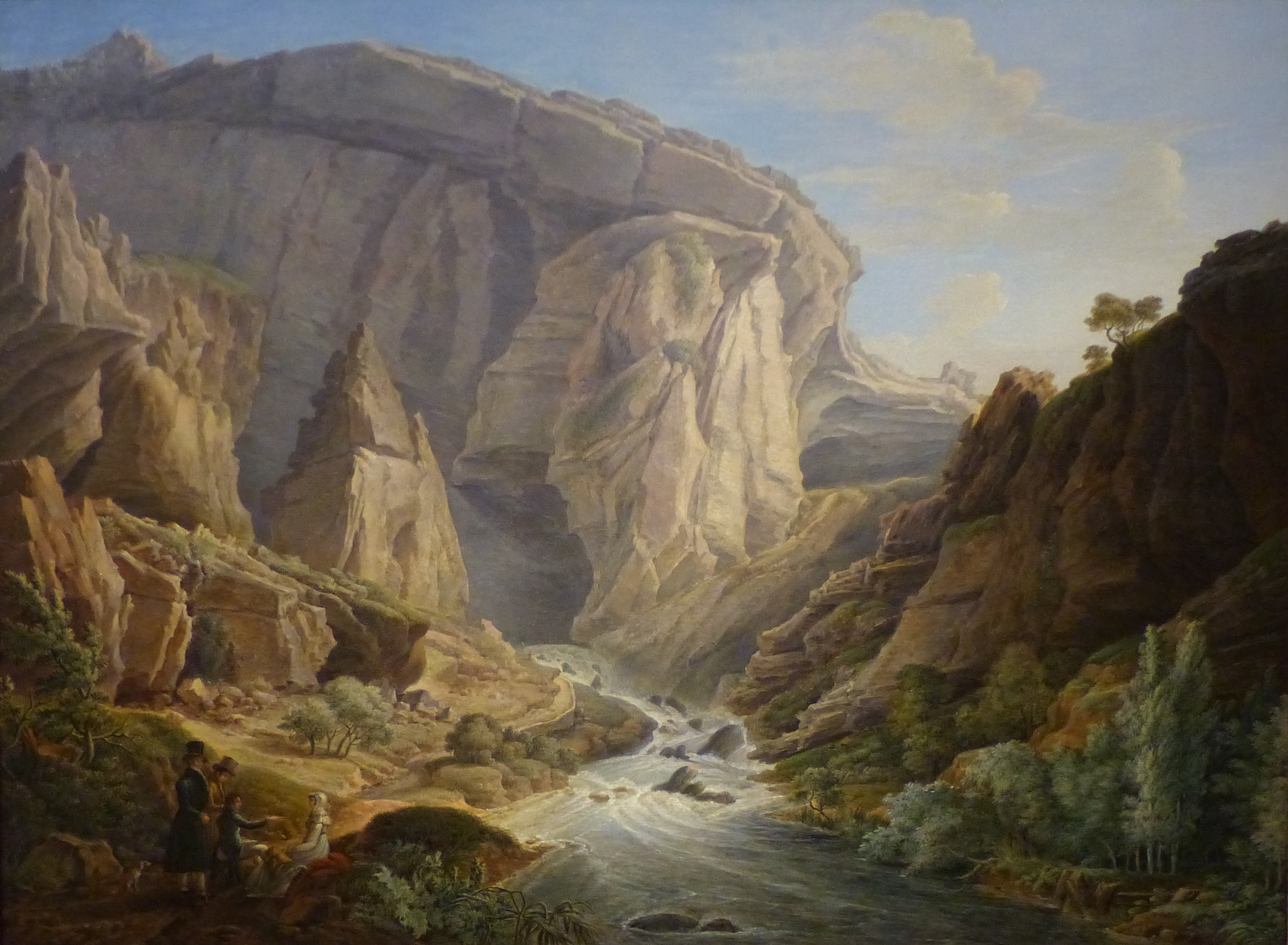
Fontaine de Vaucluse, 1823
