= Claude Arnulphy =

French painter

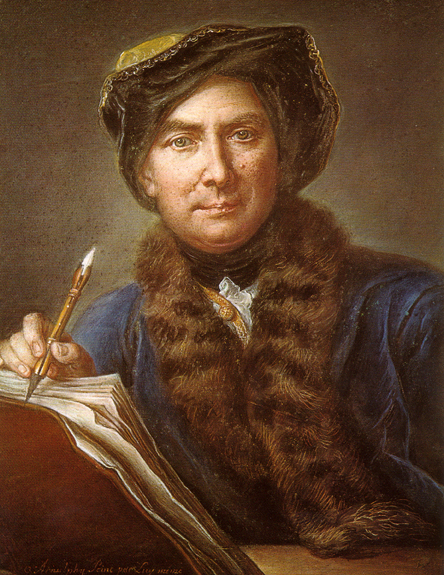
1746 portrait of Arnulphy

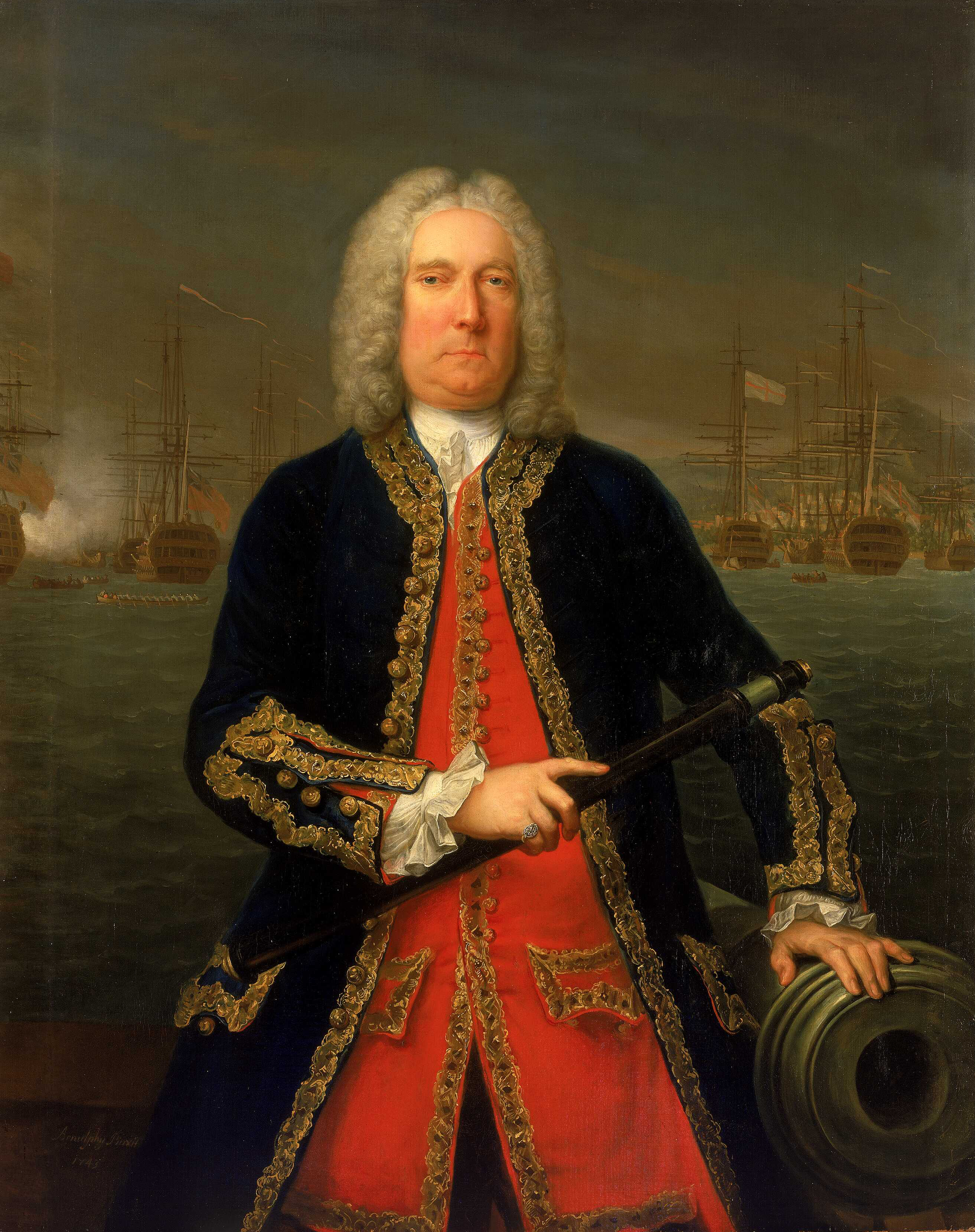
1743 portrait of Thomas Mathews by Arnulphy

Claude Arnulphy (1697 – 22 June 1786), also spelt Arnulphi was a French painter who specialised in portrait painting.

== Early life ==
Arnulphy is claimed to have been born either at Grenoble or at Lyons, but Aix is also a possibility. He was the son of Charles Arnulphy, a painter at Paris, although originally from the County of Nice in the Italian Duchy of Savoy, by his father's marriage to Madeleine Prongey, and he spent his childhood years in the French capital city. He first trained as a painter in his father's studio, then went to Rome to study under Benedetto Luti (1666–1724), becoming principally a portrait artist.

== Career ==
Arnulphy established himself in the city of Aix in about 1722, where he enjoyed a long artistic career and where many of his works survive. He was the master of Jean-François Pierre Peyron, and Antoine Gibelin (1739–1813), another native of Aix, also began to study art under Arnulphy.

His work has been compared with that of Hyacinthe Rigaud (1659–1743) and Nicolas de Largillière (1656–1746).

His portrait of Thomas Mathews (pictured) is one of four surviving portraits he painted of officers of a Royal Navy fleet lying off Toulon between 1742 and 1744. Three of these are now in the National Maritime Museum at Greenwich.

In February 1732, Arnulphy married Marguerite Aubaye, and they had ten children, of whom seven were sons. However, only one child, according to different sources a son named Joseph or François Arnulphy (died 1825) survived childhood.

In 1765, as the result of the Will of Honoré Armand de Villars, a new drawing school was established which became known as the Aix Drawing School (École de dessin d'Aix-en-Provence), with the painter Charles Marcel Aune as its first principal and Arnulphy as his deputy. In 1785, Aune resigned the headship of the school to travel to North America, and Arnulphy took over from him. However, being by then aged at least eighty-eight, he chose a successor in the shape of a much younger man, Jean-Antoine Constantin.

Arnulphy also held various other public offices in Aix, including those of syndic and treasurer. He died on 22 June 1786 and was buried the next day in the Récollets cemetery at Aix. Constantin duly succeeded him as master of the école de dessin.
