= Valère Bernard =

French painter

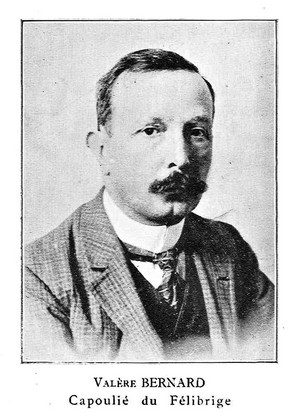
- Born: 10 February 1860; Marseille
- Died: 6 October 1936 (aged 76); Marseille
- Resting place: Cimetière Saint-Pierre, Marseille
- Education: Lycée Thiers, Marseille; École des beaux-arts, Marseille; École nationale supérieure des Beaux-Arts, Paris
- Occupations: Poet, artist
- Writing career
- Language: Occitan
- Period: 1883–1936
- Notable works: La Legenda d'Esclarmonda, Lugar

Valère Bernard (Occitan: Valèri Bernard; 10 February 1860 – 6 October 1936) was a Provençal painter, engraver, novelist and poet, writing in the Occitan language. He left an important body of graphic work, and his works continued to be published after his death.

== Biography ==
He was born in Marseille, though his family came originally from Avignon. At the age of 15 he entered the École des beaux-arts, Marseille, to study under Joanny Rave (1827–1887). Accepted by the École des beaux-arts, Paris, he was taught by Alexandre Cabanel and Pierre Puvis de Chavannes.

In 1896 his discovery of Félicien Rops immediately influenced his style of engraving and themes. He became friends with Alfons Mucha, who introduced him to the lithographic poster. Back in Marseille, his first exhibitions were greeted by critics with praise for his talent both in etching and in painting. Among other things, he produced a series of engravings entitled Guerro (1893-1895), variations around the theme of death, of great graphic intensity, inspired by Francisco Goya.

He then became friends with members of the Félibrige, a literary and cultural association dedicated to promoting the Occitan language of Provence, and composed his first poems in the Marseilles dialect, and then a work of fiction in which he showed all his sensitivity and his compassion for the humble and marginalized. He was elected majoral of the Félibrige in 1894, then Capoulié (chief) from 1909 to 1919. He proved to be in favour of a revival of the Occitan language in all its linguistic varieties, and composed, in a language which he developed to unify the Occitan and Catalan tongues, first Lugar, conte magic, and then La Legenda d'Esclarmonda which was published a few months before his death at the age of 76.

From 1930 to his death he was president of the Société d'études occitanes. On 22 March 1903 he was elected to the Académie de Marseille.

Valère Bernard is buried in the Cimetière Saint-Pierre, Marseille.

== Major works ==
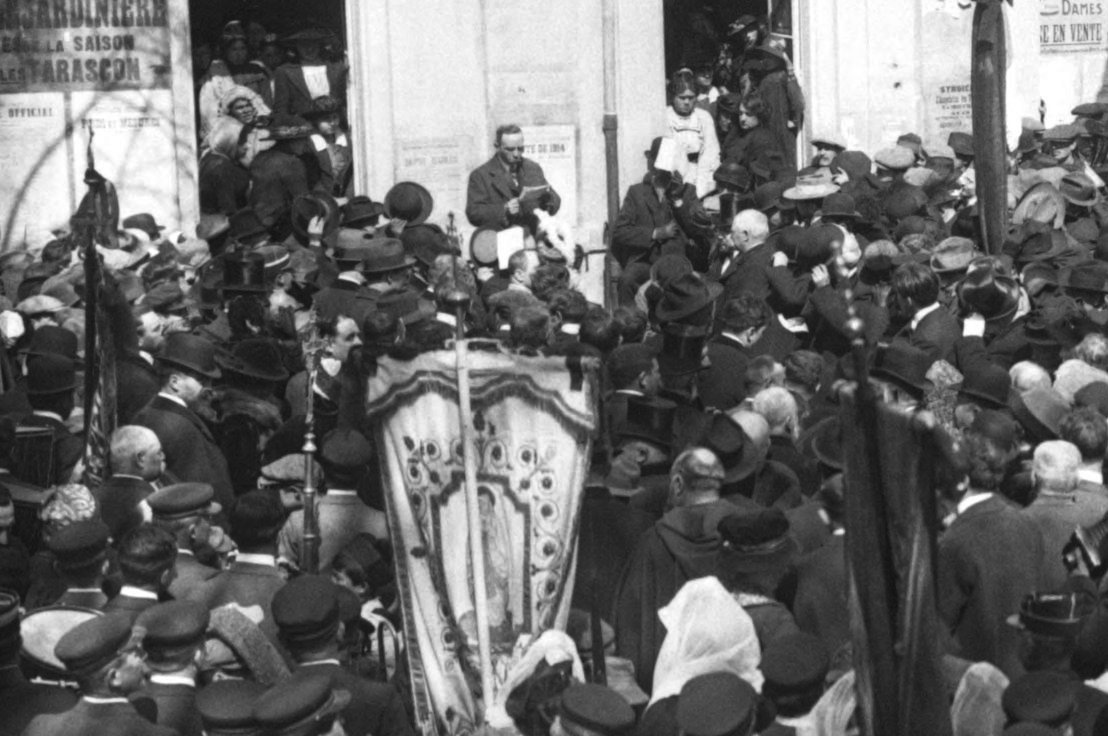
Valère Bernard delivering a speech at the burial of Frédéric Mistral

- Li Ballado d'Aram [Les Ballades d'Airain] (1883). With French translation.
- Li Cadarau [Les Charniers] (1884). With French translation.
- Guerro (1893). 11 etchings, each illustrating one stanza of verse.
- Bagatouni (1894).
- La Pauriho: poèmes et eaux-fortes (1899). With French translation.
- Long la mar latino: vesien (1908). With French translation.
- Lei Bóumian (1910).
- L'Aubre en flour: pouësio (1913)
- Lugar: conte magic (1935). With French translation.
- La Legenda d'Esclarmonda (1936)

Posthumous publications

- La Feruno (1938)
- Lindaflor, rèina dels somnhes: poème (1938). With French and Rodanenc translations.
- Letanìo: pouesio (1946). With French translation.
- Histoire de Herchies (1953)
- La Légende de Jean de l'Ours: poèmes et eau-forte (1974). With French translation.
- Mémoires: lettres au Docteur René Veuve (1978)
- Jouglar felibre: Valère Bernard (1982). With French translation.
- Dans le monde des rêves (1986)
- Proumié e darrié pouèmo de sa vido: emé un retra grafoulougico (1986)
- Ienoun (1987). Uncompleted poem.
- Fragments du cours d'esthétique de Valère Bernard à l'Ecole des beaux-arts de Marseille (1989)
- Angèlo Dàvi: rouman (1996). With French translation by Georges Ricard.

== Gallery ==
Paintings and drawings of Valère Bernard

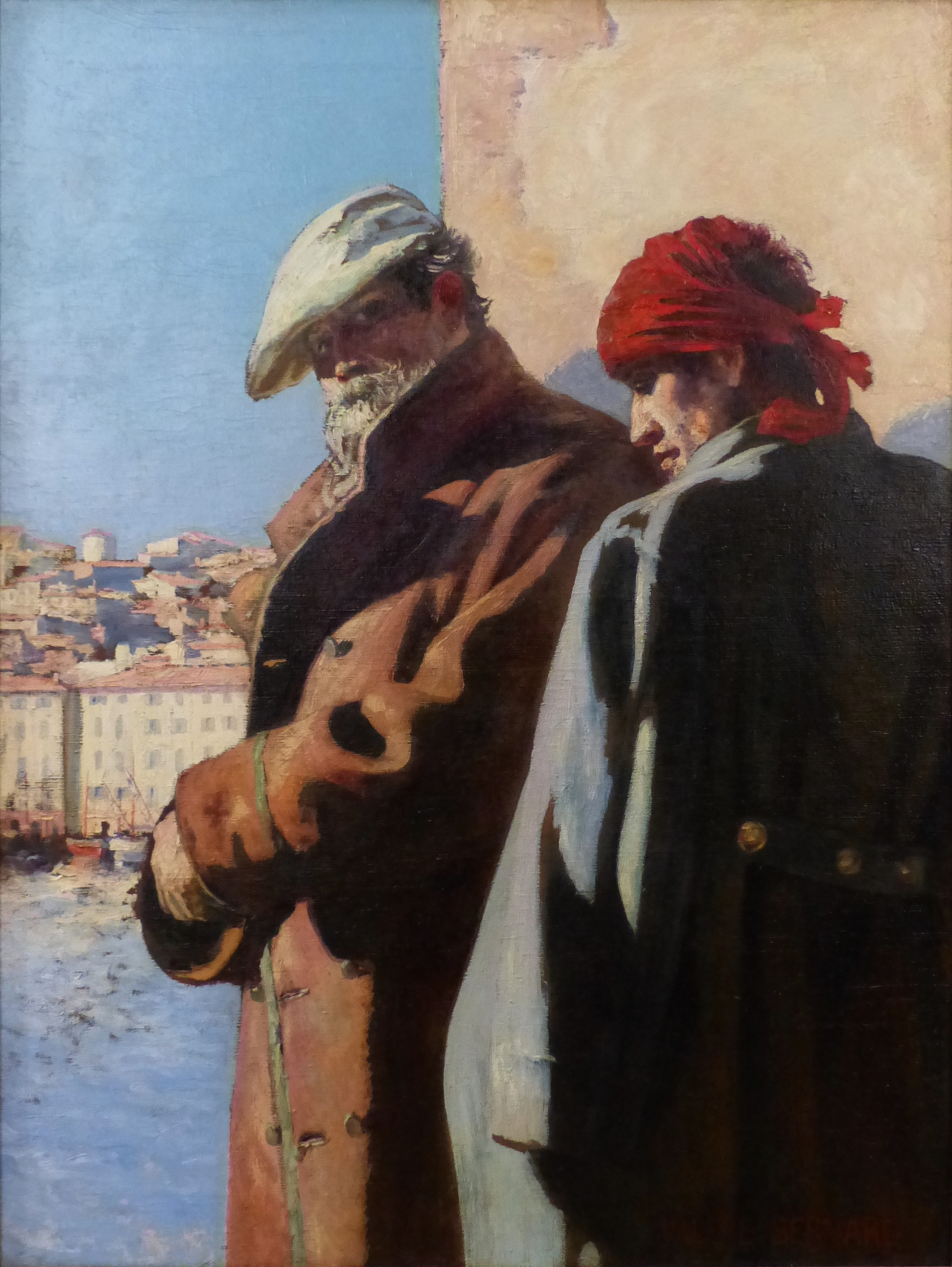
Au soleil, Musée des beaux-arts de Marseille

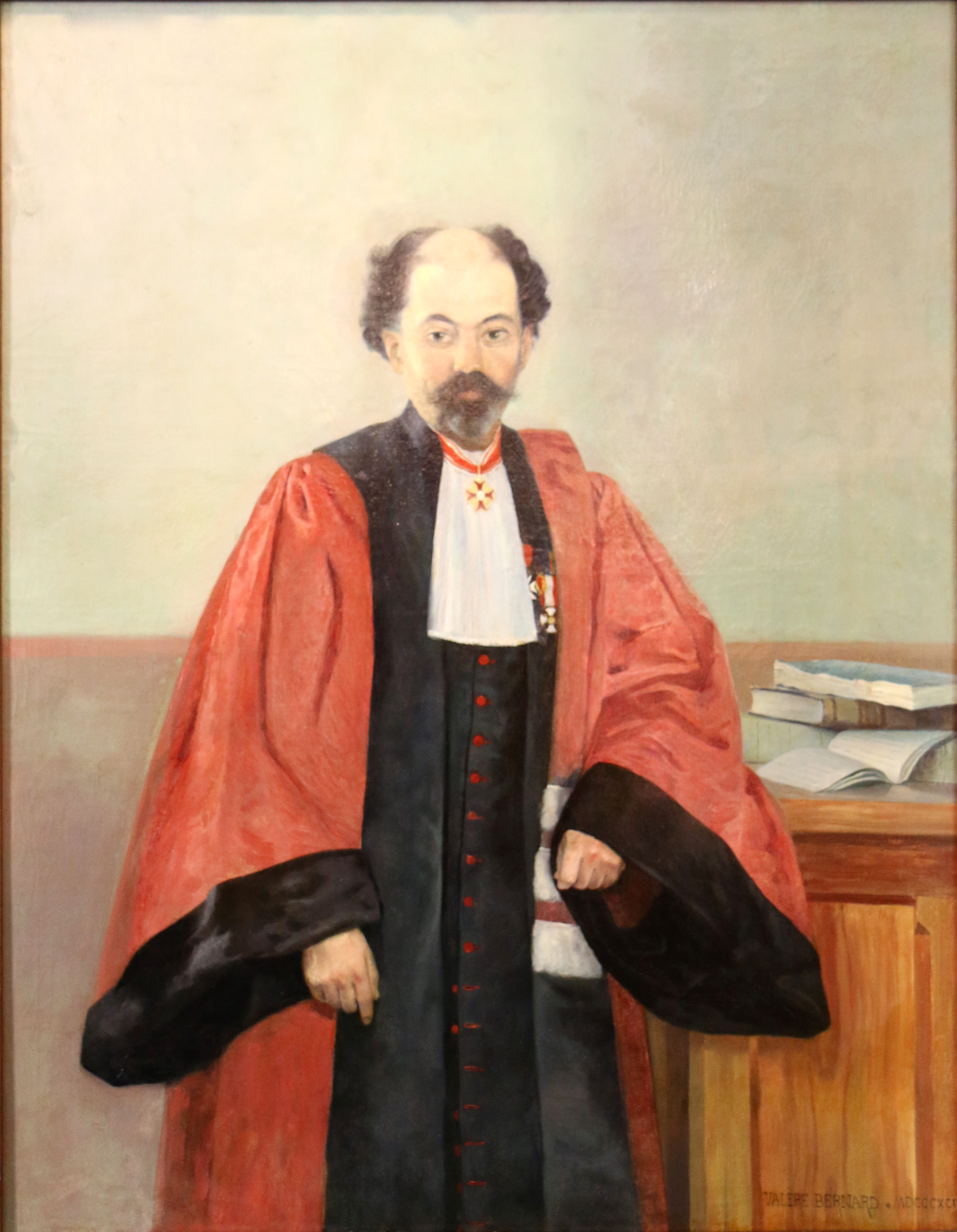
Portrait d'Auguste Fortuné Marion

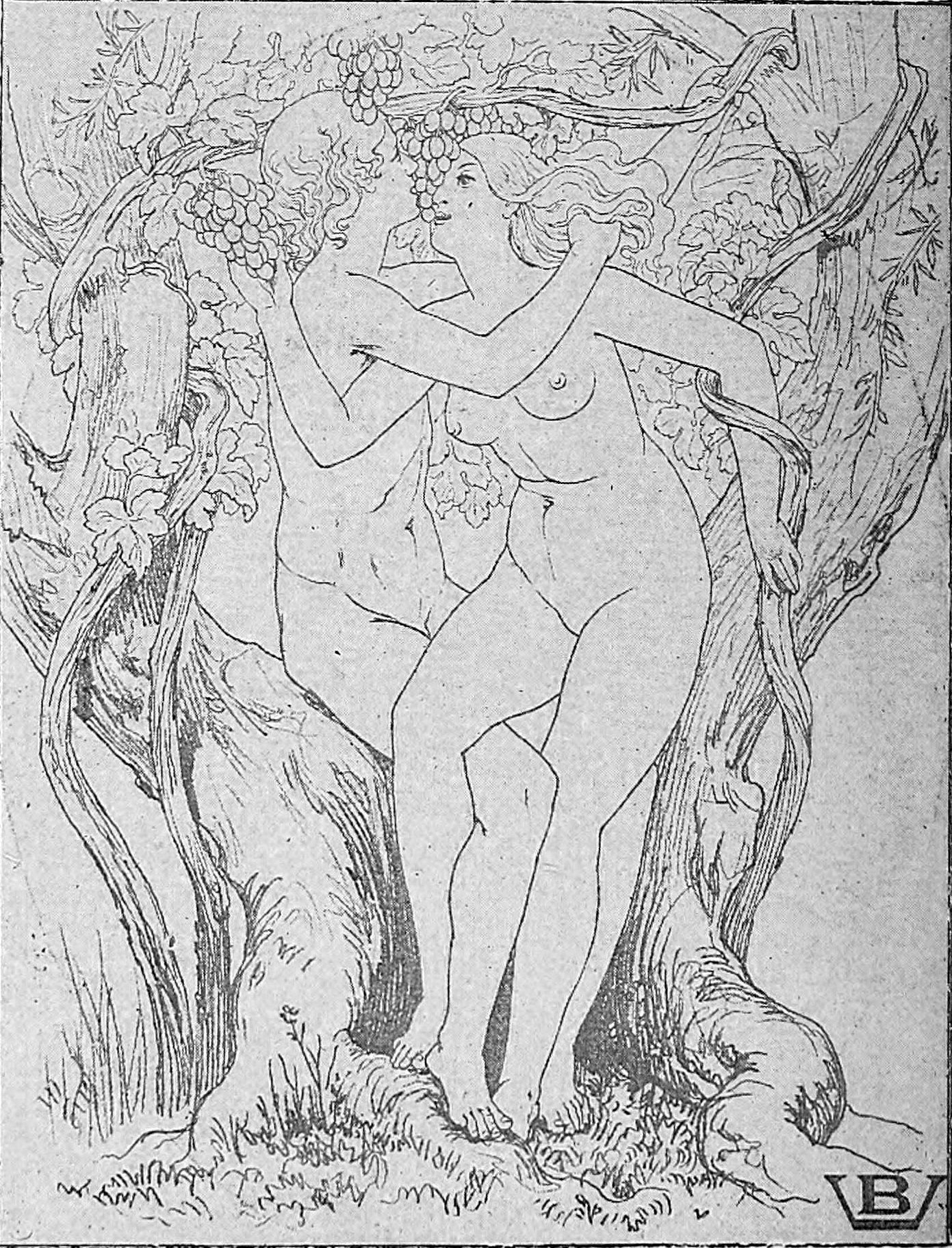
La Vigne

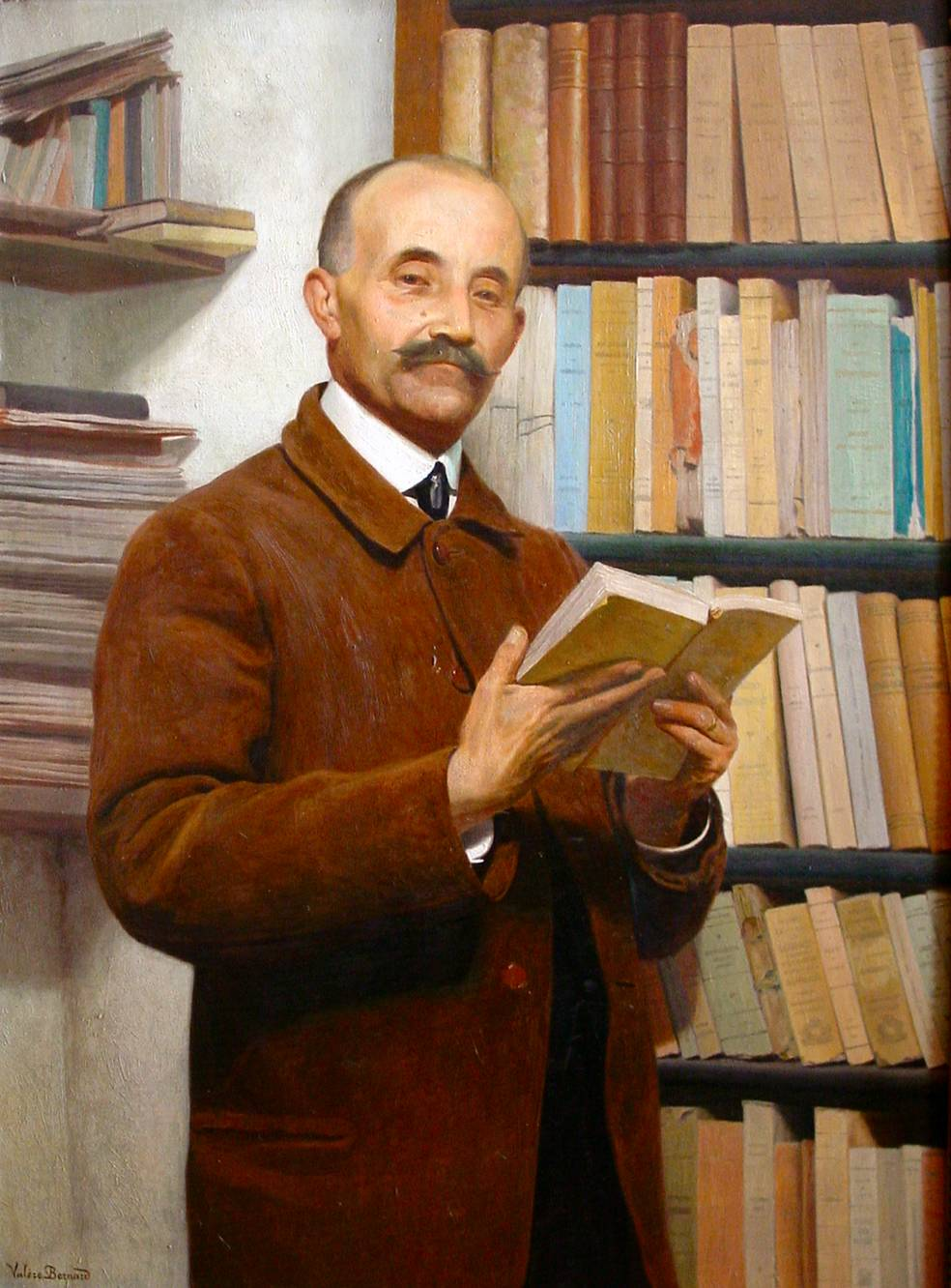
Portrait de Paul Ruat

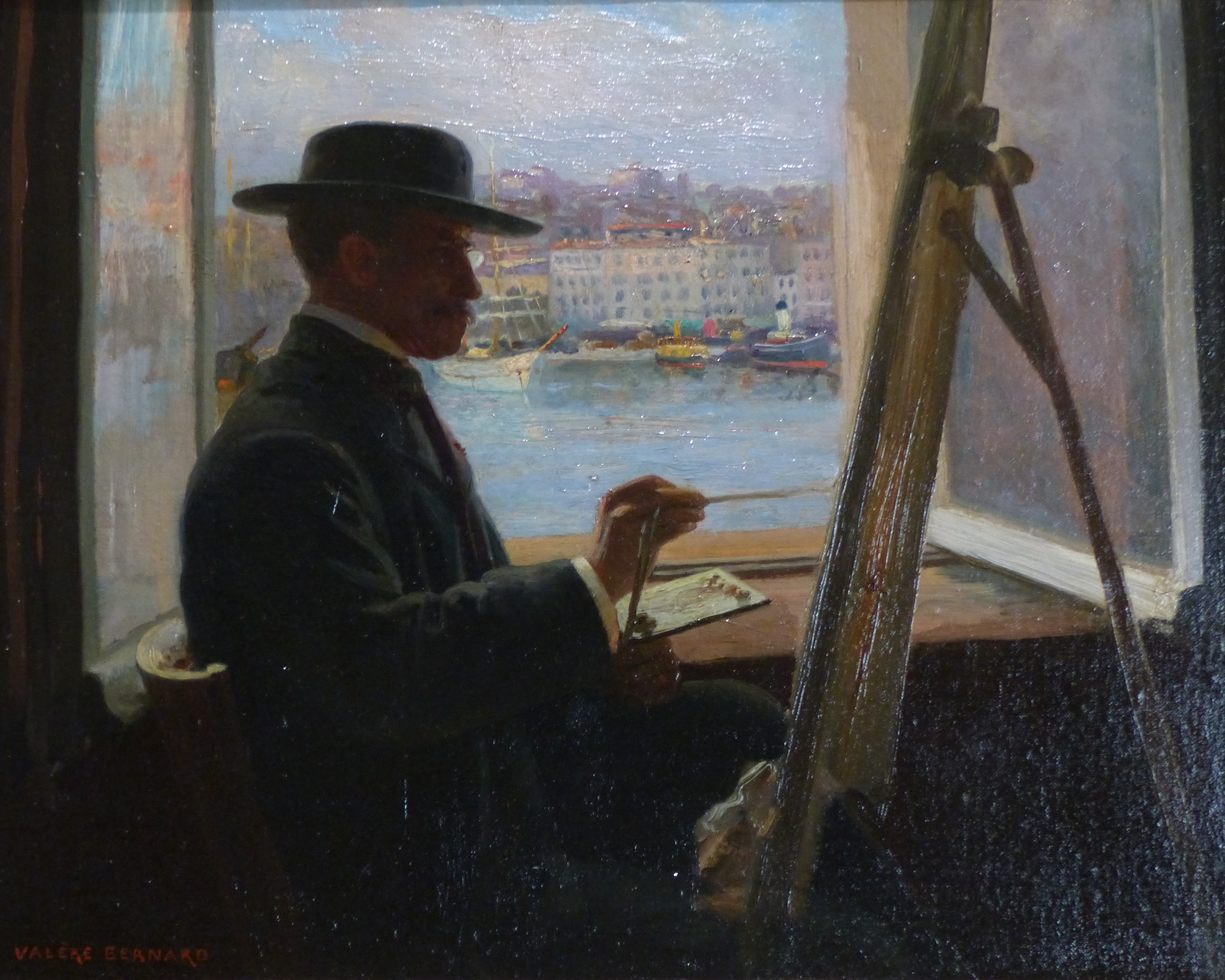
Jean-Baptiste Olive dans son atelier, Musée des beaux-arts de Marseille
