= Joseph-Marius Cabasson =

French painter (1841–1920)

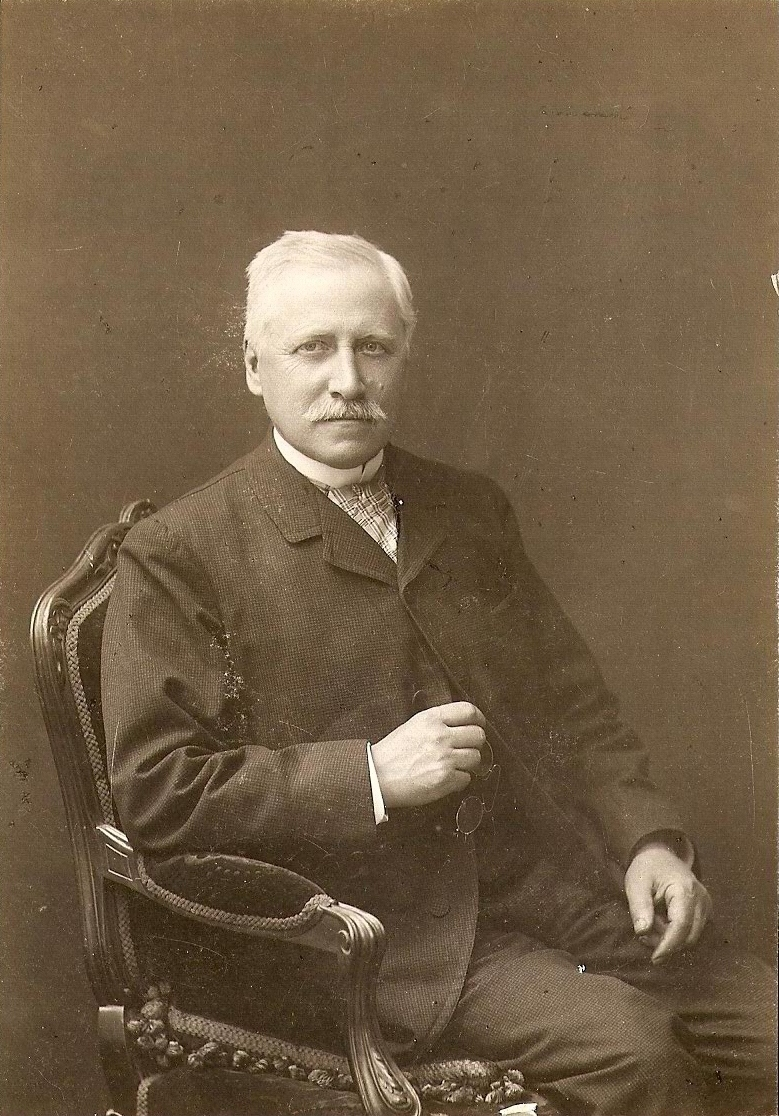
Joseph-Marius Cabasson (date unknown)

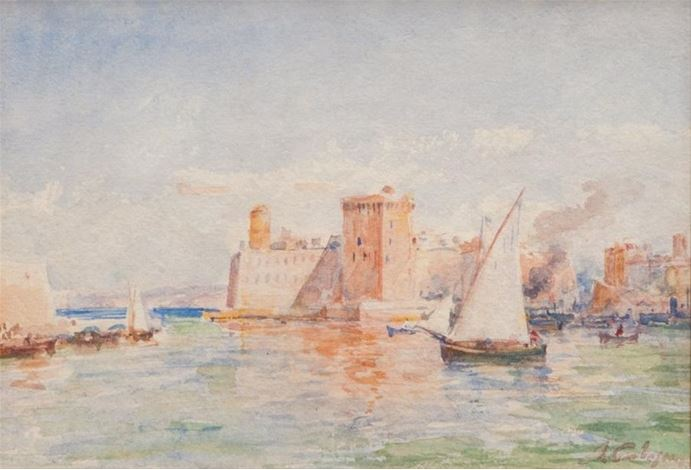
Sailboat Leaving the Old Port of Marseille

Joseph-Marius Cabasson (20 December 1841, Marseille - 4 August 1920, Marseille) was a French painter and watercolorist.

== Biography ==
He was born to a long-established Provençal family that operated a mill. His mother died giving birth to him. He initially attended a boarding school, then received his secondary education at the Collège Belzunce. He first displayed an aptitude for art there, which was encouraged by his drawing teacher. After completing his studies, he was admitted to the École des Beaux-arts de Marseille. During his time there, the school's Director, Émile Loubon, took a special liking to him and helped promote his burgeoning career. He was already working as a teacher before he graduated.

His first exhibit at the Salon came in 1865. That same year, he produced a large "Resurrection of Lazarus" for the church in Cadolive. A series of well-received exhibitions followed. Despite these successes, he resisted living in Paris. According to one of his fellow students, the sculptor André-Joseph Allar, this was due to his strong aversion for food cooked in butter rather than olive oil Whether or not this was a serious reason can only be surmised.

In 1868, he married Rose-Marie Pignatel. They would ultimately have ten children. His son, Adrien, became a priest and an amateur painter. His youngest son, Émile, was killed at the Battle of Verdun.

During the summers, he would paint en plein aire. In winter, he would not leave his studio, and used his spare time giving private lessons. He never ventured beyond the limits of Provence. He also did a great amount of volunteer work for the local Catholic churches and parishes; decorations, restorations, making posters, drawing architectural plans and the like.

In 1910, he held a major retrospective; including most of his work up to that time. He died shortly after creating a large work featuring Saint John Vianney.
