= Édouard-Auguste Imer =

French painter (1820–1881)

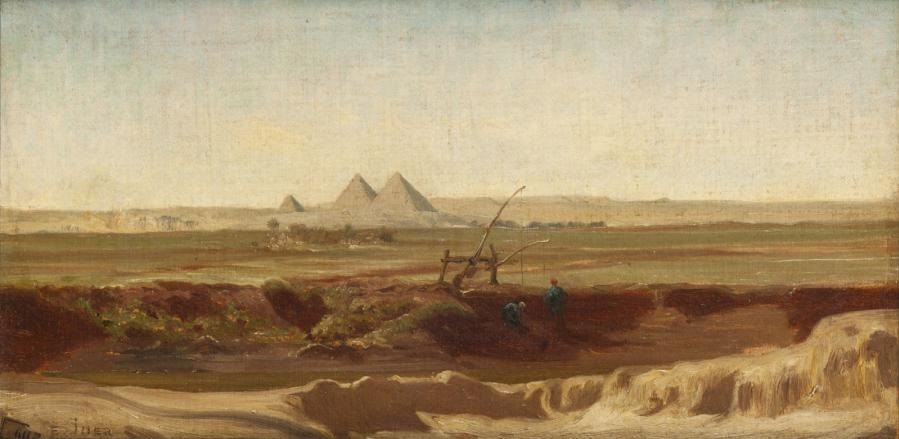
The Pyramids

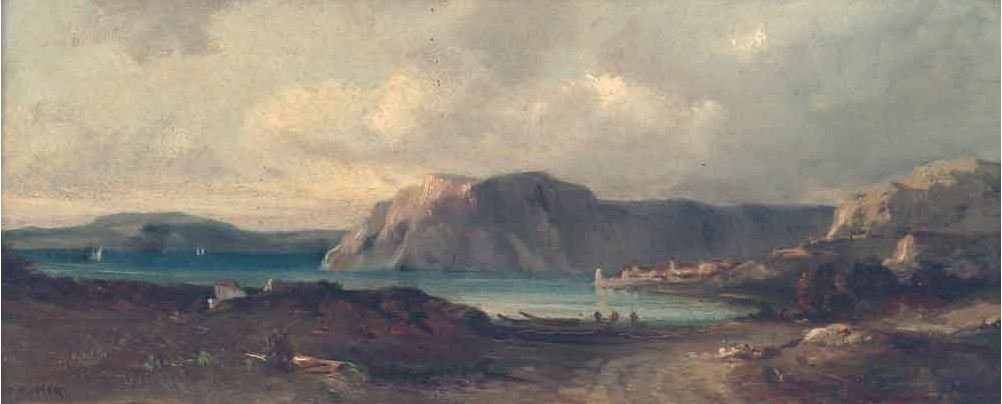
Rocky Landscape on a Bay

Édouard-Auguste Imer (23 December 1820, Avignon – 13 June 1881, Haarlem) was a French painter of Swiss ancestry. He travelled extensively, painting landscapes throughout Europe and North Africa.

== Biography ==
His father, Julien Auguste Imer (1787-1861), was a manufacturer and President of the Chamber of Commerce. He and Édouard's mother, Adèle Jeanrenaud (1790-1869), were originally from Neuchâtel. In 1846, he married Sophie Chaponnière (1822-1850), who died of a heart ailment; aged only twenty-seven. They had one daughter.

Until his wife's death, he was a partner in his father's business. Having been exposed to art since he was a boy (his father was an amateur collector), he decided to study painting with Émile Loubon at the École des Beaux-Arts de Marseille. Later, he studied in England and Germany and began exhibiting at the Salon and would be a regular contributor until 1876.

In 1849, he had made his first trip to Algeria, and became one of the first artists to paint there, rather than simply sketch. In 1853, he made an extended trip to Lazio with his friends, Ernest Hébert and Eugène Castelnau. He spent the winter of 1855 in Egypt, with Jean-Léon Gérôme, Léon Belly and Frédéric Auguste Bartholdi, who was there at the invitation of the newly formed Suez Canal Company. He apparently made several visits to Venice during this time, but his earliest known work depicting that city was in 1872. Many of his Orientalist paintings from this period are unaccounted for.

He died while working on a commission in Haarlem. He was buried there and his grave is maintained in perpetuity by a grant from the Institut de France. In 1900, a promenade was named after him in Fréjus; one of his favorite places to paint.

== Sources ==
- Edouard Imer, exhibition catalogue, Association des Artistes, January 1882
- Lynne Thornton, Les Orientalistes, peintres voyageurs (1828-1908), Art Creation Realisation, 2001 ISBN 978-2-86770-138-2
- Marion Vidal-Bué, Alger et ses peintres (1830-1960), Méditerranée, 2000 ISBN 978-2-8427-2095-7
