= Alphonse Moutte =

French painter

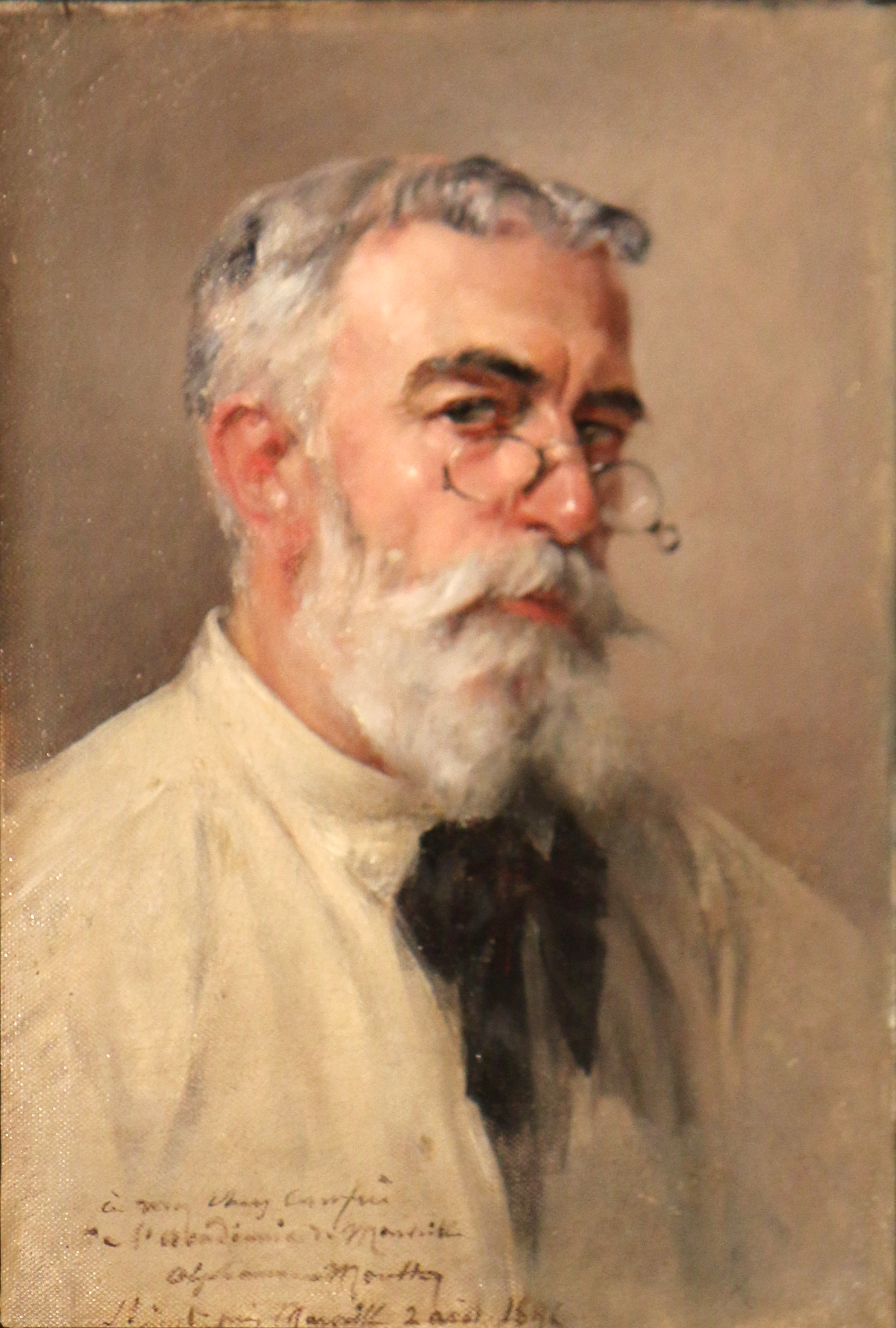
- Self-portrait, 1895
- Born: March 4, 1840; Marseille, France
- Died: April 21, 1913 (aged 73); Marseille, France
- Occupation: Painter

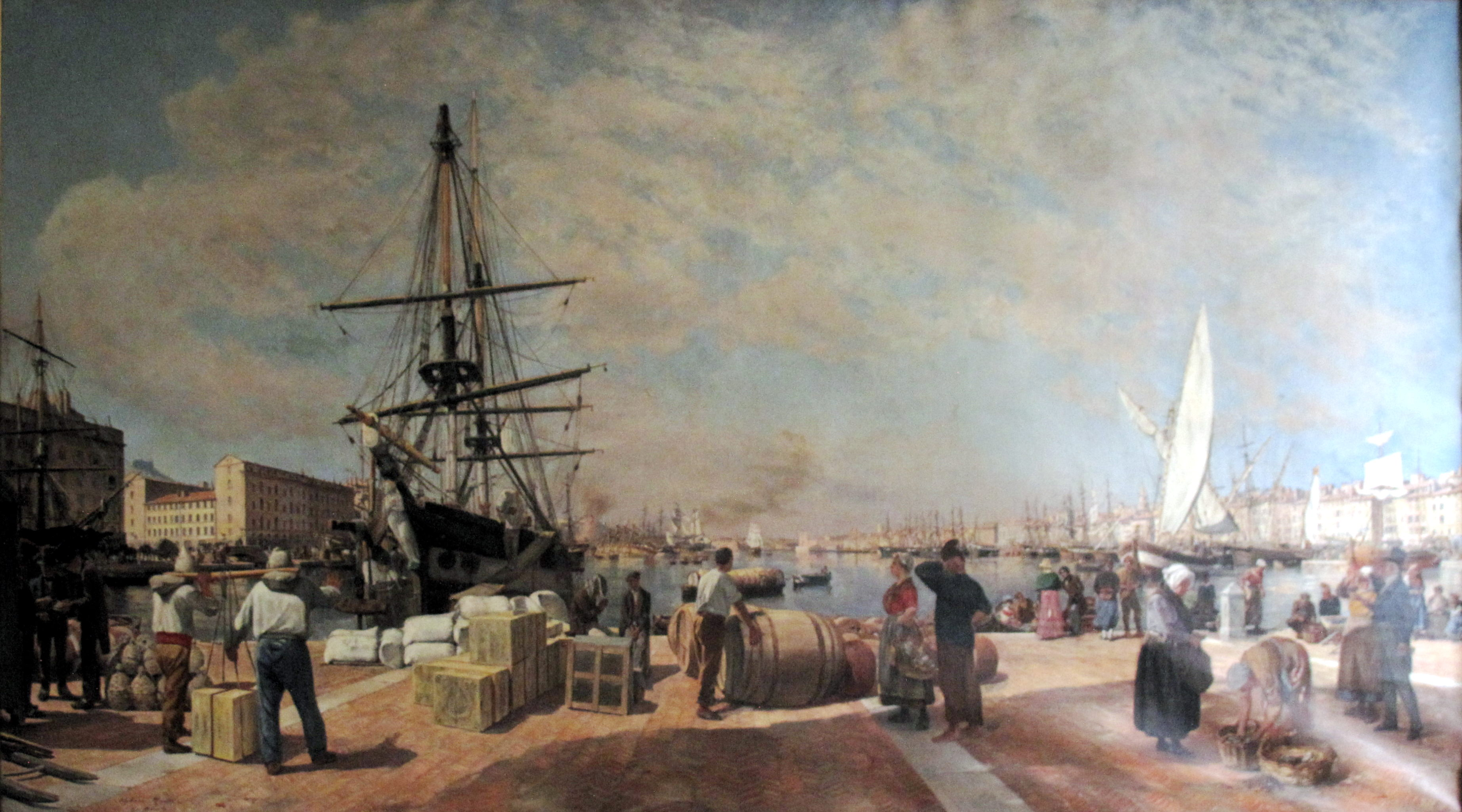
Unloading a Brig at Marseille Harbor, 1900

Jean Joseph Marie Alphonse Moutte (March 4, 1840 – April 21, 1913) was a French painter in the Naturalist style, known for his genre scenes and coastal landscapes.

== Biography ==
He was born to an old Provençal family and began his education at the Lycée Thiers. Later, he attended the École supérieure d'art et de design Marseille-Méditerranée where he studied with Émile Loubon, among others, although his family intended for him to become a wheat broker. He did, in fact, work in that capacity for several years, but decided to become a full-time artist and went to Paris to work in the studios of Ernest Meissonier. His first exhibit at the Salon came in 1869, winning medals in 1881 and 1882.

In 1866, he married Thérèse Heraud. Their daughter, Marie Thérèse, would later marry one of his students; Jean-Baptiste Samat (1865–1931).

He returned to Marseille in 1891 and, four years later, succeeded Dominique Antoine Magaud as Director of the École. He soon became a prominent personality and his works could be seen in galleries throughout Provence. He continued to exhibit at the Salon until his death. He was awarded a silver medal at the Exposition Universelle (1889) and a bronze medal at the Exposition Universelle (1900). Among his best-known students were Jean-Baptiste Olive and the sculptor Ary Bitter.

He was a good friend of Frédéric Mistral and participated in the activities of the Félibrige. In 1892, he was elected a member of the Académie de Marseille and, in 1893, became a Chevalier in the Legion of Honor. A street in the 13th arrondissement of Marseille bears his name.
