= François Marius Granet =

French painter (1775–1849)

Francois Marius Granet
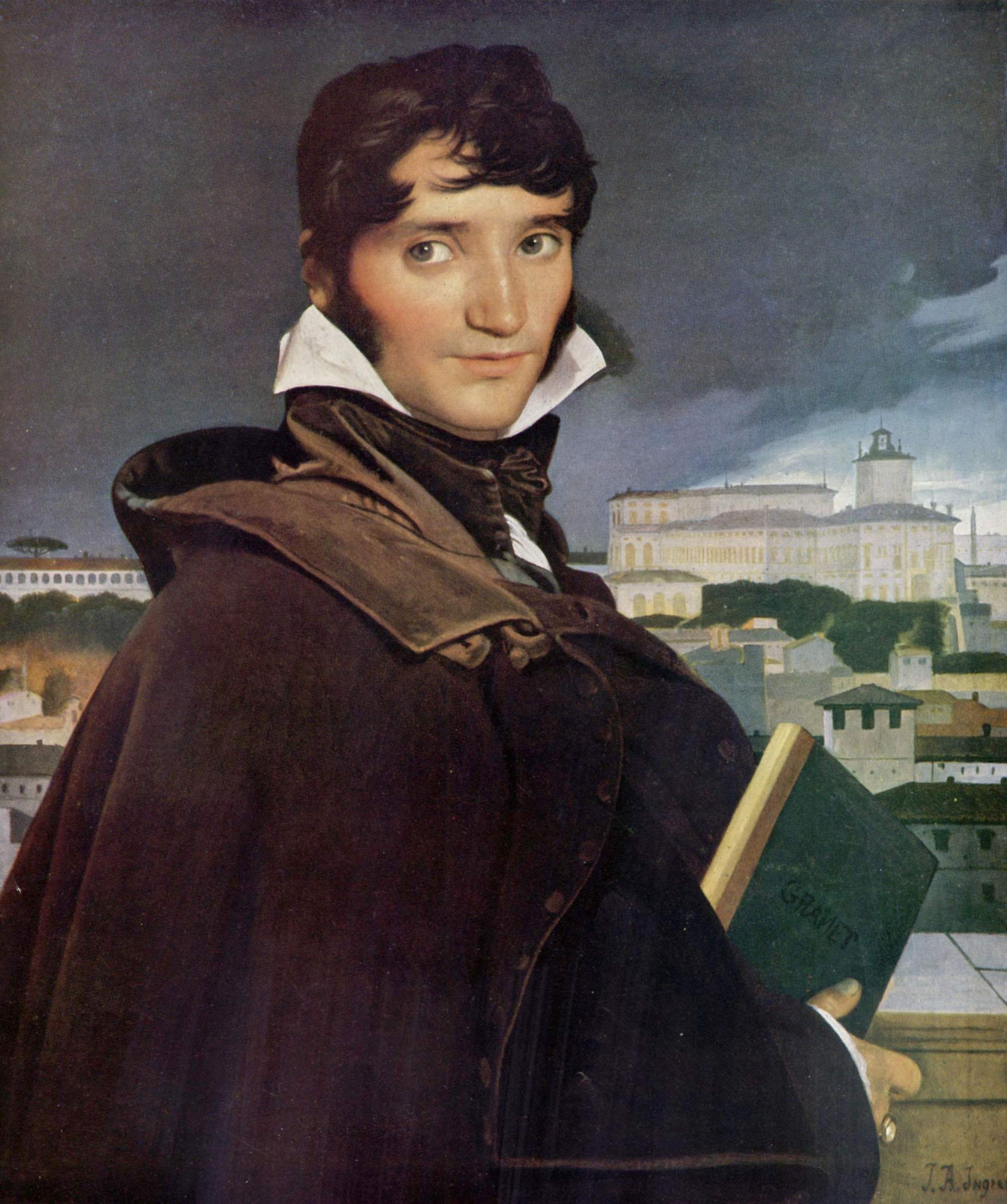
- Jean Auguste Dominique Ingres, Portrait of Granet (1809)
- Born: 17 December 1775; Aix-en-Provence, France
- Died: 21 November 1849 (aged 73); Aix-en-Provence, France
- Education: Jean-Antoine Constantin; Jacques-Louis David; Simon Denis
- Known for: Painting

François Marius Granet (French: [fʁɑ̃swa maʁjys ɡʁanɛ]; 17 December 1775 – 21 November 1849) was a French painter, primarily of architectural subjects.

== Biography ==
François Marius Granet was born on 17 December 1775 in Aix-en-Provence; his father was a small builder. As a boy, his strong desires led his parents to place him, after some preliminary teaching from a passing Italian artist, in a free school of art directed by Jean-Antoine Constantin, a landscape painter of some reputation. In 1793, Granet followed the volunteers of Aix to the siege of Toulon, where he obtained employment as a decorator in the arsenal.

As a young man in Aix, he met the young comte de Forbin, and upon his invitation Granet, in the year 1797, went to Paris. De Forbin was one of the pupils of Jacques-Louis David, and Granet entered the same studio. Later he got possession of a cell in the convent of Capuchins, which, having served for a factory of assignats during the Revolution, was afterwards inhabited almost exclusively by artists. In the changing lights and shadows of the corridors of the Capuchins, Granet found the materials for that one picture to the painting of which, with varying success, he devoted his life.

In 1802, he left Paris for Rome, where he remained until 1819. When he returned to Paris, he brought with him one of fourteen copies of his celebrated Chœur des Capucins, painted in 1811. The figures of the monks celebrating mass are taken in this subject as a substantive part of the architectural effect, and this is the case with all Granet's works, even with those in which the figure subject would seem to assert its importance, and its historical or romantic interest. Stella painting a Madonna on his Prison Wall, 1810 (Leuchtenberg collection); Sodoma à l'hôpital, 1815 (Louvre); Basilique basse de St François d'Assise, 1823 (Louvre); Rachat de prisonniers, 1831 (Louvre); Mort de Poussin, 1834 (Villa Demidoff, Florence), are among his principal works; all are marked by the same peculiarities, everything is sacrificed to tone.

In 1819, Louis Philippe decorated Granet, and afterwards named him Chevalier de l'Ordre St Michel, and Conservateur des tableaux de Versailles (1826). He became a member of the institute in 1830; but in spite of these honours, and the ties which bound him to de Forbin, then director of the Louvre, Granet constantly returned to Rome. In 1821, he presented his painting Interior view of the choir in the Church of the Capuchin monastery in the Piazza Barberini in Rome to Alexander I of Russia. In 1834, Granet was elected an honorary associate of the Imperial Academy of Arts.

After 1848, he retired to Aix, immediately lost his wife, and died himself on 21 November 1849. He bequeathed the greater part of his fortune to his native town and all his collections (including the very fine portrait by Ingres from 1809) to the Museum of Aix-en-Provence, which was renamed the Musée Granet in 1949, the centenary of his death.

== Gallery ==
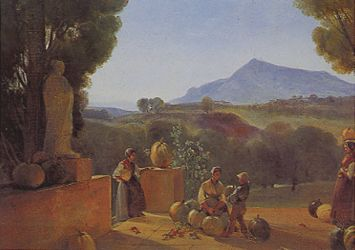
La Récolte des citrouilles à la Bastide de Malvalat (1796)
(Musée Granet, Aix-en-Provence)

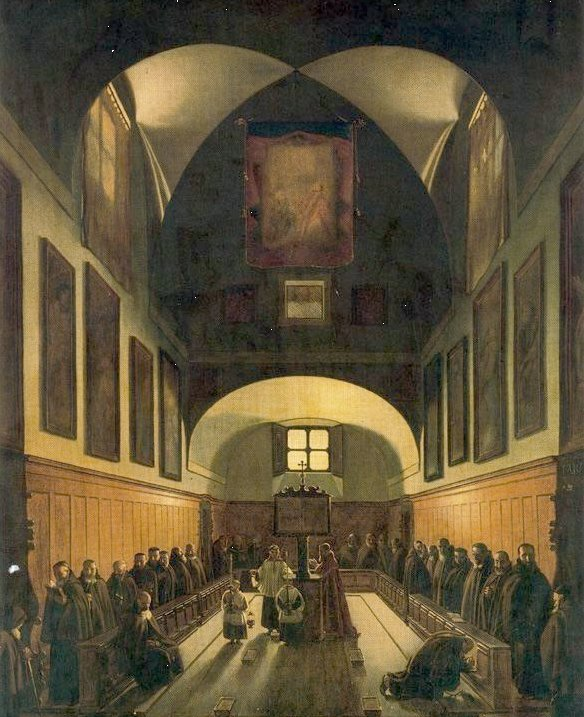
Le Chœur de la Chapelle des Capucins à Rome (1808)

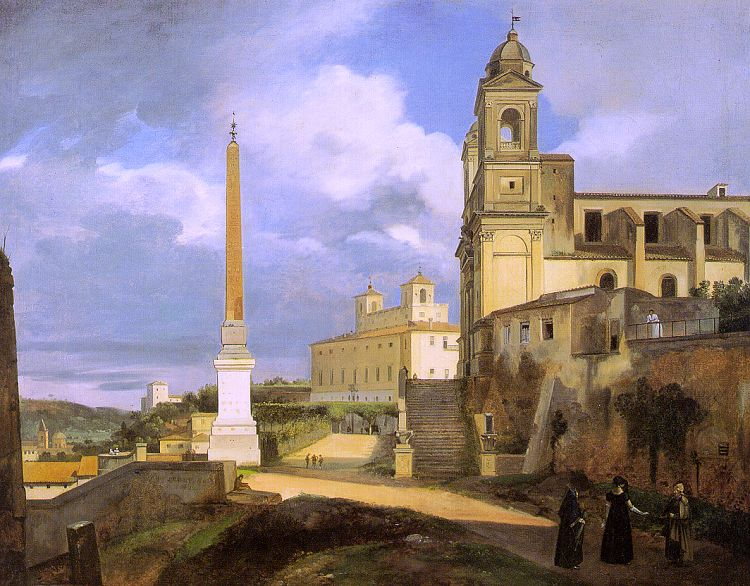
La Trinité-des-Monts et la Villa Médicis, à Rome (1808)
(Musée du Louvre, Paris)

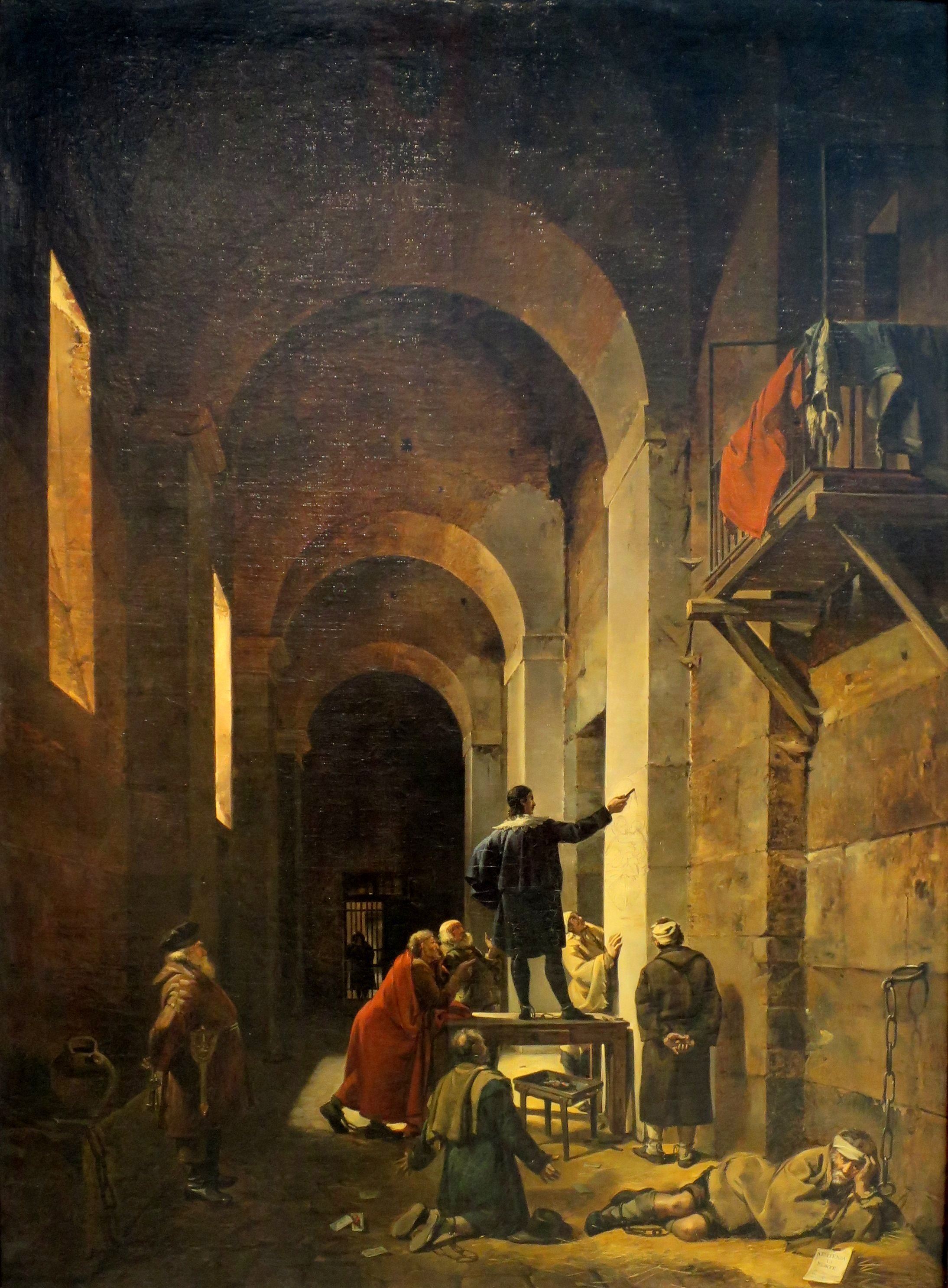
Stella in Prison (1810)
(Pushkin Museum, Moscow)

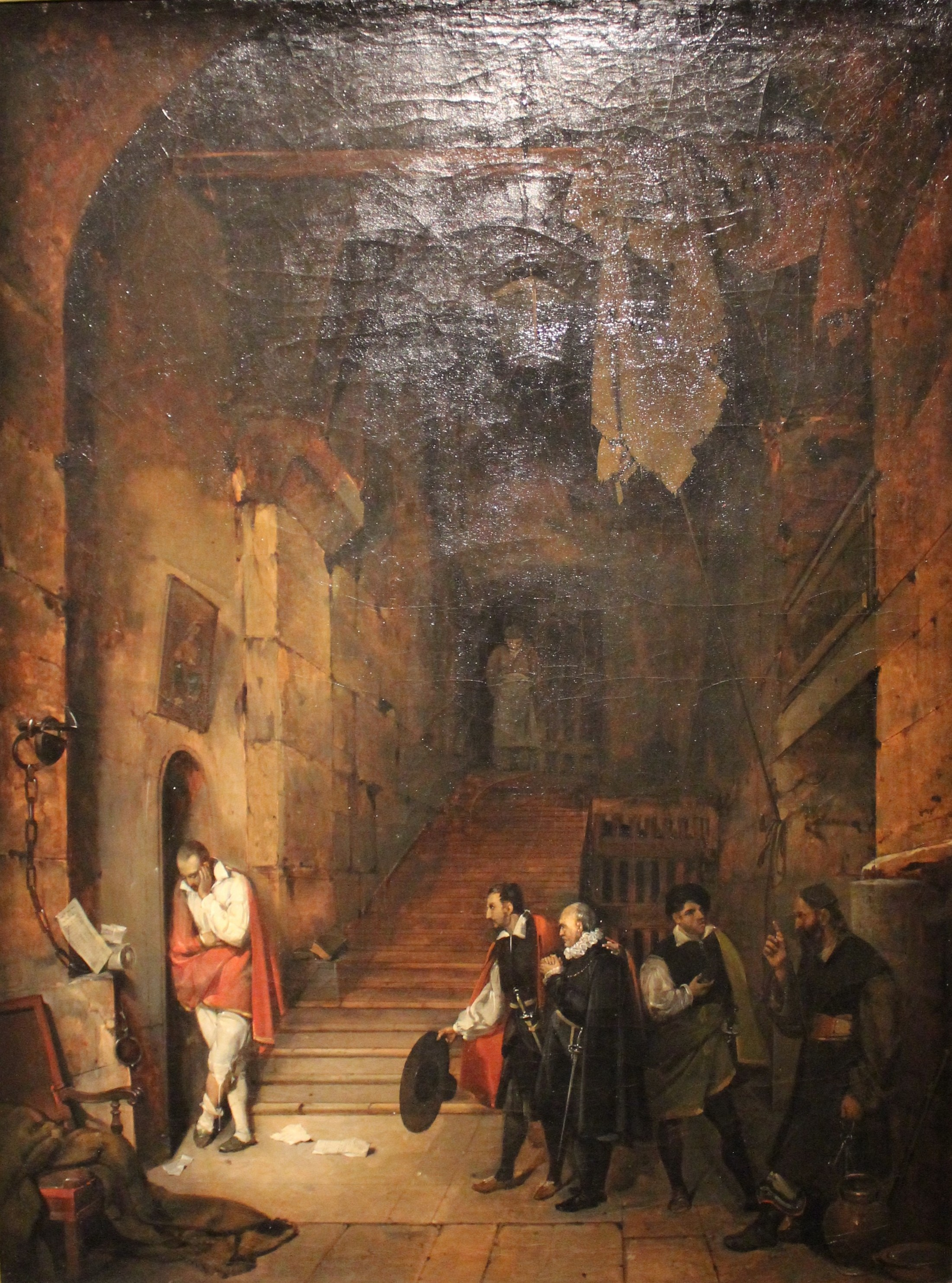
Montaigne Visiting Torquato Tasso in Prison (1820)
(Musee Fabre, Montpellier)

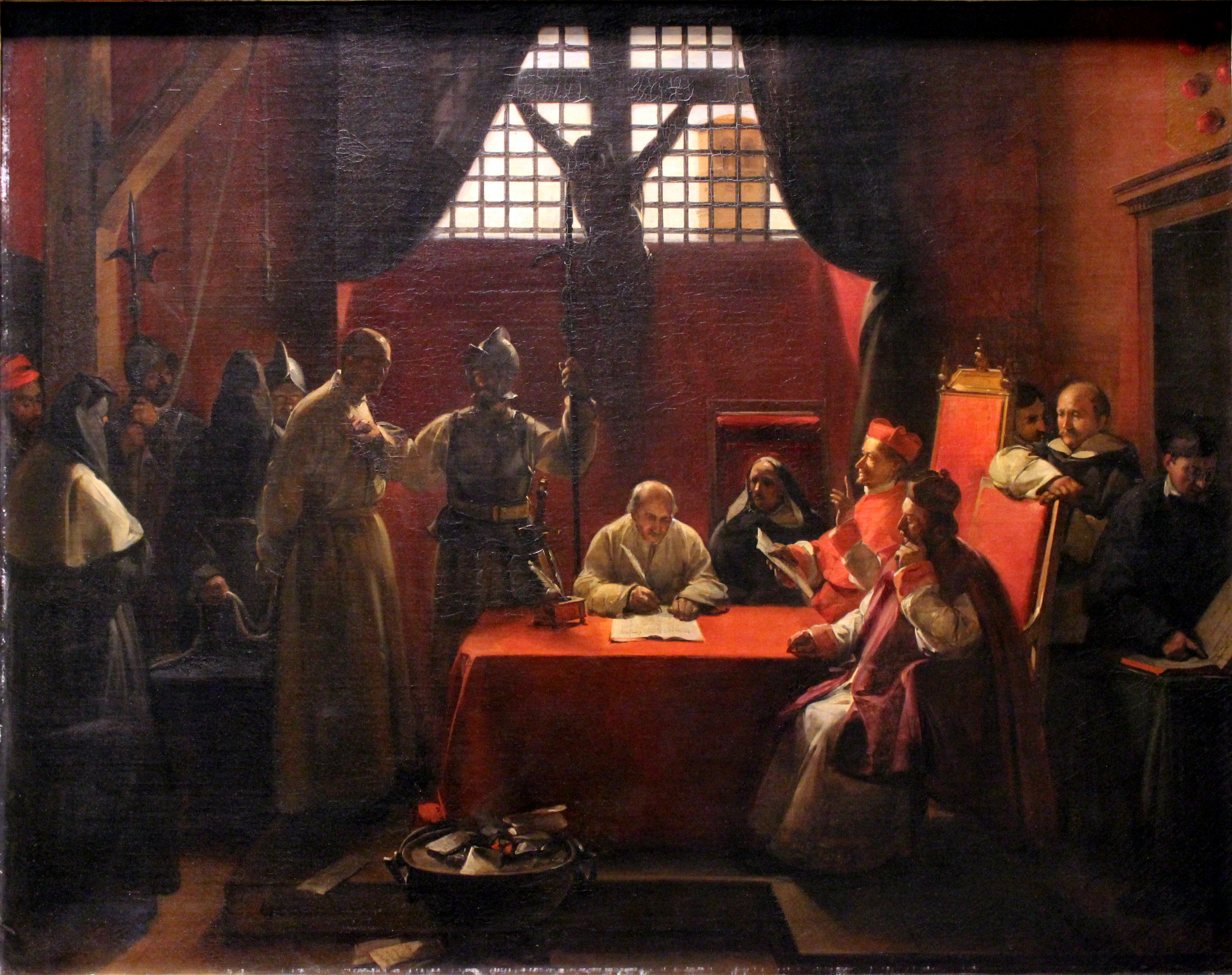
The Examination of Savonarola (1846)
(Musée des Beaux-Arts de Lyon, Lyon)

== Memorial ==
A museum in the centre of Aix-en-Provence is named after him, the Musée Granet. It was built in 1838, and holds eight paintings by Paul Cézanne.
