= Émile Loubon =

French painter (1809–1863)

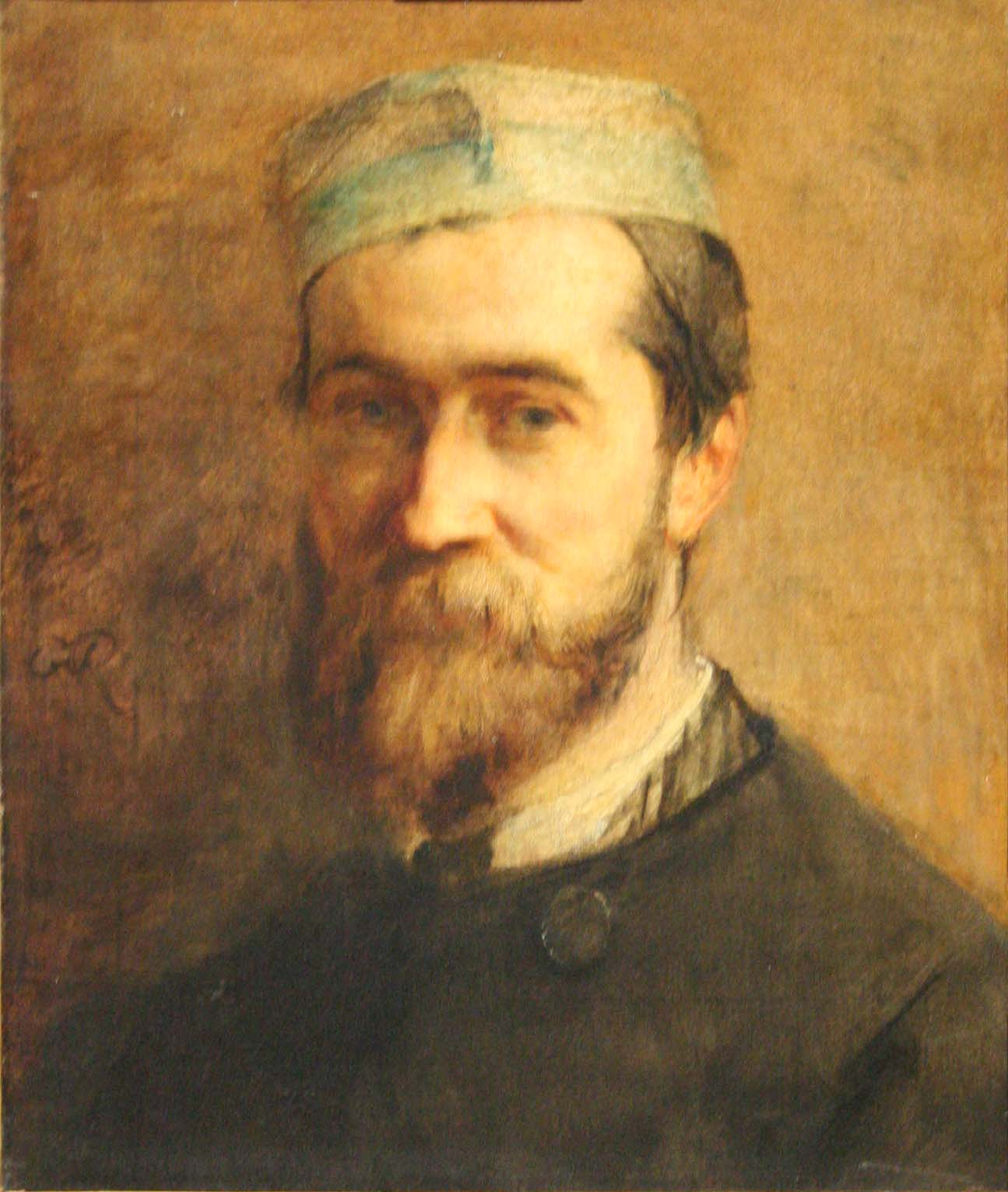
Émile Loubon; portrait by Louis Gustave Ricard

Émile Charles Joseph Loubon (12 January 1809, Aix-en-Provence - 3 May 1863, Marseille) was a French painter, known for his panoramic landscapes of Provence, featuring figures and animals.

== Biography ==
He was the son of Noël Augustin François Loubon (1777-?) a wealthy merchant. He originally studied drawing with Jean-Antoine Constantin, François Marius Granet and Louis Mathurin Clérian (1768-1851). The latter, who also served as Director of the École de dessin d'Aix-en-Provence, appears to have had the most influence on his style.

In 1829, Granet invited him to come along on a study trip to Rome, where he became acquainted with architecture in addition to painting. It was there he began doing landscapes and remained for two years. He returned to France in 1831 and went to Paris, where he associated with other young artists; notably Thomas Couture, with whom he collaborated on a work that he was preparing for the Église Saint-Jean-de-Malte. In 1833, he was awarded a medal at the Salon.

The sudden financial ruin of his father forced a quick return to Aix in 1845. His uncle, who was an assistant at the École des beaux-arts de Marseille, managed to get him a position in the drawing school. He soon attracted attention for his efforts to find new, more realistic ways to teach drawing. During that time, he also created the first salon for "friends of the arts" in Marseille. It drew such participants as Eugène Delacroix, Camille Corot and Prosper Marilhat. After 1848, it was suspended due to unfavorable political events. The following year, he spent some time in the Near East and produced some Orientalist paintings.

In 1853, he held his second exhibition at the Salon, which was favorably reviewed. It was at this time that he began to express his dislike for the color blue. In his later years, blue became gray or brown in most of his works.

It is generally believed that he suffered from serious marital problems. His wife had been a model and was apparently very spoiled and petulant. He also expressed some bitterness for the art world in general, saying that he had been exploited and his works misused.

He was in poor health for many years and succumbed to intestinal cancer in 1863. Among his notable students may be mentioned Joseph-Marius Cabasson, Édouard-Auguste Imer and Alphonse Moutte.

== Selected paintings ==
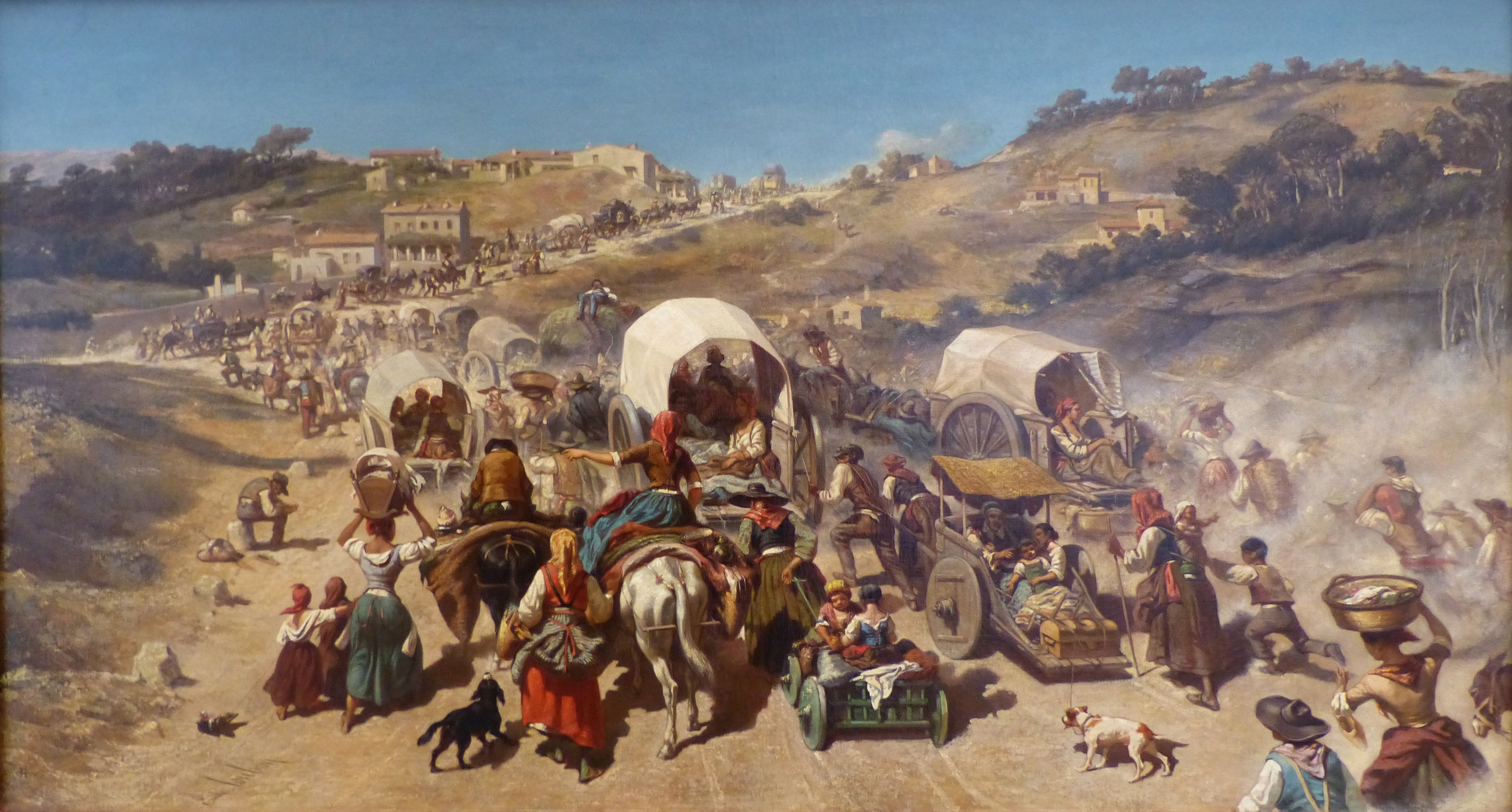
Fleeing from a Cholera Epidemic

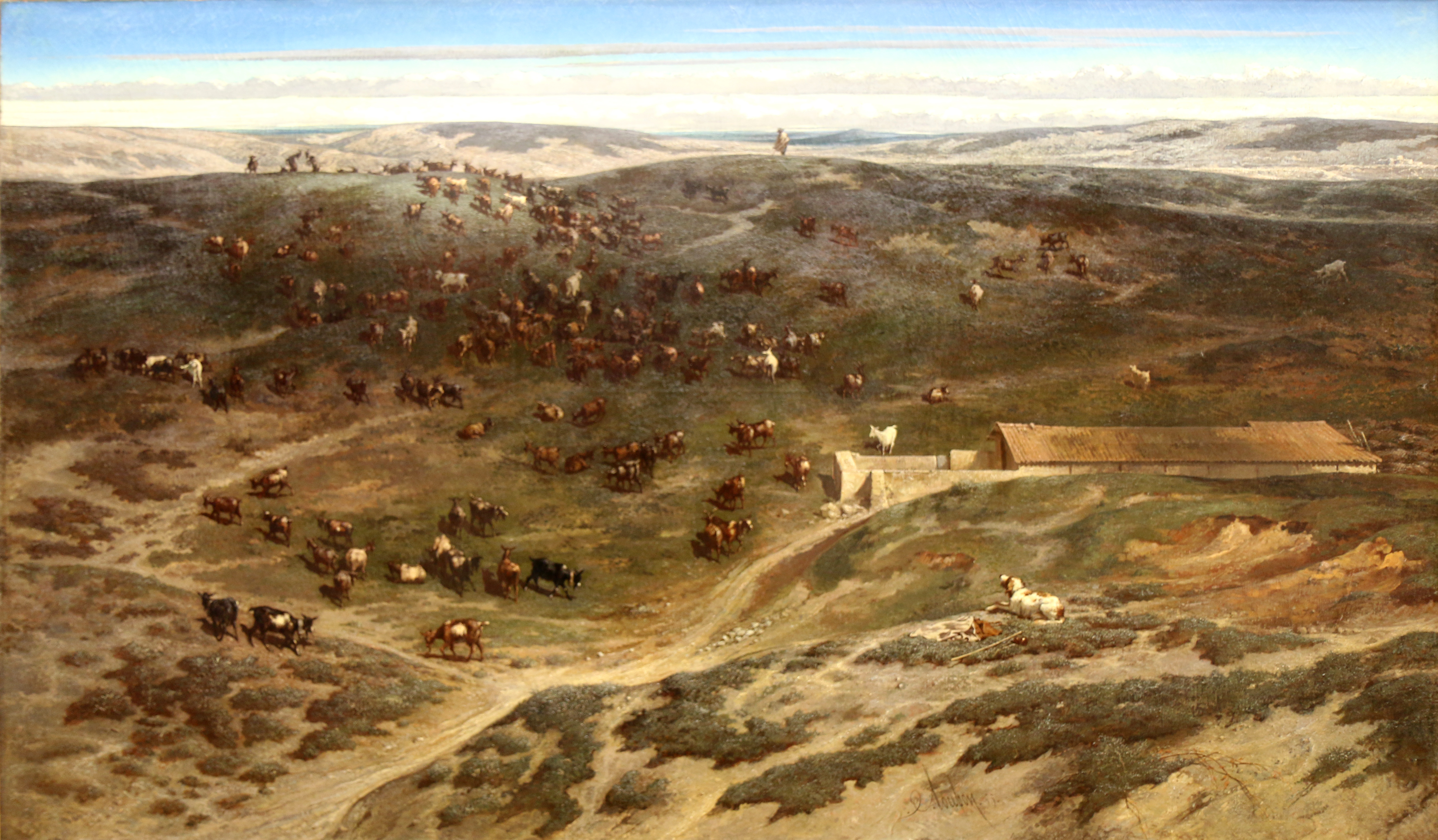
The Col de la Gineste

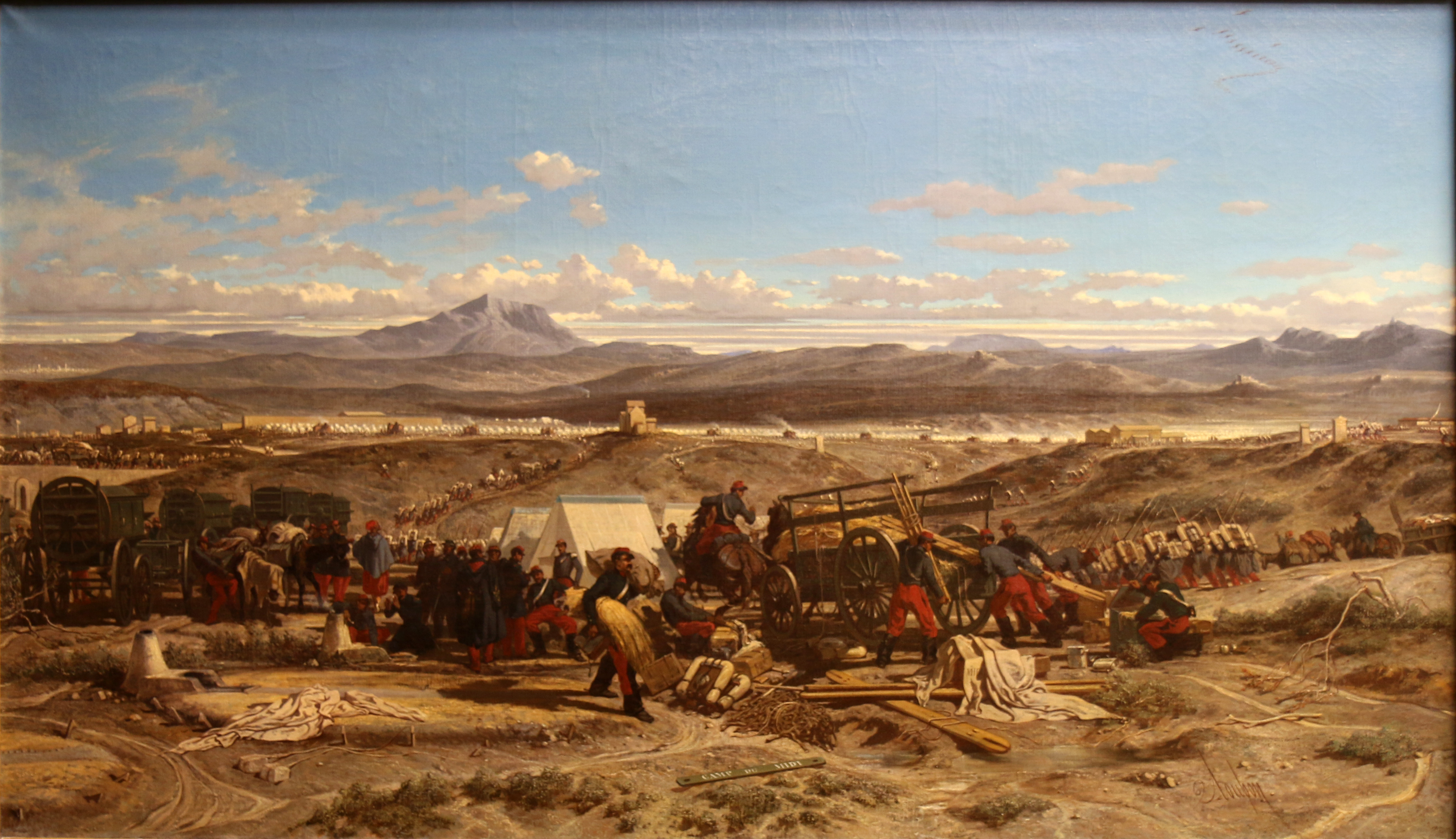
Breaking Camp at Mid-day

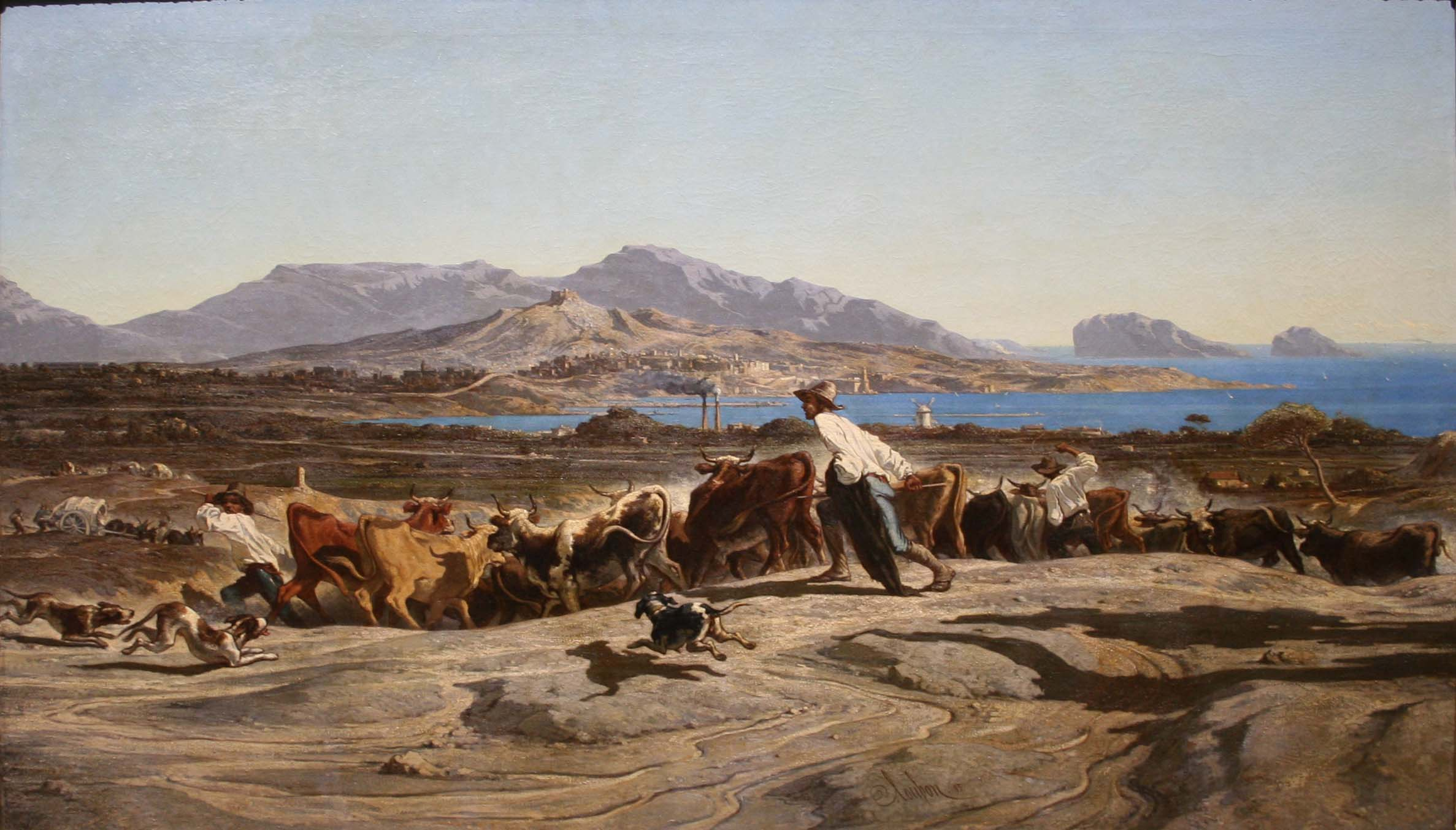
View of Marseille
