= Montaigne Visiting Torquato Tasso in Prison (Granet) =

1820 painting by François Marius Granet

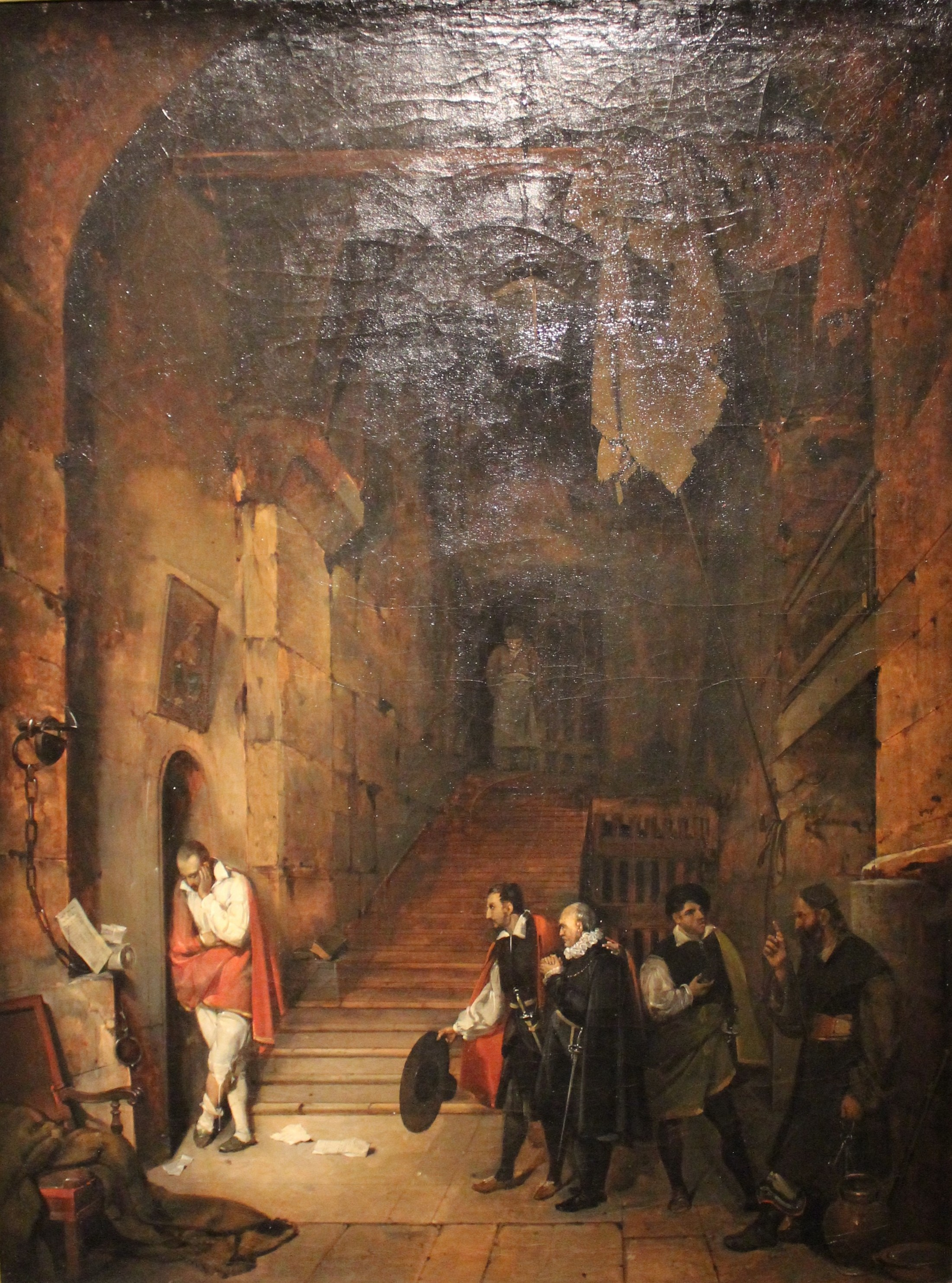
- Artist: François Marius Granet
- Year: 1820
- Medium: oil on canvas
- Dimensions: 98,5 × 74,5 cm
- Location: Musée Fabre, Montpellier

Montaigne Visiting Torquato Tasso in Prison is an 1820 painting by François Marius Granet, now in the Musée Fabre in Montpellier. It shows Montaigne visiting Torquato Tasso.

It was displayed at the Musée des beaux-arts de Lyon in its 2014 exhibition L'invention du Passé. Histoires de cœur et d'épée 1802-1850.
