= Jacques de Cambrai =

Jacques de Cambrai (fl. c. 1260–80), sometimes Jaque or Jaikes, was a trouvère from Cambrai. He composed four chansons courtoises, one pastourelle, six devotional chansons, and one Marian rotrouenge. The Berne manuscript preserves all his works, nine of them uniquely. In addition, a chanson and the pastourelle are preserved in the manuscript Oxford Douce 308 and one of the devotional songs is also copied in two other sources. The Berne manuscript notes that his Haute dame, com rose et lis was modelled on (i.e. a contrafactum of) Ausi com l'unicorne sui by Theobald I of Navarre and Mere, douce creature on Quant voi la glaie meure by Raoul de Soissons. Otherwise none of his music survives, though staves for its transcription were prepared. Of all Jacques's works, only his rotrouenge, the Retrowange novelle, has no model mentioned in the manuscripts; its rubric reads only "Jaikes de Cambrai—De Notre Dame" (Jaque of Cambrai—On Our Lady).

Jacques's devotional songs emphasise Jesus' humanity and his Passion. These may be directed at the Cathars, who denied Christ's humanity. Jacques was one of the last medieval French poets to express his devotion to Mary primarily through chansons, that is, modelled on the chansons courtoises or love songs. After him the tendency was to use the serventois and even later the chant royal.

== Works ==
Secular love songs

- RS933 Amours et jolietés (in CH-BEsu 389, f.7v)
- RS1031 Or m'est bel du tens d'avri (in CH-BEsu 389, f.169r)
- RS1631 = RS1617 Force d'Amour me destraint et justise (in CH-BEsu 389, f.77v; also in GB-Ob Douce 308)
- RS2044 N'est pas courtois, ains est fols et estous (in CH-BEsu 389, f.158r)

Pastourelles

- RS1855 Ier matinet delés un vert buisson (in CH-BEsu 389, f.65r; also in GB-Ob Douce 308)

Marian poems and their models

Incipit	Genre	Model (contrafactum of:)	Composer of model
Grant talen ai k'a chanteir me retraie (RS114)	chanson	Loaus amors et desiriés de joie (RS1730)	Colart le Boutellier
Haute dame, com rose et lis (RS1563)	chanson	Ausi conme unicorne sui (RS2075)	Theobald I of Navarre
Kant je plus pens a commencier chanson (RS1856)	chanson	Tuit mi desir et tuit mi grief torment (RS741)	Theobald I of Navarre
Loeir m'estuet la roïne Marie (RS1178)	chanson	De bone amor et de loial amie (me vient) (RS1102)	Gace Brulé
Meire, douce creature (RS2091)	chanson	Quant voi la glaie meüre (RS2107)	Raoul de Soissons
O Dame, ke Deu portais (RS197a=RS380)	chanson	Aïmans fins et verais (RS199)	Gautier d'Espinal
Retrowange novelle (RS602)	rotrouenge	probably none, possibly pastourelle or ballette	

== Discography ==
- Graindelavoix, Confréries: Devotional songs by Jaikes de Cambrai, 2013, Glossa Music GCD P32108.
