= Ernoul le Vielle de Gastinois =

13th-century French composer

Ernoul le Vielle (also corrected as le Viel and le Vieux) de Gastinois was a trouvère of the late thirteenth century. His name may indicate that he was from the Gâtinais, but vielle could mean either "the old" or "the vielle-player".

Two lais have been attributed to Ernoul. Both are found only in the Noailles Chansonnier (BnF fr.12615). The Lai de notre-dame (incipit: En entente curieuse) is ascribed to him in the manuscript, but the Lai de l'ancien et du nouveau testament (incipit: S'onques hom en lui s'asist) is presented anonymously and was only assigned to Ernoul by Alfred Jeanroy. David Fallows describes his two lais as "among the most unusual in the entire monophonic repertory, astonishingly long with complex repetition schemes and elaborate motivic structure."

Five pastourelles have also been attributed to Ernoul, and all are preserved only in the Chansonnier du Roi (BnF fr.844). The attribution of only one, En avril, au tens novel, is highly disputed. Though anonymous in the manuscript, modern scholars have disagreed whether it belongs to Ernoul's corpus, with one assigning it instead to Thibaut de Blaison. It has two lines that are identical to two found in Pensis, chief enclin, which is attributed in the manuscript to Ernoul but is incomplete. Musically it is unusual among Enroul's pieces for its less restricted style. Pensis, chief enclin later formed the basis of a motet with Flos filius eius. The only other pastourelle ascribed to Ernoul in the manuscript, Por conforter mon corage, was also used in a later motet, and its melody was used in another with Crescens incredulitas. Two further pastourelles, both incomplete and anonymous, have been assigned to Ernoul because they appear beside his other works and are similar in language and musical style: Quant voi le tans avrilier and Tres pensant d'une amourete. The language of all these is francien, the dialect of the Île-de-France, with a trace of the Picard dialect.

== Selected recordings ==
- La chanson de Guillaume - including Ernoul le Viel Lai de l'ancien et du nouveau testament and Crescens in Credulitas. Diabolus in Musica 1999
