= Simon d'Authie =

Simon d'Authie or d'Autie (1180/90 – after 1235) was a lawyer, priest and Old French trouvère. He was from Authie, and died at Amiens. Up to eleven songs are attributed to him, but only five are certain. He is also the respondent in three jeux-partis.

From at least 1223 Simon served as a canon, and in 1228 as dean of the chapter, at Amiens Cathedral. He worked as a lawyer for the Abbey of Saint Vaast in a lawsuit against lay assessors (1222–26) and a case involving the chapter of Arras Cathedral (1232).

Simon was respondent in a jeu-parti with Gilles le Vinier ("Maistre Simon, d'un esample nouvel") and in another two with Hue le Maronnier ("Symon, le quel emploie" and "Symon, or me faites"). The latter two were judged by the trouvère Adam de Givenchi. Both Gilles and Adam appear in the same documents relating to Amiens and Saint Vaast.

== Songs ==
=== Chansons ===
Eleven songs are ascribed to Simon in the standard catalogue. They have varying levels of competing attributions in other sources. The assessment of probability of his authorship below takes into account whether the ascription is in witnesses from more than one manuscript family.

==== Almost certainly by Simon ====
Despite a competing attribution to Thibaut de Champagne in TrouvC, where the composer attributions were added slightly later and are notoriously unreliable, the most secure attribution is for RS525 because it is attributed to Simon in witnesses from two different independent manuscript families: TrouvM and TrouvT on the one hand and three members of the KNPX group(all but TrouvX) on the other.

- RS525 Tant ai Amours servie et honoree. Attributed to Simon in TrouvM and TrouvT; and in TrouvK, TrouvN, and TrouvP; also in TrouvC where it is attributed to Thibaut de Champagne, likely incorrectly.

==== Probably by Simon ====
Six songs have a high likelihood of being by Simon but lack corroborating witnesses outside their appearance in the collection of his attributed songs in MSS TrouvM and TrouvT, which are in the same family. For five of these songs, witnesses outside that family are anonymous; for RS487 there is additionally an attribution to a composer local to the Messine manuscript TrouvC, Gautier d'Espinal.

- RS487 Bone amour qui m'agree. In two manuscripts (TrouvM and TrouvT) and attributed to Simon in both.
- RS623 Quant la saison comence. In two manuscripts (TrouvM and TrouvT) and attributed to Simon in both.
- RS665 Fols est qui a ensient. In four manuscripts: attributed to Simon in TrouvM and TrouvT, anonymous in TrouvI and TrouvC. The pedes melody is used to set the first four lines of Vhe proclamet clericorum, a conductus in the Florence motet manuscript.
- RS1381=1385 Quant li dous estes define. In three manuscripts: attributed to Simon in TrouvM and TrouvT and anonymous in TrouvU, with a slightly different opening.
- RS1415 Quant je voi le gaut foillir. In two manuscripts (TrouvM and TrouvT) and attributed to Simon in both.
- RS1802 Li noviaus tans qui fait paroir. In two manuscripts (TrouvM and TrouvT) and attributed to Simon in both.

==== Possibly by Simon ====
For RS1460 the two different manuscript families are internally consistent but split in their attribution, with the KNPX group attributing it consistently to Raoul de Ferrières. While RS183 is only in the two main sources for Simon's work, TrouvT and TrouvM, the former includes it among the run of his songs, whereas the latter attributes it to Gace Brulé and copies it with his songs. In both cases, the likelihood of ascription must rest on factors that make the competing attribution more or less likely.

- RS183 Li biaus estes se resclaire. In two manuscripts (TrouvM and TrouvT): TrouvT attributes it to Simon but TrouvM copies it among the works of Gace Brulé, although TrouvM's table of content lists it among the songs of Simon.
- RS1460 On ne peut pas a deus seigneurs servir. In seven manuscripts: TrouvM, TrouvT, and Trouva attribute it to Simon, but TrouvK, TrouvN, TrouvP, and TrouvX attribute it to Raoul de Ferrières.

==== Unlikely to be by Simon ====
Two songs appear to be by someone else. RS327 is attributed not to Simon but to Sauval Cosset in the two central sources for Simon's work, TrouvT and TrouvM. It also appears in three members of the KNPX group (not in TrouvX) but its attribution there varies: TrouvK and TrouvP ascribe it to Simon, but TrouvN names Jehan l'Orgueneur; TrouvC transmits it anonymously. The very widely copied song, RS882, is absent from TrouvM, anonymous in three other sources, and ascribed to the Chastelain de Couci in the three members of the KNPX group that carry it (all but TrouvN). While these two songs are similar in strength of attribution to those in the category above, the presence of more than one competing name for the former and the reduction of the later's attribution to a single witness in a large group of copies make them perhaps slightly weaker.

- RS327 Amours qui fait de moi tout son comant. In six manuscripts: attributed to Sauvale Cosset in TrouvM and TrouvT; to Simon in TrouvK and TrouvP; to Jehan l'Orgeuneur in TrouvN, and anonymous in TrouvC.
- RS882 Nouvele Amours ou j'ai mis mon penser. In seven manuscripts: attributed to Simon in TrouvT and placed by his works in an author cluster in Trouva; the Chastelain de Couci in TrouvK, TrouvP, and TrouvX; anonyous in TrouvC, TrouvL, and TrouvV.

=== Jeux partis (debate songs) ===
Simon is the respondent in three jeux-partis. Two, RS289 and RS1818, are unica and are with Hue le Maronnier, about whom nothing more is known. The third, RS572, is in two manuscripts where it is ascribed to in one of which it is clearly ascribed to Gilles le Vinier. Little is known about how the composition of jeux-partis' stanzas and melody was divided up between the two named participants; it may be that Simon is only the author of the even-numbered stanzas in which he is the 'je'.

- RS289 Simon, lequel emploie mieus son temps. Unicum in Trouvb, with Hue le Maronnier.
- RS572 Maistre Simon, d'un essample nouvel. In three manuscripts (TrouvA, Trouva, and Trouvb), with Gilles le Vinier.
- RS1818 Simon, or me faites savoir. Unicum in Trouvb with Hue le Maronnier.

== Sources ==
- Theodore Karp. "Simon d'Authie" Grove Music Online. Oxford Music Online. Oxford University Press, accessed 5 April 2013 (paywalled).
- Friedrich Gennrich, 'Simon d’Authie: Ein pikardischer Sänger', Zeitschrift für romanische Philologie 67 (1951): 49–104 (paywalled).
