= Gilles de Vieux-Maisons =

Gilles depicted in the Chansonnier du Roi at the start of his songs

Gilles de Vieux-Maisons (Latin: Gilo de Veteribus Domibus) was a French nobleman and trouvère.

Gilles belonged to a noble family that held the fief of Vieux-Maisons in the county of Brie. In a charter of August 1211, the countess–regent Blanche of Champagne confirmed an agreement by which Gilles had rented a house to the Jews of Provins for 100 sous per annum. The house owed an annual render to the Abbey of the Paraclete. Another charter of 1211 confirms that Gilles lived in Provins.

Gilles had an amicable literary relationship with Gace Brulé, Conon de Béthune and Pierre de Molins. Gace addressed three songs to him as Gillet/Gillés/Gilet; Conon addressed him in one song as Gilon; and Pierre addressed him once as Gilet. Prior to 1201, they engaged in a literary debate about love and whether it was possible to sing without it. In his piece Chanter m'estuet, car pris m'en est corage (I Must Sing for I Desire to Do So), Gilles answers in the affirmative, as against his friends, saying "I will sing without love, out of habit" (si chanterai sanz amors, par usage). Gilles thus became famous for his opposition to the ideal of courtly love. The debate came to include Gautier de Coinci, Blondel de Nesle and the Chastelain de Couci. All took a stand against Gilles's "notorious anticourtliness".

Gilles is the composer of six surviving songs:

- Pluie ne vens gelee ne froidure
- Chanter m'estuet car pris m'en est corage
- Se per mon chant me deiisse aligier
- J'oi tout avant blasmé puis voil blasmer
- ]e chans mais c'est mavais signes
- Gai cuer et gent doit avoir sanz muer

In the last, his authorship is hidden in an acrostic. His name, Gilet, is spelled out by the first letter of each stanza.
