= Corbie (disambiguation) =

Corbie is a commune of the Somme département in northern France.

Corbie may also refer to:

== Animals ==
- Corbie (bird) or Common raven
- Corbie (moth) (Oncopera intricata), a moth of Australia

== Places ==
- Canton of Corbie, Somme, Hauts-de-France, France
- Corbie Abbey, a former Benedictine monastery in Corbie, Picardy, France
- Corbie Hill, New South Wales

== People ==
- Saint Adalard of Corbie (751–827), adviser to Charlemagne and co-founder of Corvey Abbey
- Colette of Corbie (1381–1447), French abbess and foundress of the Colettine Poor Clares
- Pierre de Corbie (died after 1195), French troubadour
- Saint Radbert of Corbie (785–865), Carolingian theologian and abbot of Corbie Abbey
- Ratramnus of Corbie (died c. 868), Frankish monk
- Vielart de Corbie (13th century), French troubadour
- Wala of Corbie (c. 755–836), adviser to Charlemagne and co-founder of Corvey Abbey

== See also ==
- Corby (disambiguation)
