= Bestournés =

Bestournés (also Bestornez, Bestorneis, le Bastorneis, Baistornez) is a name given to the thirteenth-century trouvère credited with writing five pieces (three love songs, one jeu-parti, and one pastourelle) preserved in later thirteenth and early fourteenth century song books. The name is mostly likely a sobriquet meaning 'altered', 'changed', 'reversed', or 'metamorphosed', often 'applied to someone who, by a quirk of fate, underwent a complete reversal of fortune, either favorable or unfavorable'. As all six of these songs are preserved in the Berne Chansonnier (Bern, Burgerbibliothek, MS 389), which was copied in Metz, and all but one of the songs are only copied there and in other Metz-copied sources, the poet-composer can probably be associated with the musical life of medieval Metz. As the name is likely a nickname or sobriquet (meaning ‘turned backward’ or ‘turned the wrong way’) the individual cannot be traced. Only one song, the more widely copied Or seroit mercis de saison (RS 1894) survives with a melody in the Chansonnier du Roi and the Chansonnier de Noailles, which transmit slightly different versions of the melody.

== Works ==
The surviving songs include one jeu-parti and one pastourelle. As the Berne songbook was designed for melodies that were never entered, the Oxford chansonnier TrouvI was not designed for musical notation at all, and no melodies were enter for either of the songs in the Saint-Germain-des-Prés chansonnier, TrouvU, the only song for which a melody can be recovered Or seroit mercis de saison (RS 1894) which has been edited by Tischler.

The jeu-parti is with one ‘Gautier’ for whom several identifications have been proposed including Gautier de Dargies, Gautier de Formeseles, Gautier de Pontis, and Gautier de Bregi. It appears to be copied incompletely (three stanzas only) between stanzas 3 and 4 of another song (see below). The dilemma posed is whether Gautier would be less pained by catching his beloved lady in a compromising situation with another knight or by seeing his wife give a single kiss to someone that she shouldn’t.

Among the songs is the Abecedarium RS 279, which tends to confirm the Lotharingian provenance of the author since the opening word ‘An’ is the dialect spelling of ‘En’ but is needed to start with ‘A’ to make the ABC sequence work (that said, the final stanza spells ‘E!’ as ‘He!’).

=== Songs ===
- RS 279: En [recte: An] mon chant di que je sui tous semblans. TrouvC f.12r-v (empty staves; marginal author attribution); Abecedary song (letters A-E only) with 10 decasyllabic line strophes with rhyme scheme ABAB CCDDED.
- RS 1894: Or seroit mercis de saison. TrouvC f.168v (with empty staves; marginal author attribution); TrouvM f.9r (with melody; first two lines torn away; rubric gives author name); TrouvT 48r-v (with melody; rubric gives author name); TrouvO f.92r-v (marginal author ascription added later; with a different continuation after the first stanza). Bestournés names himself in the envoy. Musical edition in Tischler 1997.
- RS 1245: Novels voloir me revient. TrouvC f.160v-161r (empty staves; marginal author attribution); TrouvU f.27v-28r (empty staves; marginal author ascription added later).

=== Jeu-parti ===
- RS1442a: Gautier, un jeu vous vueil partir. In both copies three stanzas only of this song are copied in the text residuum between stanzas 3 and 4 of the anonymous song Quant je voi mon cuer revenir (RS1448), which has a similar versification and would likely have provided the melodic model for this jeu-parti contrafact if notation were available. TrouvC f. 201v (empty staves; marginal author attribution); TrouvU f.26v-27r (empty staves; marginal author ascription added later).

=== Pastourelle ===
- RS 576: En [recte: An] mai au dous tens novel (Que florissent). TrouvC f.11v (empty staves; marginal author attribution); TrouvI f.200r (P18) (accessible at https://digital.bodleian.ox.ac.uk/inquire/p/1bf6d14f-e7de-403a-94f9-d8ba1aabd994).
