= Thibaut de Blaison =

The music of Bien voi que ne puis morir

Thibaut de Blaison, Blason, or Blazon (died after March 1229) was a Poitevin nobleman, Crusader, and trouvère from a noble family with lands in Blason and Mirabeau. Eleven poems—one contested and one definitely spurious—have been ascribed to Thibaut in the chansonniers. Three further anonymous songs have also been attributed to him by Terence H. Newcombe, his modern editor.

Thibaut was the seneschal of Poitou and his uncle was Maurice, Bishop of Poitiers. In 1214 Thibaut helped negotiate a truce between Philip II of France and John of England. In 1212 he was taking part in the Reconquista in Spain and he was among the Albigensian Crusaders besieging Toulouse in 1218. He appears alongside the trouvère Amauri de Craon in a document of 1219. He attended the coronation of Louis IX in 1226, along with the trouvère Hue de la Ferté.

Theobald I of Navarre, also a trouvère, dedicated the song De ma dame souvenir to Thibaut and also used Thibaut's Amours, que porra devenir as a model for a religious poem of his own. Gautier d'Espinal also borrowed the melody of Amours for one piece.

Thibaut himself borrowed from rhythms from the polyphonic repertoire of the day. He may have based his Bien font Amours lor talent on the conductus Quid frustra consumeris and Chanter et renvoisier seuil on Sol sub nube latuit. With the exception of three chansons that are restricted to a sixth—Amours, que porra devenir, Chanter et renvoisier seuil, and Huimain par un ajourant—and one, Li miens chanters ne puet mais remanoir, which is severely restricted in movement, most of Thibaut's melodies move freely. They are all basically syllabic, with only Li miens chanters exhibiting more complex melisma. Compared to his melodies (all recorded in bar form), his prosody is usually simple, though three songs—Bien font Amours lor talent, Bon jour ait hui cele a cui sui amis, and Quant je voi esté venir—exhibit some variety. The simplicity of Bien font Amours is more in keeping with Thibaut's style and not the more "flamboyant" style of Gautier de Dargies, to whom it is also attributed.

== List of songs ==
- Amours, que porra devenir
  - Model for De chanter ne me puis tenir (Theobald I of Navarre) and Se par force de merci (Gautier d'Espinal, only music)
- Bien voi que ne puis morir
- Bon jour ait hui cele a cui sui amis (no music)
- Chanter et renvoisier seuil
  - Contrafactum is Pour mon chief reconforter (Gautier de Coincy)
- Chanter m'estuet, si crien morir
- Huimain par un ajourant
- Li miens chanters ne puet mais remanoir
- Quant je voi esté venir
- Quant se resjouissent oisel (no music)

Disputed

- Bien font Amours lor talent
  - Contrafactum is C'est en mai, au mois d'esté (anonymous)

Attributed (anonymous in MSS)

- Avant ier me chevauchoi (motet no.402)
- Avant ier me chevauchoie (no music)
- En avril au tens nouvel
