= Quens de Bretaigne =

Start of Bernart a vous vueil demander in chansonnier P. The red rubric above the initial B reads Li q̃us de bretaigne

Li quens de Bretaigne, 'the count of Brittany', is the attributed author of a series of five Old French trouvère songs and implicitly of a sixth found in a section of trouvère chansonnier P. The identity of the unnamed count and the authenticity of the attribution are matters of debate.

== The songs ==
The six songs are:

- Bernart a vous vueil demander, a jeu-parti with Bernart de la Ferté, in which the count argues that prowess (proece) is superior to largesse (largece) and Bernart argues the opposite
- Chanter me fet ma dame
- Nouviaument m'est pris envie
- Longuement ai esté pensis, a contrafactum of Bernart a vous vueil demander
- Haute chancon de haute estoire di, a contrafactum of Pres sui d'amours, mais loins sui de celi by Chardon de Croisilles
- Je ferai chancon novelle, unattributed and added by a different scribe

Bernart a vous vueil demander is the only one of the songs found in any other chansonnier, namely in K, N, O and X.

At least two other Old French lyric poems are attributed to a count of Brittany, both jeux-partis: Jauseme, quel vos est semblant with Gaucelm Faidit and Gasse, par droit me respondez with Gace Brulé. In the 19th century, Hermann Suchier first proposed that these were composed by the same composer of the six songs in chansonnier P. This is an improbable hypothesis, since the identity of the other named persons in the songs tends to separate them by several decades. The poet of Jauseme and Gasse is usually identified with Geoffrey II of Brittany (died 1186).

== Identity of the count ==
There are two main candidates for the identity of the count of Brittany, more usually called duke of Brittany. These are Peter I, called Mauclerc, who was acting duke from 1213 to 1237, and his son, John I le Roux, born in 1217, who assumed control of the duchy in 1237 and reigned until 1286. While older scholarship favoured Peter, scholars today generally favour John.

The identity of the other persons mentioned in the songs is consistent with John I as the poet. At the end of the song Bernart a vous vueil demander, the poets submit their dispute to the ajudication of two judges, the comte d'Aniou and the cuens de Guelle. The former is the count of Anjou, identified with Charles I, count from 1246. Bernart de la Ferté was his vassal. Bernart himself did not become lord of Ferté until between 1237 and 1250. The identification of the county of Guelle is uncertain. It may refer to the County of Guelders, but Joseph Mason argues that it is more likely to be the County of Goëlo in Brittany. The count of Goëlo at the time was Henri II d'Avaugour.

== Authenticity ==
Joseph W. Mason argues that the collection of songs attributed to the quens de Bretaigne in chansonnier P constitute a libellus (short book) crafted for the purpose of rehabilitating Brittany's reputation after the disastrous reign of Peter I. They are not genuine songs composed by John I, rather John is a "lyric personae", a "ventriloquize[d] historical figure", created by a scribe. The libellus is seamlessly integrated into chansonnier, although it was the work of a group of at least four text scribes and at least two music scribes, none of whom copied anything else in the chansonnier.

== Bibliography ==
- Harvey, Ruth; Paterson, Linda M. (2010). The Troubadour Tensos and Partimens: A Critical Edition. Boydell & Brewer.
- Linker, Robert White (1979). A Bibliography of Old French Lyrics. Romance Monographs.
- Maréchal, Chantal A. (2019). "Pierre de Dreux, dit Mauclerc, serait-il l'auteur de Tydorel?". Cahiers de civilisation médiévale. 62 (248): 331–352.
- Mason, Joseph W. (2018). "Debatable Chivalry". Medium Ævum. 87 (2): 255–276. doi:10.2307/26889818.
- Raulin, Yves de (1942). Le Jeu-Parti Dialogué entre Pierre de Dreux, dit Mauclerc, et Bernard V de la Ferté-Bernard. Imprimerie-Librairie Goupil.
