= Pierre de Molins =

Pierre de Molins or Molaines (fl. 1190–1220) was an early trouvère. He knew either Gace Brulé or the Chastelain de Couci, two of the first-generation trouvères. He was probably a member of a landed family of Épernay, or possibly of a family resident in and around Noyon. He is probably the local "Pierre II" referred to in documents from between 1210 and 1224.

Four songs are attributed to Pierre in the Chansonnier du Roi and the Noailles Chansonnier, and all appear in other chansonniers with different attributions. All the melodies are in bar form. Most unusual are the presence of a melodic tritone in two sources for Fine amours et bone esperance and of a sharpened subdominant in Chanter me fet ce don't je crien morir, both created by the use of accidentals. Fine amours served as the model for an anonymous composition of the same name (the second line beginning Me fait), an anonymous piece beginning L'autrier par une matinee, and an anonymous song to the Virgin Mary, Douce dame, vierge Marie. The music of Chanter me fet was used in two different readings of Pour la pucele en chantant me deport by Gautier de Coincy and the lyrics were a model for the anonymous Destroiz d'amours et pensis sans deport. The other pieces attributed to Pierre are Quant foillissent li boscage and Tant sai d'amours con cil qui plus l'emprent.
