= Richart de Semilli =

French trouvère (12th–13th century)

- Born: Paris, France
- Occupation: Trouvère (poet-composer)
- Years active: fl. late 12th or early 13th century
- Era: Medieval
- Style: Classical

Richart de Semilli (fl. late 12th or early 13th century) was a trouvère, probably from Paris, which he mentions three times in his extant works. These works include ten in a chansonnier (with a few also copied into related manuscripts) and one anonymous song, "L'une est la chastelaine, devers Mont le Heri", which has sometimes been attributed to him by modern scholars, but of which most of the first strophe and music are missing.

Unusually for a trouvère, de Semilli used the same poetic structure and melody for his "Chancon ferai plein d'ire et de pensee" and "Je chevauchai l'autrier la matinee", and also for "De chanter m'est pris courage" and "Quant la sesons renouvele". Even within his pieces, his melodies make heavy use of repetition, another departure from what was typical of the trouvères. "J'ain la plus sade riens qui soit de mere nee" uses one phrase and a variant, while "L'autrier chevauchoie delés Paris" uses three phrases and their variants for eleven lines. This last piece, along with "Molt ai chanté, riens ne m'i puet valoir" and "Nous venions l'autrier de joer", each use variations of the last melodic lines three times. All his melodies are simple, with "Molt ai chanté" being the most ornate. None survive in mensural notation, but this has not prevented the suggestion that "De chanter" is in the second mode. For his other pieces, de Semilli preferred the authentic D mode and plagal F mode. "Chancon ferai" and "L'autrier tous seus chevauchoie mon chemin" are rotrouenges.

Several of de Semilli's pieces were used as models by other trouvères. "Chancon ferai" and "Je chevauchai" served as models for an anonymous song about the Virgin Mary, "Chanter vous vueil de la vierge Marie". "L'autrier chevauchoie" was a model for the anonymous "L'autrier m'en aloie"; "L'autrier tout seus" for the anonymous "De la tres douce Marie vueil chanter", another song about Mary; and "Nous venions" for yet another Marian praise, "On doit la mere Dieu honorer". de Semilli's song "Par amors ferai chanson" is similar to two other songs, but whether it was the model (earlier piece) or the contrafactum (later) is not clear. The two other songs are "Qui veut amours maintenir" by Moniot de Paris, a fellow Parisian, and "D'Amour me doit souvenir" by the Moine de Saint Denis, also a local.
