= Veau =

Veau is a surname. Notable people with the surname include:

- Francesco Veau (1727–1768), Italian Baroque painter
- Guillaume Veau, 13th-century French trouvère
