= Baudouin des Auteus =

Baudouin des Auteus (Latin: Balduinus de Altaribus) was a Picard trouvère of the early thirteenth century, probably from Autheux near Doullens. According to Theodore Karp, "the two works attributed to him are both of disputed authorship."

The song M'ame et mon cors doing a celi is recorded with two different melodies, one in the manuscript tradition of BnF F-Pa 5198 and another in the Chansonnier du Roi and Noailles Chansonnier. The latter melody is non-repetitive, while the poem is isometric. The other song ascribed by some manuscripts to Baudouin is Avril ne mai, froidure ne let tans. It too is isometric, decasyllabic, and has nine-line stanzas. Though it is also attributed to Gace Brulé, the attribution to Baudouin is more likely.

It was once suggested that Baudouin des Auteus was the same Baudouin that participated in some jeux partis with Theobald I of Navarre, but this is dubious.
