= John of Braine =

French crusader

John of Braine (Old French: Jehan; c. 1200 – 1240) was, jure uxoris, the count of Mâcon and Vienne from 1224 until his death. He was a younger son of Robert II of Dreux and his second wife, Yolande de Coucy. His wife was Alice, granddaughter of William V of Mâcon. John was also a trouvère and a crusader. He followed King Theobald I of Navarre to the Holy Land in the Barons' Crusade of 1239 and there died a year later. His widow, Alice, sold her counties to Louis IX of France.

Of John's poetry survive one pastourelle, "Par desous l'ombre d'un bois", and two chansons d'amour, "Pensis d'amours, joians et corociés" and "Je n'os chanter trop tart ne trop souvent". Of these "Pensis d'amours" alone is preserved in mensural notation, in the Chansonnier Cangé. In the Manuscrit du Roi and the Chansonnier de Noailles the melody ends on different notes. There exist three French poems attributed to John of Brienne that are in fact the work of John of Braine.

Moniot d'Arras addressed one of his chansons to John, and refers to John's nephew, John the Red, as comte de Bretagne.

== Sources ==
- Berman, Constance Hoffman (2018). The White Nuns: Cistercian Abbeys for Women in Medieval France. University of Pennsylvania Press.
- Painter, Sidney (1969). "The Crusade of Theobald of Champagne and Richard of Cornwall, 1239–1241". In Wolff, Robert Lee; Hazard, Harry W. (eds.). A History of the Crusades, Volume II: The Later Crusades, 1189–1311. University of Wisconsin Press.
- Pippenger, Randall Todd; Jordan, William Chester, eds. (2022). Tales of a Minstrel of Reims in the Thirteenth Century. Translated by Rosenberg, Samuel N. Catholic University of America Press.
