= Kevin Corby =

Kevin Corby may refer to:

- Kevin Corby (cricketer) (born 1959), English cricketer
- Kevin Corby (soccer) (born 1988), American soccer player
- Kevin Corby (politician) (1928–2006), Australian politician
