= Gilles le Vinier =

Medieval French trouvère (d. 1252)

- Born: Arras, Hauts-de-France, France
- Died: 1252
- Occupation: Trouvère (poet-composer)
- Years active: 1220s–1252
- Era: Middle Ages
- Family: Guillaume le Vinier (brother)

Gilles le Vinier (died 1252) was a trouvère from a middle-class family of Arras. He was the younger brother of fellow trouvère Guillaume le Vinier. He entered the church and served as a canon at Arras, where he was the church's legal representative between 1225 and 1234, and at Lille. At Arras, he created several benefices between 1236 and 1246. His last one was founded on the death of his brother. In his song Aler m'estuet la ou je trerai paine he mentions making a pilgrimage to the Holy Land. The records of Arras Cathedral note that a requiem was held for Gilles, called Dominus Aegidius (Lord Gilles), on 13 November 1252.

Gilles composed at least seven songs that have survived. Both Amors ki me le comande and Au partir de la froidure possess "echo rhymes", which is to say that the final syllables of a verse are repeated, with a change in meaning, at the start of the next. His melodies are standard. He composed a lai–descort of ten stanzas.

== List of songs ==
Chansons courtoises

- Aler m'estuet la ou je trerai paine
- Amors ki le me comande
- Au partir de la froidure
- Beaus m'est prins tans au partir de fevrier

Lai–descort

- A ce m'acort

Jeux-partis

- Frere, ki fait mieus a prisier
- Maistre Simon, d'un essample nuvel
