= Vielart de Corbie =

Vielart, Vielars, Wilars or Wilart de Corbie was one of the earliest trouvères from northern France. In one instance a chansonnier names him Willame (Guillaume de Corbie, William from Corbie) and some scholars have followed this, concluding that "Vielart" and its variations form a sobriquet meaning "violist" (player of a vielle) or perhaps "old man" (from French vieillard). He was active in the Île-de-France in the first decades of the thirteenth century at the latest, since his song De chanter me semont Amours was used as the basis for a contrafactum, Quant ces floretes florir voi, by Gautier de Coincy (died 1236). Only two songs can be firmly ascribed to him, and both survive with musical notation: De chanter and Cil qui me prient de chanter, which served as the basis for a Latin contrafactum, Dic, homo, cur abuteris. The music of the Latin song has not survived. Two other songs are ascribed to Vielart in some sources, but they are more probably the work of Gace Brulé: Desconfortés, plain d’ire et de pesance and Moins ai joie que je ne seuil.
