= Oede de la Couroierie =

French trouvère

Oede de la Couroierie (died 1294), also known as Eude de Carigas and Odo de Corigiaria, was a trouvère of Artois.

== Life ==
Oede is documented beginning in 1270 as a clerk in the house of Count Robert II, who often sent him on diplomatic missions. He served Robert until his death. His will, made in June 1294, provides for both his widow with her three children and a mistress with her two. His will calls him both Odon de Paris and Odon de Saint-Germain. He was probably born in the Île-de-France, near Paris.

== Songs and their models ==
All five of Oede's known songs are part of contrafact networks. In most cases, the act of contrafaction is clearly Oede's because the author of the song with which his song shares a melody is a much earlier trouvère. Oede's songs are only preserved in one manuscript family, the so-called KNPX group. All five songs appear in TrouvK (the 'Arsenal chansonnier') and TrouvN (and, presumably in the lost part of TrouvX) in the same order. Only two songs, the pair starting with the letter T, appear in TrouvP. The songs on which Oede's are based are more widely transmitted.

Two of Oede's songs (RS215 and RS1740) use the same melody by Gace Brulé. All three songs are copied in TrouvK and TrouvN (and did appear in TrouvX before folios were lost). But Gace's song also appears copied more widely, featuring in two other chansonnier families. Another of Oede's songs uses the melody of a clearly earlier song by Blondel de Nesle. Of the remaining two songs, one (RS321) shares a melody with a song by Oede's near-contemporary Raoul de Soissons and the other with two other songs, one with disputed attributions and one transmitted anonymously, making relative chronology harder to establish.

=== List of songs ===
Using the melody of Gace Brulé, Desconfortés plain d'ire et de pesance (RS233):

- Tout soit mes cuers en grant desesperance(RS215), copied in TrouvK pp.201-202, TrouvN fol.96v-97r, TrouvP fol.174v-175r, and in a lost part of TrouvX. This song is no.3 in the order of the MSS.
- Desconfortés com cil qui est sans joie (RS1740), copied in TrouvK pp.203-204, TrouvN 98r-v, and in a lost part of TrouvX. This song is no.5 in the order of the MSS.

Using the melody of Blondel de Nesle, A l'entrant d'esté (RS620):

- Trop ai longuement fait grant consirvance (RS210), copied in TrouvK pp.199-200, TrouvN fol.95v-96r, TrouvP 174r-v, and in a lost part of TrouvX. This song is no.1 in the order of the MSS.

Using the melody of Raoul de Soissons, Rois de Navarre et sire de virtu (RS2063):

- Ma derreniere veul fere en chantant (RS321), copied in TrouvK pp.200-201, TrouvN fol.96r-v, and in a lost part of TrouvX. This song is no.2 in the order of the MSS.

Using the same melody as both the anonymous Au repairier que je fis de Provence (RS642) and also Chanter m'estuet, car pris m'en est courage (RS15=1124), which is variously attributed to Gilles de Viés Maisons, Robert de Marberoles, and Conon de Béthune:

- Chançon ferai par grant desesperance (RS216), copied in TrouvK pp.202-203, TrouvN fol.97r-v, and in a lost part of TrouvX. This song is no.4 in the order of the MSS.
