= Robert de Blois =

Robert de Blois (fl. second third of the 13th century) was an Old French poet and trouvère, the author of narrative, lyric, didactic, and religious works. He is known only through his own writings, but one lyric poem ascribed to him, Li departis de douce contree, mentions his involvement in a failed Crusade of 1239. Similarly, his Enseignement has been dated to between 1234 and 1238 from its reference to the political circumstances of the first years of the reign of King Louis IX. He dedicated one of the editions of his works to several lords of Picardy, amongst whom was Geoffrey II of La Chapelle-la-Reine, grand pantler of France, and Hugh Tyrel III, who between them give a date range of ca. 1257 to 1272. It has been pointed out that the compilation of one of the manuscripts that contain his works (MS Arsenal 3516 in the Bibliothèque nationale de France) can be closely dated to 1267 and was written at his direction and so he must still have been alive that year.

== Lyric poems ==
Five lyric poems attributed to Robert survive, two of them with more than one melody. All the melodies are recorded in bar form. His lyric work, however, appears to have found a limited audience. Its manuscript tradition is slight and it had no influence on subsequent poets. Tant com je fusse fors de ma contree is believed to be rather by an earlier poet, Guillaume de Ferrières the Vidame of Chartres, while Li departis de douce contree is also claimed for Chardon de Croisilles.

- Merveil moi que chanter puis
- Par trop celer mon courage
- Puisque me sui de chanter entremis
- Li departis de douce contree (several melodies)
- Tant com je fusse fors de ma contree (several melodies)

== Other works ==
Robert is unusual in the concentration of didactic emphasis on moral conduct in his work, He wrote two manuals of instruction on courtly behaviour: one for noblemen and one for noblewomen. The Enseignement des princes describes how men are to act in public and their moral and religious duties. The Chastoiement des dames (or Enseignements des dames), on the other hand, describes a woman's domestic role, concentrating on etiquette, manners, and modesty. Robert's values have been described as "conservative", but his tone is at times "bantering" and he displays "a measure of flair and wit".

Another feature of Robert's work that has been noted is his interest in theology, of which the best example is his Formemanz du monde et de Adam et d'Eve, a retelling of the first three chapters of Genesis with embellishments from the Latin early medieval Life of Adam and Eve which Robert had consulted.

Floris et Lyriopé (or Liriopé) is a lengthy narrative poem drawn from Ovid. Robert relates the deeds of Narcissus's parents, how they met. His father Floris seduces Lyriopé by dressing in woman's clothes.

In one manuscript both enseignements and the Floris are incorporated into the unfinished Arthurian romance Beaudous. In a scene reminiscent of Chrétien de Troyes's Perceval, Beaudous is instructed by his mother before joining the court of King Arthur.

== Bibliography ==
- "Robert de Blois" Archives de Littérature du moyen âge. Accessed 7 January 2021.
- Falck, Robert. "Robert de Blois." Grove Music Online. Oxford Music Online. Accessed 20 September 2008.
- Krueger, Roberta. 2005. "Robert de Blois." French Literature Companion. The New Oxford Companion to Literature in French. Accessed 21 January 2009.
- Guggenbühl, Claudia (1998). Recherches sur la composition et la structure du ms. Arsenal 3516. Basel: Francke. ISBN 3772020542.
- Mikhaïlova-Makarius, Milena (2010). L'École de roman. Robert de Blois dans le manuscrit BNF fr. 24301. Paris: Honore Champion. ISBN 9782745320452.
