= Gilles de Beaumont =

13th-century French trouvère

Although the painting is damaged, Gilles's coat-of-arms in the Chansonnier du Roi appears to be gironné d'or et de gueules

The coat of the Beaumont-du-Gâtinais, depicted here as gironné d'argent et de gueules

Gilles de Beaumont was a 13th-century trouvère. He is known from a single song in the Chansonnier du Roi. He is depicted as a knight in armour in the illustrated chansonnier.

Gilles's identity is uncertain. The only known Gilles de Beaumont from the period was the eldest son and probably successor of Renier, lord of Beaumont-en-Cambrésis. He was already a knight in 1226, as was his younger brother Renier. He had a younger brother, Gerard, who was still a squire in 1226, and three sisters, Ermengarde, Cecile and Mathilde. Ermengarde married Josse de Liedekerque, while Cecile entered the Augustinian convent of Premy in Cambrai. The youngest, Mathilde, married or remarried in 1268 to Baldwin, lord of Sangatte, a younger son of Baldwin III, Count of Guînes.

The identification of the trouvère with the lord of Beaumont-en-Cambrésis is complicated by the coat-of-arms depicted in the chansonnier, which does not match that of the lords of Beaumont-en-Cambrésis but rather of the lords of Beaumont-du-Gâtinais. The most likely explanation is that the artist of the chansonnier, tasked with depicting Gilles de Beaumont, simply got the coat-of-arms wrong.

Gilles's song, Cil qui d'Amors a droite remembrance, is five stanzas of eight lines each. Its music is preserved.
