= Adam de Givenchi =

Poet-composer and cleric based in Arras

Adam de Givenchi, also spelled Adan de Givenci, Givenci, Gevanche, or Gievenci (fl. 1230–1268) was a trouvère, probably from Givenchy, who was active in and around Arras.

== Identity and career ==
Adam appears in charters of May and July 1230 as a clerk of the Bishop of Arras. He was still serving in the household of the bishop in 1232. In 1243 he was named as a priest and chaplain to the bishop. In 1245 he was the doyen of Lens.

He is assumed to have known the poet-composers Pierre de Corbie, Guillaume le Vinier and Jehan Bretel because he engages in one jeu-parti with Guillaume le Vinier in which Pierre is called as a witness, and another with a 'Jehan', who is assumed to be the prolific jeu-parti writer Jehan Bretel.

His songs survive mainly in MSS M (the chansonnier du roi) and T (the chansonnier de noailles), except for RS1164 which is additionally in MS a and the two jeux partis, which are more widely copied. Six other poems survive attributed to him, all with melodies. Two of these are chansons avec des refrains and two further are descorts.

== Songs with music ==
Eight songs survive attributed to Adam in the index of MS M and all have music in at least one source. The RS numbers given here are those of the standard catalogue. In MS M, both in the index and in the main body, they occur in the order: RS1164, RS1443, RS1947, RS912, RS1660, RS1085, RS2018, and RS205. The first five songs occur in the same order in MS T, although the final three are found (in a similarly ordered group) earlier in the manuscript.

=== Songs ===
- Mar vi loial voloir et jalousie (RS1164). In MSS M, T, and fol.66v–67r in MS a. The copy in M is damaged by the removal of the initial at the opening; the version in MS a has empty staves.
- Si com fortune d’amour (RS1947). The same melody for this song is found in MSS M and T.

=== Chansons avec des refrains ===
- Assés plus que d’estre amés (RS912). Copied without staves for the subsequent stanzas' refrains in both M and T.
- Pour li servir en bone foi (RS1660). With music for later stanzas' refrains in MS M (except stanzas 2 and 4, which have empty staves) but with no space for music in the later stanzas' refrains in T.

=== Jeux partis ===
- Compains Jehan .i. jeu vous voil partir (RS1443). In MSS M, T, as well as in W and Q, which are sources of work by only Adam de la Halle. Q is a text-only copy without musical notation. Långfors suggests the inclusion in Q and W is mistaken or opportunistic, on the basis of the naming of 'Adam' by the respondent; he believes the attribution in M and T (which have no pieces by Adam de la Halle) is correct. The 'Jehan' is assumed by Långfors to be Jehan Bretel. The dilemma posed by Adam is which of two equally attractive ladies Jehan would choose: one who has never loved or one who is experienced in love? Jehan opts for the latter. The melody in M and T is similar but the one in W is different.
- Amis Guillaume, ainc si sage ne vi (RS1085). With Guillaume le Vinier, found in MSS M, T, A, fol. 136r–v in MS a, and fol.140v (formerly 150v)in MS b. MS b is a text-only MS without musical notation. The dilemma posed asks whether a consummated love that soon fails or a hoped-for love that is never realised is better. Guillaume opts for the latter. The melody in A differs from that found (albeit in quite varied versions) in the other three sources notated MSS.

=== Descorts ===
- Trop ai coustumiere amours (RS2018). In MSS M and T.
- La douce accordance (RS205). Different melodies in MSS M and T. The T melody is incomplete at the end. The MS M melody is copied in a slightly later hand, in mensural notation, and is shared with another late addition to M, the Marian song Iam mundus ornatur.
