= Thibaut d'Amiens (trouvère) =

Start of J'ai un cuer mout lait in trouvère chansonnier i, with its notated melody

Thibaut d'Amiens (or Tybaut d'Amiens) was a trouvère active around the year 1200. He was probably a native of Amiens, but nothing about his life is known.

Thibaut is known for a single song, a prayer to the Virgin Mary (Priere à la Vierge or à Nostre Dame). Its incipit is J'ai un cuer mout lait (or trop lent). It is found in at least sixteen manuscripts. In a single case each it is attributed to Richard de Fournival, Gautier de Coinci and Philip the Chancellor, which attributions are rejected. The text was sometimes transmitted without music, as in Dublin, Trinity College Library, 432. In its original form, it had 26 stanzas and Thibaut names himself in the final one, but there is significant variation in the manuscripts. It was popular and influential. Stephen of Bourbon, in his collection of sermon exempla, Tractatus de diversis materiis praedicabilibus, in the chapter De ociocitate, contains an anecdote about the conversion of Guerric, the first prior of the Dominican Order in Metz, wherein he hears the following lines sung in French in the streets of Paris:

Tempus vadit,
et ego nil feci
Tempus venit,
et ego nil operor.

Translation:

Time slips by,
Leaving the world its toys;
Time slips by;
And we do nothing, my boys.

The first two lines correspond to lines 4–5 of Thibaut, with the next two being additions by the preacher singer the song:

Et li tens s'en vait
Et je n'ai riens fait

Text without music in chansonnier S

In one manuscript—Bruxelles. Bibliothèque royale de Belgique, 10392—a 15th-century note has been added identifying the poet as Thibaut d'Amiens, the archbishop of Rouen from 1222 to 1229. This identification is plausible, but there was also a canonist of the same name who lived in the early 13th century and is also a candidate for the trouvère.
