= Corby (disambiguation) =

Corby may refer to:

== Places ==
- Corby, Northamptonshire, England, a town
  - Borough of Corby, a former district that contained the town
  - Corby (UK Parliament constituency)
- Corby (crater), on Mars
- Corby Glen, England, a village in Lincolnshire, England
- Corby Farm Complex, near Honeoye Falls, New York, United States; on the National Register of Historic Places
- Corby Hill, Great Corby and Little Corby, Cumbria, England

== People ==
- Corby (surname)
- Corby Davidson (born 1969), Dallas,_Texas sports radio host and yuck monkey on KTCK
- Corby Kummer (born c. 1956), American food writer and restaurant critic
- Corb Lund (born 1969), Canadian Country music singer, born Corby Clark Marinus Lund
- Fernando J. Corbató (born 1926), American computer scientist nicknamed "Corby"

== In business ==
- Samsung Corby, a telephone
- Corby trouser press, an electrical appliance
- Corby Spirit and Wine, a Canadian alcohol company

== Other uses ==
- Corby Castle, Cumbria, England, an ancestral home of the Howard family
- Corby Bridge, Cumbria, England, a railway viaduct
- "Corby", a Series C episode of the television series QI (2005)

== See also ==
- Corbie
