= Chardo =

Chardo may refer to:

- Chardon de Croisilles, a French trouvère
- Roman Catholic Kshatriya, a Konkani Catholic caste
