= Moniot de Paris =

Moniot de Paris (fl. post-1250) was a trouvère and probably the same person as the Monniot who wrote the Dit de fortune in 1278. He was once thought to have flourished around 1200, but his dates have been pushed back.

Moniot wrote nine surviving pieces: three pastourelles, one chanson de rencontre, one chanson de la malmariée, and four enigmatic rotrouenges that are not of the grand chant variety. Throughout, his work represents a blurring of the traditional boundaries between genres. One modern scholar, J. Frappier, has gone so far as to identify in him a new conception of courtly love: une courtoisie embourgeoisée (a bourgeoisie courtliness). Moniot represents a "low style" or "less refined lyricism". His themes, both lyric and musical, are light in tone. He uses refrains (such as the onomatopoeic "Vadu, vadu, vadu, va!") in nearly all his works and his melodies are simple in the extreme, with repeated notes, repeated phrases, and small intervals. These melodies were popular nonetheless: Moniot reused one and four of them have later contrafacta.

== Poems ==
- A une ajournee
- Au nouvel (or nouviau) tens que nest la violete
- Je chevauchoie l'autrier
- L'autrier par un matinet
- Li tens qui reverdoie
- Lonc tens ai mon tens usé
- Pour mon cuer releecier
- Quant je oi chanter l'alouete
- Qui veut amours maintenir
