= Lai (poetic form) =

Type of lyrical, narrative poem

A lai (or lay lyrique, "lyric lay", to distinguish it from a lai breton) is a lyrical, narrative poem written in octosyllabic couplets that often deals with tales of adventure and romance. Lais were mainly composed in France and Germany, during the 13th and 14th centuries. The English term lay is a 13th-century loan from Old French lai. The origin of the French term itself is unclear; perhaps it is itself a loan from German Leich (reflected in archaic or dialectal English lake, "sport, play" and in modern Swedish (att leka = to play). The terms note, nota and notula (as used by Johannes de Grocheio) appear to have been synonyms for lai.

The poetic form of the lai usually has several stanzas, none of which have the same form. As a result, the accompanying music consists of sections which do not repeat. This distinguishes the lai from other common types of musically important verse of the period (for example, the rondeau and the ballade). Towards the end of its development in the 14th century, some lais repeat stanzas, but usually only in the longer examples. There is one very late example of a lai, written to mourn the defeat of the French at the Battle of Agincourt (1415), (Lay de la guerre, by Pierre de Nesson) but no music for it survives.

There are four lais in the Roman de Fauvel, all of them anonymous. The lai reached its highest level of development as a musical and poetic form in the work of Guillaume de Machaut; 19 separate lais by this 14th-century ars nova composer survive, and they are among his most sophisticated and highly developed secular compositions.

== Composers of lais ==
French composers

- Adam de Givenchi
- Charles I of Anjou
- Charles I, Duke of Orléans
- Gautier de Coincy
- Gautier de Dargies
- Guillaume de Machaut
- Guillaume li Vinier
- Marie de France
- Philip the Chancellor
- Philippe de Vitry (uncertain; works attributed to him may be anonymous)
- Thomas Herier

German composers

- Walther von der Vogelweide
- Der Tannhäuser (wrote 6 Leiche)
- Rudolf von Rotenburg (5)
- Ulrich von Winterstetten (5)
- Konrad von Würzburg (>1)
- Der von Gliers (>1)
- Johannes Hadlaub (>1)
- Heinrich Frauenlob (>1)
- Ulrich von Gutenburg (1)

== See also ==
- Breton lai
- Roundelay § Etymology
- Virelai
- Laisse
