= Ernoul Caupain =

Ernoul Caupain was a trouvère, probably active in the mid-thirteenth century. Two pastourelles, a chanson courtoise, and a religious poem have survived of his work, although one of the pastourelles has conflicting attributions in the two sources and probably is not his. His works are only transmitted in the trouvère chansonniers M and T. Gustav Gröber suggested that he was the same person as the Copin who judged a jeu parti between members of the literary circle flourishing in and around Arras.

Ernoul's poems have relatively long strophes of eleven, twelve, or fifteen lines. He typically uses octosyllables mixed with hexa- or heptasyllabic lines. They are written in what was later termed bar form, a designation from the Meistersinger repertoire. In trouvère studies, this form is usually referred to as pedes-cum-cauda form and expressed as ABABX rather than the AAB of bar form.

== List of works ==
- De l'amour celi sui espris (RS1544; religious song) copied with musical notation in TrouvT (F-Pn fr.12615), starting on f.44r and in TrouvM (F-Pn fr.844), with musical notation, starting on f.172r.
- Entre Godefroi et Robin (RS1377; pastourelle with multiple refrains) copied with musical notation in TrouvT, starting on f.78v.
- Ier main pensis chevauchai (RS73; pastourelle with multiple refrains) copied with musical notation in TrouvT, starting on f.44v and in TrouvM with musical notation, starting on f.99v but ascribed to 'baudes de la kakerie' (i.e. [Baude de la Quariere].
- Quant j'oi chanter ces oiseillons (RS1909; chanson) copied with musical notation in TrouvT, starting on f.78r, and with a different melody in TrouvM, starting on f.172v, with musical notation added later.
