= Thibaut d'Amiens =

Thibaut d'Amiens may refer to:

- Thibaut d'Amiens (trouvère)
- Thibaut d'Amiens (bishop), archbishop of Rouen (1222–1229)
