= Trouvère =

Term for a medieval French poet-composer

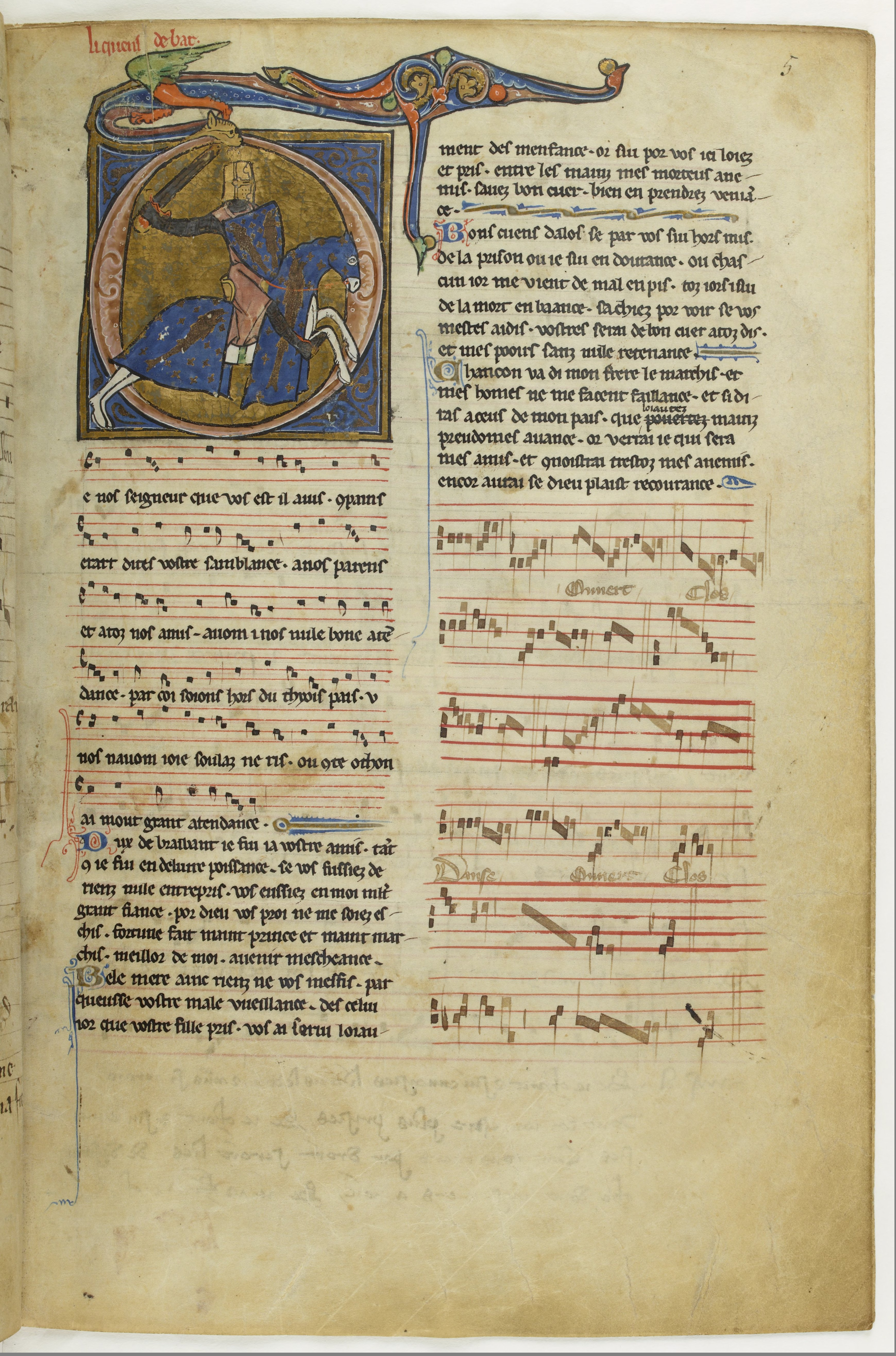
Trouvère song in the 13th century Chansonnier du Roi, BnF fr. 844, fol. 5r. The trouvère depicted is Count Theobald II of Bar.

Trouvère (/truːˈvɛər/, French: [tʁuvɛʁ]), sometimes spelled trouveur (/truːˈvɜːr/, French: [tʁuvœʁ]), is the Northern French (langue d'oïl) form of the Occitan (langue d'oc) word trobador, the precursor of the modern French word troubadour. Trouvère refers to poet-composers who were roughly contemporary with and influenced by the trobadors, both composing and performing lyric poetry during the High Middle Ages, but while the trobadors composed and performed in Old Occitan, the trouvères used the northern dialects of France. One of the first known trouvères was Chrétien de Troyes (fl. 1160s–1180s) and the trouvères continued to flourish until about 1300. Some 2130 trouvère poems have survived; of these, at least two-thirds have melodies.

== Etymology ==
The etymology of the word troubadour and its cognates in other languages is disputed, but may be related to trobar, "to compose, to discuss, to invent", cognate with Old French trover, "to compose something in verses". (For a discussion of the etymology of the word troubadour and its cognates, see Troubadour § Etymology.)

== History ==
The modern popular image of the troubadour or trouvère is that of the itinerant musician wandering from town to town, lute on his back. Itinerant singers and performers existed, but they were called jongleurs and minstrels—professional entertainers, usually of somewhat lower social status. Troubadours and trouvères, on the other hand, were often of higher social class and did not typically rely on music making as a trade. They were either poets and composers who were supported by the aristocracy or, just as often, were aristocrats themselves, for whom the creation and performance of music was part of the courtly tradition. However, these distinctions were not always clear, and varied by community.

The texts of these songs are a natural reflection of the society that created them. They often revolve around idealized treatments of courtly love ("fine amors", see grand chant) and religious devotion, although many can be found that take a more frank, earthy look at love. Other genres well represented in the surviving works by trouvères are debate songs known as jeu-partis as well as pastourelles, dance songs, and chansons de femme (songs with a female perspective).

Johannes de Grocheio, a Parisian musical theorist of the early 14th century, believed that the most elevated trouvère songs, known as grand chants, inspired kings and noblemen to do great things: "This kind of song is customarily composed by kings and nobles and sung in the presence of kings and princes of the land so that it may move their minds to boldness and fortitude, magnanimity and liberality...".

The surviving music by trouvères is vocal music that is monophonic and mostly syllabic, meaning that only a single melodic line was notated, and the text is presented simply with only one or a few notes per syllable of text. Rhythm is not recorded for most songs, and no instrumentation is specified. Because narrative and visual evidence tells us that instruments were widely used, it is likely that instruments were used in some cases, but trouvère songs were likely also performed unaccompanied. Modern scholars and performers take a variety of approaches to rhythmic interpretation, including using a free rhythmic approach or relatively equal note values throughout, deriving rhythmic ideas from the text, or applying rhythmic modes found in contemporary polyphonic music.

Most trouvère music is strophic, with a single verse of music repeated with multiple verses of text. In some, a repeated one- or two-line refrain is used in each stanza. Some trouvere refrains were also used across multiple different songs and other literary works, creating a network of references.

== Women trouvères ==
There are no extant trouvère songs "in which a woman explicitly claims authorship by naming herself". There are, however, poems in which a woman is named as the author in a rubric or table of contents in a manuscript and others in which a female voice, named or unnamed, participates in a jeu parti (debate poem). Many others are written from a woman's point of view and may have been written by women authors. While early scholars often denied the existence of women trouvères, since the 1980s, their existence has been generally accepted and an effort has been made to identify anonymous songs composed by women on the basis of lyrics and contextual clues. The latest monograph on women trouvères identifies eight known by name or title, plus a further six named women who judged jeux partis.

The term troveresse has sometimes been used for women trouvères. The lexicographer Frédéric Godefroy defined the Old French word trouverresse as "she who composes, invents", citing a manuscript of a continuation of Robert of Auxerre's Chronicle. The spelling troverresse also appears in the late 14th-century French–Latin dictionary Aalma, where it corresponds to Latin inuentrix (inventor).

The eight named women trouvères are:

- Blanche of Castile (1188–1252)
- Dame de la Chaucie
- Dame de Gosnai
- Gertrude, Duchess of Lorraine (1205–1225)
- Lorete
- Margot
- Maroie de Diergnau
- Sainte des Prez

The six named women who judged jeux partis are:

- Comtesse de Linaige
- Mahaut de Commercy
- Béatrice de Courtrai
- Dame de Fouencamp
- Dame de Danemoi
- Demisele Oede

There is one "fanciful" attribution of a song, Chanterai por mon corage, probably by a male trouvère, to the Dame du Fayel, who was in fact a character in Roman du châtelain de Coucy et de la dame de Fayel.

== List of trouvères ==
This is only a partial list. There are perhaps as many as 256 named male trouvères.

- Adam de Givenchi
- Adam de la Halle (c. 1240–88)
- Aimeri
- Alart de Chans
- Andrieu Contredit d'Arras († c. 1248)
- Andrieu de Paris
- Andrieu d'Ouche
- Aubertin d'Airaines
- Aubin de Sézanne
- Audefroi le Bastart (fl. c. 1200–1230)
- Avoué de Betune
- Baude au Grenon
- Baude de la Quarriere
- Baudouyn
- Baudouin des Auteus
- Bernart de la Ferté
- Bertran
- Bestournés
- Blondel de Nesle (fl. c. 1175–1210)
- Bouchart de Marli
- Brunel de Tours
- Burnekin
- Carasaus
- Chancelier de Paris
- Chanoine de Saint Quentin
- Chapelain de Laon
- Chardon de Croisilles
- Chastelain d'Arras
- Chastelain de Couci (fl. c. 1170–1203; †1203)
- Charles d'Anjou
- Chrétien de Troyes (fl. 1160s–80s)
- Coins de Galles
- Colart le Boutellier
- Colart le Changeur
- Colin de Champiaus
- Colin Muset (fl. c. 1200–50)
- Colin Pansace
- Comte de la Marche
- Conon de Béthune (fl. c. 1180–c. 1220; †1220)
- Coupart
- Duc de Brabant
- Ernoul Caupain
- Ernoul le Vieux
- Étienne de Meaux
- Eustache le Peintre de Reims
- Ferri de Ferrieres
- Gace Brulé (c. 1159–after 1212)
- Gaidifer d'Avion
- Gamart de Vilers
- Garnier d'Arches
- Gasteblé
- Gautier de Bregi
- Gautier de Coincy (1177/8–1236)
- Gautier de Dargies (c. 1170–after 1236)
- Gautier d'Espinal († before July 1272)
- Gautier de Formeseles
- Gautier de Murs
- Gautier de Navilly
- Gavaron Grazelle
- Geoffrey II of Brittany
- Geoffroi de Barale
- Gerardin de Boulogne
- Gerart de Valenciennes
- Gerbert
- Gillebert de Berneville (fl. c. 1255)
- Gilles de Beaumont
- Gilles de la Croix
- Gilles de Vieux-Maisons
- Gilles le Vinier
- Girart d'Amiens
- Gobin de Reims
- Godefroi de Chastillon
- Gontier de Soignies (fl. c. 1180–1220)
- Gui
- Guibert Kaukesel
- Guichart
- Guillaume de Betune
- Guillaume d'Amiens
- Guillaume le Vinier (fl. c. 1220–45; †1245)
- Guillaume Veau
- Guiot de Dijon (fl. c. 1200–30)
- Guiot de Brunoi
- Guiot de Provins
- Henri Amion
- Henri d'Andeli
- Henri de Lacy (1249–1311)
- Herbert
- Hue de la Ferté
- Hue le Chastelain d'Arras
- Hue le Marronier
- Hugues de Berzé (fl. c. 1150–1220)
- Huitace de Fontaines
- Huon d'Oisi
- Huon de Saint-Quentin
- Jaque d'Amiens
- Jacques de Billi
- Jacques Bretel
- Jacques de Cambrai
- Jacques de Cysoing
- Jaque de Dampierre
- Jaque de Dosti
- Jaque de Hesdin
- Jaque d'Ostun
- Jacques le Vinier
- Jaquemin de la Vente
- Jehan Acart de Hesdin
- Jehan d'Archis
- Jehan d'Auxerre
- Jehan Baillehaut
- Jehan de Bar
- Jean Bodel
- Jehan de Braine
- Jehan Bretel (c. 1200–1272)
- Jean Brisebarre
- Jehan le Charpentier
- Jehan de Chison
- Jehan le Cuvelier d'Arras (fl. c. 1240–70)
- Jehan Erart († c. 1259)
- Jehan d'Esquiri
- Jehan d'Estruen
- Jehan d'Eu
- Jehan de la Fontaine
- Jehan Fremaux
- Jehan de Grieviler
- Jehan Legier
- Jehan de Louvois
- Jehan de Maisons
- Jehan de Marli
- Jehan de Nuevile
- Jehan l'Orgueneur
- Jehan le Petit
- Jean Renart
- Jehan de Renti
- Jehan de Roucy
- Jehan Simon
- Jehan le Taboureur
- Jehan le Teinturier
- Jehan de la Tornele
- Jehan de Tournai
- Jehan de Trie
- Jehan de Vergelai
- Jehannot de l'Escurel
- Jehannot Paon
- Jehennins
- Jocelin de Bruges
- Jocelin de Dijon
- Jofroi Baré
- Lambert l'Aveugle
- Lambert Ferri
- Mahieu de Gant
- Mahieu le Juif
- Mahieu le Tailleur
- Martin le Beguin
- Martinet
- Maurice de Craon
- Michel
- Moine d'Arras
- Moine de Saint Denis
- Moniot d'Arras (fl. c. 1250–75)
- Moniot de Paris (fl. c. 1250–1278)
- Muse en Bourse
- Nevelon Amion
- Nicole de Margival
- Oede de la Couroierie
- Oudart de Laceni
- Perrin d'Angicourt (fl. c. 1245–50)
- Perron
- Perrot de Douai
- Perrot de Neele
- Phelipot Paon
- Philippe de Nanteuil
- Philippe de Novare
- Philippe de Remi (c. 1205–c. 1265)
- Philippot Verdiere
- Pierre de Beaumarchais
- Pierre le Borgne
- Pierre de la Chapele
- Pierre de Corbie
- Pierre de Craon
- Pierre de Molins
- Pierrekin de la Coupele
- Prieus de Bouloigne
- Prince de la Morée
- Quare
- Quens de Bretaigne
- Raoul de Beauvais
- Raoul de Ferier
- Raoul de Soissons (c. 1215–1272)
- Renas
- Renaut de Beaujeu
- Renaut de Hollande
- Renaut de Sableuil
- René de Trie
- Renier de Quarignon
- Richard de Fournival (1201–c. 1260)
- Richart de Semilli
- Richard I of England
- Robert de Blois
- Robert del Caisnoi
- Robert de Castel
- Robert de Dommart
- Robert li Dus
- Robert Mauvoisin
- Robert de Memberoles
- Robert de Reims
- Robert de la Piere
- Robin de Compiegne
- Rogier
- Roger d'Andeli
- Rogeret de Cambrai
- Roi d'Aragon
- Rolant
- Rolant de Reims
- Rufin de Corbie
- Rutebeuf
- Sandrart Certain
- Sauvage d'Arraz
- Sauvage de Betune
- Sauvale Cosset
- Simart de Boncourt
- Simon d'Authie
- Thibaut d'Amiens
- Thibaut de Bar
- Thibaut de Blazon
- Thibaut de Nangis
- Thibaut de Navarre (1201–53)
- Thierri de Soissons
- Tierri
- Thomas Herier
- Trésorier d'Aire
- Trésorier de Lille
- Vidame de Chartres
- Vielart de Corbie
- Vilain d'Arras
- Walter of Bibbesworth

== List of chansonniers ==
The following is a list of chansonniers containing trouvère texts and/or music listed by sigla (usually a letter). It is not a complete listing of manuscripts containing trouvère texts. The same manuscripts may be signified by different sigla in different contexts (i.e., troubadours or motets) if it contains works of different kinds. These sigla are standard in trouvère studies.

- A — Arras, Bibliothèque municipale, 657, the Chansonnier d'Arras
- B — Bern, Stadt- und Universitätsbibliothek, 231
- C — Bern, Stadt- und Universitätsbibliothek, 389
- D — Frankfurt, Universitätsbibliothek, lat. fol. 7
- E — London, British Library, Egerton 274
- F — Florence, Biblioteca Medicea-Laurenziana, Pluteus 29.1
- G — London, Lambeth Palace, Misc. Rolls 1435
- H — Modena, Biblioteca Estense, α.R.4.4
- I — Oxford, Bodleian Library, Douce 308
- K — Paris, Bibliothèque de l'Arsenal, 5198, the Chansonnier de l'Arsenal
- L — Paris, Bibliothèque nationale de France, fr. 765
- M — Paris, Bibliothèque nationale de France, fr. 844, the Chansonnier du Roi
- N — Paris, Bibliothèque nationale de France, fr. 845
- O — Paris, Bibliothèque nationale de France, fr. 846, the Chansonnier Cangé
- P — Paris, Bibliothèque nationale de France, fr. 847
- Q — Paris, Bibliothèque nationale de France, fr. 1109
- R — Paris, Bibliothèque nationale de France, fr. 1591
- S — Paris, Bibliothèque nationale de France, fr. 12581
- T — Paris, Bibliothèque nationale de France, fr. 12615, the Chansonnier de Noailles
- U — Paris, Bibliothèque nationale de France, fr. 20050, the Chansonnier St-Germain-des-Prés
- V — Paris, Bibliothèque nationale de France, fr. 24406
- W — Paris, Bibliothèque nationale de France, fr. 25566
- X — Paris, Bibliothèque nationale de France, nouv. acq. fr. 1050, the Chansonnier de Clairambault
- Z — Siena, Biblioteca Comunale, H.X.36
- a — Rome, Biblioteca Apostolica Vaticana, Reg. Lat. 1490
- b — Rome, Biblioteca Apostolica Vaticana, Reg. Lat. 1522
- c — Bern, Stadt- und Universitätsbibliothek, A. 95
- d — Cambridge, Corpus Christi College, 450
- f — Montpellier, Faculté de Médecine, 236
- g — Paris, Bibliothèque nationale de France, fr. 1593
- i — Paris, Bibliothèque nationale de France, fr. 12483
- j — Paris, Bibliothèque nationale de France, nouv. acq. fr. 21677
- k — Paris, Bibliothèque nationale de France, fr. 12786
- l — Paris, Bibliothèque nationale de France, fr. 22495
- m — Paris, Bibliothèque nationale de France, lat. 11412
- n — Paris, Bibliothèque nationale de France, lat. 11724
- o — London, British Library, Harley 1717
- p — Pavia, Biblioteca Universitaria, CXXX.E.5
- u — Rome, Biblioteca Apostolica Vaticana, Reg. Lat. 1725
- v — Paris, Bibliothèque nationale de France, fr. 1553
- za — Zagreb, Metropolitan Library, MR 92
- α — Madrid, Biblioteca del Monasterio de El Escorial, S.I.3

== See also ==
- William the Trouvère
- Ashik
- Bard
- Bhāts
- Filí
- Griot
- Minstrels
- Skald
- Dziady (wandering beggars)
- Lirnyk
- Troubadour

== Bibliography ==
- Akehurst, F. R. P.; Davis, Judith M., eds. (1995). A Handbook of the Troubadours. Berkeley: University of California Press. ISBN 0-520-07976-0.
- Butterfield, Ardis (1997). "Monophonic song: questions of category". Companion to Medieval & Renaissance Music. Oxford University Press. ISBN 0-19-816540-4.
- Doss-Quinby, Eglal; Tasker Grimbert, Joan; Pfeffer, Wendy; Aubrey, Elizabeth (2001). Songs of the Women Trouvères. New Haven: Yale UP. ISBN 978-0-300-08413-9.
- Linker, Robert White (1979). A Bibliography of Old French Lyrics. Romance Monographs.
- Lyrics of the Troubadours and Trouvères: An Anthology and a History. Translated by Goldin, Frederick. Gloucester, MA: Peter Smith. 1983. ISBN 0-8446-5036-6..
- Hasenohr, Geneviève; Zink, Michel, eds. (1992). Dictionnaire des lettres françaises: Le Moyen Age. Collection: La Pochothèque (in French). Paris: Fayard. ISBN 2-253-05662-6.
- O'Neill, Mary (2006). Courtly Love Songs of Medieval France: Transmission and Style in the Trouvère Repertoire. Oxford: Oxford University Press. ISBN 0-19-816547-1.
- Page, Christopher (November 1997). "Listening to the trouvères". Early Music. 25 (4): 639–660. doi:10.1093/earlyj/XXV.4.639. JSTOR 3128410.
