= Hue de la Ferté =

French trouvère

Hue de la Ferté (fl. 1220–35) was a French trouvère who wrote three serventois attacking the regency of Blanche of Castile during the minority of Louis IX. He maligns Blanche's partiality to foreigners and singles out Theobald I of Navarre, another trouvère, as unworthy of her support. Hue was a supporter of Pierre de Dreux, Duke of Brittany.

His poem En talent ai que je die is modelled after En chantant m'estuet complaindré (1228–30) by Gace Brulé. Its simple melody is of the form ABABCDD¹D². He modelled Je chantasse volentiers liement after Je chantasse volentiers liement (1228–30) by Chastelain de Couci and Or somes a ce venu after the anonymous Quant li oisellon menu.
