= Jocelin de Dijon =

Jocelin de Dijon (fl. 1200–25) was an Old French trouvère, presumably from Dijon. Two songs survive attributed to his full name and two further songs survive (without music) credited to an otherwise unidentifiable "Jocelin" in the Berne Chansonnier (CH-BEsu 389 = Trouvère chansonnier C) which may be the work of Jocelin de Dijon.

Of the two pieces securely attributed to him, only A l'entree del dous commencement can be confidently dated. It was written around 1220 and refers to the absence of a certain Andriu and the Seigneur d'Arsie. It is independently known that André III de Montbard and Jehan I, Seigneur d'Arcis-sur-Aube, joined the Fifth Crusade in 1218; Jehan never returned. Whereas the poetry is divided into four- and five-line strophes, the melody in the Noailles Chansonnier (F-Pn fr.12615 = Trouvère chansonnier T) is divided into five- and four-line groups (i.e., in opposite order). Karp claims it was used as a model for the anonymous song Vers Dieu mes fais desirrans sui forment (RS677), found in F-Pn fr.2193, f.11, although this is an assumption based on similar versification, since the ostensible melody transmitted in that source is a fictitious form of musical notation and does not give the real melody.

== Works List ==
=== Securely attributed ===
- A l'entree del dous comencement (RS647), attributed in Trouvère chansonniers M (F-Pn fr.844), f.166v and T, ff.94r-v (both with musical notation), and anonymously in H, f.221 (I-MOe R 4, 4; as text only) and U (F-Pn fr.20050), ff.60v-61r (with musical notation). In C, f.4 the song (copied with empty staves) is attributed to 'Gios Dijon'.
- Par un matinee en mai (RS95), attributed in Trouvère chansonniers M, f.166r-v and T, f.94r (both with musical notation) and transmitted anonymously in U, f.68v and C, f.190r (both of which have staves above the first stanza which are empty of notes).

=== Potential works ===
- Or chanterai com hom desesperés (RS921), a pastourelle attributed to 'Joselins') in C, f.169r. Blank staves above stanza 1.
- Quant j'oi chanter l'alouete / Et ces... (RS968), a pastourelle attributed to 'Jocelins') in C, f.195r. Blank staves above stanza 1. The text (except for the fifth stanza) is also in the pastourelle subsection of GB-Ob Douce 308, f.205v.
