= Corby (surname) =

- Pronunciation: /ˈkɔːrbi/
- Language: English

Origin
- Languages: 1. Old Norse; 2. Old Irish/Old Norse; 3. Old French
- Origin: 1. 2. Corby (various places); 3. corb
- Derivation: 1. Old Norse: Kori + býr 2. Old Irish: Corc + býr 3. Latin: corvus
- Meaning: 1. 'Kori's farm' 2. 'Corc's farm' 3. 'raven'

Corby is a surname. Notable people with the surname include:

- Ambrose Corbie or Corby (1604–1649), English Jesuit, teacher and author
- Colleen Corby (born 1947), American model
- Ellen Corby (1911–1999), American actress best known for playing Grandma Walton on the television show The Waltons
- Gary Corby (born 1963), Australian novelist
- Henry Corby (1806–1881), Canadian businessman and politician
- Henry Corby Jr. (1851–1917), Canadian businessman and politician, son of the above
- John George Howard (1803–1890), born John Corby, English-born Canadian architect, civil engineer and surveyor
- Kevin Corby (cricketer) (born 1959), English cricketer
- Kevin Corby (soccer) (born 1988), American soccer player
- Kevin Corby (politician) (?–2006), Australian politician
- Matt Corby (born 1990), Australian singer
- Michael Corby (born 1951), British rock guitarist
- Peter Corby (1924–2021), British inventor
- Schapelle Corby (born 1977), Australian convicted of drug smuggling in 2005
- William Corby (1833–1897), President of the University of Notre Dame and chaplain to the Irish Brigade during the American Civil War
