= Pierre Aubry (musicologist) =

French musicologist (1874–1910)

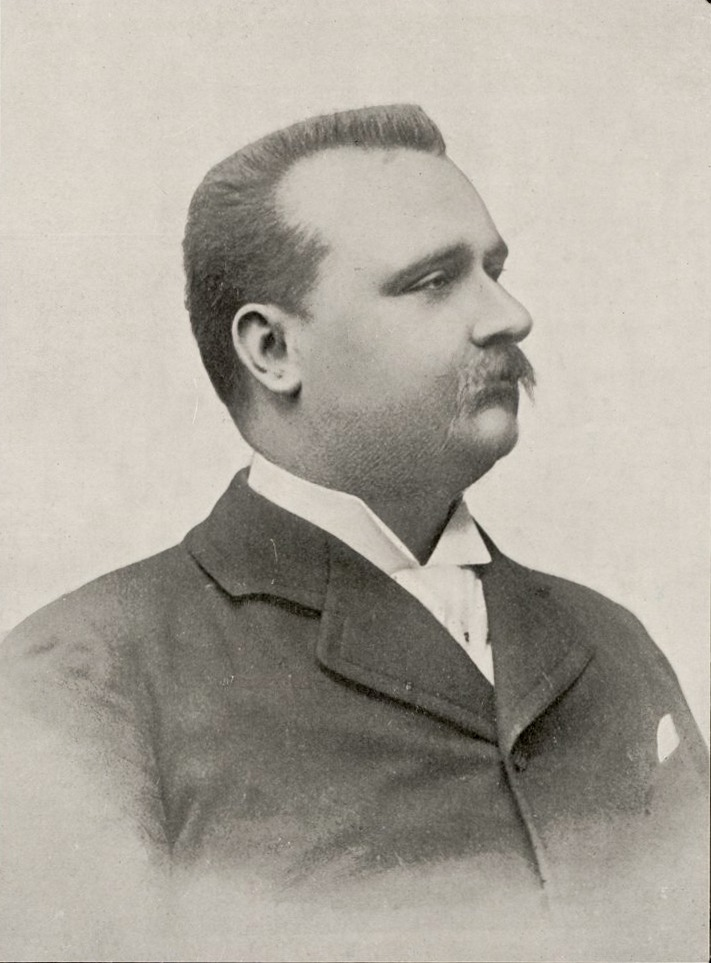
Pierre Aubry

Pierre Aubry (14 February 1874 in Paris – 31 August 1910 in Dieppe) was a French musicologist (according to professor of music and medieval studies, John Haines, Aubry was the first to use the term musicologie.) who specialized in secular monophony, musical palaeography and the music of the 13th century.

He is particularly known for applying the modal rhythms of Franconian theory to the repertoire trouvère and troubadour songs. The Alsatian scholar Johann-Baptist (later Jean-Baptist) Beck claimed plagiarism and Aubry called for a trial, which resulted in a judgment in Beck's favor. Aubry's premature death by suicide was shrouded in rumors of a duel, Beck himself believing the fatal stab wound was an accident while practicing for combat.

== Selected publications ==
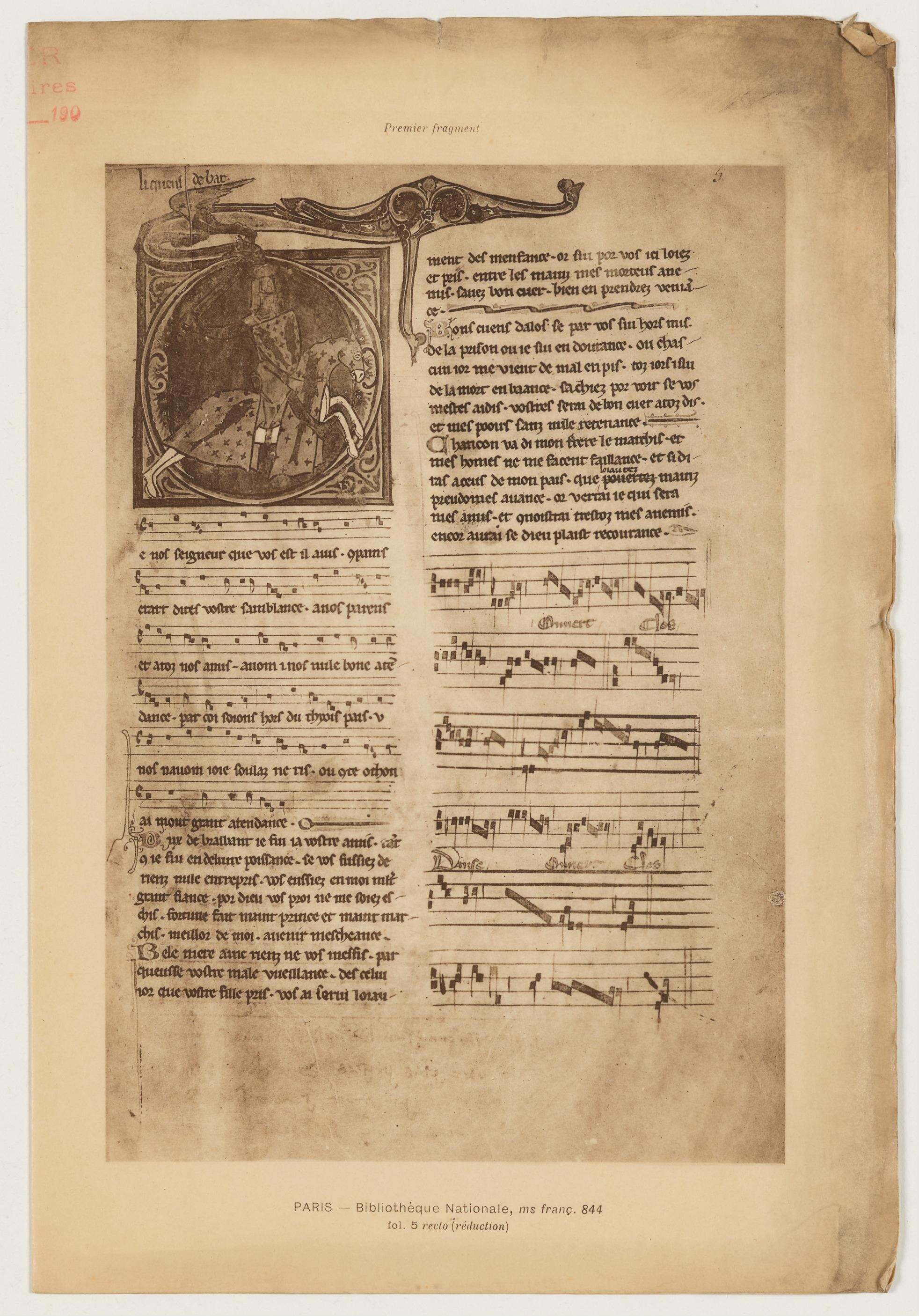
Monodie vocale accompagnée et monodie instrumentale (1896-1910).

- Les Proses d'Adam de Saint-Victor. Paris: H. Welter. 1900. (with Abbé E. Misset, about Adam of Saint Victor)
- Lais et descorts français du xiiie siècle] (1901)
- Souvenir d'une mission d'études musicales en Arménie (1902)
- Au Turkestan: note sur quelques habitudes musicales chez les Tadjiks et chez les Sartes (1905)
- Un "explicit" en musique du roman de Fauvel (1906)
- Le roman de Fauvel: reproduction photographique du manuscrit français 146 de la Bibliothèque Nationale de Paris (1907)
- Cent motets du XIIIe siècle, publiés d'après le manuscrit Ed.IV.6 de Bamberg (1908)
- Trouvères et troubadours] (1909, English translation 1914)
- Le chansonnier de l'Arsenal (1910, with A. Jeanroy)
