= Dame de Gosnai =

French trouvère

Dame de Gosnai (fl. 1200s CE) was a woman trouvère. She was a member of the Puy d'Arras, a society dedicated to competitions between courtly trouvères in 13th century Arras (in modern-day France).

Her most famous work is a jeu-parti (a composition, usually in the form of a debate, written by two trouvères as interlocutors, who compose alternating verses) known "Dame de Gosnai, gardez". Her interlocutor was the trouvère Gillebert de Berneville.

== Bibliography ==
- Berger, Roger (1981). Littérature et société arrageoises au XIIIe siècle: Les chansons et dits artésiens. Arras: Commission Départementale des Monuments Historiques du Pas-de-Calais.
- Doss-Quinby, Eglal; Joan Tasker Grimbert; Wendy Pfeffer; Elizabeth Aubrey (2001). Songs of the Women Trouvères. New Haven: Yale UP. ISBN 0-300-08413-7.
