= Pierre de Nesson =

French poet

Pierre de Nesson (born 1384, date of death unknown) was a French poet. He was born in Aigueperse, Puy-de-Dôme, France.

His major work is the Vigiles des Morts, or Paraphrase des IX leçons de Job. It is commentary on the Biblical Book of Job, in outspoken verses. Other works are L'hommage à la Vierge, and the Lay de guerre, a lai written after the Battle of Agincourt, a riposte to the Lay de paix of his contemporary Alain Chartier.

An extract from the Vigiles des Morts :

Et lors, quand tu trépasseras,
Dès le jour que mort tu seras,
Ton orde chair commencera
À rendre pugnaise pueur.
Que ne gouttes-tu de sueur
Quand tu penses que ce sera ?

== Modern editions ==
- Pierre de Nesson et ses œuvres, A. Piaget and E. Droz, Paris : E. Droz, 1925; facsimile reprint Slatkine, 1977
- Les vigiles des morts, Paris : H. Champion, 2002 ISBN 2-7453-0645-6
