= Guillaume d'Amiens =

French painter

Guillaume painting a coat of arms

Guillaume d'Amiens or Guillaume le Peigneur (floruit late 13th century) was a trouvère and painter from Amiens. All his music is contained in one chansonnier (songbook) of Arras, now manuscript "Latin 1490" in the Bibliotheca Apostolica Vaticana. In it, the rubrics which accompany the songs identify Guillaume as a paigneur, "painter". He may even be the artist who added the large illumination which precedes his songs in the manuscript. The preservation of his rondeaux in a single book is an identical case to that of fellow trouvères Adam de la Halle and Jehannot de l'Escurel. The only reference to Guillaume (the French form of William) outside of the chansonnier is in a list of taxpayers in Amiens in 1301, which mentions a "William the Painter" (Willelmi pictoris in Latin).

Guillaume's musical corpus comprises eight monophonic rondeaux, two chansons d'amour, and one virelai. He also wrote four other lyric poems which do not survive with music. Guillaume's rondeaux and the virelai are typical for the time, although with slight variations in the refrains, perhaps representing how they were actually performed. In "Prendés i garde" an irregularity in the prosody is reflected in an irregularity in the music. His melodies usually emphasize the perfect fifth from D to A.

== List of songs ==
Chansons

- Amours me fait par mon veuil
- Puisque chanters onques nul home aida

Rondeaux

- Amours me maint u cueur
- Dame, pour men lonc sejour
- De ma dame vient
- Hareu! Coument mi manterrai
- Jamais ne serai saous
- Je canterai, faire le doi
- Prendés i garde
- Ses tres dous regers

Virelai

- C'est la fin quoi que nus die, j'amerai
