= Sainte des Prez =

13th-century French writer

Sainte des Prez was a trouvère probably from Le Prés in La Ferté-sous-Jouarre and active in the 13th century.

Nothing is known about her beyond what can be deduced from her name. She shares her toponymic surname with Gui des Prés, named in a chansonnier from Siena as the composer of a song elsewhere attributed to Perrin d'Angicourt and who himself may be identical with Guy des Prés, bishop of Noyon from 1272 to 1296. In 1581, Claude Fauchet included Sainte des Prez in his catalogue of French poets from before 1300.

Sainte probably belonged to the school of trouvères centred on Arras. She wrote a jeu-parti with the otherwise unknown lady of La Chaucie, probably La Chaussée in Crouy-sur-Ourcq. This is her only surviving work. It has Picard dialectal features. She opens the poetic exchange with the line "Que ferai je, dame de la Chaucie" (What shall I do, Lady of Chaucie) by which the song is conventionally known. In her response, the lady (dame) addresses Sainte as damoisele (maiden), meaning unmarried. The subject of their debate is how a woman ought to behave when a man declares his love for her. The older and more experienced married lady recommends letting the man have his say, but Sainte is afraid of being seduced by flattery.
