= Jaque de Dampierre =

Jaque de Dampierre was a thirteenth-century trouvère, possibly from Dampierre-en-Yvelines. He was of the later generation of trouvères. His two works, Cors de si gentil faiture and D'amours naist fruis vertueus, are found in a single manuscript. They both use bar form and the plagal mode.
