= Gobin de Reims =

French composer

Gobin de Reims (Reins) was a thirteenth-century trouvère, most likely from Reims. He possibly wrote two satires against women: On soloit ça en arrier and Pour le tens qui verdoie, both attributed to him in the Chansonnier de l'Arsenal and related manuscripts. Elsewhere, however, Jehan d'Auxerre claims authorship of the second piece. As well, the various manuscripts, which usually differ only slightly, preserve widely divergent melodies of On soloit. In the Chansonnier de l'Arsenal, the melody is syllabic and symmetrical, within the range of a fifth.
