= Carasaus =

French composer

Carasaus (fl. c. 1240–60) was a French trouvère, five of whose works survive. His career can be dated because he dedicates two grand chants (Fine amours m'envoie and Puis que j'ai chançon meüe) to Jehan de Dampierre (died 1259) and another (N'est pas sage qui me tourne a folie) to Henry III of Brabant (reigned 1248–61). Carasaus also dedicated Con amans en desesperance to a certain Berengier, yet unidentified. Besides Fine amours, which has pentasyllables, all of Carasaus's works have only heptasyllables and decasyllables. All his melodies are in bar form; but Pour ce me sui de chanter entremis is also motivic.
