= Ralph of Soissons (trouvère) =

French noble and poet (1210/15 – c. 1270)

Raoul de Soissons (1210/15 – c. 1270) was a French nobleman, Crusader, and trouvère. He was the second son of Raoul le Bon, Count of Soissons, and became the Sire de Coeuvres in 1232. Raoul participated in three Crusades.

== Life ==
In 1239, Raoul joined his lord Peter I, Duke of Brittany, on the crusade of King Theobald I of Navarre. There, he and Peter split off from the main army, split their force in half, and successfully conducted a cattle raid against a Muslim caravan. During a sojourn in the Kingdom of Cyprus he met and wed Alice (died 1246), the queen-mother and a claimant to the Kingdom of Jerusalem, in 1241. In 1243 he returned to France, but joined the Seventh Crusade led by Louis IX in 1248. He is last mentioned on the Eighth Crusade in 1270, and it is usually assumed that he died on that expedition.

== Songs ==
Raoul composed the jeu parti "Sir, loez moi a loisir" with Theobald of Navarre. He also dedicated his "Rois de Navare et sire de Vertu" ('King of Navarre and lord of virtue') to the Navarrese king. (Note: This piece served as a model for Theobald's own piece "Bon rois Thibaut, sire, conseilliez moi" and for "Ma derreniere veul fere en chantant" by Oede de la Couroierie.) Raoul is also mentioned in three envois of Theobald's. Raoul was also the judge of a jeu parti between Henry III of Brabant and Gillebert de Berneville.

In total, seven chansons are attributed to Raoul in various chansonniers. One alone, "E, cuens d’Anjou, on dit par felonie", is uncontested by other attributions, and dedicated to Charles of Anjou. Four, however, are also attributed to Thierri de Soissons, who may be the same person as Raoul. Two more attributions are considered erroneous today. The song "Chançon m'estuet et fere et comencier" served as a model for two anonymous chansons: "Par mainte fois m'ont mesdisant grevé" and "Chanter m'estuet de cele sans targier". But Raoul's most popular piece was doubtless "Quant voi la glaie meure", which was the model for five other works:

- "Deus, je n'os nomer amie" (anonymous)
- "Vierge des cieus, clere et pure" (anonymous)
- "O constantie dignitas" (Adam de la Bassée)
- "Mere, douce creature" (Jaque de Cambrai)
- "Ausi com l'eschaufeure" (possibly Phelipe de Remi)

Raoul also wrote a chanson called "Quant je voi et fueille et flour". All his melodies are written in bar form, with no mensural notation.

== Identification with Thierri ==
Thierri de Soissons (floruit 1230–60) is unknown save for his appearance in the chansonniers. The four songs attributed to both him and Raoul are usually assigned to the latter by modern scholars, who still debate whether the two are different persons. There is no Thierri recorded in the family of the counts of Soissons. The two are mentioned together in one manuscript, but there Thierri occurs in a place where Raoul might have been expected (in a list of attributions from an earlier manuscript).

Two works attributed to Thierri (and not Raoul)—"Destrece de trop amer" and "Quant avril et li biaus estés" (possibly not Thierri's)—are dedicated to Charles of Anjou. Though Thierri's musical settings are unlike those of Raoul, an insufficient number of melodies survives to "permit firm conclusions regarding the existence of two different artistic personalities". Thierri's other pieces are:

- "A la plus sage et a la mieus vaillant"
- "Amis Harchier, cil autre chanteour"
- "Chancon legiere a chanter"
- "Chanter m’estuet pour faire contenance"
- "Se j’ai lonc tens esté en Romanie"
- "Sens et raison et mesure"
- "Helas, or ai je trop duré" (possibly not Thierri's)

== Sources ==
- Karp, Theodore. "Raoul de Soissons." Grove Music Online. Oxford Music Online. Accessed 20 September 2008.
- Karp, Theodore. "Thierri de Soissons." Grove Music Online. Oxford Music Online. Accessed 20 September 2008.
