= Lorete =

Lorete was a trouvère, one of only eight women composers of Old French lyric poetry known by name. She is known only by her given name. Her only known work, preserved in a single manuscript, is Lorete, suer, par amor ("Lorete, sister, in the name of love"), a jeu parti (debate song) between her and an unnamed "sister". It has features of the Lorrain dialect.

Lorete's debate concerns the merits of two men who are seeking to marry her. Lorete prefers the one who is coy and approaches her indirectly through her friends, but her "sister" defends the man who openly declares his love for her, comparing the other man to a sneaky Reynard the Fox. The poem was submitted to the judgement of two other women: the countess of Leiningen, Jeanne d'Aspremont, and her sister, Mahaut, dame of Commercy. These women were well known in trouvère circles and Jacques Bretel records both them at the Tournament of Chauvency in October 1285, although Jeanne was only a countess from 1282 to 1316 and Mahaut the dame of Commercy from 1305 to 1329.
