= Guillaume Veau =

Guillaume Veau was a thirteenth-century French trouvère. Three chansons courtoises are attributed to him in the Vatican manuscript Reg.lat.1490:

- J'ai amé trestout mon vivant
- Meudre achoison n'euc onques de chanter
- S'amours loiaus m'a fait soufrir

The first two of these are unica, that is, they appear in no other source. They both end on a note other than the tonal centre of the first four phrases. The "moderately florid" melodies of all three are written in bar form.

Nothing else is known about Veau.
