= Rotrouenge =

In the Middle Ages, the rotrouenge (Old French) or retroencha (Old Occitan) was a recognised type of lyric poetry, although no existing source defines the genre clearly. There are four conserved troubadour poems, all with refrains and three by Guiraut Riquier with music, that are labelled retronchas in the chansonniers. Six rotrouenges survive, but only one with music, and four of them are attributed to one trouvère, Gontier de Soignies.

Medieval Occitan treatises state that the retroencha always has a refrain, but modern scholars have found no other distinguishing characteristic. Pioneering work in singling out and identifying the rotroencha was made by Alfred Jeanroy. In the twentieth century, the German scholars Friedrich Gennrich and Hans Spanke developed two distinct theories about the textual and melodic form of the rotrouenge, implicitly suggesting in the process that some of the few specimens of lyric labelled as such in the manuscripts are in fact mis-labelled and do not represent the rotrouenge. The French scholar Jean Frappier noted that "we are not absolutely sure that we have any authentic specimens of the rotrouenge", indicating that by the time the term came into use in the late twelfth century it was no more than an archaism ("an attractive old term" in the words of Hendrik van der Werf) and that the original genre may have lost its distinct identity. The following are the only four retroenchas that survive:

- "Si.m vai be ques eu non envei" by Joan Esteve
- "Si chans me pogues valensa" by Guiraut Riquier
- "Pos astres no m'es donatz" by Guiraut Riquier
- "No cugei mais d'esta razo chantar" by Guiraut Riquier

== Bibliography ==
The following bibliography is taken from Hendrik van der Werf:

- P. Bec. La lyrique française au Moyen-Age (XIIe–XIIIe siècles): contribution à une typologie des genres poétiques médiévaux (Paris, 1977–8).
- J. Frappier. La poésie lyrique en France aux XIIe et XIIIe siècles: les auteurs et les genres (Paris, 1960).
- F. Gennrich. Die altfranzösiche Rotrouenge (Halle, 1925).
- F. Gennrich. Grundriss einer Formenlehre des mittelalterlichen Liedes (Halle, 1932), 52ff.
- H. Spanke. Eine altfranzösische Liedersammlung (Halle, 1925), 294ff.
