= Gontier de Soignies =

Medieval trouvère and composer

Gontier de Soignies was a medieval trouvère and composer who was active from around 1180 to 1220.

== Biography ==
Gontier was from the region of Soignies in the County of Hainaut, a region that was then a state of the Holy Roman Empire. His life is mostly unknown, although in his works he alludes to travels in France and Burgundy, as well as the protection of the Count Palatine.

One of his works is mentioned in Le Roman de la rose ou de Guillaume de Dole by Jean Renart.

== Works ==
Thirty-four love songs have been ascribed to Gontier, all of which have been preserved in several manuscripts, although only twenty-seven are generally considered to be his. His poetry is lyrics in the high style of the grand chant.

List of the main songs

- A la joie des oiseaus
- L'an ke li dous chans retentist
- Au tens gent que raverdoie
- Biau m'est quant voi verdir les chans
- Douce amours, ki m'atalente
- Doulerousement comence
- Merci, amors, ore ai mestier
- El mois d'esté que li tens rassoage
- Quant oi el bruel
- Quant oi tentir et bas et haut
- Quant li tens torne a verdure
- Se li oisiel baisent lor chans
- Li tans noveaus et la douçors
- Tant ai mon chant entrelaissié
- Chanter m'estuet de recomens
