= Gautier de Dargies =

French trouvère

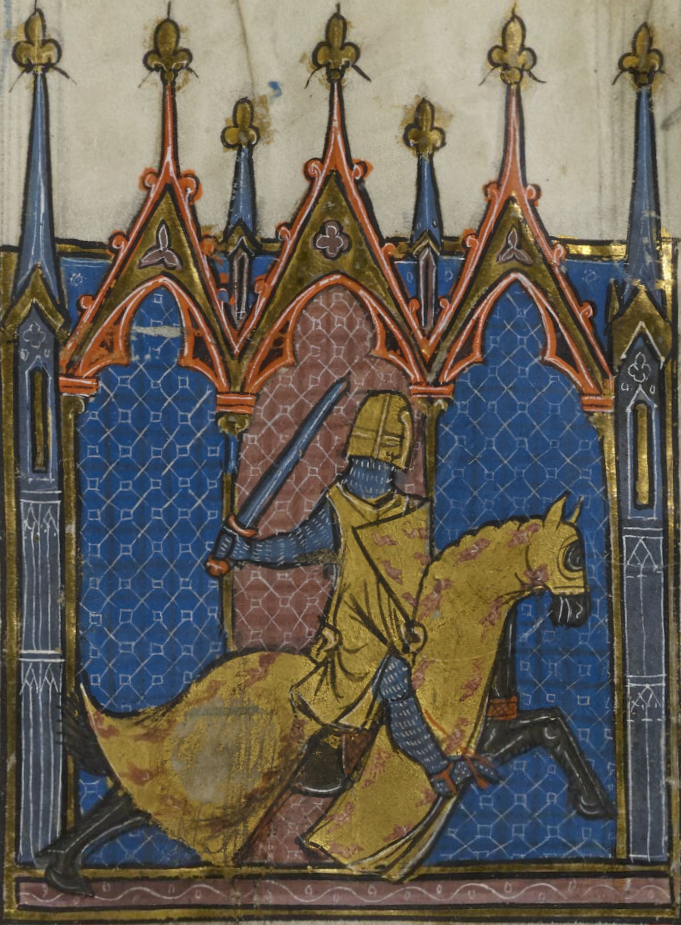
Gautier in the Chansonnier d'Arras

Gautier de Dargies (ca. 1170 – ca. 1240) was a trouvère from Dargies. He was one of the most prolific of the early trouvères; possibly twenty-five of his lyrics survive, twenty-two with accompanying melodies, in sixteen separate chansonniers. He was a major influence on contemporary and later trouvères, and one of the most recorded of medieval vernacular composers. Seventeen chansons courtoises can be assigned indubitably to Gautier, fifteen with music, and three more are probably his, all with music. He imported the Occitan genre of the descort into Old French and left behind three descorts with their melodies. He also participated in two jeux partis, but only one with music. His theme everywhere was courtly love.

Gautier appears in documents of the years 1195, 1202, and 1206 as a vavasour. By 1236, his latest appearance in documents, he had achieved the rank of a knight. His military career is obscure, but he probably participated in the Third Crusade when a young man in 1189. Gautier was the son of Sagalo, himself a younger son or scion of a cadet branch of the Dargies family, since Gautier's coat of arms, depicted in the Chansonnier du Roi and the Chansonnier d'Arras both display martlets of gules not sable, the sign of the main branch of a family. Gautier had three brothers—Rainaut, Drogo, and Villardus—and a wife, Agnes. He apparently knew Gace Brulé, whom he mentions in three poems.

As a poet and musician, Gautier demonstrates skill and originality in his handling of traditional themes, especially metrically. He experiments with asymmetry and lengthiness. Melodically, he is highly individual. Four of his melodies are non-repetitive; in two the musical phrase lengths differ from the lyric phrase lengths, and in all of his surviving pieces he is not constrained to an octave. One melodic setting of his song "Se j’ai esté lonc tens hors du päis" has the largest range of any surviving medieval lyric, the highest note lying a full two octaves above the final.
