= Pierre de Corbie =

Pierre de Corbie (died after 1195) was an early trouvère from the Île-de-France. He is probably the same person as the magister Petrus de Corbeia ("master Peter of Corbie") who served as a canon at Notre Dame d'Arras between 1188 and 1195. Five of the seven surviving songs associated with Pierre are found only the closely related sources TrouvM and TrouvT. The remaining two are in those manuscripts but are also found more widely.

== Songs ==
Songs associated with Pierre include chansons courtoises with and without refrain, a satirical song, and two pastourelles, one of which is a song with changing refrains (a 'chanson avec des refrains'). Less securely attributed is a jeu-parti, listed here for completeness but likely not by him. One of his melodies appears with a contrafact Marian text in other sources. Scholarly diagnosis of different melodies in different sources is sometimes unreliable (details below). The RS numbers given here are the standard catalogue numbers of Raynaud-Spanke.

=== Love songs ===
- Dame, ne vous doit desplaire (RS158): Despite Falck's claim of dissimilarity, the melodies of TrouvM and TrouvT are similar, allowing for a relatively large number of local pitch errors and minor variants.
- En aventure ai chante (RS408): found in TrouvM, TrouvT, TrouvU, TrouvO, and TrouvC, the last of which has empty staves and ascribes it to 'messirez uguez de bregi'. Falck notes the melody in O as different from the other sources.
- Esbahis en lonc voiage (RS46): refrain song found in TrouvM and TrouvT.

=== Pastourelles ===
- Par un ajournant (RS291): the melody with this text found in TrouvM and TrouvT. An anonymous Marian contrafact text set to the melody of this song is found in TrouvP and TrouvX.
- Pensis com fins amourous (RS2041): Chanson avec des refrains in TrouvM and TrouvT.

=== Satirical song ===
- Limounier, du marriage (RS 29): Falck and Spanke note different melodies in TrouvM and TrouvT, but the melodies in the two sources are the same, albeit incomplete in the former, where the page is damaged through cutting.

=== Jeu parti ===
- Amis Guillaume, ainc si sage ne vi (RS1085): two melodies, one only in TrouvA, the other in TrouvM and TrouvT; both through-composed. NB: Although Falck ascribes this to Pierre, Tischler lists him only as a judge, attributing the song to Adam de Givenci and Guillaume le Vinier.
