= Corby Farm Complex =

- U.S. National Register of Historic Places
- Location within New York Location within the United States
- Nearest city: Honeoye Falls, New York
- Coordinates: 42°56′2″N 77°36′14″W
- Area: 38 acres (15 ha)
- Built: 1820
- Architectural style: Federal, Italianate
- MPS: Lima MRA
- NRHP reference No.: 08000273
- Added to NRHP: April 01, 2008

Corby Farm Complex is a historic farm complex located near Honeoye Falls in Livingston County, New York. The complex consists of the farmhouse and the following contributing structures: garage, smokehouse, pump house, clothes drying pole, privy, barn, two silos, and gate posts. The farmhouse consists of a 2 1/2-story main block with 1 1/2-story kitchen wing, built in the mid-19th century and remodeled in 1877 and again about 1900.

It was listed on the National Register of Historic Places in 2008.
