= Francesco Veau =

Italian painter

Francesco Veau (1727–1768) was an Italian painter of the Baroque period. He was a painter of quadratura and was born at Pavia.
