= Descort =

Form and genre of Old Occitan lyric poetry

The descort (Old Occitan: [desˈkɔɾt]) was a form and genre of Old Occitan lyric poetry used by troubadours. It was heavily discordant in verse form and/or feeling and often used to express disagreement. It was possibly invented by Garin d'Apchier when he wrote Quan foill'e flors reverdezis (only the first two lines survive); the invention is credited to him by a vida, and these are unreliable. Gautier de Dargies imported the descort into Old French and wrote and composed three.

Unlike the canso, the most common open poetic form of the troubadours and the template upon which most genres were built, the descort is made of stanzas with a variable number of lines, and of lines with a variable number of syllables. Whereas the different stanzas of a canso usually share at least some of the rhymes, the rhymes of a descort are usually used within a single stanza and then discarded. Raimbaut de Vaqueiras brings this to the extreme by actually using different languages in each stanza. This made the descort a more challenging piece to write, as its irregular nature forced the troubadour to always write a new melody.

== List of descorts ==
30 descorts survive

Troubadour	Incipit	Notes
Albertet de Sestaro	Bel m'es oimais	
Aimeric de Belenoi	S'a midons plazia	
Aimeric de Peguillan	Qui la vi, en ditz	Sometimes classed as a canso
Cerveri de Girona	Pus amors vol que faça sa comanda	
Cerveri de Girona	Estrayreˑm volia / De mi dons amar	
Cerveri de Girona	De Pala a Torosela	Called a recepta dexarob in the rubric
Elias de Barjols	Una valenta	
Elias de Barjols	Si.l bela.m tengues per seu	
Elias Cairel	Quan la freidors / irais / l'aura doussana	
Garin d'Apchier	Quan foill'e flors reverdis	Only the incipit is known, perhaps a canso
Guillem Augier Novella	Quan vei lo dous temps venir	
Guillem Augier Novella	Ses alegratge	
Guillem Augier Novella	Erransa	
Guillem de la Tor	En vos ai meza	
Guiraut de Calanso	Bel semblan	
Guiraut de Calanso	Ab la verdura	
Guiraut Riquier	Pos aman	
Giraut de Salaignac	Per solatz e per deport / Me conort / E.m don alegransa	
Peire Raimon de Toloza	Ab so gai, plan e car	
Pons de Capdoill	Un gai descort tramet leis cui dezir	
Raimbaut de Vaqueiras	Eras quan vei verdejar	A multilingual poem
Raimbaut de Vaqueiras	Engles, un novel descort	
Anonymous	Bella domna cara	Also called an acort
Anonymous	Poi qe neve ni glazi	Sometimes classed as a canso
Anonymous	Pos la douza sasons gaja	
Anonymous	Lai un fis prez nais e floris e grana	
Anonymous	Joi e chanç e solaç / E amors certana	
Anonymous	En aquest son gai e leugier	
Anonymous	Sill qu'es caps e guitz	Sometimes classed as a canso
Anonymous	Tot aissi soi desconsellatz	Sometimes classed as a sirventes
Anonymous	Amors, / dousors, / mi assaja	
Anonymous	A chantar m'er un discort	
Anonymous	Com plus fin'amors mi destreng	
