= Kevin Corby (cricketer) =

English cricketer

Personal information
- Full name: Kevin Corby
- Born: 12 July 1959 (age 67); Newcastle upon Tyne, Northumberland, England
- Batting: Right-handed
- Role: Wicket-keeper

Domestic team information
- Years: Team
- 1977–1991: Northumberland

Career statistics
| Competition | List A |
|---|---|
| Matches | 4 |
| Runs scored | 10 |
| Batting average | 5.00 |
| 100s/50s | –/– |
| Top score | 7 |
| Balls bowled | – |
| Wickets | – |
| Bowling average | – |
| 5 wickets in innings | – |
| 10 wickets in match | – |
| Best bowling | – |
| Catches/stumpings | 6/– |
- Source: Cricinfo, 1 July 2011

Kevin Corby (born 12 July 1959) is a former English cricketer. Corby was a right-handed batsman who fielded as a wicket-keeper. He was born in Newcastle upon Tyne, Northumberland.

Corby made his debut for Northumberland in the 1977 Minor Counties Championship against the Lancashire Second XI. Corby played Minor counties cricket for Northumberland from 1979 to 1991, which included 55 Minor Counties Championship appearances and 9 MCCA Knockout Trophy matches. He made his List A debut against Middlesex in the 1984 NatWest Trophy. He made 3 further List A appearances, the last coming against Surrey in the 1989 NatWest Trophy. In his 4 List A matches, he scored 10 runs at an average of 5.00, with a high score of 7. Behind the stumps he took 6 catches.
