= Chardon de Croisilles =

French trouvère (fl. 1220–1245)

Chardon de Croisilles or de Reims (fl. 1220–1245) was an Old French trouvère and possibly an Occitan troubadour. He was probably from Croisilles, but perhaps Reims. He is associated with the school of trouvères in and around Arras. Chardon wrote four chansons d'amour, two jeux partis, and one partimen.

In two of his chansons Chardon represented Marguerite de Bourbon, the wife (from 1232) of Theobald I of Navarre, in acrostics. Based on this and another internal reference to the castle of Monreal near Pamplona, where Theobald was staying in 1237, it is thought that Chardon joined Theobald's Crusade, which left for the Holy Land in 1237. Henry II of Bar, who adjudicated one of Chardon's jeux partis, also went on Crusade with Theobald.

All Chardon's French poems have the form ABABX: the chansons are decasyllabic, the jeux partis octosyllabic. His only surviving melodies, for Mar vit raison covoite trop haut and Rose ne lis ne me done talent, are through composed. A fifth chanson, no longer ascribed to Chardon, Li departirs de la douce contree, is notable for the simplicity of its melody compared to the "floridity" of that of Rose ne lis.

A poet named Chardo (or Cardo) wrote a partimen (the Occitan version of a jeu parti) with an otherwise unidentified poet named Uc. The rubric La tenzo del chardo e den ugo ("The tenso of [the] Chardo and of Lord Hugh") appears in the manuscript. While Chardo's portion of the exchange, N'Ugo, cauzetz, avans que respondatz, survives, Uc's part does not. Oskar Schultz-Gora (1884) first proposed to identify the troubadour with the trouvère, an identification accepted by Hermann Suchier in his edition (1907), followed by G. Huet (1908), Adolphe Guesnon (1909) and István Frank (1966). The identification was disputed by Vincenzo De Bartholomaeis (1906) and John H. Marshall. Suchier dated the partimen to c. 1240.
