= Richard de Fournival =

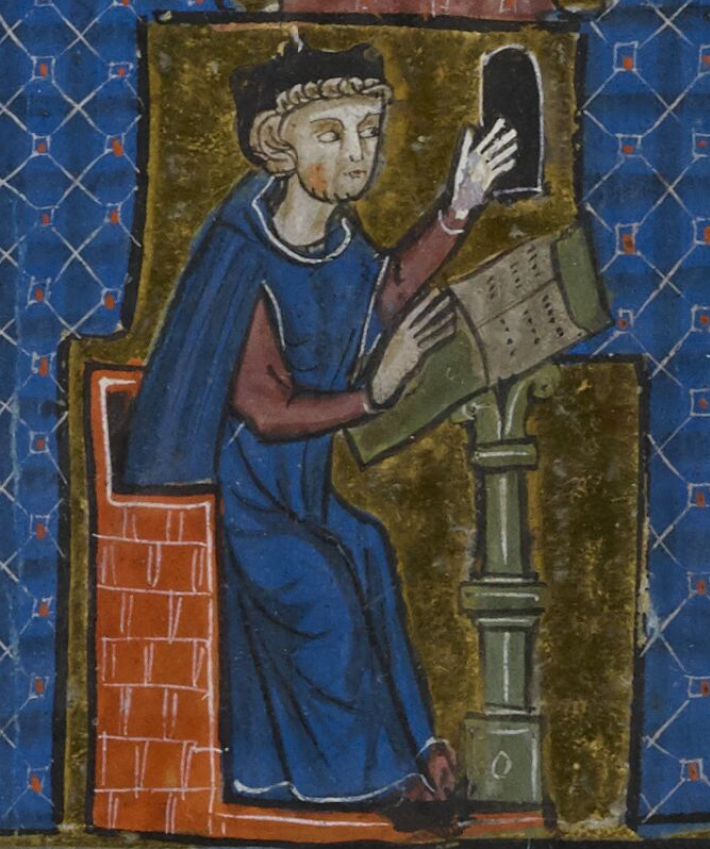
Richard depicted in the Chansonnier d'Arras

Richard de Fournival or Richart de Fornival (1201 – ?1260) was a medieval philosopher and trouvère perhaps best known for the Bestiaire d'amour ("The Bestiary of Love").

== Life ==
Richard de Fournival was born in Amiens on October 10, 1201. He was the son of Roger de Fournival (a personal physician to King Philip Augustus) and Élisabeth de la Pierre. He was also half-brother of Arnoul, bishop of Amiens (1236–46). Richard was successively canon, deacon, and chancellor of the cathedral chapter of Notre Dame d'Amiens. He was also a licensed surgeon, by the authority of Pope Gregory IX and this privilege was confirmed a second time in 1246 by Pope Innocent IV. He died on March 1, either 1260 or 1259.

Richard's library (of which the Biblionomia must be in part a catalogue) passed to Gérard d'Abbeville, an archdeacon at Amiens, who then left many of them to the recently established Collège de Sorbonne. Some of these volumes then passed to the Royal Library (now the Bibliothèque nationale de France) in the 18th century.

== Writings ==
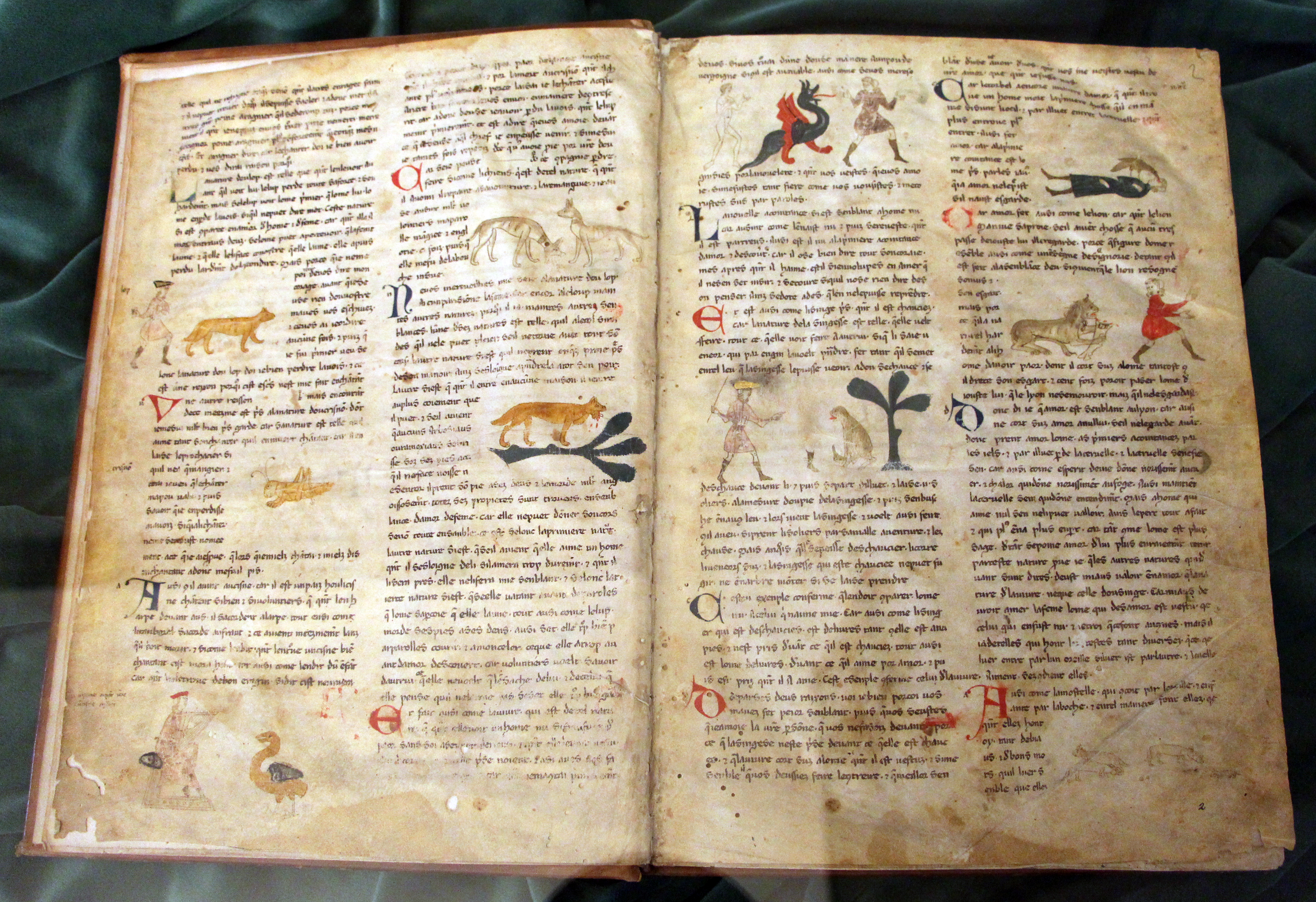
Bestiaire d'amour, XIV sec. (Biblioteca Medicea Laurenziana)

Richard also wrote several other works besides the prose Bestiaire d'amour: the Commens d'amours, Censes d’amore, Poissance d’amore, De vetula and Amistié de vraie amour. In addition, he composed a list of his own books entitled the Biblionomia, the Nativitas (an astrological autobiography), and the De arte alchemica.

=== The Biblionomia ===
The Biblionomia is a list of 162 volumes (some containing more than one work), divided into grammar, dialectic, rhetoric, geometry and arithmetic, music and astronomy, philosophy, and poetry. Whether this was an ideal library or a real one is uncertain. But we can say, however, that at least 35 volumes have been identified as items in medieval libraries (e.g., the Sorbonne) and still existing in various modern libraries (e.g., the Bibliothèque nationale de France), so it cannot be entirely made up.

The list (and its latest possible date of 1260) does allow us to date certain medieval writings. For instance, the inclusion of various works by Jordanus de Nemore – his Liber philotegni (Fournival no. 43), the De ratione ponderis (no. 43), an Algorismus (no. 45), his Arithmetic (no. 47), the De numeris datis (no. 48) and the De plana spera (no. 59) – is our only information on when Jordanus must have lived, i.e., before 1260.
