= Gautier d'Espinal =

French poet-composer

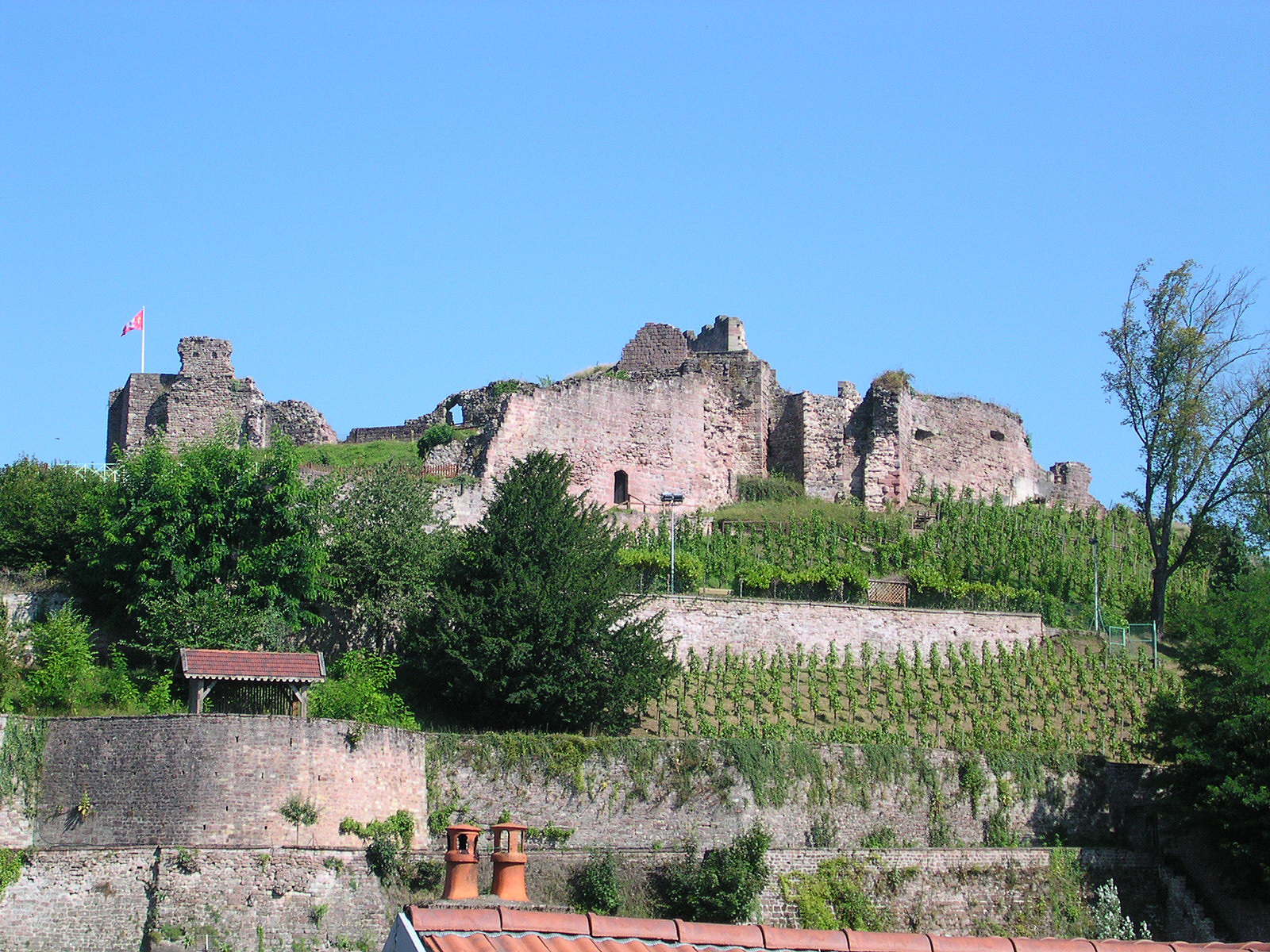
The Château d'Épinal, first constructed in the 13th century

Gautier d'Espinal (also d'Epinal, d’Épinal or d'Espinau) (active before 1231). Grove states that while details of his life are lacking, some documents of the time mention a Gautier d'Espinal active between 1232 and 1272, but it is uncertain if this is the trouvère. As some of Gautier's songs are contained in the oldest part of Trouvère MS U, they must have been composed before 1231–32. Grove assumes Gautier was one of the seigneurs of the city of Epinal.

H. Petersen Dyggve noted that Tout autresi com l'äimans deçoit (RS1840) was addressed to 'mon seignor Huon'. Dyggve believed this to be a reference to one of the counts of Vaudémont, likely either Hugues II, Count of Vaudémont (reigned 1190–1235/36), or his successor, Hugues III (reigned until 1246). In addition, his use of lapidiary material that conflates the magnet and the diamond to refer to a lady both obdurate and attracting the lover, links him more readily to troubadours such as Bernart de Ventadorn, Folquet de Marselha and Aimeric de Peguilhan, all of which used this specific image. Based on these associations, Gautier’s work is generally dated to the late 12th century through the first half of the 13th century.

== Works ==
His work appears to have been popular enough to become widely distributed, with some of his compositions appearing in over a dozen separate manuscripts and across all of the philological families of the trouvère sources. Grove lists fourteen songs with reliable attribution to Gautier, eleven of them with extant melodies. The list below relies instead on Spanke's revision of Raynaud's catalogue, and gives greater detail than Grove. The total listing below gives 21 songs, 13 with surviving melodies, which are attributed to Gautier in at least one manuscript and do not have conflicting attributions. In addition there are four further songs, all with surviving melodies, which have conflicting attributions and of which three are probably by other trouvères.

=== Songs without conflicting attribution ===
- A droit se plaint et a droit se gamente (RS749), found in Trouvère MSS U and, with attribution, C; melody in U.
- Aïmans fins et verais (Se li mons) (RS199), found with attribution in Trouvère MSS M, K, N, P, and without in V, O R, S, B, U, C. The first strophe is copied in Girart d'Amiens's Méliacin; the work was contained in now-lost leaves of Trouvère MS X; melodies survive in most sources.
- Amours et bone volentés (RS954), found in Trouvère MSS U and, with attribution, C; melody in U.
- Amours, a cui tous jours serai (RS104), in Trouvère MS M; no melody survives (M has empty staves).
- Desconfortés et de joie parti (RS1073), found with attribution in Trouvère MSS M, T, K, and N, and C; anonymous in P, V, O, R, and U. The first strophe is copied in Girart d'Amiens's Méliacin; melodies survive in most sources.
- En toute gent ne truis tant de savoir (RS1816), attributed in Trouvère MS M, but anonymous in C, leading the modern editor to consider it doubtful. No melody survives (both sources have empty staves).
- Ja pour longue demouree (RS504), found in Trouvère MSS U and C (with attribution); no melody survives, since U has only space for staves that were never entered and C has empty staves.
- Jherusalem, grant damage me fais (RS191), crusade song ascribed in Trouvère MS M; feminine voice; no melody survives, since M has empty staves.
- Ne puet laissier fins cuers c'adès se plaigne (RS119), found in Trouvère MSS U and C (with attribution); melody survives in U.
- Outrecuidiers et ma fole pensee (RS542), found Trouvère MSS O and C and, with attribution, in M; melody survives in O (C and M have empty staves).
- Par son dous comandement (RS649), found in Trouvère MSS I and U and, with attribution, in C; melody in U.
- Partis de doulour (RS1971), attributed in Trouvère MS C; no melody survives (C has empty staves).
- Puis qu'en moi a recouvré seignourie (RS1208), found in Trouvère MSS O and, with attribution, C; the text of the opening stanza is also found at the end of Richard de Fournival's Bestiary of Love in Trouvère MS k; melody in O.
- Quant je voi l'erbe menue (RS2067), found in Trouvère MSS U and, with attribution, C; melody in U (C has empty staves).
- Quant je voi par la contree (RS501), ascribed in Trouvère MS M; no melody survives (M has empty staves).
- Quant voi fenir iver et la froidour (RS1988), ascribed in Trouvère MS M; no melody survives (M has empty staves).
- Quant voi iver et froidure aparoir (RS1784), ascribed Trouvère MSS K, N, P, and C; anonymous in MSS O and U; was copied in a now lost part of Trouvère MS X; melody found in all sources except C and U, which have empty staves.
- Se j'ai lonc tens amours servi (RS1082), found in Trouvère MSS I, U, and, with attribution, C; no melody survives (empty staves in C, text only in I and U).
- Se par force de merci (RS1059), found in Trouvère MSS O, I, U, and, with attribution, C; melody in O (C has empty staves, U has space for staves, I is text only).
- Tout autresi com l'äimans deçoit (RS1840), attributed in Trouvère MSS K, N, P, and C; anonymous in O and U; was copied in a now-lost part of Trouvère MS X; melody in all sources except C and O (which have empty staves).
- Tout esforciés avrai chanté souvent (RS728), found in Trouvère MSS O, U, C, and, with attribution, M; melody in O, U, and M; C has empty staves.

=== Songs with conflicting attributions ===
- Au comencier de ma nouvele amour (RS1960), attributed to Gautier in Trouvère MS N but to other authors in other sources (M, T, K, and R), as well as surviving anonymously in O and P; was copied in a now-lost part of Trouvère MS X; melodies in most sources. Probably not by Gautier.
- Bone amour qui m'agree (RS487), attributed to Gautier in Trouvère MS C, anonymous in Trouvère MS U, but attributions to Simon d'Authie in Trouvère MSS M, T, and a seem stronger. Probably not by Gautier.
- Commencement de douce saison bele (RS590=RS1328), found at the head of the Gautier section in Trouvère MS M (although initial, attribution, and first line are now cut away), but other sources are anonymous (P, V, O, L, H, U), or attribute it to the Chastelain de Couci (K, N, X); melodies survive in most sources. Possibly by Gautier.
- Puis qu'il m'estuet de ma doulour chanter (RS805), attributed to Gautier in Trouvère MSS N and X; attributions to Richard de Fournival in M, T, a, A, and R seem stronger; the song is anonymous in Trouvère MS O and when its first stanza is interpolated in Girart d'Amiens's Meliacin. Probably not by Gautier.

== Discography ==
Ensemble Syntagma has produced two discs dedicated to Gautier's songs:

- 2008 : Gautier d'Épinal. Remembrance, Ensemble Syntagma, Challenge Classics CC72190
- 2004 : Touz esforciez / Trouvères en Lorraine, Ensemble Syntagma, Pierre Vérany, PV704041

Various individual songs can be found on the following discs:

- Diabolus in Musica (Alpha 085)
- Millenarium (Ricercar RIC 215)
- Lucidarium (Empreinte Digitale, 1998)
