= Gautier de Coincy =

French abbot, trouvère, and musical arranger

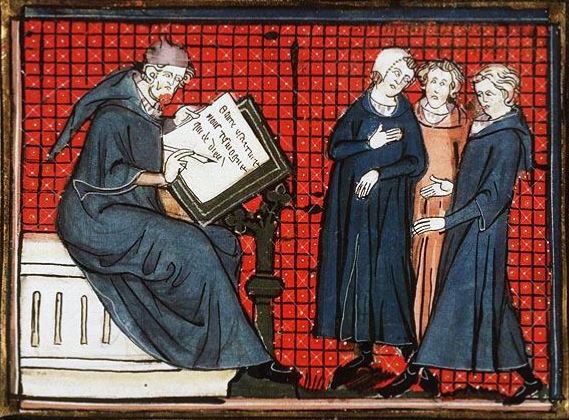
Coincy (left) in a 1327 illustration

Gautier de Coincy (1177–1236) was a French abbot, trouvère and musical arranger, chiefly known for his devotion to the Virgin Mary.

While he served as prior of Vic-sur-Aisne he compiled Les Miracles de Nostre-Dame (known in English as The Miracles of Notre Dame or The Miracles of Our Lady) in which he set poems in praise of the Virgin Mary to popular melodies and songs of his day. It is a reverential but humorous work, full of love for the cult of the Virgin Mary, which at that time also received attention from Saint Bernard of Clairvaux who was the leading medieval proponent of veneration of the Virgin as a counterbalance to the more rigorous Christian scholasticism, then the dominating spiritual force.

Unlike Clairvaux's more sombre tomes, de Coincy's book (whilst sharing much of the same ideological bedrock) tends more towards the indulgent or soft-hearted. Many of the songs de Coincy wrote were set to popular ballads then in vogue at the royal court, or borrowed the tune of pastoral or romantic ditties. The Miracles of Our Lady is one of the most popular works of Marianist literature from the period and it encapsulates a very particular set of Christian values, which saw in the Virgin Mary the most benevolent and humanistic aspect of salvation, intercession and mercy. Many of the songs are concerned with the key elements of the Virgin's earthly life - her conception, her birth, her childhood, her youth in the Temple, the events recorded in the Biblical gospels and her Dormition; the poems and stories are generally more concerned with her modern-day miracles.

On the subject of the Virgin's interaction with the contemporary faithful, one modern historian describes de Coincy's view of Mary thus: -

"The more raffish the Virgin's suppliant, the better she likes him. The miracles' heroes are liars, thieves, adulterers, and fornicators, footloose students, pregnant nuns, unruly and lazy clerics, and eloping monks. On the single condition that they sing her praises, usually by reciting the Ave Maria, and show due respect for the miracle of the Incarnation wrought in her, they can do no [fundamental] wrong. Her justice is loyalty to her own: whatever his conduct, anyone pledged to her protection is her liegeman and she his responsible suzerain. Through her the whole gay crew of wanton, loving, weak humanity finds its way to Paradise..."

In many ways, de Coincy rejected the strict Pauline morality that would come to characterise later denominations of Christianity, especially counter-Reformation Catholicism and Protestantism, which placed a great effort on self-denial and renunciation. In their immediate context, they were written to please de Coincy's own congregation and to present a softer form of Christianity in reaction to the hardline stance of the nearby cathedral-chapter at Beauvais, which had staged various plays savagely satirising secular pursuits as inherently wrong and damaging to one's spiritual life. This perhaps explain why de Coincy chose to express his own more liberal, Marianist views through the same exploitation of secular forms of presentation - in his case, poems and music.

Much of de Coincy's music is still performed and recorded, most recently by The Harp Consort.

== Recordings of Gautier de Coincy's Works ==
- The Harp Consort, Andrew Lawrence-King, director: Miracles of Notre-Dame (Harmonia Mundi U.S.A.)

== External Resources ==
- List of recordings of works by Gautier de Coincy (courtesy of the Early Music FAQ)
