= Pastourelle =

Poetic genre

The pastourelle (French: [pastuʁɛl]; also pastorelle, pastorella, or pastorita is a typically Old French lyric form concerning the romance of a shepherdess. In most of the early pastourelles, the poet knight meets a shepherdess who bests him in a battle of wit and who displays general coyness. The narrator usually has sexual relations, either consensual or rape, with the shepherdess, and there is a departure or escape. Later developments moved toward pastoral poetry by having a shepherd and sometimes a love quarrel. The form originated with the troubadour poets of the 12th century and particularly with the poet Marcabru (pastorela).

This troubadour form melded with goliard poetry and was practiced in France and Occitania until the Carmina Burana of c. 1230. In Spanish literature, the pastourelle influenced the serranilla, and fifteenth century pastourelles exist in French, German, English, and Welsh. One short Scots example is Robene and Makyne. Adam de la Halle's Jeu de Robin et Marion (the game of Robin and Maid Marion) is a dramatization of a pastourelle, and as late as Edmund Spenser the pastourelle is referred to in book six of Faerie Queene. Child's ballads gives an example in The Baffled Knight.

== Sources ==
- Paden, William D. "Pastourelle" in Alex Preminger and T. V. F. Brogan, eds., The New Princeton Encyclopedia of Poetry and Poetics. Princeton: Princeton UP, 1993. p. 888.
