= Chansonnier du Roi =

13th-century songbook

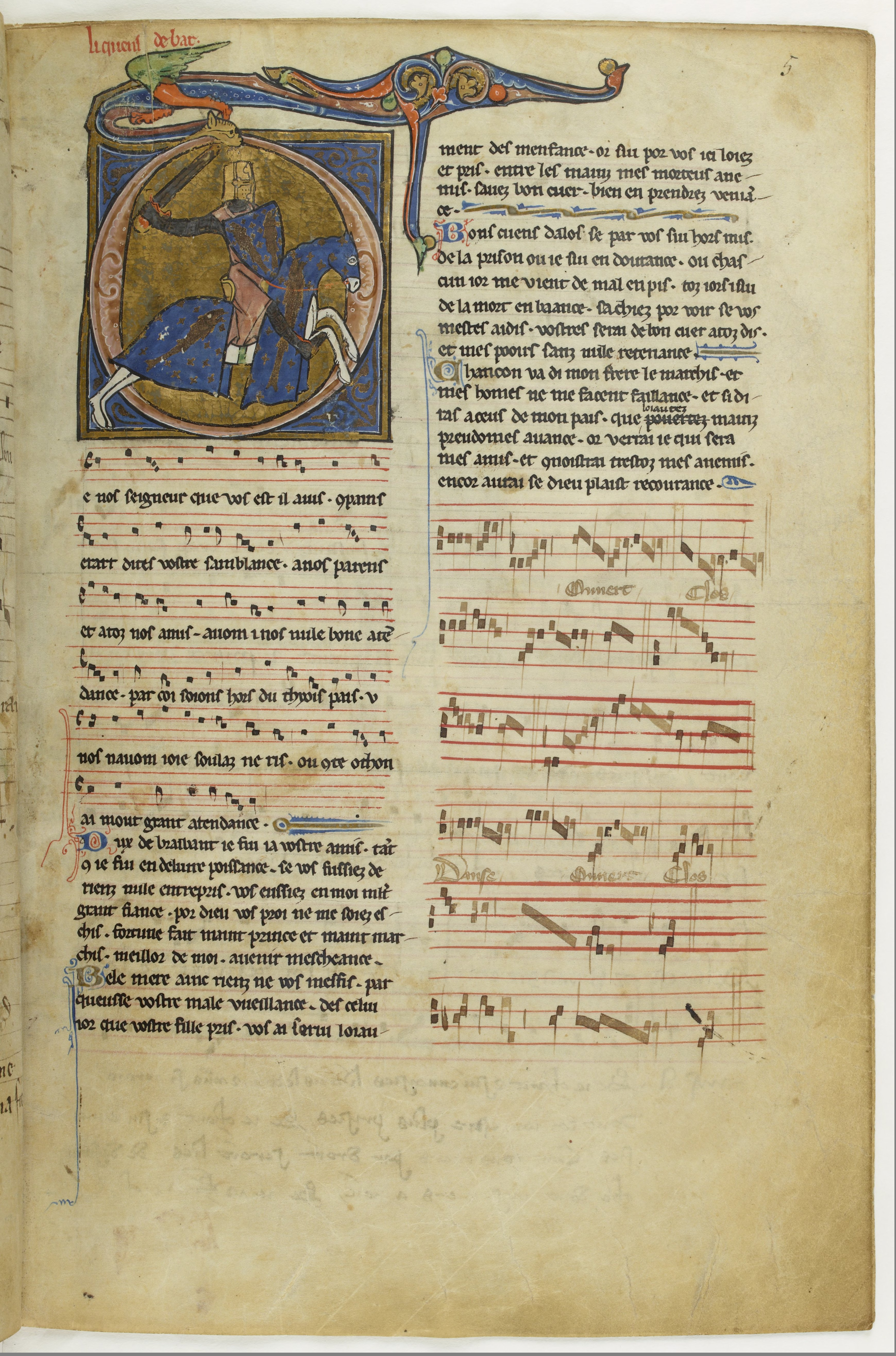
Page of a manuscript of the Chansonnier du Roi kept at the BnF

The Manuscrit du Roi or Chansonnier du Roi ("King's Manuscript" or "King's Songbook" in English) is a prominent songbook compiled towards the middle of the thirteenth century, probably between 1255 and 1260 and a major testimony of European medieval music. It is currently French manuscript no.844 of the Bibliothèque nationale de France. It is known by various sigla, depending on which of its contents are the focus of study: it is troubadour manuscript W, trouvère manuscript M, and motet manuscript R. It was first published by French musicologist Pierre Aubry in 1907 (Estampies et danses royales: Les plus anciens textes de musique instrumentale au Moyen Âge).

== Background ==
The manuscript contains more than 600 songs composed for the most part between the late twelfth and early thirteenth century. Some were written by famous trouvères, such as Theobald I of Navarre, Gace Brulé, Guiot de Dijon or Richard de Fournival, but others are anonymous. It contains as an addendum a booklet of songs by King Theobald I of Navarre, sometimes known as manuscript Mt. Around 85% of its material is French, while only 61 songs are by troubadours, in a Frenchified form of Occitan. Of these, 51 have music.

The songbook has close associations with the Principality of the Morea and was most likely created as a gift for William of Villehardouin, Prince of Achaea by Charles of Anjou, the King of Naples and William's father-in-law. By around 1270, it was in Charles' possession. Today, the state of conservation of the collection is bad. Eighteen pages are missing and several decorative initials have been cut out, but it remains a major testimony of medieval music.

== Recordings ==
- The Manuscrit du Roi was recorded in 1992 by the Ensemble Perceval, and was published in 1993 by Arion.
- Estampies & Danses Royales by Hespèrion XXI and Jordi Savall (2008)
- Various songs and instrumental pieces from the Manuscrit du Roi feature on the CD Music for a Medieval Prince (2012) recorded by Trouvere Medieval Minstrels.

== Sources ==
- Aubrey, Elizabeth (1996). The Music of the Troubadours. Bloomington. ISBN 9780253332073.
- Aubrey, Elizabeth. "Sources, MS, §III: Secular monophony, 4. French". Grove Music Online. Oxford Music Online. Oxford University Press. Originally in Stanley Sadie, ed., The New Grove Dictionary of Music and Musicians (London 1980), vol. 23, p. 853.
- Haines, John (1998). The Musicography of the Manuscrit du Roi. Toronto.
- Haines, John (1998–2002). "The Transformations of the Manuscrit du Roi". Musica Disciplina. 52: 5–43.
- Haines, John (2013). "The Songbook for William of Villehardouin, Prince of the Morea (Paris, Bibliothèque nationale de France, fonds français 844): A Crucial Case in the History of Vernacular Song Collections". In Sharon Gerstel (ed.). Viewing the Morea: Land and People in the Late Medieval Peloponnese. Cambridge, MA. pp. 57–109.
- Page, Gill (2015). "Literature in Frankish Greece". In Nickiphoros I. Tsougarakis; Peter Lock (eds.). A Companion to Latin Greece. Leiden. pp. 288–325.
- Spanke, Hans (1943). "Der Chansonnier du Roi". Romanische Forschungen. 57: 38–104.
