= Gace Brulé =

12th/13th-century French nobleman and trouvère

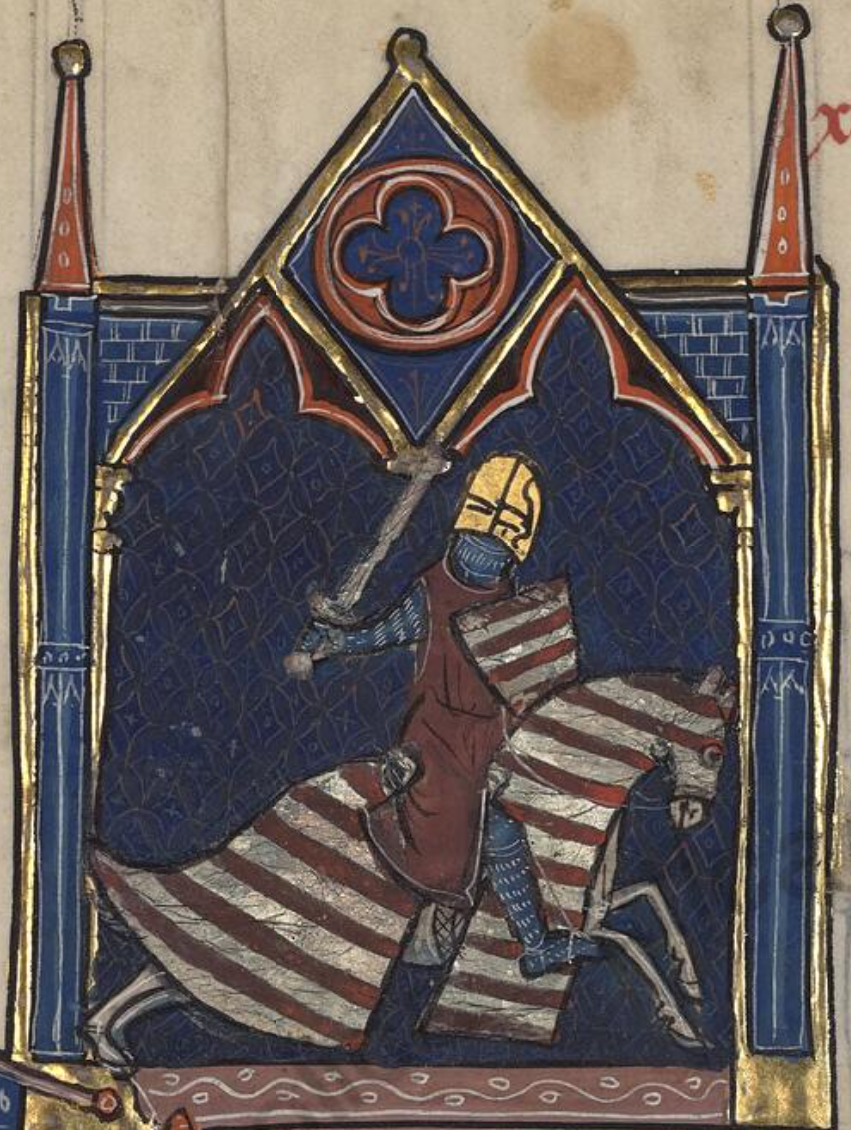
Gace depicted in the chansonnier Reg.lat.1490

Gace Brulé (c. 1160 – after 1213) was a French nobleman and trouvère from Champagne.

His name is simply a description of his blazonry. He owned land in Groslière and had dealings with the Knights Templar, and received a gift from the future Louis VIII. These facts are known from documents from the time. The rest of his history has been extracted from his poetry.

It has generally been asserted that he taught Theobald IV of Champagne the art of verse, an assumption which is based on a statement in the Chroniques de Saint-Denis: "Si l'est entre lui [Theobald] et Gace Brulé les plus belles chançons et les plus delitables et melodieuses qui onque fussent ales." This has been taken as evidence of collaboration between the two poets.

The passage will bear the interpretation that with those of Gace the songs of Thibaut were the best hitherto known. Paulin Paris, in the Histoire littéraire de la France (vol. xxiii.), quotes a number of facts that fix an earlier date for Gace's songs. Some scholars believe that Gace is the author of the earliest known jeu parti, although the early twentieth-century editor of the jeux partis, Arthur Langfors, considered this to be a misattribution, based on discrepancies between manuscripts. The interlocutors are Gace and a count of Brittany who is identified with Geoffrey of Brittany, son of Henry II of England.

Gace appears to have been banished from Champagne and to have found refuge in Brittany. A deed dated 1212 attests a contract between Gatho Bruslé (Gace Ernie) and the Templars for a piece of land in Dreux. It seems most probable that Gace died before 1220, at the latest in 1225.

See Gédéon Busken Huet, Chansons de Gace Brulé, edited for the Société des anciens textes français (1902), with an exhaustive introduction. Dante quotes a song by Gace, Ire d'amor qui en mon over repaire, which he attributes erroneously to Thibaut of Champagne (De vulgari eloquentia, p. 151, ed. P Rajna, Florence, 1895).
