= Gaidifer d'Avion =

Gaidifer (Gadifer) d'Avion (fl. 1230–50) was an Artesian trouvère from Avion. He entered the Church and was associated with the poets of the so-called "School of Arras".

Gaidifer was well-connected to contemporary poets. He was a respondent to Jehan Bretel in two jeux partis judged by the trouvères Perrin d'Angicourt and Jehan le Cuvelier d'Arras and the banker Audefroi Louchart. Gaidifer was a judge of Jehan de Grieviler and Robert de Castel in two other jeux partis.

Besides his two jeux, Gaidifer wrote seven chanson courtoises, six of which appear only in the Rome Chansonnier. His style is described as "sharply circumscribed": all his poems are isometric and octo- or decasyllabic. All his simple melodies are in bar form, but spanning wide ranges (often an octave or higher). In Tant ai d'amours, which served as a model for Lambert Ferri (J'ai tant d'amours apris et entendu) and Adam de la Bassée (Ave rosa rubens et tenera), there is repetition in the cauda. One piece, Tout me samble, does not survive with its music.

== List of pieces ==
- Gaidifer, par courtoisie, with Bretel
- Gaidifer, d'un jeu parti, with Bretel
- Amours qui sur tous a pooir
- Je me cuidoie bien tenir
- Las pour quoi ris ne jus me chant
- Par grant esfort m'estuet dire et chanter
- Quant Dieus ne veut, tout si saint n'ont pooir
- Tant ai d'amours apris et entendu
- Tout me samble noient quant ne vous voi

== Bibliography ==
- Karp, Theodore C. "Gaidifer d'Avion." Grove Music Online. Oxford Music Online. Accessed 20 September 2008.
