= Chansonnier d'Arras =

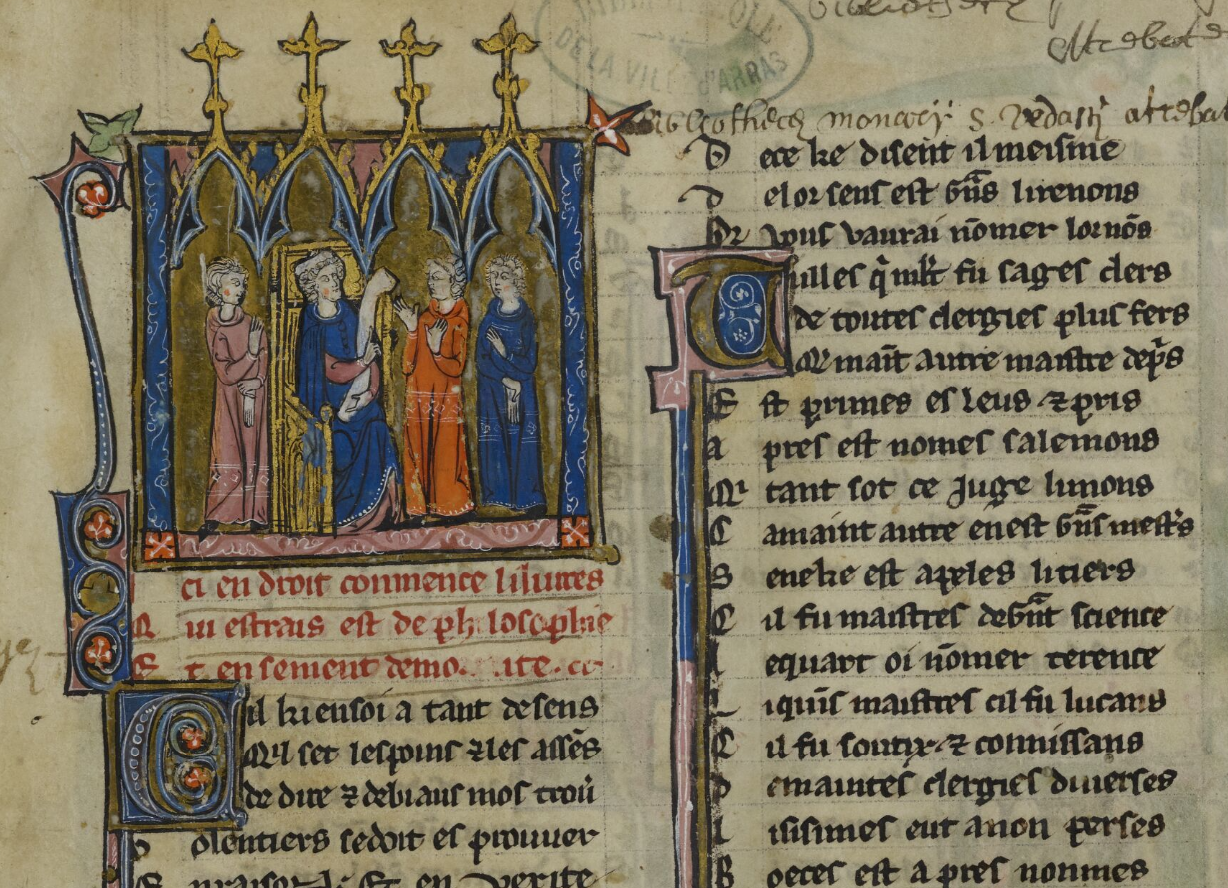
First page

The Chansonnier d'Arras is an illuminated manuscript of the late 13th century containing a variety of religious and philosophical texts and songs in 220 folios. It is written in the Picard dialect of Old French. It is now manuscript 657 (formerly 139) in the municipal library of Arras. In trouvère studies, it is known by the conventional siglum A.

== Production and provenance ==
Two scribal hands are responsible for the text and one for the musical notation, which was added last. A scribe named Jehans d'Amiens li petis signed and dated the last work in August 1278. It is possible that the chansonnier section was only added in the early 14th century. The manuscript is a product of Artois, possibly Amiens. It belonged to the Abbey of Saint-Vaast by about 1625, but was seized by the government during the French Revolution in 1790. A facsimile of the manuscript was published in 1926 by Alfred Jeanroy, who detected that some pages were out of order. The manuscript was rebound by the Bibliothèque nationale de France in 1955.

== Contents ==
Although the entire manuscript is commonly called a chansonnier, only the middle section truly fits that description. The manuscript can be divided into three sections. The first 128 folios are devoted to religious, philosophical and ethical texts. A rubric on the first folio identifies the works which follow as philosophy and morality. These include the poem Le Livre de philosophie et de moralité. On folio 32, an explicit announces the end of the first part. It is followed by some Marian texts (including a paraphrase of the Ave Maria), a series of saint's legends and Richart de Fournival's Bestiaire d'Amour. There are some lacunae in this section.

The second section, consisting of 32 folios, contains 42 chansons of courtly love and 31 jeux partis (debate songs). All have musical notation. Five trouvères with works in this section are drawn in miniature. These are the Chastelain de Couci, Gautier de Dargies, Ugon de Bregi, Richart de Fournival and Adam de la Halle. In addition to these, four other trouvères are named but not illustrated: the Vidame de Chartres, Pierres de Molaine, Duke Henry III of Brabant and Guillaume li Vinier. Many of the songs and all of the jeux partis are anonymous in the Chansonnier d'Arras, but the authorship of most is known from other sources.

The final section of 52 folios contains two romances, the Roman des sept sages and the Roman de Marques de Rome.

== List of trouvères ==
The following trouvères have work in the Chansonnier d'Arras:

- Adam de Givenchi
- Adam de la Halle
- the Chastelain de Couci
- Gautier de Dargies
- Gilles le Vinier
- Guillaume li Vinier
- Henry III of Brabant
- Jehan Bretel
- Jehan le Cuvelier
- Jehan de Grieviler
- Jehan Simon
- Lambert Ferri
- Maroie
- Margot
- Pierres de Molaine
- Pierot de Neele
- Philippot Verdière
- Richard de Fournival
- Robert de la Piere
- Simon d'Autie
- Theobald I of Navarre
- Ugon de Bregi
- the Vidame de Chartres

== Bibliography ==
- Aubrey, Elizabeth (2001). "Sources, MS: III. Secular monophony, 4. French". Grove Music Online (8th ed.). Oxford University Press. doi:10.1093/gmo/9781561592630.article.50158. ISBN 978-1-56159-263-0. (subscription, Wikilibrary access, or UK public library membership required)
- Huot, Sylvia (2019). From Song to Book: The Poetics of Writing in Old French Lyric and Lyrical Narrative Poetry. Cornell University Press.
- Lockert, Robin R. (1993). The Chansonnier d'Arras: A Critical Edition (PDF) (MA thesis). McMaster University.
