= Perrin d'Angicourt =

French composer

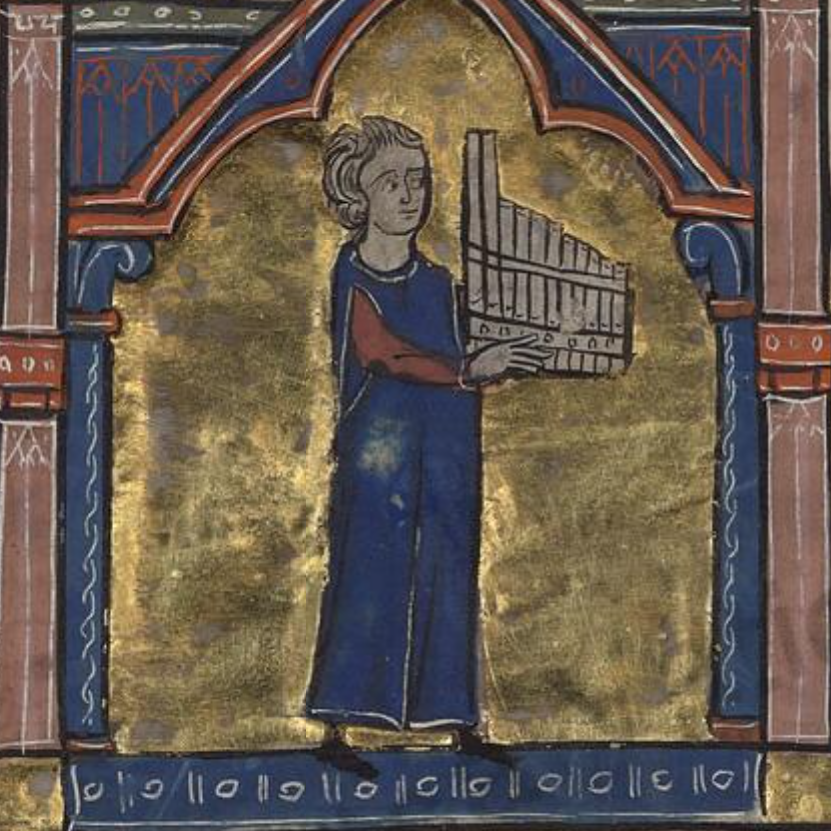
Perrin playing a portative organ in a miniature in a chansonnier

Perrin d'Angicourt (floruit 1245–70) was a trouvère associated with the group of poets active in and around Arras. His birthplace was most likely Achicourt, just south of Arras. His surviving oeuvre is large by the standards of the trouvères, and well-distributed in the chansonniers: thirty-five (35) of his songs survive, in some case in as many as eleven different manuscripts.

Two or perhaps three, of Perrin's songs ("J'ai un joli souvenir", "Quant partis sui" and perhaps "Quant li cincenis s'escrie") are described in their chansonniers as "crowned songs" (chansons couronnées), indicating that they had won poetry competitions, probably under the aegis of the puy d'Arras. Twice Perrin composed jeux partis ("Perrin d'Angicourt, respondés" and "Prince del pui") with Jehan Bretel, also from Arras, and he is referenced in other jeux partis by Bretel, Gaidifer d'Avion, Lambert Ferri, Jehan de Grieviler and a certain Audefroi (perhaps the banker Audefroi Louchart), and also a song by Gillebert de Berneville. Perrin dedicated his own songs "Quant voi en la fin" and "Lors quant je voi" to Duke Henry III of Brabant and Count Guy of Flanders, respectively, known patrons of the trouvères of Arras.

Perrin's most important patron, however, was Count Charles of Anjou, younger brother of King Louis IX of France and later himself King of Naples. Perrin dedicated "Quant li biaus estés repaire" to Charles, he and the count partnered to compose the jeu parti "Quens d'Anjou" and the two together judged "Encor sui cil qui a merci s'atent" by Jehan Erart. Charles also judged one of Perrin's jeux partis with Bretel, "Perrin d'Angicourt, respondés". Although the Charles and Perrin's literary relationship is known, evidence of their real-world interactions is scarce. One document of 1269 may refer to Perrin when it names Petrus de Angicuria as a "rector of the chapel" (rector capellae) to Charles in Naples.

Most of Perrin's poems are strophic, that is, they contain stanzas each with lines of different length. "Quant partis sui" has five line lengths per strophe. His preference was for heptasyllables. Twelve of his poems have fixed or varying refrains. Five or six were used as models for contrafacta. Two, possibly three, have their melodies preserved in mensural notation.

== Sources ==
- Theodore Karp. "Perrin d'Angicourt" Grove Music Online. Oxford Music Online. Oxford University Press, accessed 5 April 2013.
