= Audefroi le Bastart =

French composer

Audefroi le Bastart (modern French Bâtard) was a French trouvère from Artois, who flourished in the early thirteenth century.

Little is known about Audefroi's life beyond what can be inferred from his work. Two songs mention Jehan de Nesle, which Theodore Karp suggests dates them before 1200 when Jehan joined the Fourth Crusade. Song 5 (Com esbahis) is addressed in its envoy to the Lord of Harnes, a town almost midway between Arras and Lille. Given Audefroi's potential dates, this could be Michel de Harnes, the so-called 'knight-trouvère', who features in Guillaume de Dole by Jean Renart. Michel also joined the Fourth Crusade. The first stanza of another song (RS77) is interpolated into the Roman de la violette (c.1225) by Gerbert de Montreuil. Karp suggests he is a native of Picardy, near the Artois border. The registre of the puy d'Arras notes the death of Audefroi's wife.

Audefroi was the author of ten chansons d'amour, mainly found in the chansonnier du roi (Bibliothèque nationale de France, fr. 844 = TrouvM) and the chansonnier de Noailles (Bibliothèque nationale de France, fr. 12615 = TrouvT) and six narrative songs which modern scholars term chansons de toile or romances. A few of the chansons occur in other sources: RS223 is in TrouvO (F-Pn fr.846) and with empty staves in TrouvC (CH-BEb 389); RS1436 is in TrouvR (F-Pn fr. 1591). The songs appear in the same order in both TrouvM and TrouvT, although in a different order in the index of the former. TrouvT lacks the last three of the six romances/chansons de toile. Three of the romances are in TrouvC and two in TrouvU (F-Pn fr.20050).

== Works ==
RS numbers given according to the number standard catalogue. The order of the songs is that in the two main manuscripts and, for the chansons d'amours the edition by Cullman.

=== Chansons d'amours ===
- 1. Quant voi le tens verdir et blanchoier (RS1260)
- 2. Tant ai esté pensis ireement (RS688)
- 3. Bien doi faire mon chant öir (RS1436)
- 4. Pour travail ne pour paine (RS139)
- 5. Com esbahis (RS1534a=729)
- 6. Fine amour et esperance (RS223)
- 7. Amours, de cui j'esmuef mon chant (RS311)
- 8. Onques ne seu chanter (RS831)
- 9. Ne sai mès en quel guise (RS1628)
- 10. Destroys, pensis, en esmai (RS77)

=== So-called chansons de toile ===
- 11. Bele Ysabiaus, pucele bien aprise (RS1616)
- 12. Bele Idoine se siet desous la verde olive (RS1654)
- 13. En chambre a or se siet la bele Beatris (RS1525)
- 14. En nouvel tens Pascour que florist l'aubespine (RS1378)
- 15. En l'ombre d'un vergier (RS1320); this is a dialogue with a lamenting knight so is often omitted from collections of chansons de toile.
- 16. Bele Emmelos es prés desous l'arbroie (RS1688)

== Bibliography ==
Cullman, A. ed., Die Lieder und Romanzen des Audefroi le Bastard (Halle, 1914). Reprinted Geneva: Slatkine, 1974.

Mainini, Lorenzo, ed., Chansons de toile: Canzoni lirico-narrative in figura di donna (Rome, 2019).

Zink, M. 'Belle': essai sur les chansons de toile (Paris, 1978).
