= Jaques le Vinier =

Jaques le Vinier (fl. 1240–60) was a trouvère probably from the region around Arras and associated with the trouvères of that city. He was a member of the Puy d'Arras and wrote a jeu parti with Andrieu Contredit. His floruit dates are reconstructed on the basis of his reference to Jehan Bretel in his chanson d'amour De loial amour. Besides chansons d'amour, Jaques also wrote chansons dedicated to the Virgin Mary. The main source preserving his work is the Vatican Chansonnier. Jaques wrote original melodies for his Marian songs, while most such works by other trouvères were contrafacta of pre-existing music. The plagal melodies, all in bar form, are simple, but include both isometric or heterometric tunes. Jaques's complete œuvre comprises:

- Ains que mi chant aient definement
- Bele dame bien aprise
- Chanter veul de la meillour
- De loial amour jolie
- Fine Amours, cui j'ai mon cuer done
- Je sui cieus qui tous jours foloie
- Loiaus amours qui en moi maint
- Vierge pucele roiaus

It is doubtful whether this last one is Jaques's. Unlike his other Marian chansons, it is a contrafactum of Lo clar tems vei brunezir by Raimon Jordan.
