= Trésorier d'Aire =

Start of "Biau sire Tresorier d'Aire" in chansonnier a

The Trésorier d'Aire (Treasurer of Aire) was a 13th-century trouvère, sometimes identified with the Trésorier de Lille.

According to Jean-François Nieus and Aurélie Stuckens, the poet is Guillaume d'Haverskerque, a son of Bauduin, lord of Haverskerque, and the treasurer of the churches of both Aire and Lille. He married a daughter of the famous crusader Elinard, lord of Seninghem, but later entered the church. He is recorded as treasurer of the collegiate church of Saint-Pierre d'Aire between February 1252 and March 1257. He was the treasurer of the collegiate church of Saint-Pierre de Lille in 1270–1271 and then provost of Aire beginning in 1273 or 1274. He died between 1282 and 1285.

Only part of one song, a jeu parti, is attributed to the Trésorier d'Aire. In the song "Biau sire Tresorier d'Aire" (or "Biaus sire..."), found in chansonniers a and b, Jehan Bretel and Lambert Ferri team up to debate Jehan le Cuvelier and the Trésorier d'Aire.

He is the addressee in two envois of Thomas Herier.

== Bibliography ==
- Linker, Robert White (1979). A Bibliography of Old French Lyrics. Romance Monographs.
- Nieus, Jean-François; Stuckens, Aurélie (2020). "Vestiges épistolaires de Marguerite, comtesse de Flandre et de Hainaut: Deux collections-formulaires du début des années 1270" (PDF). Archiv für Diplomatik, Schriftgeschichte, Siegel- und Wappenkunde. 66: 150–238.
- O'Sullivan, Daniel E. (2019). "The Northern Jeu-parti". In Jennifer Saltzstein (ed.). Musical Culture in the World of Adam de la Halle. Brill. pp. 153–188.
- Petersen Dyggve, Holger (1943). "Personnages historiques figurant dans la poésie lyrique française des siècles XII^{e} et XIII^{e}: Thomas Herier et ses protecteurs". Neuphilologische Mitteilungen. 44 (3): 55–97. JSTOR 43341329.
- Petit, Aimé (2021). "Trouvères lillois". Nord'. 78 (2): 91–107. doi:10.3917/nord.078.0091.
