= Dame Margot (trouvère) =

13th-century trouvère

The song "Je vous pri, dame Maroie" in the Chansonnier d'Arras

Dame Margot (fl. 13th century) was a trouvère from Arras, in Picardy, France. One extant work of hers is jeu parti, a debate song, in which she debates Dame Maroie. This song, "Je vous pri, dame Maroie," survives in two manuscripts, which each give separate and unrelated melodies. In another jeu parti she is a judge, opposing Jehan le Cuvelier d'Arras and Jehan Bretel. She is listed as a member of the Puy d'Arras.

== Sources ==
- Berger, Roger (1981). Littérature et société arrageoises au XIIIe siècle: Les chansons et dits artésiens. Arras: Commission Départementale des Monuments Historiques du Pas-de-Calais.
- Maria V. Coldwell. "Margot, Dame, and Maroie, Dame", Grove Music Online, ed. L. Macy (accessed October 21, 2006), grovemusic.com (subscription access).
- Doss-Quinby, Eglal; Joan Tasker Grimbert; Wendy Pfeffer; Elizabeth Aubrey (2001). Songs of the Women Trouvères. New Haven: Yale UP. ISBN 0-300-08413-7.
