= Thomas Herier =

Thomas Herier, Erier, Erriers, or Erars (fl. 1240–1270) was a Picard trouvère associated with the "Arras school".

Herier is not mentioned in contemporary documents and all that is known about him is derived from his works. He composed a jeu parti with Gillebert de Berneville and possibly another with Guillaume le Vinier. He addressed one poem to "Jakemon of Cyson" (Jacques de Cysoing) and another to a Trésorier, probably either the Trésorier de Lille or the Trésorier d'Aire. His relation to Arras is established by his references to a local banker, Audefroi Louchart, and the local sheriff, Mikiel le Waisdier. He also mentions in his poems Jeanne, Countess of Ponthieu, and the Sire du Roeulx (Rués).

According to Theodore Karp, "Herier's poetry displays a certain elegance, but is commonplace in thought and imagery." His poems are heptasyllabic with the exception of the decasyllabic Mais n'os chanter and generally isometric. All his melodies are in bar form save for the descort Un descort vaurai retraire. None of them survive in mensural notation. Karp considers Bien me sui aperceus and Ja ne lairai mon usage to be more ornate than the others.

He was responsible for numerous les grande chansons courtoise in the style of the vernacular lais, which often address the irony, in the protagonist's view, of falling in love with a woman when this makes her one's "lord and master" in doing so.

== Extant works with melodies ==
- Ainc mais nul jour ne chantai
- Bien me sui aperceus
- Deus, com est a grant doulour
- Helas, je me sui donés
- Ja ne lairai mon usage
- Mais n'os chanter de fueille ne de flours
- Nus ne set les maus d'amours
- Onc ne sorent mon pensé
- Quant la froidure est partie
- Quant voi le tens repairier
- Tant ai amé et proié
- Un descort vaurai retraire
