= Robert de la Piere =

Trouvère

Robert de la Piere (died 1258) was a trouvère of the so-called "school" of Arras. In his time Robert's bourgeois family was prominent in Arras, though the earliest known member is only recorded in 1212. Robert served as a magistrate in 1255, as attested by one surviving document in the municipal archives. There is also a surviving notice of his death in the spring of 1258, at Arras.

His nine chansons and five jeux partis survive only in north French sources, and were probably not widely copied or performed. The only possible exception to this is Hé, Amours, je fui nouris, which is widely preserved, but at the same time has conflicting attribution: it is more commonly assigned to Gillebert de Berneville in the manuscripts. The song Joliement doi chanter ascribed to Robert is also more often found ascribed to Gillebert. Hé, Amours was the basis for two contrafacta: Aucun gent m'out blasmé and Mout sera cil bien mouris, in praise of Mary. All the other seven chansons undisputedly assigned to Robert have melodies in bar form with similar Aufegesangen, but their Abgesangen exhibit greater freedom.

== List of works ==
Chansons

- Cele que j’ain veut que je chant por li
- C’il qui m’ont repris
- Contre le dous tens de mai
- J’ai chante mout liement
- Je chantai de ma doulour
- Je ne cuidai mais chanter
- Par maintes foi ai chanté liement

Jeux partis

- Robert de la Piere, repondés moi with Jehan Bretel
- Chopart, uns clers que se veut marier with Coupart
- De ce, Robert de la Piere with Lambert Ferri
- Grieviler, un jugement with Jehan de Grieviler
- Mahieu de Gant, respondés with Mahieu de Gant
- Mahieu de Gant, respondés with Mahieu de Gant
