= Andrieu Contredit d'Arras =

13th-century French troubadour

Andrieu Contredit d'Arras (c. 1200 – 1248) was a trouvère from Arras and active in the Puy d'Arras. "Contredit" may not be, as it might appear, a nickname, since two other individuals with the name Contredit are attested in a manuscript associated with the Puy. It records his death at Arras in 1248 and the death of his wife in 1225. Contredit may therefore be a surname. Andrieu Contredit wrote mostly grand chants, but also a pastourelle, a lai, and a jeu-parti with Guillaume li Vinier.

Andrieu is probably the Andreas Contredit, miles ministerellus, crucesignatus who in 1239, according to French royal documents, joined the Crusade of Theobald I of Navarre as a knight and minstrel. His appearance in royal documents may indicate his service (probably as a minstrel) to Louis IX, and he addressed his song Au mois d'avril to a king, who is probably Louis.

His song Ja pour nul mal (no.17 in the list below) was addressed to the Puy. Evidence for authorship is found in Andrieu's poems themselves, since he named himself as author in fourteen. He addressed Bone, bele et avenans (no.16) to a "Marote", probably fellow trouvère Maroie de Diergnau de Lille. He praised the city of Arras in L'autrier quant je chevauchoie (no.22). Andrieu three times refers to himself as messire (in the envoys of nos. 4 and 12, and in the second strophe of no.18), a title which some have interpreted as denoting nobility, although Nelson notes it is often used by clerics and bourgeois. His blason once decorated the start of his author collection in chansonnier TrouvM, but the manuscript is damaged in this place and the image has been lost.

Andrieu's chansons show a moderate variation of form. They all begin with the same rhyme scheme (ABAB), all are in regular metre with 7-, 8-, or 10-syllable lines, and all use coblas unissonans. Most of the songs have at least one envoy, which in the vast majority of cases is sung to the entire cauda melody. Most of the envoys name Andrieu as the composer, with the exception of those transmitted only in TrouvR (nos. 15-17). Andrieu's music is relatively varied, for the chansons it is often pedes cum cauda or bar form, or a modified version thereof.

== List of works ==
(numbering from the Edition of Nelson and van der Werf)

=== Lai ===
- 1. De bele Yzabel ferai, a lai, which survives with blank staves on fols 75v-76v in TrouvT, outside the author-collection of Andrieu's works in this manuscript, and ascribed only to "Contredis"

=== Chansons ===
- 2. Dame, pour vous m'esjoïs boinement
- 3. Penser ne doit villonie, attributed to Guiot de Dijon and Jehan Erart in some manuscripts.
- 4. Au tens que je voi averdir
- 5. Quant voi partir foille et flour et rosee
- 6. Tres haute Amours me semont que je chant
- 7. Iriez, pensis chanterai
- 8. Pré ne vert bois, rose ne flour de lis
- 9. Amours m'a si del tout a son voloir
- 10. Mout m'est bel quant voi repairier
- 11. El mois d'avril quant ce vient em paskour
- 12. Ja pour nul mal ne peur nesun tourment
- 13. Je ne me doi d'Amours de riens loer
- 14. Vivre m'estuet en tristror, en pesance
- 15. Tout tens est mes cuers en joie
- 16. Bone, bele et avenans
- 17. Ja pour nul mal ne pour nulle pensee
- 18. Del guerredon ke j'atenc a avoir, survives without music and incipit
- 19. [De] bone amour ki le set maintenir, survives without music and incipit
- 20. J'ai bone amour mout loiaument servie, survives without music

=== Jeu-parti ===
- 21. Guillaume le Viniers, amis, his part of a jeu-parti, survives without music

=== Pastourelle ===
- 22. L'autrier quant je chevauchoie

=== Doubtful work ===
- 23. Quant voi venir le beau tans et la flour, only attributed to "mesires andreus li contredis" in TrouvC and either anonymous or attributed to the Chastelain de Couci in all other manuscripts.
