= Guillaume le Vinier =

French trouvère and poet (c. 1190–1245)

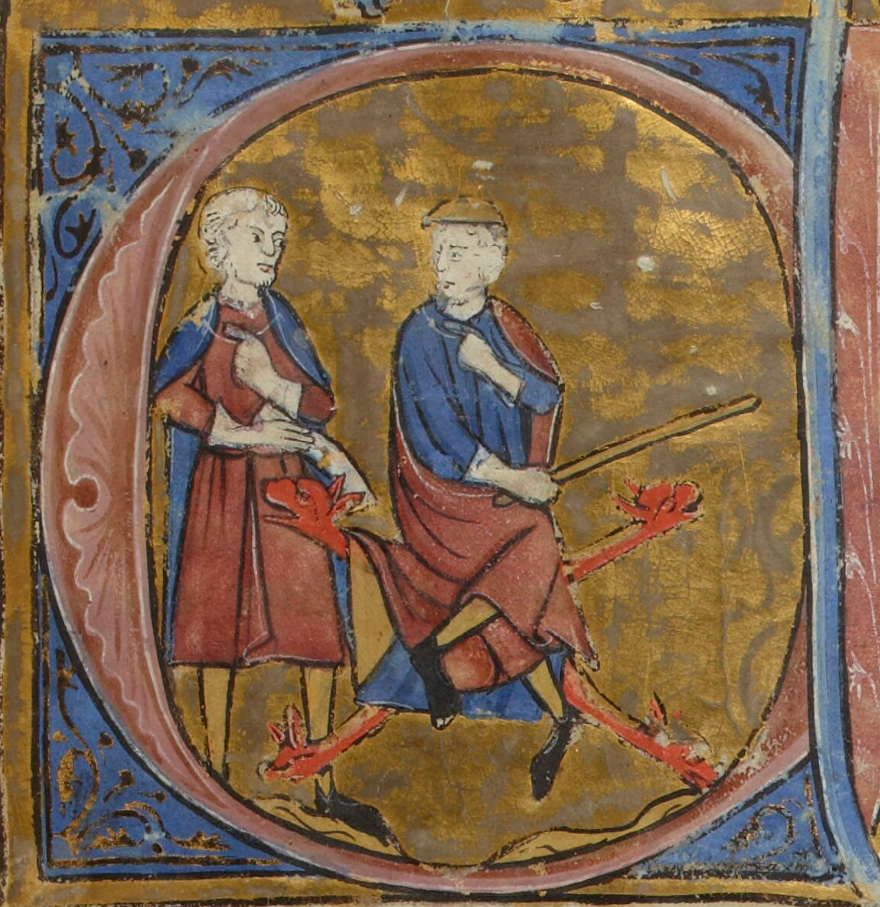
Guillaume le Vinier (seated) in the Chansonnier du Roi

Guillaume le Vinier (c. 1190–1245) was a cleric and trouvère, one of the most prolific composers in the genre. He has left compositions in all the major subgenres of trouvère poetry: chansons d'amour, jeux-partis, a lai, a descort, a chanson de mal mariée and a ballade. He wrote Marian songs and even an imaginary dialogue with a nightingale. His work can be dated with some precision: the poem "En tous tens" is quoted in the Roman de la violette, which was written around 1225.

Guillaume was born into a wealthy bourgeois family of Arras, the son of Philippe le Vinier and Alent. His younger brother, Gilles le Vinier, was also a trouvère. The two exchanged at least two jeux-partis: "Frere, ki fait mieus" and "Sire frere, fetes m'un jugemen". (The former may have served as a model for the anonymous song "A ce que je vuel comencier" (RS1272), although this assumption has been made purely on the basis of shared poetic form, since no contemporary melody survives for RS1272, which can be viewed, with a later piece of 'nonsense' notation here.) Guillaume is called 'magister' in a charter of 1245 and 'maistre' in manuscript copies of his songs, so was certainly a cleric. One of his songs (RS378) makes reference to the 'je' having been formerly at the Abbey of Saint-Vaast. Nonetheless, a charter of 1245 notes that he married a certain Hauydis, who remarried one Robert de Humbercourt on the death of Guillaume.

Guillaume was well-connected to the other trouvères active in and around Arras. He composed jeux-partis with Colart le Boutellier, Andrieu Contredit and Adam de Givenchi for certain, and may also have collaborated with Moniot d'Arras, Thomas Herier and the King of Navarre. Colart, Adam and Jehan Erart all dedicated works to him. He expressed a debt of gratitude to Gace Brulé's style in "Voloirs de faire" and quoted Gace's "N'est pas a soi" in one of his jeux-partis with Gilles. The unaccredited Marian song "Vierge pucele roiaus", which is modelled on the Old Occitan piece "Lo clar tems vei brunezir" by Raimon Jordan, may belong to Guillaume.

Most of Guillaume's music is in bar form, although "Chancon envoisie" is given partially in mensural notation in the Chansonnier Cangé. His melodies typically have a range greater than an octave. According to Karp, "modal interpretation of the melodies does not seem appropriate".

The date of Guillaume's death must be before Pentecost (4 June) in the year of 1245, since he is inscribed in the Necrology of the Confrérie des jongleurs et des bourgeois d'Arras for that year.

== List of songs ==
Solo works

- Amour grassi, si me lo de l'outrage (dedicated to Thomas de Castel)
- Amours, vostre sers et vostre hon
- Bien doit chanter la cui chancon set plaire (dedicated to Gilles le Vinier)
- Chancon envoisie
- Dame des cieus
- De bien amer croist sens et courtoisie
- Encor n'est raisons
- En mi mai, quant s'est la saisons partie
- En tous tens se doit fins cuers esjoir
- Espris d'ire et d'amour
- Flour ne glaise ne vois autaine
- Glorieuse virge pucele
- Ire d'amours et doutance
- Je me chevauchai pensis
- La flor d'iver sous la branche
- Le premier jour de mai
- Li rossignolés avrillous
- Mout a mon cuer esjoi
- Quant ces moissons sont faillies
- Quant glace et nois et froidure s'esloigne
- Qui que voie en amour faindre (dedicated to a "chastelain", perhaps Huon, chastellain d'Arras)
- Remembrance d'amour me fait chanter
- Se chans ne descors ne lais
- S'onques chanters m'eust aidie
- Tels fois chante li jouglere (dedicated to Jehan Bretel)
- Voloirs de faire chanson

Jeux-partis

- Amis Guillaume, ainc si sage ne vi
  - with Adam de Givenchi
- Frere, ki fait mieus a proisier
  - with Gilles le Vinier
- Guillaume le Viniers, amis
  - with Andrieu Contredit
- Guillaume, trop est perdus
  - with Colart le Boutellier
- Moines, ne vous anuit pas
  - possibly with Moniot d'Arras
- Sire frere, fetes m'un jugement
  - with Gilles le Vinier
- Sire, ne me celés mie
  - possibly with the King of Navarre
- Thomas, je vous vueil demander
  - possibly with Thomas Herier

== Bibliography ==
- Brun, Laurent, « Guillaume le Vinier », Les Archives de littérature du Moyen Âge (ARLIMA), [ www.arlima.net/eh/guillaume_le_vinier.html ].
- Constans, L., Chrestomathie de l'ancien français (IXe-XVe siècles), précédée d'un tableau sommaire de la littérature française au Moyen Âge et suivie d'un glossaire étymologique détaillé. Third Edition, Paris and Leipzig, Welter, 1906, [iii] + 244 pages.
- Fernandez, M.-H., « Le génie ondoyant et divers du trouvère Guillaume le Vinier », Marche Romane, Vol. xxx, nos. 3–4 (1980), p. 93–103.
- Gally, Michèle, Parler d'amour au puy d'Arras: rhétorique en jeu, Orléans, Paradigme (Medievalia, 46), 2003, 178 pages.
- Ménard, Philippe, « L'édition des textes lyriques du Moyen Âge: réflexions sur la tradition manuscrite de Guillaume le Vinier », in Actes du XIIIe congrès international de linguistique et philologie romane tenu à l'Université Laval (Québec, Canada) du 29 août au 5 septembre 1971, Québec, Presses de l'Université Laval, 1976, t. 2, p. 763-777.
- Les poésies de Guillaume le Vinier, Philippe Ménard, éd., Genève, Droz; Paris, Minard (Textes littéraires français, 166), 1970, [iv] + 285 pages. — éd.: 1983, [iv] + 296 pages. Reviewed by Jacques Ribard, Cahiers de civilisation médiévale, Vol. 14, numéro 55 (juillet-septembre 1971), p. 292-293 [ www.persee.fr/web/revues/home/prescript/article/ccmed_0007-9731_1971_num_14_55_1898_t1_0292_0000_1 ].
- Rivière, Jean-Claude, « Le vocabulaire dialectal dans les pastourelles des trouvères d'Arras », Mélanges de langue et littérature françaises du Moyen Âge et de la Renaissance offerts à Monsieur Charles Foulon, professeur de langue et littérature françaises du Moyen Âge et de la Renaissance, par ses collègues, ses élèves et ses amis. Vol. I, Rennes, Institut de français, Université de Haute-Bretagne, 1980, p. 301-312.
- Ulrix, Eugène, « Les chansons inédites de Guillaume le Vinier d'Arras. Texte critique avec les variantes de tous les manuscrits », in Mélanges de philologie romane et d'histoire littéraire offerts à M. Maurice Wilmotte, professeur à l'Université de Liège, à l'occasion de son anniversaire d'enseignement, Paris, Champion, 1910, vol. 2, p. 785-814.
