= Guillaume de Dole =

Novel by Jean Renart

- Author(s): Unknown
- Ascribed to: Jean Renart
- Language: Old French
- Date: early 13th century
- Manuscript(s): MS Regina 1725
- Genre: Chivalric romance
- Length: 5,656 lines

Guillaume de Dole (also known as (Le) Roman(s) de la Rose, or Guillaume de Dole) is an Old French narrative romance by Jean Renart. Composed in the early 13th century, the poem is 5,656 lines long and is especially notable for the large number of chansons it contains, and for its active female protagonist. The romance incorporates forty-six chansons (or parts thereof); it is the first extant example in French literature of a text that combines narrative and lyric. Its form was quickly imitated, by authors such as Gerbert de Montreuil, and by the end of the 13th century had become canonical.

The poem tells of the adventures of the title character and his sister Liénor. Guillaume is accepted at the court of Emperor Conrad who has fallen in love with Liénor despite his earlier aversion to love and marriage. Guillaume becomes one of the emperor's favorites and marriage negotiations proceed in a positive manner. The emperor's seneschal, however, discovers an intimate detail about Liénor's body and uses it to insinuate to the emperor and his court that she is no longer a virgin; the clever Liénor, with a ruse, proves his accusation false and marries the emperor.

== Manuscript, date, author ==
=== Manuscript ===
Guillaume de Dole is extant in a single manuscript in the Vatican Library, MS Regina 1725. Todd dates it in the 14th century, others in the late 13th century. The manuscript contains:

- Lancelot, the Knight of the Cart, by Chrétien de Troyes (first part missing), 1-34b;
- Yvain, the Knight of the Lion, also by Chrétien, 34c-68b;
- Guillaume de Dole, 68c-98c;
- Meraugis de Portlesguez, by Raoul de Houdenc, 98d-130d.

The manuscript's first known owner was 16th-century French historian Claude Fauchet; it was part of his extensive collection, and it is due to "Fauchet's zeal as a collector" that the manuscript and therefore the poem are preserved. During the French Wars of Religion, Fauchet fled Paris and his collection was dispersed. The next mention of the manuscript is as part of the library of Paul Pétau, and in 1650 it was acquired by Christina, Queen of Sweden. The Vatican library acquired the manuscript after 1689.

=== Date and title ===
The opening lines of the poem contain a dedication to Miles de Nanteuil, an early 13th-century churchman who was elected (but not confirmed) in 1201 as archbishop of Reims, and later became bishop of Beauvais, in northern France; he died circa 1235. According to Todd, the nobleman de Nanteuil may have been too young and wild to be elevated to the archbishopric, but this would have made him a good candidate for Renart's dedication. This, plus evidence based on other names found in the poem, led Todd to conclude that the poem was composed around the year 1200. Later critics and researchers, however, date the poem between 1204 and 1228, and tend toward the earlier date.

In the manuscript, the poem is called Romans de la Rose (l. 11), and hence Le Roman de la Rose, but it is often referred to as Roman de la Rose, or Guillaume de Dole in order to avoid confusion with Guillaume de Lorris and Jean de Meun's Roman de la Rose; Guillaume de Dole is a subtitle added by Fauchet.

=== Authorship ===
It wasn't until the late 19th century that scholars (including Paul Meyer) began entertaining the notion that Jean Renart, until then only known as the presumptive author of the Lai de l'Ombre, might also be responsible for either or both of the two contemporary romances L'Escoufle and Guillaume de Dole. F. M. Warren of Yale University, in a 1908 article, is one of the early proponents of identifying Renart as the author of all three, based on versification, phrasing, and vocabulary, and places the development of his poetic talent between 1195 and 1205. The next-to-last line of the poem contains an anagram on Renart's name: "...qu'il enTRA EN Religion."

== Content ==
=== Plot ===
The story begins at the court of Emperor Conrad, who for all of his good qualities has one defect: he refuses to get married, especially since, as he says, people no longer are as valiant and as noble as they used to be. His minstrel, Jouglet, tells him of Guillaume de Dole and his sister Liénor, and quickly the emperor falls in love with her, although he does not actually see her until the story's denouement. Guillaume is summoned to the court where he excels in chivalric exploits; the emperor tells him he wishes to marry his sister. Conrad's jealous seneschal interferes and visits Guillaume's family, where he gives his mother a valuable ring and gains her confidence; from her he learns that Liénor has a particular birthmark in the shape of a rose on her thigh. This knowledge is presented as proof that the seneschal has taken her virginity.

As a result of the accusation, both Guillaume and Conrad are distraught, to the point of misogyny. The clever Liénor, however, her reputation slandered, unmasks the seneschal with a ruse. She has a belt and other gifts sent to the seneschal, supposedly from the Chatelaine of Dijon, whom he had courted, with promises that the Chatelaine is ready to grant him his wishes. The messenger convinces the seneschal to wear the belt under his clothes. Liénor then goes to Conrad's court, where everyone is struck by her beauty, and pretends to be a maiden who was raped by the seneschal and has thus acquired intimate knowledge of his body and his clothing; she reveals he has a belt under his clothes. The belt is discovered under his clothes and a trial by ordeal is proposed. The seneschal's innocence is proven in an ordeal by water: he has never had sex with the maiden. When Liénor reveals that she is in fact Guillaume's sister, the seneschal's earlier claim of having deflowered her is proven a lie. The seneschal is shackled and incarcerated, and the wedding is celebrated with great pomp. On the wedding night, Conrad's happiness is greater than that of Tristan or Lanval; the next morning, "no one who asked [Conrad] for a costly gift was refused." As for the seneschal, Liénor implores Conrad to be merciful, and he is sent away as a Templar to join a crusade.

=== Themes ===
The plot of Guillaume revolves around the common theme of the gageure, a young man who, because of a wager (in the case of Guillaume, because of jealousy) needs to find a young woman's favor. He fails in his enterprise but pretends publicly to have succeeded, causing the ruin of a husband (if the gageure had claimed to have succeeded with another man's wife) or, in this case, the despair of a brother. Usually the young man's story is believed at first because he reveals an intimate detail about a young woman, who then has to prove her innocence.

Beginning with Michel Zink, whose influential 1979 monograph Roman rose et rose rouge: Le Roman de la rose ou de Guillaume de Dole ushered in a new era of criticism, critics have recognized Guillaume de Dole as a work of literature about literature, a self-referential poem that comments on the improbability of some of its own plot elements and on its own fictional status, encouraging a trend in studies of Renart and his work.

=== Songs ===
The romance contains some 46 chansons, which can be separated into two groups, according to Hollier and Bloch. The first group contains sixteen "aristocratic" chansons courtoises on the topic of courtly love, attributed to specific trouvères or troubadours (including Gace Brulé, Le Chastelain de Couci, Guillaume de Ferrières (the Vidame de Chartres), Jaufre Rudel, and Bernart de Ventadorn). A second group consists of thirty mostly anonymous songs of a more popular nature, such as three chansons de toile and three other ballads, two pastourelles, and twenty chansons à danser (dance songs). Incorporated also is a laisse of the chanson de geste Gerbert de Metz. Different scholars have slightly different counts; where Holier and Block count three ballads and three chanson de toiles, Maureen Barry McCann Boulton counts six chansons de toile; in her detailed investigation of the chansons she claims the poem contains forty-six chansons in eight different genres.

In its hybrid form, Guillaume de Dole is "the first extant example of the combined use of narrative and lyric in French." The mixed form proved to be popular and was soon found in other works, including Aucassin and Nicolette (early 13th century); Gautier de Coincy's Les Miracles de Nostre-Dame (c. 1218–1233); Gerbert de Montreuil's Le Roman de la Violette (c. 1230), which incorporates some forty songs; and Tibaut's Roman de la Poire (c. 1250), which incorporates a series of refrains. By the end of the century the form had become canonical.

=== Female protagonist ===
The female protagonist, Liénor, is notable because of her active nature: she herself unmasks the seneschal. She found a quick successor in the active female protagonist of Tibaut's Roman de la Poire. At least one recent publication states that Liénor might make a justifiable claim to being the romance's true hero.

== Editorial and critical history ==
The first mention of Guilllaume de Dole after the Middle Ages is found in the work of Claude Fauchet, who is generally considered to have studied the Vatican Regina manuscript (instead of another, now lost, manuscript). In 1844, Adelbert Keller published extracts of the poem including some of the chansons; the chansons acquired some fame, and in 1850 Darenberg and Renan traveled to Rome to study the manuscript, publishing a larger number of the chansons in 1855. It wasn't until 1870 that all of the chansons had been published. A lengthy analysis, partial edition, and summary in English was published by Henry Alfred Todd of Johns Hopkins University, in 1886. The poem was finally published in its entirety in 1893 by Gustave Servois for the Société des anciens textes français.

The first comprehensive study of the work of Jean Renart was published in 1935 by Rita Lejeune-Dehousse, who published an edition of the poem in 1935. Since then, it has been republished regularly. Translations have been published in modern French (1979), German (1982), and English (1993, 1995).

Between 2001 and 2007, Joshua Tyra adapted the text into a musical. An early version was read at the University of Chicago.

=== Modern editions and translations ===
- Andrieu, G.; J. Piolle; M. Plouzeau (1978). Le Roman de la rose, ou, de Guillaume de Dole de Jean Renart; Concordancier complet des formes graphiques occurentes, d'après l'édition de Félix Lecoy. Aix-en-Provence. ISBN 2-901013-04-X.
- Dufournet, Jean (2008). Le Roman de la rose ou de Guillaume de Dole. Honoré Champion.
- Lecoy, Félix (1971). Le Roman de la rose ou de Guillaume de Dole. Paris.
- Terry, Patricia; Nancy Vine (1993). The Romance of the Rose or Guillaume de Dole. U of Pennsylvania P. ISBN 0-8122-1388-2.
- Todd, Henry Alfred (1886). "Guillaume de Dole: an unpublished Old French romance". Transactions of the Modern Language Association of America. Modern Language Association: 107–57.

=== Critical studies ===
- Durling, Nancy Vine (1997). Jean Renart and the Art of Romance: Essays on Guillaume de Dole. UP of Florida. ISBN 0-8130-1495-6.
- Zink, Michel (1979). Roman rose et rose rouge: Le Roman de la rose ou de Guillaume de Dole, de Jean Renart. Paris: Nizet.
