= Robert de Castel =

Robert de Castel (d'Arras) (fl. 1272) was a trouvère active in and around Arras in the late thirteenth century. He is mentioned in the Congés of Baude Fastoul, written in 1272, which place him Arras at that date. He is the addressee of the poem Robert du Chastel, biaus sire, a jeu parti by another trouvère of Arras, Jehan Bretel (died 1272), which was judged by another Artesian, Gaidifer d'Avion.

Robert wrote six songs that have been preserved; two of these achieved some popularity. En loial amour ai mis is designated coronée (crowned) in one source, indicating that it won a poetic contest, probably to be associated with the Puy d'Arras. More popular was Se j'ai chanté sans guerredon avoir, which survives in eleven manuscripts: it is recorded in the Phrygian mode in the Chansonnier Cangé, is in the Dorian mode in the Chansonnier du Roi, and is coronée in the Chansonnier des Memses. The later anonymous religious piece La volontés dont mes cuers est ravis was a contrafactum of its melody. Besides these two songs Robert wrote Amours me mont me guerroie, Bien ait l'amours qui m'a doné l'usage, Nus fins amans ne se doit esmaier, and Pour (çou) ce se j'ain et je ne sui amés. This last was quoted—both lyrically and to a lesser degree musically—by Guillaume de Machaut in his four-part Middle French motet.
