= Trésorier de Lille =

Haute honor d'un commandement, text and music. The author is identified by the encircled red text in the right margin.

The Trésorier de Lille was a 13th-century trouvère from Lille. He is sometimes thought to be the same person as the Trésorier d'Aire.

== Identity ==
Trésorier is not a name but a title meaning "treasurer". Arthur Dinaux identified the Trésorier de Lille with the trouvère Pierre le Borgne. He was followed by Henri Pajot and tentatively by Robert Linker. Auguste Scheler rejected the identification.

Guillaume d'Haverskerque, a son of Bauduin, lord of Haverskerque, is the most likely candidate for the trouvère. Guillaume married a daughter of the famous crusader Elinard, lord of Seninghem, but later entered the church. He is recorded as treasurer of the collegiate church of Saint-Pierre d'Aire between February 1252 and March 1257. He was the treasurer of Saint-Pierre de Lille in 1270–1271 and then provost of Aire beginning in 1273 or 1274. He died between 1282 and 1285.

== Works ==
He left behind wo songs, both grand chants:

- Haute honor d'un commandement, preserved in chansonniers K, N, P and X
- Joie ne guerredons d'amours, preserved in chansonniers K, M, N, P, T and X, translated into French by Petit

== Bibliography ==
- Linker, Robert White (1979). A Bibliography of Old French Lyrics. Romance Monographs.
- Nieus, Jean-François; Stuckens, Aurélie (2020). "Vestiges épistolaires de Marguerite, comtesse de Flandre et de Hainaut: Deux collections-formulaires du début des années 1270" (PDF). Archiv für Diplomatik, Schriftgeschichte, Siegel- und Wappenkunde. 66: 150–238.
- Pajot, Henri (1864). Les poètes de Lille. Imprimerie de Horemans.
- Petit, Aimé (2021). "Trouvères lillois". Nord'. 78 (2): 91–107. doi:10.3917/nord.078.0091.
