= Margot and Maroie =

Margot and Maroie were two trouvères who wrote a jeu-parti together:

- Dame Margot (trouvère)
- Dame Maroie
