= Chanson de toile =

Genre of narrative Old French lyric poetry

The Chanson de toile (also called chanson d'histoire or romance) was a genre of narrative Old French lyric poetry devised by the trouvères which flourished in the late twelfth and early thirteenth century. As the term is a modern one, membership of the genre is subject to some disparity among scholars, but the most recent edition identifies twenty-one. Of these, five were written by Audefroi le Bastart; the others are anonymous. Of these eight are unica in the earliest chansonnier, TrouvU (Bibliothèque nationale de France, fr. 20050); one further one in TrouvU is also in the lai d'Aristote; six are in Guillaume de Dole by Jean Renart; and one is in the Roman de la violette by Gerbert de Montreuil.

Typically, they tell the story of a young, often married woman pining for a lover, with a happy ending. The genre's name derives from toile; that is, they are supposed to have been sung by women who were weaving, and the female main characters also sew as they relate their stories. In most cases, the song begins with a brief and sympathetic history of a woman: she is either absent from her lover or married unhappily to an older nobleman and in love with a knight. All but one end happily—the one exception is Bele Doette, who learns that her lover has died and then founds a monastery into which she retreats. The women sometimes appear careless, but their charm and demeanour are attractive. The chansons de toile are considered some of the most beautiful poems produced in Old French, and their importance was such that some of them were included in romances, in which they were sung by the heroines.

The Harvard Dictionary of Music suggests that since the woman's voice in the chanson de toile is so prominent some of them may have been composed by women. Musically some of them are quite ornate, considering the relatively simple narrative. While not all the melodies survive because of these songs' attestation within narratives into which notation was never entered, those by Audefroi le Bastart all have notation in TrouvM (F-Pn fr.844) and several are also notated in TrouvT (F-Pn fr.12615).

== Works ==
List based on count given in Mainini 2019.

=== Chansons de toile in Guillaume de Dole ===
- Fille et la mere se sieent a l’orfrois
- Siet soi bele Aye as piez sa male maistre
- La bele Doe siet au vent
- Bele Aiglentine en roial chamberine
- Renaus et s’amie chevauche par un pré
- Or vienent Pasques les beles en avril

=== Chanson de toile in the Roman de la violette ===
- Siet soi biele Eurïaus, seule est enclose

=== Chanson de toile in TrouvU and the Lai d’Aristote ===
- En un vergier lez une fontenele

=== Unique Chansons de toile in TrouvU ===
- Bele Yolanz en ses chambres seoit
- Oriolanz en haut solier
- Bele Doette as fenestres se siet
- Quant vient en mai, que l’on dit as lons jors
- Bele Yolanz en chambre koie
- An halte tour se siet belle Yzabel
- Lou samedi a soir fat la semainne
- Belle Amelot soule an chanbre feloit

=== Chansons de toile by Audefroi le Bastart ===
- Bele Ysabiauz, pucele bien aprise
- Bele Ydoine se siet desous la verde olive
- An chambre a or se siet la belle Beatris
- Au novel tans Pascour que florist l’aube espine
- Bele Emmelos es prés, desouz l’arbroie

== See also ==
- Weaving (mythology)
