= Gillebert de Berneville =

13th century French poet

Gillebert (Guillebert) de Berneville (fl. c. 1250–70) was a French trouvère. According to Theodore Karp, in its time, "his poetry was much appreciated", but it is "[n]either original nor profound," rather he was and is admired more for "facility, grace and mastery of form". Fresco lists 35 songs by Gillebert, of which five are unica (found in a single manuscript) and some are copied in up to seven sources.

Gillebert worked within the circle of poets at Arras, which is close to his home town of Berneville, and had contact with the most prominent men of the region. He composed jeux-partis with Henry III, Duke of Brabant, and Thomas Herier. He also entered into competitions under the judgement of Charles of Anjou, Raoul de Soissons, the Châtelain de Beaumetz, Hue d'Arras and perhaps Beatrice, sister of Henry III and widow of William II, Count of Flanders. Gillebert dedicated chansons to Charles of Anjou, Huitace de Fontaines, Béatrice d'Audenarde and Colart le Boutellier. His chanson "Je n'ëusse ja chanté" was "crowned" (couronnée) by the Puy d'Arras, and ten later poems are modeled on works ascribed to him. Roussiaus le Taillier sought to flatter him in his Arras est escole de tous biens entendre.

Fresco dates the poems to the third quarter of the thirteenth century. Gillebert appears in the necrology of the jongleurs and bourgeois of Arras as being celebrated in a mass at Pentecost 1270, so he must have died between this commemorative mass and the previous one (i.e. some time between 2 Feb and 1 June 1270). A performance of the jeu parti between Gillebert and Henry III of Brabant can be found here.

== Sources ==
- Theodore Karp. "Gillebert de Berneville" Grove Music Online. Oxford Music Online. Oxford University Press, accessed 5 April 2013.

== Editions ==
- Karen Fresco, ed. (1988) Gillebert de Berneville: Les Poésies. Geneva: Droz.
