= Adam de la Bassée =

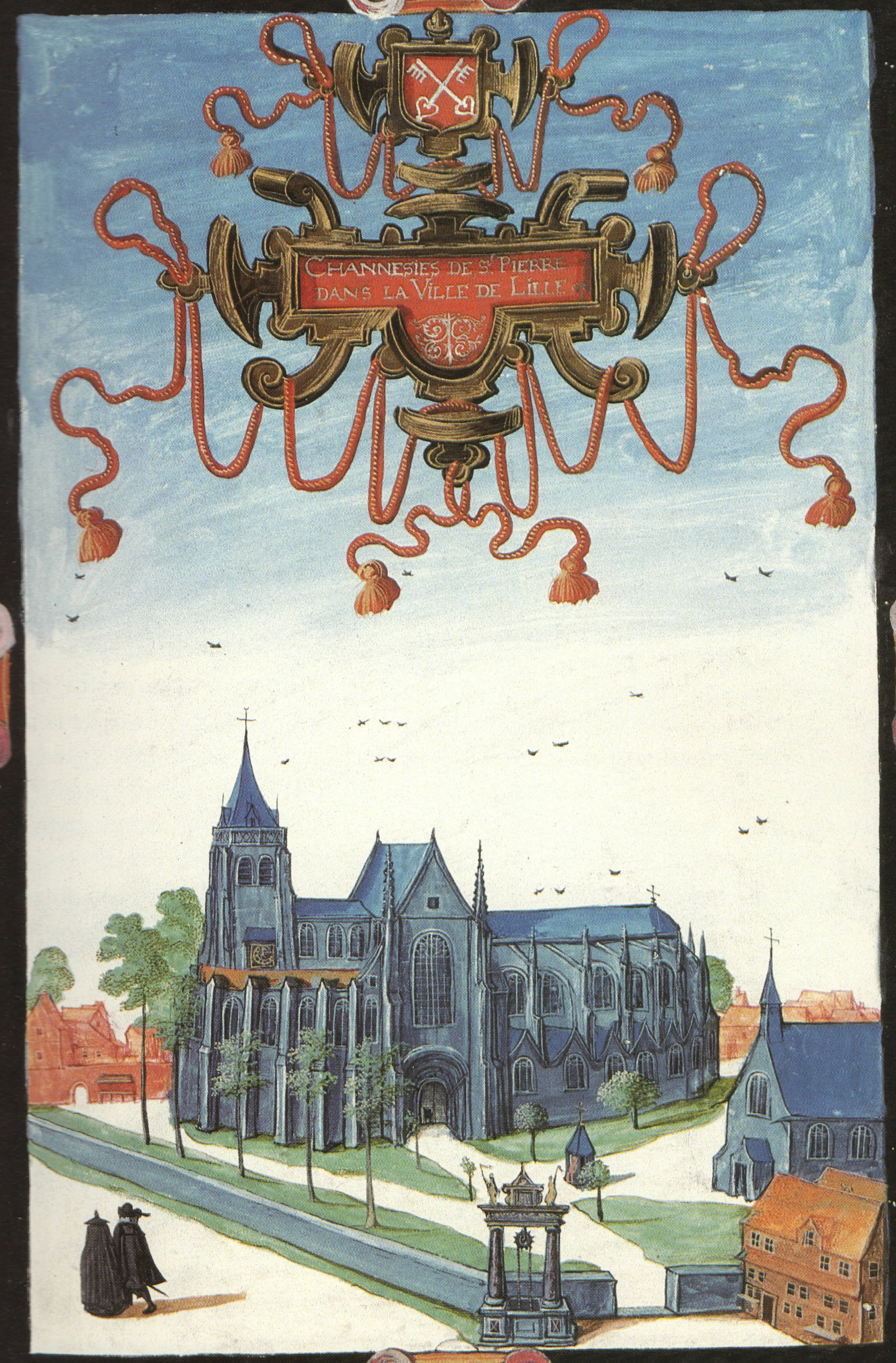
An 18th-century illustration of Saint Pierre de Lille

Adam de la Bassée (died 25 February 1286) was a canon of the collegiate church of Saint Pierre in Lille, and a poet and musician associated with the circle of trouvères around Arras. Around 1280, he composed the Ludus super Anticlaudianum ("Play on the Anticlaudianus"), a rhyming paraphrase of Alain de Lille's poem Anticlaudianus. The Ludus is conserved in one known manuscript, F-Lm 316 in the Bibliothèque Municipale Jean Levy in Lille, which may be in part a work of Adam's own hand.

Adam's influence can be seen in the romans composed around Lille, and possibly also in the Jeu de Robin et Marion, written by Adam de la Halle after he left Arras in 1283. The form of the Ludus, "a comprehensive musical anthology ... in which almost every contemporary sacred and secular style is represented", may have been copied directly for the Roman de Fauvel, composed around 1316. Adam was probably not advanced in age when he died, since his sister was alive twenty years later.

== Ludus super Anticlaudianum ==
According to the work's prologue, Adam composed it for personal enjoyment while he was ill. This must have been between 1279 and 1285, and his first editor, Abbé Bayart, favoured his having written it in one season in 1279. His re-working of the Anticlaudianus leaves it simpler, more overtly Christian and less academic.

The Ludus has the same plot and message as the Anticlaudianus, but the allegory and the breadth are much reduced, making the Ludus read more like a vernacular romance than a medieval Latin dialogue. The most interesting aspect of the Ludus is the presence of thirty-eight (38) musical pieces with (semi-)sacred lyrics interspersed throughout the work. Of these, thirty-six (36) are monophonic and two polyphonic, while twenty are contrafacta whose models are usually named explicitly in the rubrics that accompany the music. The musical notation of the Ludus is that of the secular chansonniers or of plainchant.

One of the original pieces is an Agnus Dei in two-parts conductus. Among the other pieces, by genre there are hymns, sequentiae, responsories (including a processional antiphon), an alleluia, chansons, dances (a notula and a rondeau), a pastourelle and a polyphonic motet. Of his contrafacta, his models can be classified as either widely available—as in the songs of King Theobald I of Navarre and Duke Henry III of Brabant, and the sequentia Letabundus—or of local provenance and popularity, as in two chants to Saints Peter and Elizabeth.

== Works ==
- Paul Bayart, ed. Ludus super Anticlaudianum. Tourcoing, 1930.
