= Perrot de Neele =

Perrot (Peron, Peros, or Pierrot) de Neele (fl. mid–late 13th century) was an Artesian trouvère and littérateur. He composed four jeux partis in collaboration with Jehan Bretel (died 1272): "Amis Peron de Neele"; "Jehan Bretel, respondés"; "Pierrot de Neele, amis"; and "Pierrot, li ques vaut pis a fin amant". Perrot also composed one song in praise of the Virgin Mary, "Douce vierge, röine nete et pure", with a melody that is in bar form. Finally, there survives in manuscript B.N. fr. 375 a collection of narrative verse (or "classic literary works") entitled Sommaires en vers de poèmes and compiled by Perrot, who identifies himself in a colophon at the end of the work:

Ce fist Peros de Neele, qui en trover tos s'escrevele.

Peros de Neele made this, who nearly broke down in tears while writing.

This manuscript has sometimes been dated to 1288 because of a colophon to the copy of the Roman de Troie which it contains. This copy was finished in 1288 by Jehan Madot. The manuscript was the work of at least five scribes, as five different hands have been identified in its texts. Probably it was put together in the early fourteenth century. Perrot's Sommaire serves as a table of contents for the entire codex, summarising in verse the narrative romances contained within. It has been suggested that Perrot may have been the compiler of the manuscript, if not one of its scribes. He may also be the author of the fabliau La vielle Truande, which he calls De le Viellete in his contents.
