= Pierre le Borgne (trouvère) =

Li louseignols in the Chansonnier du Roi

Li louseignols in the Chansonnier Saint-Germain-des-Prés

Pierre le Borgne (Old French: Pieros li Borgnes) was a trouvère from Lille active in the reign of King Louis IX (r. 1226–1270).

Pierre probably belonged to the Le Borgne family of Lille. Arthur Dinaux identified Pierre with the Trésorier de Lille. He was followed by Henri Pajot and tentatively by Robert Linker. Auguste Scheler rejected the identification.

Just a single grand chant is attributed to Pierre, Li louseignols que j'oi chanter ('The nightingale that I hear singing'). It is found in trouvère chansonniers C, K, M, N, P, T, U and X. In most of these it is anonymous, but in M (Chansonnier du Roi) and T (Chansonnier de Noailles), it is attributed. Its presence in U (Chansonnier Saint-Germain-des-Prés) allows Pierre's activity to be dated to before 1270. It served as a model for the anonymous song Hé! Dieus! por quoi n'est bien amés.

== Bibliography ==
- Linker, Robert White (1979). A Bibliography of Old French Lyrics. Romance Monographs.
- Pajot, Henri (1864). Les poètes de Lille. Imprimerie de Horemans.
- Petit, Aimé (2021). "Trouvères lillois". Nord'. 78 (2): 91–107. doi:10.3917/nord.078.0091.
