= Pierre le Borgne =

Pierre le Borgne ("Peter the One-Eyed") may refer to:

- Pierre le Borgne (trouvère)
- Peter Monoculus (died 1185), Cistercian abbot of Igny and Clairvaux
