= Golias =

Golias may refer to:

- Ronald Golias (1929–2005), Brazilian comedian and actor
- Vasilis Golias (born 1985), Greek football player
- Golias, the legendary instigator of the Goliards during the Middle Ages
- Apocalypse of Golias, a satirical 12th-century Latin poem
