= Jehan le Cuvelier d'Arras =

13th-century French trouvère

Jehan le Cuvelier d'Arras (fl. c. 1240–70) was a trouvère associated with the so-called "school of Arras". He may be the same person as Johannes Cuvellarius from Bapaume, a suburb of Arras, who is mentioned in documents of 1258. He was the respondent in nine jeux partis and judge of six; he also composed six chansons courtoises. His six chansons are:

- Amours est une merveille
- Anuis et desesperance
- J'ai une dame enamee
- Jolivetés et joenece
- Mout me plaisent a sentir
- Pour la meillour qu'onques formast Nature

This last one can be approximately dated, since it is dedicated to Wagon Wion, sheriff (échevin) of Arras in 1265 and dead by February 1273. Cuvelier's chansons are predominantly heptasyllabic, although one (Pour la meillour) is decasyllabic and there are pentasyllabic lines in the others. All are in bar form with the exception of Amours est, which is AA'BB'CC'DE. The use of motives in the caudae is typical. Unusual for his place and time he favoured plagal modes, save for the authentic J'ai une dame. In the readings of the music for Amours est, Mout me plaisent, and Pour la meillour found in the Chansonnier Cangé (BnF fr.846), there is evidence of modal rhythm. Ligatures in Anuis et desesperance and Jolivetés also suggest the "free use" of modal rhythm.

Cuvelier debated Jehan de Grieviler in Cuvelier, un jugement and Gamart de Vilers in Cuvelier, j'ain mieus que moi. Gamart addressed Cuvelier as "sire", an indication of his rank. They submitted their debate to the judgement of the Dame de Fouencamp. Cuvelier's most popular debating partner was Jehan Bretel, who initiated six juex partis with him:

- Cuvelier, dites moi voir
- Cuvelier, et vous, Ferri (also addressed to Lambert Ferri)
- Cuvelier, or i parra
- Cuvelier, s'il est ainsi
- Cuvelier, vous amerés
- Je vous demant, Cuvelier, espondés

Bretel and Ferri joined up to propose a jeu with Cuvelier and the Tresorier d'Aire: Biaus sire tresorier d'Aire. Cuvelier also judged a jeu parti involving Adam de la Halle.
