= 1732 in South Africa =

- Decades
- See also: List of years in South Africa

The following lists events that happened during 1732 in South Africa.

== Incumbents ==
- Governor of the Cape Colony - Jan de la Fontaine

== Events ==
- The VOC revises land tenure to control Trek Boers and enforce rent on the leningplaatsen.
- Cape Colony farmers are reimbursed for fixed improvements if land is returned after its tenure.
- The Maputo slave post is abandoned by the VOC due to a mutiny.
- The Trek Boers settle along the Olifants River.
- Hercules Mahieu, a Cape official, marries Arnoldina Hendrica Pothof from Breda.
- The Netherlands abolishes property confiscation for treason.
