= Mahieu =

Mahieu is both a surname and a given name. Notable people with the name include:

Surname:

- Albert Mahieu (1860-1926), French politician.
- Jacques de Mahieu (1915–1990), French Argentine anthropologist and Peronist
- Jesse Mahieu (born 1978), Dutch field hockey player
- Thomas Mahieu, 16th-century French politician and bibliophile

Given name:

- Mahieu de Gant, Flemish trouvère
- Mahieu le Juif, French trouvère
- Mahieu de Quercy, French troubadour

== See also ==
- Matthew (disambiguation)
