= Mahieu de Gant =

Flemish trouvère

Mahieu de Gant (fl. mid–late 13th century) was a Flemish trouvère (poet-composer) from Ghent associated with the so-called "school of Arras". He has been conflated with Mahieu le Juif, but the same manuscript containing both their works clearly distinguishes them. His career can only be dated because of those with whom he composed jeux partis, which includes Robert de la Piere, who died in 1258. All of Mahieu's melodies are in bar form.

== List of songs ==
Chansons

- Con plus ain et mains ai joie (RS 1723) in trouvère MSS a, fol.66.
- De faire chançon envoisie (RS 1144) in trouvère MSS M and T.
- Je serf Amours a mon pooir (RS 1810) in trouvère MSS M and T.
- Onques de chant en ma vie (RS 1228) in trouvère MSS K, N, and X.

Jeux partis

- Mahieu de Gant, respondés a ce (with Robert de la Piere)
- Mahieu de Gant respondés a moi (with Robert de la Piere; no music)
- Mahieu, je vous part, compains (with Colart le Changeur)
- Mahieu, jugiez, se une dame amoie (with Henry Amion)
