= Jehan Bretel =

French trouvère (c. 1210–1272)

Jehan Bretel (c.1210 – 1272) was a trouvère. Of his known oeuvre of probably 97 songs, 96 have survived. Judging by his contacts with other trouvères he was famous and popular. Seven works by other trouvères (Jehan de Grieviler, Jehan Erart, Jaques le Vinier, Colart le Boutellier, and Mahieu de Gant) are dedicated to Bretel and he was for a time the "Prince" of the Puy d'Arras.

Bretel held the hereditary post of sergeant at the Abbey of Saint Vaast in Arras, in which capacity he oversaw the rights of the abbacy on the river Scarpe. He is referred to as sergens iretavles de la riviere Saint-Vaast in a document of 1256. His father, Jehan, had held this same post from 1241 (at the latest) until his death in 1244. His grandfather, Jacques, was described as sergent héréditaire around the turn of the century, when there were eight such officials associated with the abbey. The trouvère and his brother were modestly wealthy property owners near Arras, where Jehan died in 1272.

Bretel wrote eight known chansons courtoises, of which seven survive. Bretel dedicated the chanson Li miens chanters to the countess Beatrice, wife of William III of Dampierre and sister of Henry III, Duke of Brabant.

Bretel also participated in eighty-nine jeux partis, nearly half of all recorded jeux partis. Many of these are assigned on the basis of internal evidence (the poets are often named) since they lack rubrics. A few of these are addressed only to a Sire Jehan or just Sire and their ascription to Bretel, though likely, is not certain. About forty different poets from the region around Arras participated in these jeux partis, either as judges or correspondents. Generally these poems are grouped with others by Bretel in the chansonniers, even if he did not initiate them, though those he initiated with the famous trouvère Adam de la Halle are usually grouped with Adam's works.

== List of works ==
=== Chansons courtoises ===
- Jamais nul jour de ma vie
- Je ne chant pas de grant joliveté
- Li grans desirs de deservir amie
- Li miens chanters ne puet plaire
- Mout liement me fait Amours chanter
- Onques nul jour ne chantai
- Poissans Amours a mon cuer espiié

=== Jeux partis ===
- With Adam de la Halle
  - Adan, amis, je vous dis une fois
  - Adan, amis, mout savés bien vo roi
  - Adan, a moi respondés
  - Adan, d'amours vous demant
  - Adan, du quel cuidiés vous, no music
  - Adan, li qués doit mieus trouver merchi
  - Adan, mout fu Aristotes sachans
  - Adan, qui aroit amee
  - Adan, se vous amiés bien loiaument
  - Adan, s'il estoit ensi
  - Adan, si soit que ma feme amés tant
  - Adan, vauriés vous manoir
  - Adan, vous devés savoir
  - Avoir cuidai engané le marchié
  - Compains Jehan, un gieus vous vueil partir
  - Sire, assés sage vous voi, proposed by Adam, no music
  - Sire Jehan, ainc ne fustes partis, proposed by Adam
- With Audefroi
  - J'aim par amours et on moi ensement, proposed by Audefroi
  - Sire Audefroi, qui par traïson droite
- With Jehan le Cuvelier d'Arras
  - Cuvelier, dites moi voir, no music
  - Cuvelier, or i parra
  - Cuvelier, s'il est ainsi, two melodies
  - Cuvelier, vous amerés
  - Je vous demant, Cuvelier, espondés, no music
- With Gaidifer d'Avion
  - Gaidifer, d'un jeu parti
  - Gaidifer, par courtoisie
- With Gerart de Boulogne
  - Sire Jehan, vous amerez, proposed by Gerart, no music
- With Jehan de Grieviler
  - Conseilliez moi, Jehan de Grieviler
  - Grieviler, a ma requeste, no music
  - Grieviler, del quel doit estre
  - Grieviler, deus dames sai d'une beauté
  - Grieviler, deus dames sont
  - Grieviler, dites moi voir, no music
  - Grieviler, feme avés prise
  - Grieviler, ja en ma vie, no music
  - Grieviler, par maintes fies
  - Grieviler, par quel raison, no music
  - Grieviler, par vo bapteme
  - Grieviler, se vous aviés
  - Grieviler, se vous quidiés
  - Grieviler, s'il avenoit, no music
  - Grieviler, un jugement
  - Grieviler, vostre ensient, two melodies
  - Grieviler, vostre pensee
  - Jehan Bretel, une jolie dame, proposed by Grieviler
  - Jehan Bretel, vostre avis, proposed by Grieviler
  - Jehan de Grieviler, deus dames sai, no music
  - Jehan de Grieviler, sage
  - Jehan de Grieviler, s'aveuc celi, no music
  - Jehan de Grieviler, une
  - Jehan de Grieviler, un jugement, no music
  - Prince del Pui, mout bien savés trouver, proposed by Grieviler
  - Respondés a ma demande, two melodies
  - Sire Bretel, je vous vueill demander, proposed by Grieviler, no music
  - Sire Bretel, vous qui d'amours savez, proposed by Grieviler, no music
- With Jehan de Marli
  - Maistre Jehan de Marli, respondés
- With Jehan de Renti
  - Jehan Bretel, un chevalier, proposed by Jehan de Renti, no music
- With Jehan Simon
  - Jehan Simon, li quieus s'aquita mieus, two melodies
- With Jehan de Vergelai
  - Jehan de Vergelai, vostre ensïent
- With Lambert Ferri:
  - Amis Lambert Ferri, vous trouverés
  - Entendés, Lambert Ferri
  - Ferri, a vostre ensïent
  - Ferri, il sont doi amant
  - Ferri, il sont dui fin loial amant, no music
  - Ferri, se ja Dieus vous voie
  - Ferri, se vous bien amiés
  - Jehan Bretel, par raison, proposed by Lambert, two melodies
  - Lambert Ferri, drois est ke m'entremete, no music
  - Lambert Ferri, je vous part
  - Lambert Ferri, li quieus doit mieus avoir
  - Lambert Ferri, s'une dame orgeilleuse
  - Lambert, il sont doi amant
  - Lambert, se vous amiés bien loiaument
  - Lambert, une amie avés
  - Prince del Pui, selonc vostre pensee, proposed by Lambert
  - Sire Bretel, entendés, proposed by Lambert
  - Sire Jehan Bretel, vous demant gié, proposed by Lambert, no music
- With Mahieu li Taillere
  - A vous, Mahieu li Taillere
- With Perrin d'Angicourt
  - Perrin d'Angicourt, respondés
  - Prince del Pui, vous avés, proposed by Perrin
- With Perrot de Neele
  - Amis Pierot de Neele
  - Jehan Bretel, respondés, proposed by Perrot
  - Pierrot de Neele, amis, no music
  - Pierot, li ques vaut pis a fin amant
- With Prieus de Boulogne
  - Sire Prieus de Boulogne, no music
- With Robert de Castel
  - Robert du Chastel, biaus sire
- With Robin de Compiegne
  - Sire Jehan Bretel, conseill vous prie, proposed by Robin, no music
- With Robert de la Piere
  - Robert de la Piere, repondés moi
- With more than two
  - Biaus sire tresorier d'Aire, proposed jointly by Bretel and Lambert Ferri to Jehan le Cuvelier d'Arras and the Tresorier d'Aire
  - Cuvelier et vous, Ferri, proposed by Bretel to Jehan le Cuvelier d'Arras, Lambert Ferri, and Jehan de Grieviler

== Sources ==
- Karp, Theodore. "Bretel, Jehan." Grove Music Online. Oxford Music Online. Accessed 12 November 2008.
