= Pierre Gustave Brunet =

French bibliographer, historian and editor

Pierre Gustave Brunet (18 November 1805 – 24 January 1896) was a French bibliographer, historian and editor.

He wrote reference books on dialects and historical studies on Bordeaux, some of them in collaboration with the Belgian lawyer, archivist, diplomat, author and historian Octave Delepierre, which were published under the collective pseudonym of "les frères Gébéodé" (the Gébéodé brothers).

== Works ==
- (ed.) Poèsies basques de Bernard Dechepare, recteur de Saint-Michel-le-Vieux, Publiéés d'après l'édition de Bordeaux, 1545, et traduites pour la première fois en fraçais, 1847.
- (ed.) Histoire maccaronique de Merlin Coccaie : prototype de Rabelais ou est traicté les ruses de Cingar, les tours de Boccal, les adventures de Léonard, les forces de Fracasse, les enchantemens de Gelfore et Pandrague et les rencontres heureuses de Balde by Teofilo Folengo. 1859.
- Fantaisies bibliographiques, 1864
- La France littéraire au XVe siècle; ou, Catalogue raisonné des ouvrages en tout genre imprimés en langue franc̜aise jusqu'à l'an 1500, 1865
- Imprimeurs imaginaires et libraires supposés; étude bibliographique, suivie de recherches sur quelques ouvrages imprimés avec des indications fictives de lieux ou avec des dates singuliéres, 1866
- (ed.) Les sociétés badines, bachiques, littéraires et chantantes, leur histoire et leurs travaux by Arthur Dinaux. 1867.
- (ed.) Les supercheries littéraires dévoilées. Galerie des écrivains français de toute l'Europe qui se sont déguisés sous des anagrammes, des astéronymes, des cryptonymes, des initialismes, des noms littéraires, des pseudonymes facétieux ou bizarres, etc. by Joseph Marie Quérard. 1869.
- Dictionnaire des ouvrages anonymes [by Barbier], suivi des Supercheries littéraires dévoilées [by Quérard]; supplément à la dernière édition de ces deux ouvrages, 1889.
