= Moralium dogma philosophorum =

Moralium dogma philosophorum ("Teaching of the philosophers on moral questions") is a Latin work of the 12th century. Its authorship is uncertain: it has been attributed to William of Conches, to Walter of Châtillon and (less likely) to Alan of Lille. Parallels exist between this work, the anonymous Ysagoge in theologiam (written between 1141 and 1157), and the text De virtutibus et vitiis by Alan of Lille (written between 1155 and 1165).

The attribution to William of Conches was proposed in 1890 by Bernard Hauréau. It was widely accepted until 1931 when John R. Williams proposed it was written by Walter of Châtillon. In 1948 P. Glorieux advanced the idea that Alan of Lille was the author.
