= Jacques de Cysoing =

Jacques de Cysoing was a late thirteenth-century Franco-Flemish trouvère. He wrote nine songs that survive, all of them with their melodies.

Probably born into a noble Flemish family in Cysoing, "messire" Jacques probably flourished during the reign of Guy of Dampierre as Count of Flanders (1251–1305), for he addresses his serventois Li nouviaus tans to the count. Other events that date Jacques are a reference to the Battle of Mansurah in 1250 in one of his songs and a reference in an envoi of Thomas Herier to "Jakemon" at "Cyson", probably in the third quarter of the century.

All of Jacques's musical compositions are in ABABx form and are preserved in only a few manuscripts, but one, Nouvele amour, exists in eight different versions, including two contrafacta. The popularity of this one piece is probably explained by its rondeau form, though the original text is not a rondeau. Jacques's song Quant la saisons is a chanson avec des refrains in which each of the eight stanzas has a different refrain and some of these refrains are found in other songs.
