= Alain de Lille =

French theologian and poet (c. 1128 – c. 1202)

Blessed Alan of Lille O. Cist.
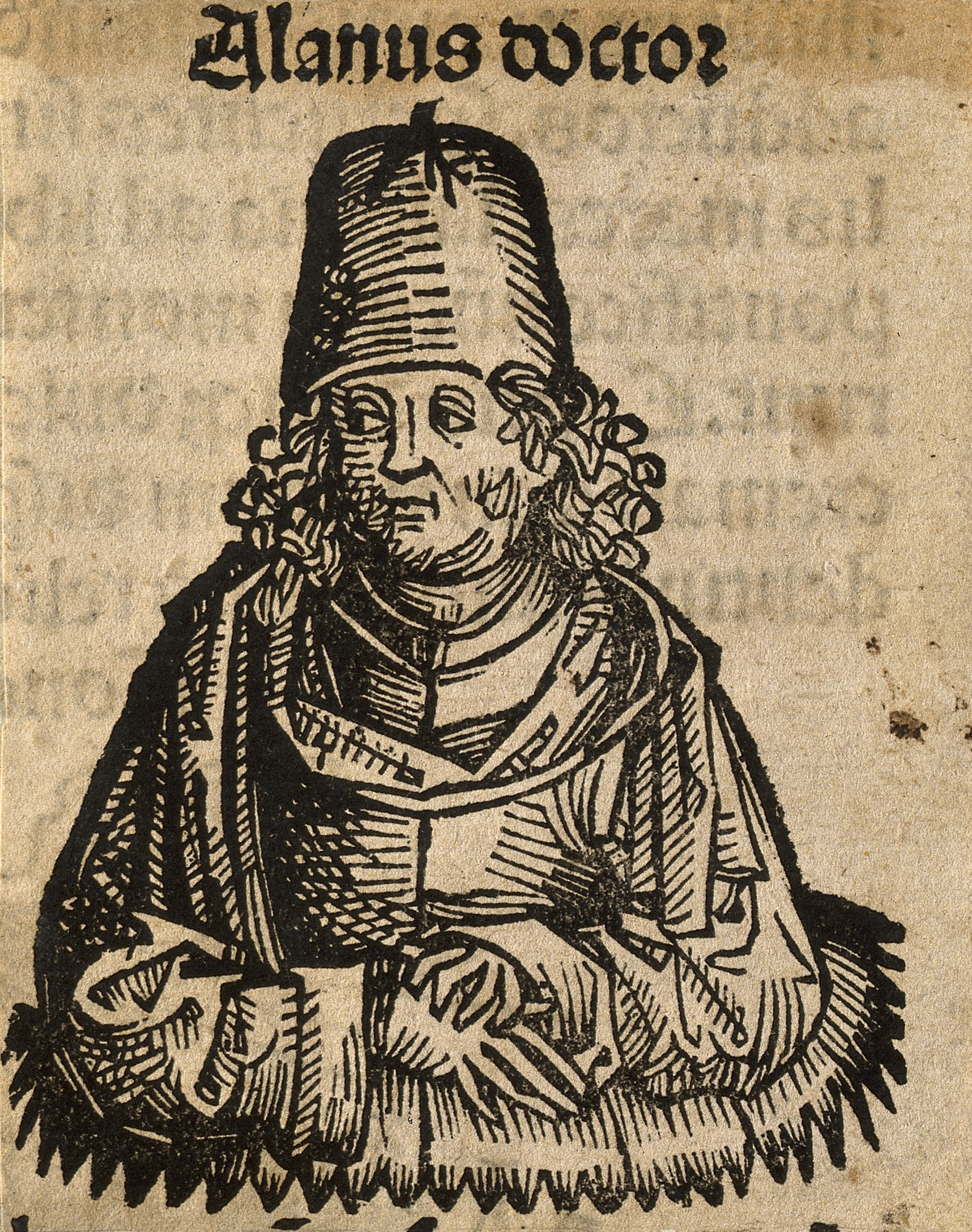
- Born: 1128(?); Lille, France
- Died: 1202–1203
- Venerated in: Catholic Church
- Feast: 30 January (Benedictines; Cistercians)
- Influences: Aristotle; Pythagoras; Neoplatonism; Hermes Trismegistus; Peter Abelard; Gilbert de la Porrée; Thierry of Chartres; Boethius
- Influenced: Thomas Aquinas; Bonaventure; Dante Alighieri

Alain de Lille (Alan of Lille; Latin: Alanus ab Insulis; c. 1128 – 1202/1203) was a French theologian and poet. He was born in Lille some time before 1128. His exact date of death remains unclear as well, with most research pointing toward it being between 14 April 1202 and 5 April 1203. He is known for writing a number of works based upon the teachings of the liberal arts, with one of his most renowned poems, De planctu Naturae ("The Complaint of Nature"), focusing on sexual conduct among humans. Although Alain was widely known during his lifetime, little is known about his personal life.

As a theologian, Alain de Lille opposed scholasticism in the second half of the 12th century. His philosophy is characterized by rationalism and mysticism. Alain claimed that reason, guided by prudence, could discover most truths about the physical order without help; but to understand religious truth and to know God, the wise must be believers.

== Life ==
Little is known of his life. Alain entered the schools no earlier than the late 1140s; first attending the school at Paris, and then at Chartres. He probably studied under masters such as Peter Abelard, Gilbert of Poitiers, and Thierry of Chartres. This is known through the writings of John of Salisbury, who is thought to have been a contemporary student of Alain of Lille. Alain's earliest writings were probably written in the 1150s, and probably in Paris. He spent many years as a professor of theology at the University of Paris and he attended the Lateran Council in 1179. Though the only accounts of his lectures seem to show a sort of eccentric style and approach, he was said to have been good friends with many other masters at the school in Paris, and taught there, as well as some time in southern France, into his old age. He afterwards inhabited Montpellier (he is sometimes called Alanus de Montepessulano), lived for a time outside the walls of any cloister, and finally retired to Cîteaux, where he died in 1202.

He had a very widespread reputation during his lifetime, and his knowledge caused him to be called Doctor Universalis. Many of Alain's writings cannot be exactly dated, and the circumstances surrounding his writing are often unknown as well. It does seem clear that his first notable work, Summa Quoniam Homines, was completed between 1155 and 1165, with the most conclusive date being 1160, and was probably developed through his lectures at the school in Paris. Among his numerous works two poems entitle him to a distinguished place in the Latin literature of the Middle Ages; one of these, the De planctu Naturae, is an ingenious satire on the vices of humanity. He created the allegory of grammatical "conjugation" which was to have its successors throughout the Middle Ages. The Anticlaudianus, a treatise on morals as allegory, the form of which recalls the pamphlet of Claudian against Rufinus, is agreeably versified and relatively pure in its latinity.

== Theology and philosophy ==
As a theologian Alain de Lille shared in the mystic reaction of the second half of the 12th century against the scholastic philosophy. His mysticism, however, is far from being as absolute as that of the Victorines. In the Anticlaudianus he sums up as follows: Reason, guided by prudence, can unaided discover most of the truths of the physical order; for the apprehension of religious truths it must trust to faith. This rule is completed in his treatise, Ars catholicae fidei, as follows: Theology itself may be demonstrated by reason. Alain even ventures an immediate application of this principle, and tries to prove geometrically the dogmas defined in the Christian creed. This bold attempt is entirely factitious and verbal, and it is only his employment of various terms not generally used in such a connection (axiom, theorem, corollary, etc.) that gives his treatise its apparent originality.

Alan's philosophy was a sort of mixture of Aristotelian logic and Neoplatonic philosophy. The Platonist seemed to outweigh the Aristotelian in Alan, but he felt strongly that the divine is all intelligibility and argued this notion through much Aristotelian logic combined with Pythagorean mathematics.

== Works and attributions ==
One of Alain's most notable works was one he modeled after Boethius’ Consolation of Philosophy, to which he gave the title De planctu Naturae, or The Plaint of Nature, and which was most likely written in the late 1160s. In this work, Alan uses prose and verse to illustrate the way in which nature defines its own position as inferior to that of God. He also attempts to illustrate the way in which humanity, through sexual perversion and specifically homosexuality, has defiled itself from nature and God. In Anticlaudianus, another of his notable works, Alan uses a poetical dialogue to illustrate the way in which nature comes to the realization of her failure in producing the perfect man. She has only the ability to create a soulless body, and thus she is "persuaded to undertake the journey to heaven to ask for a soul," and "the Seven Liberal Arts produce a chariot for her... the Five Senses are the horses". The Anticlaudianus was translated into French and German in the following century, and toward 1280 was re-worked into a musical anthology by Adam de la Bassée. One of Alan's most popular and widely distributed works is his manual on preaching, Ars Praedicandi, or The Art of Preaching. This work shows how Alan saw theological education as being a fundamental preliminary step in preaching and strove to give clergyman a manuscript to be "used as a practical manual" when it came to the formation of sermons and art of preaching.

Alain wrote three very large theological textbooks, one being his first work, Summa Quoniam Homines. Another of his theological textbooks, that strove to be more minute in its focus, is his De Fide Catholica, dated somewhere between 1185 and 1200, Alan sets out to refute heretical views, specifically that of the Waldensians and Cathars. In his third theological textbook, Regulae Caelestis Iuris, he presents a set of what seems to be theological rules; this was typical of the followers of Gilbert of Poitiers, of which Alan could be associated. Other than these theological textbooks, and the aforementioned works of the mixture of prose and poetry, Alan of Lille had numerous other works on numerous subjects, primarily including Speculative Theology, Theoretical Moral Theology, Practical Moral Theology, and various collections of poems.

Alain de Lille has often been confounded with other persons named Alain, in particular with another Alanus (Alain, bishop of Auxerre), Alan, abbot of Tewkesbury, Alain de Podio, etc. Certain facts of their lives have been attributed to him, as well as some of their works: thus the Life of St Bernard should be ascribed to Alain of Auxerre and the Commentary upon Merlin to Alan of Tewkesbury. Alan of Lille was not the author of a Memoriale rerum difficilium, published under his name, nor of Moralium dogma philosophorum, nor of the satirical Apocalypse of Golias once attributed to him; and it is exceedingly doubtful whether the Dicta Alani de lapide philosophico really issued from his pen. On the other hand, it now seems practically demonstrated that Alain de Lille was the author of the Ars catholicae fidei and the treatise Contra haereticos.

In his sermons on capital sins, Alain argued that sodomy and homicide are the most serious sins, since they call forth the wrath of God, which led to the destruction of Sodom and Gomorrah. His chief work on penance, the Liber poenitenitalis dedicated to Henry de Sully, exercised great influence on the many manuals of penance produced as a result of the Fourth Lateran Council. Alain's identification of the sins against nature included bestiality, masturbation, oral and anal intercourse, incest, adultery and rape. In addition to his battle against moral decay, Alan wrote a work against Islam, Judaism and Christian heretics dedicated to William VIII of Montpellier.

== List of known works ==
- De planctu Naturae
- Anticlaudianus
- Rhythmus de Incarnatione et de Septem Artibus
- De Miseria Mundi
- Quaestiones Alani Textes
- Summa Quoniam Homines
- Regulae Theologicae
- Hierarchia Alani
- De Fide Catholica: Contra Haereticos, Valdenses, Iudaeos et Paganos
- De Virtutibus, de Vitiis, de Donis Spiritus Sancti
- Liber Parabolarum
- Distinctiones Dictionum Theologicalium
- Elucidatio in Cantica Canticorum
- Glosatura super Cantica
- Expositio of the Pater Noster
- Expositiones of the Nicene and Apostolic Creeds
- Expositio Prosae de Angelis
- Quod non-est celebrandum bis in die
- Liber Poenitentialis
- De Sex Alis Cherubim
- Ars Praedicandi
- Sermones

== Translations ==
- Alan of Lille, A Concise Explanation of the Song of Songs in Praise of the Virgin Mary, trans Denys Turner, in Denys Turner, Eros and Allegory: Medieval Exegesis of the Song of Songs, (Kalamazoo, MI: Cistercian Publications, 1995), 291–308
- The Plaint of Nature, translated by James J Sheridan, (Toronto: Pontifical Institute of Mediaeval Studies, 1980)
- Anticlaudian: Prologue, Argument and Nine Books, edited by W. H. Cornog, (Philadelphia, 1935)
