= Hugues IV de Berzé =

Knight and trouvère from the Mâconnais

Hugues as depicted in the Chansonnier d'Arras.

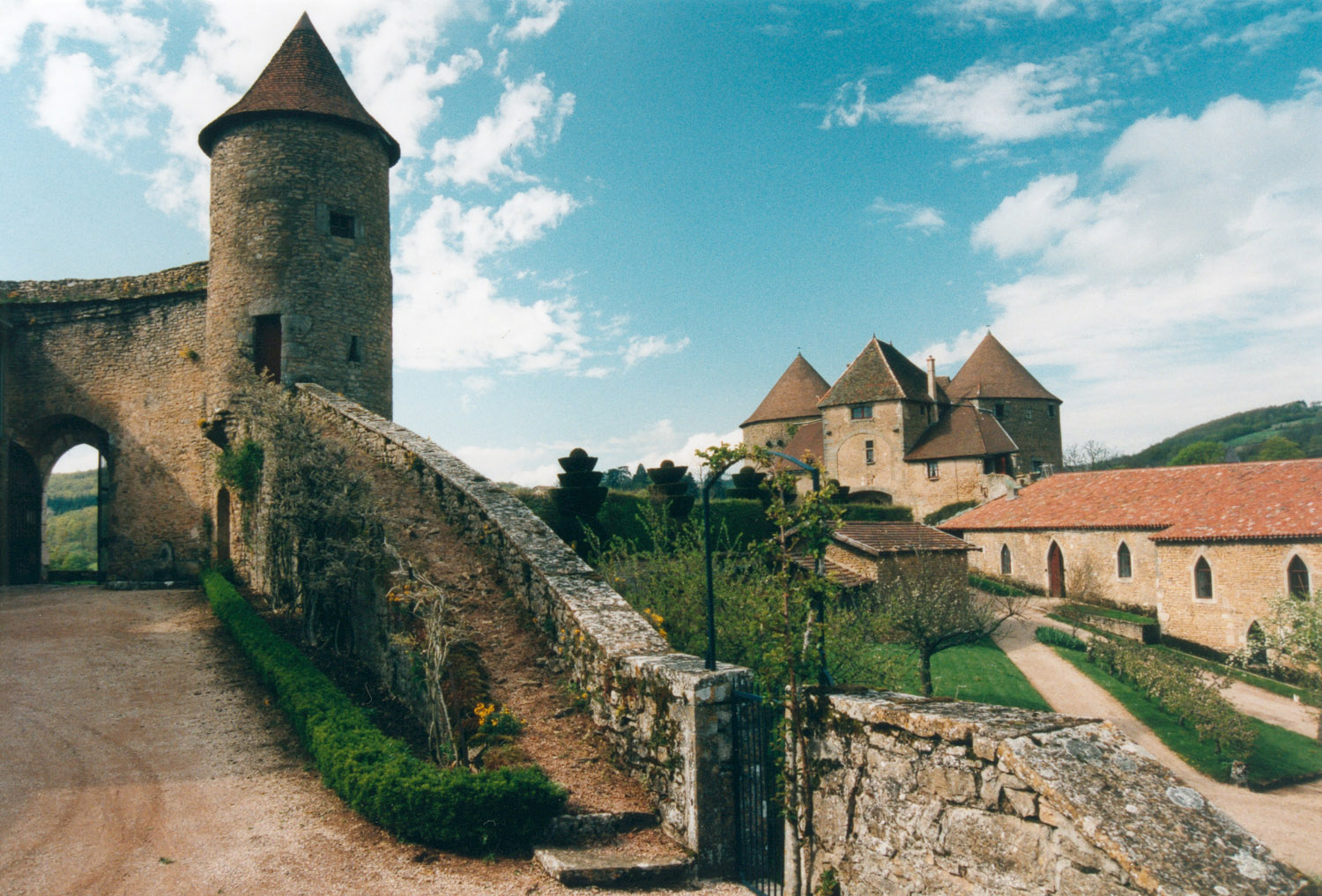
The castle at Berzé-le-Châtel, where Hugues lived and ruled.

Hugues IV de Berzé (or Bregi; 1150/1155 – 1220) was a knight and trouvère from the Mâconnais. He participated in the Fourth Crusade in 1201 and the Fifth Crusade in 1220. He was the lord of Berzé-le-Châtel.

Hugues wrote at least five lyric poems that are preserved in various chansonniers. His last one was written to the troubadour Falquet de Romans, asking his friend to participate in the Crusade with him outra mar. Hugues sent his poem with the jongleur Bernart d'Argentau, forming an important source of information about both poets. According to Hugues, neither he nor Falquet were young at the time. Hugues was dead by August 1220, which provides an ante quem date for the poem. Hugues is referred to as N'Ugo de Bersie in the Occitan razo that accompanies the poem in the chansonnier.

His most famous Old French work is La Bible au seigneur de Barzil, a poem of 1,029 octosyllables preaching the reform of the Church. Hugues was influenced by his time in Constantinople and by "the certainty of death and the uncertainty of his times", when the Crusades were generally failures and the Cathar heresy was rampant in southern France. Hugues has criticism for all three social classes (nobility, clergy, and peasantry). Hugues's Bible is in the same category as the slightly earlier Bible Guiot of Guiot de Provins. La Bible exemplifies "the beliefs of a pious layman with a considerable breadth of worldly experience".

In the late sixteenth century, Hugues's Bible furnished much historical evidence for the antiquarian works of Claude Fauchet.

== Sources ==
- Boulton, Maureen B. M. "Hugues de Berzé" (p. 462). Medieval France: An Encyclopedia, ed. William W. Kibler. New Jersey: Routledge University Press, 1995. ISBN 0-8240-4444-4.
- Lecoy, Félix. "Pour la chronologie de Hugues de Berzé." Romania 67 (1942–1943): 243–254.
- Riquer, Martín de. Los trovadores: historia literaria y textos. 3 vol. Barcelona: Planeta, 1975.
