= Raoul de Beauvais =

Medieval French troubador

Raoul de Beauvais (fl. mid-13th century) was a trouvère from northeast of Paris. His period of activity is estimated based on his works being clumped with those of other mid-13th-century trouvères in the chansonniers. Six songs are attributed to him, with three also being (probably wrongly) attributed to Jehan Erart. They exhibit a great variety of poetical and musical forms.

All six songs contain refrains. Both Quant la sesons renouvelle and El mois de mai par un matin (also attributed to Erart) are pastourelles. Especially interesting is the contrast between the stanza and refrain in Deles un pre verdoiant (also attributed to Erart). Each four-line stanza contains three open cadences (every line but the last), but the three-line refrain uses closed cadences. Melodically, however, both the opening lines of the stanzas and of the refrain are similar. Besides these three pieces, Raoul also wrote:

- Au dieu d'amors ai requis un don
- Remembrance de bone amour
- Puis que d'Amours m'estuet chanter (also attributed to Erart)
