= Dame Maroie =

The song "Je vous pri, dame Maroie" in the Chansonnier d'Arras

Dame Maroie or Maroie de Dregnau/Dergnau de Lille (fl. 13th century) was a trouvère from Arras, in Artois, France.

She was identified as the Maroie de Dregnau de Lille from whom a single strophe of a single chanson remains, "Mout m'abelist quant je voi revenir" (in a typical trouvère form, ABABCDE), along with its music.

She debates Dame Margot in a jeu parti, or debate song, "Je vous pri, dame Maroie." This song survives in two manuscripts, which each give separate and unrelated melodies. Dame Maroie is the addressee in a grand chant by Andrieu Contredit d'Arras.
