= Jehan Erart =

13th-century French composer

Jehan Erart (or Erars) (c.1200/10–1258/9) was a trouvère from Arras, particularly noted for his favouring the pastourelle genre. He has left behind eleven pastourelles, ten grand chants, and one serventois.

Erart's presence at Arras can be deduced from his own writings. He was patronised by the wealthy middle and upper classes. In his serventois, a complainte on the death his patron Gherart Aniel, he asked Pierre and Wagon Wion to help him obtain the patronage of the bankers Henri and Robert Crespin. His relationship with two Arras trouvères is apparent in his lyrics, Guillaume le Vinier and Jehan Bretel. He is also mentioned in a work of Guibert Kaukesel, a canon of Arras.

The chief characteristic of Erart's poetry is his preference for short lines, mostly penta-, hexa-, hepta-, and octosyllabic, as opposed to the traditional decasyllable, which does occur in his chansons "Pré ne vergier ne boscaige foillu" and "Encoire sui cil ki a merchi s'atent" and his serventois "Nus chanters". Musically, Erart is syllabic, with a preference for major modes and refrains. His chansons are composed mainly in isometre, but his pastourelles are predominantly heterometric. His music is conservative and rarely exceeds a ninth in range.

There are two death notices for Erart in the necrology of the Confrérie des jongleurs et bourgeois d'Arras. One records a Jehans Erardi dying in 1258 while another records Jehan Erart dying in 1259. It is possible, when considering that his works are preserved in two different sections of the Chansonnier du Roi, that there were two Jehan Erarts, but this is not likely. Three songs attributed to Jehan Erart in one manuscript probably belong to Raoul de Beauvais.

== List of compositions ==
The following compositions are ascribed to Jehan Erart by Robert White Linker.

=== Grands chants ===
Linker	RS	Incipit	Manuscript sources					Sources with attribution
154.1	1712	Amours dont je me cuidoie	M	T	a(104r)			MT
154.4	180	Bone amour qui son repaire	K	N	O			KN
154.6	1533	De legier l'entrepris	M	T	a(103v)			Ma
154.8	644	Encor sui cil qui a merci s'atent	T					T
154.10	204	Hardis sui en l'acointance	M	T				T
154.11	823a	Je ne cuidai mais chanter (tant m'en)	K	N	O			KN
154.12	1627	Je ne sai mès en quel guise (ne maintenir)	K	N	X	a(103r)		KNXa
154.16a	1914a	Li biaus tans ne la saisons del	a(102r)					(first stanza missing, but song in Jehan Erars section in a)
154.17	1663	Mes cuers n'est mie a moi	T					T
154.21	1240	Penser ne doit vilanie	K	M	N	P	T	KNP (attrib. Guiot de Dijon in M; attrib. Andrieu Contredit in T)
154.22	1801	Piecha c'on dist par mauvais oir	T					T
154.23	2055	Pré ne vergier ne boscage foillu	M	T				MT
154.24	474a	Tant ai seü en amours et trouvé	(mentioned only in index of MS a)					a (index)

=== Pastourelles ===
Linker	RS	Incipit	Manuscript sources					Sources with attribution
154.2	574	Au tans novel (Que cil oisel Chantent cler sor l'arbroie)	M					M
154.3	2005	Au tens pascour	K	N	P	T		KNT
154.5	570	Dehors Loncpre el bosquel	K	N	P	a(112v)		KNP (attrib. Gillebert de Berneville in a)
154.7	1375	El mois de mai par un matin	K	N	P			NP (attrib. Raoul de Beauvais in K)
154.9	1718	En Pascour un jour erroie	H(219v)	P	T	X	a(111r)	Ta
154.13	1361	L'autrier chevauchai mon chemin	M					M
154.14	558	L'autrier par une valée	M	T				MT
154.15	606	L'autrier une pastourele	M					M
154.16	993	Lés le breuil	M					M
154.19	86	Par un trés bel jour de mai	a(112v)	I(207v)				a
154.20	585	Pastorel (Lés un boschel)	M					M

=== Serventois ===
Linker	RS	Incipit	Genre	Manuscript sources	Sources with attribution
154.18	485	Nus chanters mais le mien cuer ne leece	serventois	T	T

=== Doubtful attributions ===
The following songs carry an attribution to Jehan Erars in at least one source but are not ascribed to Jehan Erars by Linker.

Linker	RS	Incipit	Attribution to Erars	Other attributions
59.3	19	Pour conforter mon corage	M (index only)	Ernoul le Viele (M)
18.3	73	Ier main pensis chevauchai	M (index only)	Ernoul Caupain (T)
213.2	368	Delés un pre verdoiant	N	Raoul de Beauvais (KPMesmes(lost)); Gilles li Vinier (T)
213.3	806	Puis que s'Amours m'estuet chanter	N	Raoul de Beauvais (KP)
228.6	823	Je ne cuidai mes chanter (en mon)	Chansonnier de Mesmes (lost)	Robert de la Piere (a)
145.4	962	L'autrier par un matinet (erroie)	M (index only)	Colart li Boutellier (KNPX); Jehan de Neuvile (MT)
59.6	973	Trespensant d'une amourete	M (index only)	Ernoul le Viele
59.4	1258	Quant voi le tans avrilier…	M (index only)	Ernoul le Viele
59.2	1365	Pensis chief enclin	M (index only)	Ernoul le Viele (M)
171.1	1540	L'autrier quant jors fu esclarcis	M (index only)	Lambert li aveugles (M)
167.1	1848	L'autrier pastoure seoit	M (index only)	Jocelin de Bruges (C)
