= Alain (bishop of Auxerre) =

Cistercian abbot and bishop

Alain (Alanus) (died 1185) was a Cistercian abbot of La Rivour, and bishop of Auxerre from 1152 to 1167. He was a close associate of Bernard of Clairvaux, who was instrumental in getting him appointed bishop, under commission from Pope Eugene III, after a dispute in the diocese. Alain was one of Bernard's biographers.

He was born in Flanders, near Lille, and has often been confused with the later Alain of Lille. The book Doctrinale altum seu liber parabolarum, published c. 1485 is by the latter Alain, who died in 1203.
