= Rundkanzone =

Musical bar form (ABAB/CB or AABA)

Rundkanzone [German: "rounded chanson" or "rounded canzona"] is a type of bar form (AAB form or "canzona form") originally taken from medieval German song, but also used to describe musical form in general. The form is represented by either:

ABAB/CB
-or-
AABA

The second part (CB) [German: Abgesang] concludes with most or all of the material (B) from each half (AB) [German: Stollen] of the double first part (ABAB) [German: Aufgesang].

German terms are retained in the discussion of bar form by music scholars because the terms were introduced by Lorenz in his exhaustive investigation of the music of 19th-century composer Richard Wagner.
