= Jean Renart =

Picard writer

Jean Renart, also known as Jean Renaut, was a Picard trouvère from the end of the 12th century and the first half of the 13th to whom three works are firmly ascribed: two metrical chivalric romances, L'Escoufle ("The Kite") and Guillaume de Dole, and a lai, Lai de l’Ombre. Nothing else is known of him or his life. He is praised for his realism and his psychological insight.

Vigneras proposed in 1933 that the dates for Jean Renaut would have to be moved forward: while other scholars dated his activities to between 1195 and 1215, he dated L'Escoufle to after 1245. Guillaume de Dole is "generally regarded as his chef d'oeuvre." It is a longer narrative poem, notable for its incorporation of a large number of shorter lyric poems, including a number of chansons de toile. The date of composition is usually placed early in the thirteenth century.

== Bibliography ==
- "Chanson de toile". Harvard Dictionary of Music. Harvard UP. 2003. p. 161. ISBN 9780674011632.
- Durling, Nancy Vine (1997). "Introduction". In Nancy Vine Durling (ed.). Jean Renart and the art of romance: essays on Guillaume de Dole. UP of Florida. pp. 1–10. ISBN 978-0-8130-1495-1.
- "Renart, Jean". Columbia Encyclopedia, 6th ed. Columbia University Press. 2007.
- Terry, Patricia; Nancy Vine Durling (1993). The Romance of the Rose or Guillaume De Dole. U of Pennsylvania P. ISBN 978-0-8122-1388-1.
- Vigneras, Louis André (1933). "Etudes sur Jean Renart I. Sur la Date du Roman de l'Escoufle". Modern Philology. 30 (3): 241–262. doi:10.1086/388040. JSTOR 434445. S2CID 161886230.
