= Mahieu le Juif =

Mahieu le Juif was an Old French trouvère. His name means "Matthew the Jew" and, if his own songs are to be believed, he was a convert from Judaism to Christianity. Only two of his songs survive, one with a melody. He has been conflated with Mahieu de Gant, but the same manuscript that contains both their works clearly distinguishes them.

Mahieu's song, Par grant franchise (RS 782), was very widely copied and today exists in twelve chansonniers, including one in Occitan. It recounts how the je (the first-person persona, perhaps to be equated with Mahieu himself) converted from Judaism to Christianity for the sake of his lady. Instead of love, however, he is ridiculed by her. The melody shows some variation between sources and there is intertextual similarity between a piece of the troubadour Albertet de Sestaro and Par grant, but the direction of any influence of the one on the other cannot be ascertained: though Jeanroy assumed that the trouvère was influenced by the troubadour.

Mahieu's other piece, Pour autrui movrai (RS 313), likewise refers to his Jewishness, but it was not as widely copied, appearing only in the Chansonnier du Roi (Trouvère chansonnier M) and the Chansonnier de Noailles (Trouvère chansonnier T).
