= Apocalypse of Golias =

12-century satirical Latin poem

Start of the Apocalypse in Bodleian 851

The Apocalypse of Golias (Latin: Apocalypsis Goliae) is a satirical Latin poem of the 12th century, probably written in England or France. Like the Biblical Book of Apocalypse, the poem is addressed to the "Seven Churches", but manuscripts differ as to whether they are the "Seven Churches in England" or "Seven Churches in Neustria".

The Apocalypse of Golias has been ascribed by different scholars to Alan of Lille, Walter of Châtillon, Hugh Primas and Walter Map, but the evidence is against these attributions. The poem is one of a group of about the same date, all connected with the fictional "Bishop Golias", but these poems are not all by the same author.

The poet narrates a vision, a summer dream, in which Pythagoras offers to act as his guide, and gives him a quick view of the scholars and writers of the classical world from Priscian to Hippocrates. An angel then appears to introduce the main theme, a fierce criticism of pope, bishops, priests, archdeacons and deacons, who are successively likened to different animals. Monks are the worst of all, and their greed, gluttony and lust are described in colourful detail.

== Bibliography ==
- Raby, F. J. E. (1934). "The Apocalypse of Golias and other poems". A History of Secular Latin Poetry in the Middle Ages. Vol. 2. Oxford: Clarendon Press. pp. 214–227. ISBN 0-19-814325-7.
- K. Strecker (1928). Die Apocalypse des Golias. Rome, Leipzig.
