= Haverskerque =

Haverskerque Haverskerke
- Commune
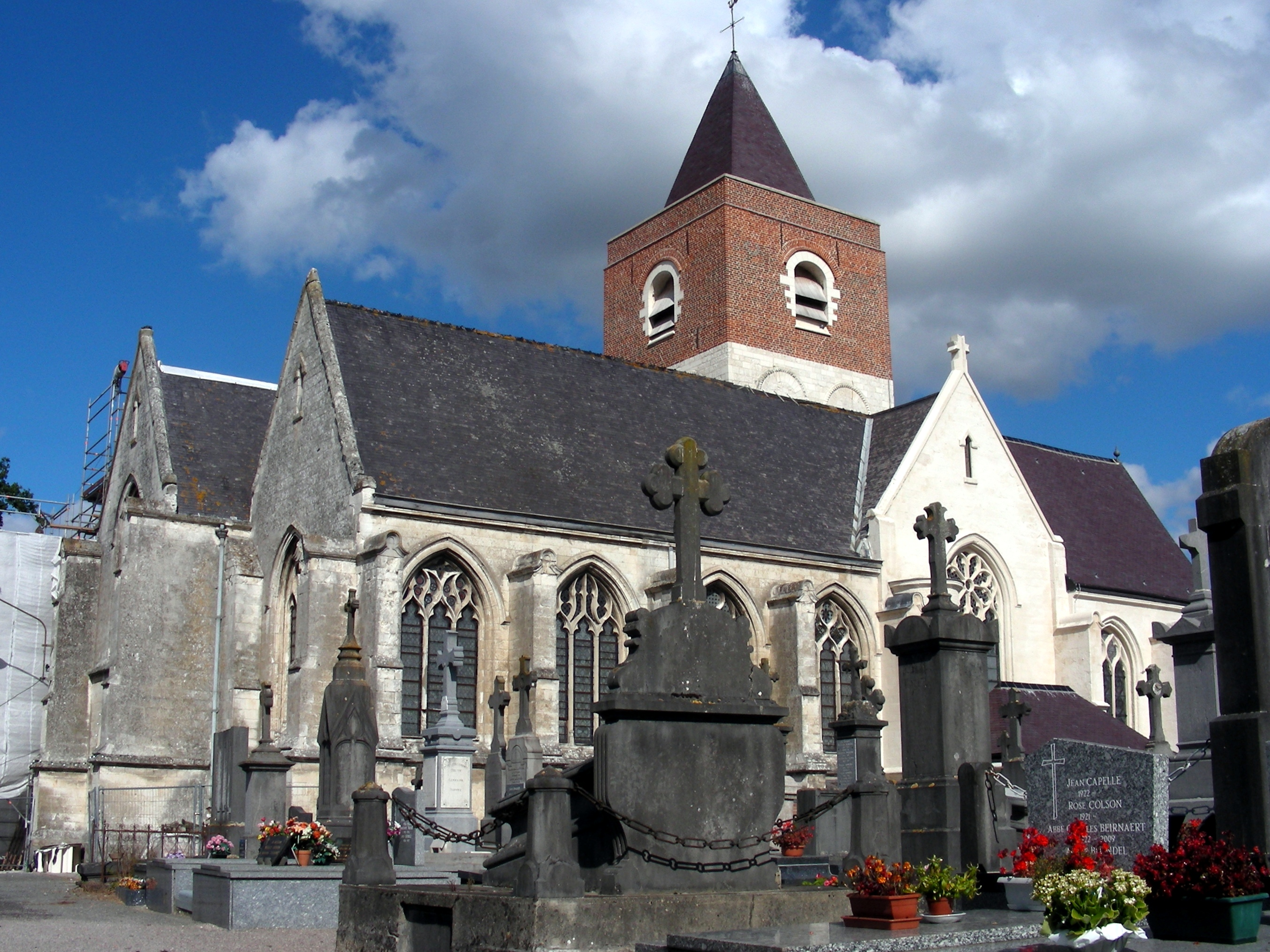
- Haverskerque in the arrondissement of Dunkirk

- Coat of arms
- Location of Haverskerque
- Location within France Location within Hauts-de-France
- Coordinates: 50°38′29″N 2°32′30″E
- Country: France
- Region: Hauts-de-France
- Department: Nord
- Arrondissement: Dunkerque
- Canton: Hazebrouck
- Intercommunality: CC Flandre Lys

Government
  - Mayor (2020–2026): Jocelyne Durut
- Area^{1}: 9.17 km^{2} (3.54 sq mi)
- Elevation: 16 m (52 ft)
- Highest elevation: 19 m (62 ft)
- Lowest elevation: 14 m (46 ft)
- Population (2023): 1,376
  - Density: 150/km^{2} (389/sq mi)
- Demonym: Haverskerquois
- Time zone: UTC+01:00 (CET)
  - Summer (DST): UTC+02:00 (CEST)
- INSEE/Postal code: 59293 /59660
- ^{1} French Land Register data, which excludes lakes, ponds, glaciers > 1 km^{2} (0.386 sq mi or 247 acres) and river estuaries.

Haverskerque (from Flemish; Haverskerke in modern Dutch spelling) is a commune in the Nord department in northern France.

== Heraldry ==
Arms of Haverskerque	The arms of Haverskerque are blazoned : Or, a fess gules. (Condé-sur-l'Escaut and Haverskerque use the same arms.)

== See also ==
- Communes of the Nord department
