= Arthur Dinaux =

French journalist and antiquarian (1795–1864)

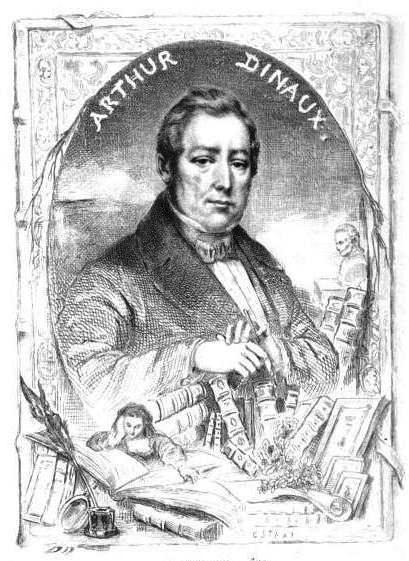
- Born: 8 September 1795; Valenciennes
- Died: 15 May 1864 (aged 68); Montataire
- Occupations: Journalist; Historian; Writer

Arthur Martin Dinaux (8 September 1795 – 15 May 1864) was a French journalist and antiquarian.

Dinaux was born in Valenciennes. In 1822 he proposed excavation at the village of Famars, resulting in the discovery of over 30,000 Roman silver medals.

== Works ==
- Les trouvères cambrésiens, 1836.
- Les trouvères de la Flandre et du Tournaisis, 1839.
- Les trouvères artésiens, 1843.
- Les trouvères : brabançons, hainuyers, liégeois et namurois, 1863.
- Arthur Dinaux by Coedes
  Les sociétés badines, bachiques, littéraires et chantantes, leur histoire et leurs travaux, ed. by Pierre Gustave Brunet, 1867.

== Honors and awards ==
Knight of the Order of Legion of Honour
