= Jehan de Grieviler =

French composer

Jehan and his music in the chansonnier Vatican Reg. lat. 1490

Jehan de Grieviler (fl. mid- to late 13th century) was an Artesian cleric and trouvère.

Jehan was probably born at Grévillers near Arras. A certain "Grieviler" is mentioned in the necrology (registre) of the Confrérie des jongleurs et des bourgeois d'Arras under 1254. Elizabeth Aubrey argues that since Jehan was a known member of the Puy d'Arras, he cannot be identified with the "Grieviler" of the necrology. More recent work on these institutions by Carol Symes has suggested they were in fact the same. Nonetheless, a further piece of evidence for establishing his chronology are the songs he is known to have composed with Adam de la Halle, who was very young in the 1250s. Probably Jehan was one of the sixteen unordained married clerics in minor orders who petitioned the Bishop of Arras on 28 January 1254 to exempt them from secular taxation. They were evidently involved in trade and commerce.

Jehan participated in a total of thirty-four jeux partis, initiating six of the exchanges himself. Twenty-eight of these were with Jehan Bretel. Three of these last have surviving melodies, probably composed by him. He also wrote six chansons courtoises, and a seventh attributed to Jehan de la Fontaine may be by him. He also composed one surviving rotrouenge.

All of his melodies are conventional, save Uns pensers jolis, which is through-composed, and Jolie amours qui m'a en sa baillie, which begins on B and ranges from high to low F.

== List of compositions ==
Chansons

- Amours me fait de cuer joli chanter (attributed Jehan de la Fontaine)
- Entre raison et amour grant tourment
- Jolie amours qui m'a en sa baillie
- Jolis espoirs et amoureus desir
- Pour bone amour et ma dame honorer
- S'amours envoisie
- Uns pensers jolis

Rotrouenges

- Dolans, iriés, plains d'ardure

Jeux partis with music probably by Grieviler

- Cuvelier, un jugement
- Jehan Bretel, une jolie dame
- Jehan Bretel, votre avis

Jeux partis with Jehan Bretel

- Conseilliez moi, Jehan de Grieviler
- Grieviler, a ma requeste, no music
- Grieviler, del quel doit estre
- Grieviler, deus dames sai d'une beauté
- Grieviler, deus dames sont
- Grieviler, dites moi voir, no music
- Grieviler, feme avés prise
- Grieviler, ja en ma vie, no music
- Grieviler, par maintes fies
- Grieviler, par quel raison, no music
- Grieviler, par vo bapteme
- Grieviler, se vous aviés
- Grieviler, se vous quidiés
- Grieviler, s'il avenoit, no music
- Grieviler, un jugement
- Grieviler, vostre ensient, two melodies
- Grieviler, vostre pensee
- Jehan de Grieviler, deus dames sai, no music
- Jehan de Grieviler, sage
- Jehan de Grieviler, s'aveuc celi, no music
- Jehan de Grieviler, une
- Jehan de Grieviler, un jugement, no music
- Prince del Pui, mout bien savés trouver, proposed by Grieviler
- Respondés a ma demande, two melodies
- Sire Bretel, je vous vueill demander, proposed by Grieviler, no music
- Sire Bretel, vous qui d'amours savez, proposed by Grieviler, no music
