= Lambert Ferri =

Lambert Ferri (fl. c. 1250–1300) was a trouvère and cleric at the Benedictine monastery at Saint-Léonard, Pas-de-Calais. By 1268, he was a canon and a deacon of the monastery; he is last associated with the monastery in 1282.

He was a popular partner for jeux partis, of which some twenty-seven survive between him and other composers, including Jehan Bretel, Jehan le Cuvelier d'Arras, Jehan de Grieviler, Jehan de Marli, Phelipot Verdiere, Robert Casnois, and Robert de La Pierre. Eleven of his songs have surviving melodies, including seven of the jeux partis, three chansons, and one Marian serventois.

== Table of extant songs ==
incipit	genre	surviving melody	co-author
Aïmans fins et verais Debonairetes	serventois	yes	
Amours qui m’a du tout en sa baillie	chanson	yes	
J'ai tant d’amours apris et entendu Que desoremais	chanson	yes	
Li tres dous tens ne la saison novele	chanson	yes	
Lambert Ferri, une dame est amee	jeu-parti	no	Jehan Bretel
Lambert Ferri, li qeus doit mieus avoir	jeu-parti	no	Jehan Bretel
Ferri, se ja dieus vous voie	jeu-parti	no	Jehan Bretel
Lambert, il sont doi amant	jeu-parti	no	Jehan Bretel
Lambert, se vous amiés bien loiaument	jeu-parti	no	Jehan Bretel
Ferri, se vous bien amiés	jeu-parti	no	Jehan Bretel
Lambert, une amie avés	jeu-parti	no	Jehan Bretel
Amis Lambert Ferri, vous trouverés	jeu-parti	no	Jehan Bretel
Lambert Ferri, s'une dame orgeilleuse	jeu-parti	no	Jehan Bretel
Lambert Ferri, je vous part	jeu-parti	no	Jehan Bretel
Entendés, Lambert Ferri	jeu-parti	no	Jehan Bretel
Ferri, a vostre ensïent	jeu-parti	no	Jehan Bretel
Lambert Ferri, drois est ke m'entremete	jeu-parti	no	Jehan Bretel
Sire Bretel, entendés	jeu-parti	no	Jehan Bretel
Jehan Bretel, par raison	jeu-parti	yes	Jehan Bretel
Prince del pui, selon vostre pensee	jeu-parti	yes	Jehan Bretel
Sire Bretel, entendés	jeu-parti	yes	Jehan Bretel
Biau(s) Phelipot Verdiere, je vous (or vai) proi	jeu-parti	no	Pilippot Verdiere
Robert del Caisnoi, amis	jeu-parti	no	Robert del Caisnoi
De ce (or cou), Robert de la Piere	jeu-parti	yes	Robert de la Piere
Grieveler, j'ai grant mestier	jeu-parti	yes	Jehan de Grieviler
Jehan, tres bien amerés	jeu-parti	yes	Jehan de Grieviler

== Sources ==
- Parker, Ian R. "Ferri, Lambert." Grove Music Online. Oxford Music Online. Accessed 20 September 2008.
