= Confrérie des jongleurs et bourgeois d'Arras =

The Confrérie des jongleurs et bourgeois d'Arras was a fraternity of jongleurs founded in Arras, France, in or around 1175. As its name implies, it was intended for jongleurs (not just trouvères) and the bourgeoisie, not just the knightly class. It also did not hold poetic contests. In these ways it was distinct from the Puy d'Arras.

== Description ==
The foundation of the Confrérie is enshrined in legend, according to which two debating jongleurs, unable to settle their differences, were approached by the Virgin Mary, who sent them to Arras, which was under the curse of the plague. There they were to adjudicate their dispute before the bishop in the Cathedral of Notre-Dame. Once there, the Virgin again appeared and handed them a candle, the Sainte chandelle of tradition, the melted wax from which, mingled with water, was found to heal the wounds of those afflicted with the plague, 144 that first night. In gratitude and out of praise, the jongleurs founded a confrérie to safeguard the candle and celebrate the religious feasts. Shortly thereafter, and quite historically, a tower was built to house the candle, which generated a sizeable profit from pilgrims.

The Confrérie was, at the beginning, a lay religious institute. Its statutes provided for last rites, funeral services for deceased members, and a common supply of food for poorer members. Open to both men and women, it functioned through membership fees and annual dues. Members had also to swear an oath, after which they could participate in the election of the head confrére and his officers, who monitored members' activities to ensure compliance with the statutes.

The most important document for the history of the Confrérie is the necrology that records the deaths of members from 1194 to 1361. Adam de la Halle and Jehan Erart were members.
