= Le Chastelain de Couci =

French trouvère of the 12th century

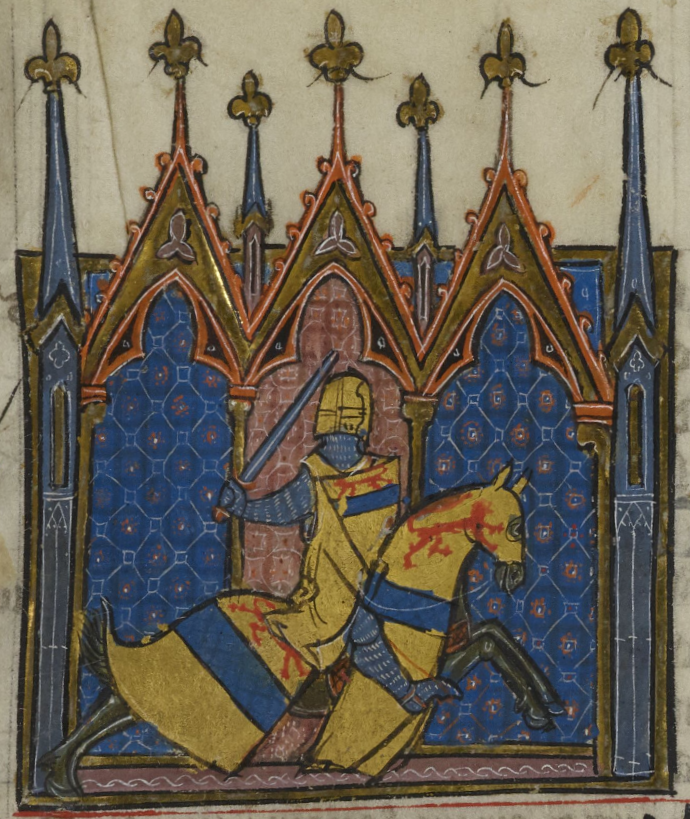
The Chastelain in the Chansonnier d'Arras

Le Chastelain de Couci (modern orthography Le Châtelain de Coucy) was a French trouvère of the 12th century. He may have been the Guy de Couci who was castellan of Château de Coucy from 1186 to 1203. Guy de Couci fought in the third and fourth Crusades.

Some twenty-six songs, written in langue d'oïl are attributed to him, and about fifteen or sixteen are considered authentic. They are modelled very closely on Provençal originals, but are saved from the category of mere imitations by a grace and simplicity peculiar to the author. Many are in bar form and the Châtelain favored the Natureingang. The legend of the love of the Châtelain de Coucy and the Lady of Fayel, in which there figures a jealous husband who makes his wife eat the heart of her lover, has no historical basis, and dates from a late 13th century romance by Jakemon Sakesep.

The story, which seems to be Breton in origin, has been also told of a Provençal troubadour, Guilhem de Cabestaing, and of the minnesinger Reinmar von Brennenberg. Pierre de Belloy, who wrote some account of the family of Couci, made the story the subject of his tragedy Gabrielle de Vergy.
