= Gerbert de Montreuil =

French poet

Gerbert de Montreuil was a 13th-century French poet from the north of France.

He wrote Le Roman de la violette or Gérard de Nevers, one of the most outstanding medieval poems, famous for its vivid narrative and faithful depiction of contemporary customs. The poem underwent countless adaptations and imitations. It tells the trials of the unfortunate and innocent Euriaut, who becomes an object of public dispute between Gérard de Nevers and Lisiard de Forez, the former taking her defense while the other suggests she is guilty of misconduct by claiming he knows of a violet-shaped mark on her bosom. The story percolated into Shakespeare's Cymbeline via Giovanni Boccaccio, and into Carl Maria von Weber's opera Euryanthe.

Gerbert is possibly the author of "Gerbert's Continuation", one of the Four Continuations of Chrétien de Troyes' Perceval, the Story of the Grail.
