= Adam de la Halle =

French trouvère (1245–50 – 1285–88/after 1306)

Adam de la Halle in the 1278 Chansonnier d'Arras (manuscript 657 in the library of Arras)

Adam de la Halle (1245–50 – 1285–8/after 1306) was a French poet-composer trouvère. Among the few medieval composers to write both monophonic and polyphonic music, in this respect he has been considered both a conservative and progressive composer, resulting in a complex legacy: he cultivated admired representatives of older trouvère genres, but also experimented with newer dramatic works. Adam represented the final generation of the trouvère tradition and "has long been regarded as one of the most important musical and literary figures of thirteenth-century Europe".

Adam's literary and musical works include chansons and jeux-partis (poetic debates) in the style of the trouvères; polyphonic rondel and motets in the style of early liturgical polyphony; and a musical play, Jeu de Robin et Marion (c. 1282–83), which is considered the earliest surviving secular French play with music. He was a member of the Confrérie des jongleurs et bourgeois d'Arras, a fraternity of jongleurs.

== Life and career ==
Adam's other nicknames, "le Bossu d'Arras" and "Adam d'Arras", suggest that he came from Arras, France. The sobriquet "the Hunchback" was probably a family name; Adam himself points out that he was not one. His father, Henri de la Halle, was a well-known Citizen of Arras, and Adam studied grammar, theology, and music at the Cistercian abbey of Vaucelles, near Cambrai. The father and son had their share in the civil discords in Arras, and for a short time took refuge in Douai. Adam had been destined for the church, but renounced this intention, and married a certain Marie, who features in many of his songs, rondeaux, motets and jeux-partis. Afterwards he joined the household of Robert II, Count of Artois; and then was attached to Charles of Anjou, brother of Louis IX, whose fortunes he followed in Egypt, Syria, Palestine, and Italy.

At the court of Charles, after Charles became king of Naples, Adam wrote his Jeu de Robin et Marion, the most famous of his works.

== Works ==
His known works include thirty-six chansons (literally, "songs"), forty-six rondets de carole, eighteen jeux-partis, fourteen rondeaux, five motets, one rondeau-virelai, one ballette, one dit d'amour, and one congé.

Adam's shorter pieces are accompanied by music, of which a transcript in modern notation, with the original score, is given in Edmond de Coussemaker's edition. His Jeu de Robin et Marion is cited as the earliest French play with music on a secular subject. The pastoral, which tells how Marion resisted the knight, and remained faithful to Robert the shepherd, is based on an old chanson, Robin m'aime, Robin m'a. It consists of dialogue varied by refrains already current in popular song. The melodies to which these are set have the character of folk music, and are more spontaneous and melodious than the more elaborate music of his songs and motets. Fétis considered Le Jeu de Robin et Marion and Le Jeu de la feuillée forerunners of the comic opera. An adaptation of Le Jeu Robin et Marion, by Julien Tiersot, was played at Arras by a company from the Paris Opéra-Comique on the occasion of a festival in 1896 in honour of Adam de le Hale.

His other play, Le jeu Adan or Le jeu de la Feuillee (ca. 1262), is a satirical drama in which he introduces himself, his father and the citizens of Arras with their peculiarities. His works include a congé, or satirical farewell to the city of Arras, and an unfinished chanson de geste in honour of Charles of Anjou, Le roi de Secile, begun in 1282; another short piece, Le jeu du pelerin, is sometimes attributed to him.

=== Editions ===
- article by Paulin Paris in: Histoire litteraire de La France (vol. xx. pp. 638–675)
- The edition of Adam's two jeux in: Monmerqué and Michel's Theatre francais au moyen age (1842)
- Oeuvres completes (1872), edited by E. de Coussemaker.
- Ernest Langlois, Le jeu de Robin et Marion (1896), with a translation in modern French
- A Guesnon, La Satire a Arras au XIIIe, siecle (1900)
- Canchons et Partures des... Adan delle Hale, a critical edition by Rudolf Berger,(Halle, 1900)
- Nigel Wilkins, The Lyric Works of Adam de la Halle, ed., Corpus Musicae, Vol.44, American Institute of Musicology, 1967.
- Recent French ed. of complete works: edited by Pierre-Yves Badel (Paris: Livre de poche, 1995) (ISBN 2-253-06656-7)

== Recordings ==
- 1955 – Adam de La Halle. Le jeu de Robin et de Marion; 13 rondeaux (Raimbaut de Vaqueiras, Guillaume d'Amiens, Anon.). Pro Musica Antiqua, Brussels, Safford Cape, conductor. Recorded 23 June 1953, in the Palais des Academies, Brussels. Archiv Produktion II. Research Period: The Central Middle Ages. Series A: Troubadours, Trouvères and Minnesingers; Series B: Music of the Minstrels; Series C: Early Polyphony before 1300. LP recording, 1 disc: analog, monaural, 33 1/3 rpm, 12 in. [Germany]: Archiv Produktion.
- 1991 – Adam de La Halle. Le jeu de Robin et Marion. Ensemble Perceval, Guy Robert, director. Recorded 1980. CD recording, 1 disc: digital, stereo, 4 3/4 in. Arion ARN 68162. France: Arion.
- 1991 – Adam de La Halle. Le jeu de Robin et Marion. Schola Cantorum Basiliensis, Thomas Binkley, cond. Recorded May 1987 at the Barfüsserkirche in Basel, Switzerland. CD recording, 1 disc: digital, stereo, 4 3/4 in. Focus 913. [Bloomington, Ind.]: Focus.
- 1998 – "Robin Loves Me" arranged for solo guitar (and performed by) Gareth Koch as the final track of his "Carmina Burana" CD released by ABC Classics in 2006.
- 2004 – Zodiac. Ars Nova and Ars Subtilior in the Low Countries and Europe Capilla Flamenca. Eufoda 1360.
- 2006 – Adam de La Halle. D'amoureus cuer voel chanter, Anne Delafosse-Quentin, Les Jardins de Courtoisie, Zig Zag Territoires (ZZT070401)
- 2019 – Noel Akchoté. Adam de La Halle – Le Doux Regard de ma Dame. Self published.
