= Puy d'Arras =

The Puy d'Arras, called in its own day the Puy Notre-Dame, was a medieval poetical society formed in Arras for holding contests between trouvères and pour maintenir amour et joie (for maintaining love and joy, i.e. the courtly love lyric). The term puy is Old French for "place of eminence", from Latin podium. The president of the Puy, elected annually, was titled the Prince du Puy, and he presided over the competitions, which were decided by panels of judges. The Puy was under the nominal patronage of the Virgin Mary, referred to as "Notre Dame du Puy d'Arras". Other puys under her patronage were founded at Amiens, Boulogne-sur-Mer, Caen, Évreux, and Rouen.

The Puy is less well-documented than the contemporary Confrérie des jongleurs et bourgeois d'Arras, and there is disagreement over whether they were one and the same society. The statutes of the Puy d'Arras do not survive, only the later ones of the Puy d'Amiens from 1471 shed any light on the nature of the laws of the puys. The Puy d'Arras was, unlike the Confrérie, neither social nor religious in conception. It was the creation of the urban patriciate, the wealthy and noble, plus some others, possibly those excluded from the Confrérie, who determined to maintain the courtly tradition. The Puy was thus more conservative than the Confrérie.

The poets Andrieu Contredit d'Arras and Jean de Renti (criticisingly) make mention of it and its contests. Jean Bretel mentions it in his works and he is recorded elsewhere as having served a term as Prince. Undoubtedly the highest personage to attend the Puy's festivals was Theobald I of Navarre. The high standing of the Puy is evidenced in the thirteenth-century poem Dit artésien.

By the nature of its activities, one of the favoured verse forms of the Puy was the jeu parti. Women could also participate in the Puy, both as contestants, audience members, and as judges. It has been suggested that the chansonnier known as trouvère manuscript R was compiled from oral performance at the Puy d'Arras.
