= Bar form =

Musical pattern from the 15th century

Bar form (German: die Barform or der Bar) is a musical form of the pattern AAB.

== Original use ==
The term comes from the rigorous terminology of the Meistersinger guilds of the 15th to 18th century who used it to refer to their songs and the songs of their predecessors, the minnesingers of the 12th to 14th century. In their work, a Bar is not a single stanza (which they called a Liet or Gesätz); rather, it is the whole song. The word Bar is most likely a shortening of Barat, denoting a skillful thrust in fencing. The term was used to refer to a particularly artful song – the type one composes in songwriters' guilds.

The AAB pattern does, however, describe each stanza in a Meistersinger's Bar, which is divided into two Stollen (A), which are collectively termed the Aufgesang, followed by an Abgesang. The musical form thus contains two repetitions of one melody (Stollen – 'stanzas') followed by a different melody (Abgesang – 'aftersong'). One such tune (Ton in Meistersinger terminology) by Hans Folz (c1437–1513) illustrates this:

Note that the B section is not necessarily the same length as each A section. The B section can also incorporate parts of the A section's phrase: in the above example, the final 14 notes of the B section match the final 14 notes of each A section (see also Rundkanzone). In this example, the 17 never-repeated notes starting the B section would have been called a Steg by the Meistersingers: literally, "bridge"; whence comes the term for a contrasting section in popular music.

== Modern use ==
Composer Richard Wagner in act III of his opera Die Meistersinger von Nürnberg, used the word Bar incorrectly as referring to a stanza of the prize song. This was based on his misreading of Wagenseil. Bach's famous biographer Spitta in his monumental 1873–1880 biography, emphasized the role of Lutheran chorales, almost all of which are in AAB form, in what he considered the most mature of Bach's cantatas. Composer Johannes Brahms claimed the AAB form of the chorale "Jesu, meine Freude" generates larger formal structures in Bach's motet of the same name. Subsequent popularity and study of the use of AAB stanzas in Bach's and Wagner's works has led to wide adoption of the term Bar form for any song or larger musical form that can be rationalized to a three part AAB form with the first part repeating.

Such AAB forms may be found in works ranging from Lutheran chorales to "The Star-Spangled Banner" to songs by Schubert, Schumann, and Brahms. Bartók made use of the Bar form in the 20th century, and most blues follow the pattern "A_{1}A_{2}B."

The German musicologist Alfred Lorenz, in his studies of Wagner, abstracted the concept of barform to include anything resembling an AAB structure at any level of scale:

"The essence of the Bar does not reside in the actual length, but in the distribution of its powers. Whether the Bar occupies 3 measures or 1,000 is irrelevant; it is always a regular Bar if [its] essence is fulfilled: a double appearance as against a single balancing occurrence of equal weight."

Lorenz argues that this short-short-long structuring principle occurring at multiple scales at once gives Wagner's music its feeling of ever-present forward momentum.

== See also ==
- Ode, traditionally in AAB form (strophe, antistrophe, epode)
- Ternary form (ABA)
