= Jeu-parti =

Genre of medieval French poetry

A jeu-parti with music and an illustration in the 13th-century Chansonnier d'Arras

The jeu-parti (plural jeux-partis, also known as parture) is a genre of French lyric poetry composed between two trouvères. It is a cognate of the Occitan partimen (also known as partia or joc partit). In the classic type, one poet poses a dilemma question in the opening stanza, his or her partner picks a side (the 'part') in the second stanza, which replicates the versification of the first and is sung to the same melody. Typically, the jeu-parti has six stanzas, with the two interlocutors alternating stanza by stanza. Many jeux-partis also have final partial stanzas in which one or both of the interlocutors appoint judges and call for judgement. The outcome, however, is virtually never given within the jeu-parti itself and would have been the subject of audience discussion after the jeu-parti's performance. The form was particularly associated with the Puy d'Arras. Over 200 examples survive, of which around 180 are in the classic form.

== Chief exponents ==
Jeu-parti composers fall into different regional and historical groups. Early examples of the genre were composed by aristocratic trouvères such as Thibaut de Champagne, Raoul de Soissons, Gace Brulé and John I of Brittany. Many jeux-partis were composed by poets from Arras, who were from a range of social backgrounds, notably Jehan Bretel, Jehan de Grieviler, Lambert Ferri, Gillebert de Berneville, the brothers Guillaume and Gilles le Vinier, and Adam de la Halle. The genre also flourished in Lorraine, with surviving examples by Thibaut II of Bar and Roland of Reims. Judges of jeux-partis range in social class from high-born aristocrats, such as Edward I of England and Charles I of Anjou, to merchants, clerics, and mysterious figures named only by a nickname. Although most jeux-partis were composed by men, some feature a female interlocutor (one, attributed spuriously, to Blanche of Castile) or a female judge. Aristocratic female judges include the sisters Jeanne and Mahaut d'Aspremont (respectively the Countess of Leiningen and the Dame de Commercy), Jeanne de Fouencamp, who may have been associated with the Puy d'Arras, and Demisele Oede, also associated with the Puy, who was the wife of a wealthy Artesian financier and appears as the judge of five jeux-partis. Their involvement speaks to the importance of women as active, critical audiences of this genre.

== Topics of the jeux-partis ==
Most jeux-partis are about love, but are not restricted to the high-register discussion of love found in grand chant. Some songs debate the different ways to win a lady with whom the poet has not yet had sexual union; other poems discuss which scenarios are preferable for sexual congress. Jeu-parti composers made great use of proverbs and metaphors in their poetry. These often relate to medieval life in the court or the city, referring to hunting, money or the market place. Many jeux-partis share their dilemma question with demandes d'amour, short dilemma questions (normally followed by a yes or no answer) that are found in manuscripts from the early fourteenth century. Although manuscripts containing demandes postdate jeux-partis, it is possible that many demandes existed before jeux-partis and were formalised and elaborated musically by jeu-parti composers.

== Bibliography ==
- Alfred Jeanroy, Les origines de la poésie lyrique en France au Moyen-Age (Paris, 1899, 3/1925)
- Alfred Jeanroy: La poésie lyrique des troubadours (Toulouse and Paris, 1934/R), ii, 247–81
- A. Långfors, A. Jeanroy and L. Brandin, eds.: Recueil général des jeux-partis français (Paris, 1926)
- J. H. Maillard and J. Chailley: Anthologie de chants de trouvères (Paris, 1967)
- M. F. Stewart: 'The Melodic Structure of Thirteenth-Century "Jeux-partis,"' AcM, li (1979), 86–107
- S. N. Rosenberg: 'Jeu-parti,’ Medieval France: an Encyclopedia (New York, 1995), 495.
- Michèle Gally, Parler d'amour au puy d'Arras: Lyrique en jeu (Orléans, 2004).
