= Grand chant =

The grand chant (courtois) or, in modern French, (grande) chanson courtoise or chanson d'amour, was a genre of Old French lyric poetry devised by the trouvères. It was adopted from the Occitan canso of the troubadours, but scholars stress that it was a distinct genre. The predominant theme of the grand chant was courtly love, but topics were more broad than in the canso, especially after the thirteenth century. The monophonic grand chant of the High Middle Ages (12th–13th centuries) was in many respects the predecessor of the polyphonic chanson of the Late Middle Ages (14th–15th centuries).

== Reference works ==
- O'Neill, Mary (2006). Courtly Love Songs of Medieval France: Transmission and Style in the Trouvère Repertoire. Oxford: Oxford University Press. ISBN 0-19-816547-1.
