= Mohammedan =

Formerly common term referring to Muslims and to Islam

Mohammedan (Note: Also spelt as Muhammadan, Mahommedan, Mahomedan or Mahometan.) was a historical early modern term used to denote a follower of Muhammad, the Islamic prophet. It is used as both a noun and an adjective, meaning belonging or relating to, either Muhammad or the religion, doctrines, institutions and practices that he established. The word was formerly common in usage, but the terms Muslim and Islamic are more common today. Though sometimes used stylistically by some Muslims, a vast majority consider the term as archaic and a misnomer or even offensive, as it seems to them to suggest that Muslims worship Muhammad himself instead of God.

== Etymology ==
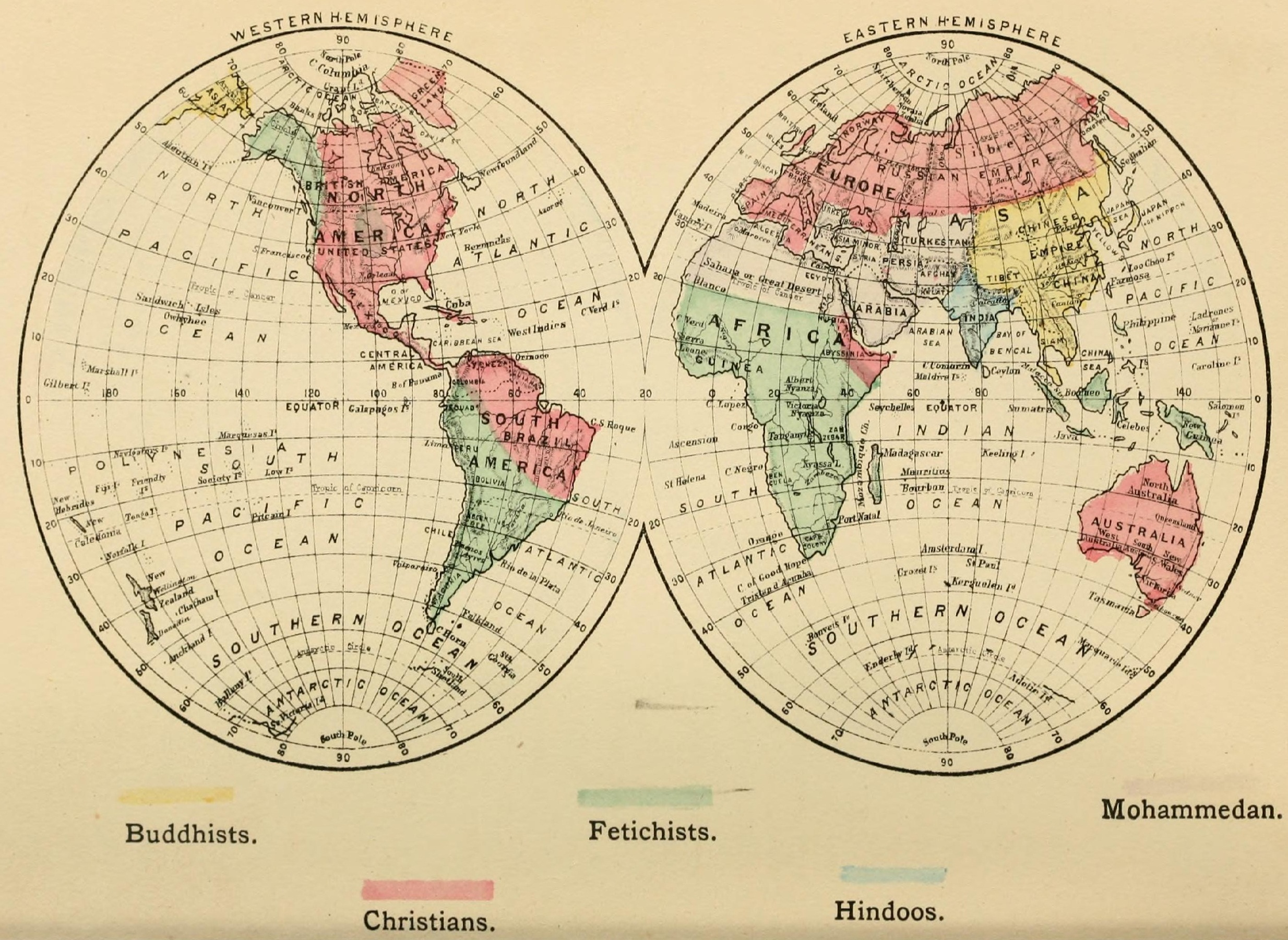
1883 map of world religions showing "Mohammedan" areas in grey.

The Oxford English Dictionary cites 1663 as the first recorded usage of the English term; the older spelling Mahometan dates back to at least 1529. The English word is derived from Neo-Latin Mahometanus, from Medieval Latin Mahometus, Muhammad. It meant simply a follower of Mohammad.

In Western Europe, down to the 13th century or so, some Christians had the belief that Muhammad had either been a heretical Christian or that he was a god worshipped by Muslims. Some works of medieval European literature referred to Muslims as "pagans" or by sobriquets such as the "paynim foe" (enemy). Depictions, such as those in the Song of Roland, show Muslims praying to a variety of "idols", including Apollyon, Lucifer, Termagant, and Mahound. During the trials of the Knights Templar (1300–1310s), reference was often made to their worship of the demon Baphomet; this is similar to "Mahomet", the Latin transliteration of Muhammad's name, and Latin was, for another 500 years, the language of scholarship and erudition for most of Europe.

These and other variations on the theme were all set in the "temper of the times" of the Muslim–Christian conflict, as medieval Europe was becoming aware of its great enemy in the wake of the rapid success of the Muslims through a series of conquests shortly after the fall of the Western Roman Empire, as well as the lack of real information in the West of the mysterious East.

== Obsolescence ==
The term has been largely superseded by Muslim (formerly transliterated as Moslem) or Islamic. Mohammedan was commonly used in European literature until at least the mid-1960s. Muslim is more commonly used today, and the term Mohammedan is widely considered archaic or in some cases even offensive.

The term remains in limited use. The Government Muhammadan Anglo Oriental College in Lahore, Pakistan, retains its original name, while the similarly named "Muhammadan Anglo-Oriental College" in Aligarh, India, was renamed and succeeded by the Aligarh Muslim University in 1920, and "Mohammedan Literary Society" in Calcutta, India, was renamed and succeeded by the Muslim Institute of Calcutta in 1930. There are also a number of sporting clubs in Bangladesh and India which include the word, such as Mohammedan Sporting Club (Dhaka), Mohammedan Sporting Club (Chittagong), Mohammedan Sporting Club (Jhenaidah) and Mohammedan S.C. (Kolkata).

== Muslim objections ==
Some modern Muslims have objected to the term, saying it was not used by Muhammad himself or his early followers, and that the religion teaches the worship of God alone (see shirk and tawhid) and not Muhammad or any other of God's prophets. Thus modern Muslims believe "Mohammedan" is a misnomer, "which seem[s] to them to carry the implication of worship of Mohammed, as Christian and Christianity imply the worship of Christ." Also, the term al-Muḥammadīya (the Arabic equivalent of Mohammedan) has been used in Islam to denote several sects considered heretical.

== See also ==
- Christianity and Islam
- Moors
- Muhammad in Islam
- Orientalism
- Saracen
