= Neidert =

Neidert is a surname of German origin, being a shortened form of the surname Neidhardt. Notable people with the surname include:

- John Neidert (born 1946), American former football linebacker
- Nick Neidert (born 1996), American professional baseball pitcher

== See also ==
- Neidhardt
- Neidhart
