= Austorc d'Aorlhac =

Austorc d'Aorlhac or Aurilhac (fl. 1250) was an Auvergnat troubadour from whom only one sirvente survives. He was from Aurillac.

Austorc's only piece, "Ai! Dieus! Per qu'as facha tan gran maleza", was composed after the defeat in 1250 of the Seventh Crusade under Louis IX of France. It was Hermann Schindler who first proposed that the piece referred to the Crusade of 1250 and not that of 1270, on which Louis died. Whatever the Crusade, Kurt Lewent, whose dissertation was the first major study of Occitan Crusading songs, believed that Austorc was a combatant in it. Austorc was surprised that God would allow the Crusade's defeat, but not surprised that Christians would therefore convert to Islam. An excerpt goes like this:

| Crestiantat vey del tot a mal meza, tan gran perda no cug qu'ancmais fezes; per qu'es razos qu'hom hueymais Dieu descreza e qu'azorem Bafomet, lai on es, Tervagan e sa companhia, pus Dieus vol e sancta Maria que nos siam vencut a non dever, e·ls mescrezens fai honratz remaner. | I see that Christianity has been badly hit; I do not believe that we have suffered such a great loss (as this). And it is therefore reasonable that we from now on abandon our belief in God and (instead) worship Mohammed there where he is, and Tervagan as well and his companions, since God and Saint Mary desire that we be conquered unjustly and the infidels have all the honor. |

Five stanzas in length, the sirventes stands incomplete: the first and last stanza contain lacunae and the final words of the tornada are lost. It is a contrafactum of a canso by Peirol, "M'entencio ai tot'en un vers mesa." Only a few years earlier another sirventes and Crusade song, "Ir'e dolors s'es dins mon cor asseza", by Ricaut Bonomel had been composed as a contrafactum of Peirol's canso.

There was an Austorc d'Ornac who served as a consul at Montpellier in 1252.
