= Chevalier, mult estes guariz =

Old French crusade song (c. 1146)

Chevalier, mult estes guariz is an anonymous Old French crusade song written between April 1146 and June 1147. The title (in fact, the incipit) translated "Knights, you are under sure protection". The song predates the chansonnier works of the trouvères. The author of the song is not known. He encourages knights to join King Louis VII to fight in the Second Crusade. He was probably a layman and his intended audience the knightly and noble classes.

The song is preserved in a single manuscript, Universitätsbibliothek Erfurt, Dep. Erf., CA 8° 32, copied in England in the later 12th century.

The poet compares the crusade to a tournament arranged by God at Edessa:

Deus ad un turnei pris
entre Enfern e Pareïs,
si mande trestuz ses amis
ki lui volent guarantor
qu'il ne li seient failliz.
Le Filz Deus al Creatur
a Rohais estre ad mis un jorn.
La serunt salf li pecceür!

God has organised a tourney
between Heaven and Hell,
and so He is asking all His friends
who are willing to support His cause
not to fail Him.
For the son of God the Creator
has fixed a day for being at Edessa;
there shall the sinners be saved!

== Recordings ==
- David Munroe & the Early Music Consort of London, Music of the crusades (1971)
- Oliphant, Songs of the Crusades (2000)
- Richard Searles, Jongleurs Dance (2006)
- Jordi Savall & Monserrat Figueras, Jerusalem (2009)
- Toronto Consort, The Way of the Pilgrim (2016)
