= Unison =

Musical parts sounding at the same pitch

A perfect unison between two Cs

In music, unison is two or more musical parts that sound either the same pitch or pitches separated by intervals of one or more octaves, usually at the same time. Rhythmic unison is another term for homorhythm.

== Definition ==
unison
- Inverse: octave

Name
- Other names: perfect unison, prime, perfect prime
- Abbreviation: P1

Size
- Semitones: 0
- Interval class: 0
- Just interval: 1:1

Cents
- Equal temperament: 0
- Just intonation: 0

Two pitches that are the same or two that move as one.

Unison or perfect unison (also called a prime, or perfect prime) may refer to the (pseudo-) interval formed by a tone and its duplication (in German, Unisono, Einklang, or Prime), for example C–C, as differentiated from the second, C–D, etc. In the unison the two pitches have the ratio of 1:1 or 0 half steps and zero cents. Although two tones in unison are considered to be the same pitch, they are still perceivable as coming from separate sources, whether played on instruments of a different type:; or of the same type:. This is because a pair of tones in unison come from different locations or can have different "colors" (timbres), i.e. come from different musical instruments or human voices. Voices with different colors have, as sound waves, different waveforms. These waveforms have the same fundamental frequency but differ in the amplitudes of their higher harmonics. The unison is considered the most consonant interval while the near unison is considered the most dissonant. The unison is also the easiest interval to tune. The unison is abbreviated as "P1".

However, the unison was questioned by Zarlino as an interval for lacking contrast and compared to a point in geometry:

Equality is never found in consonances or intervals, and the unison is to the musician what the point is to the geometer. A point is the beginning of a line, although, it is not itself a line. But a line is not composed of points, since a point has no length, width, or depth that can be extended, or joined to another point. So a unison is only the beginning of consonance or interval; it is neither consonance nor interval, for like the point it is incapable of extension.

== Performance ensembles ==
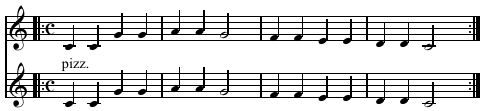
"Twinkle, Twinkle, Little Star" melody doubled in unison. clarinet & pizz. violin

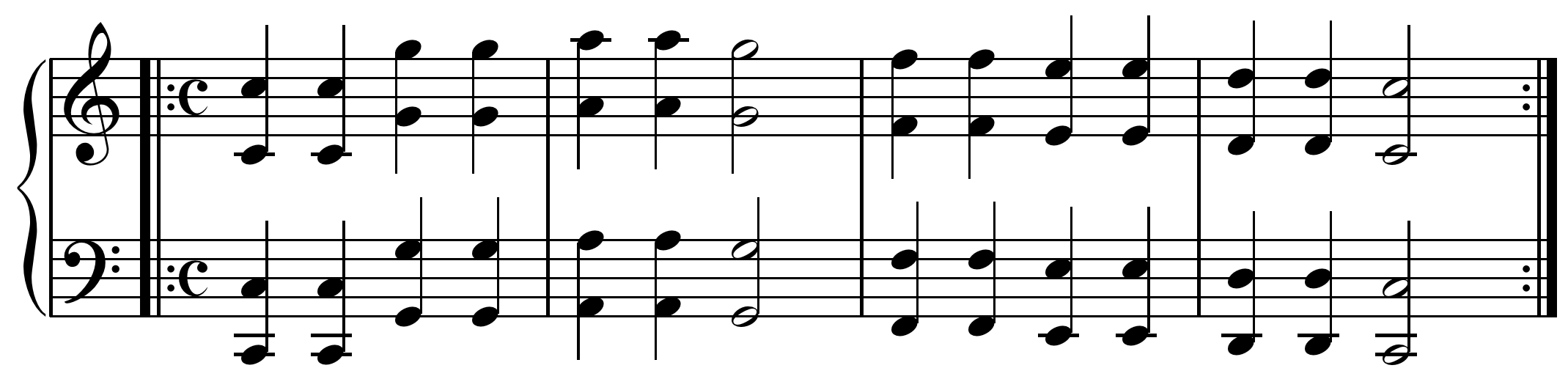
"Twinkle, Twinkle, Little Star" melody doubled in four octaves. piano

In orchestral music unison can mean the simultaneous playing of a note (or a series of notes constituting a melody) by different instruments, either at the same pitch; or in a different octave, for example, cello and double bass (all'unisono). Typically a section string player plays unison with the rest of the section. Occasionally the Italian word divisi (meaning divided, abbrev. div.) marks a point where an instrumental section, typically the first violins, is to be divided into two groups for rendering passages that might, for example, include full chords. Thus, in the divisi first violins the "outside" players (nearer the audience) might play the top note of the chord, while the "inside" seated players play the middle note, and the second violins play the bottom note. At the point where the first violins no longer play divisi, the score may indicate this with unison (abbrev. unis.).

When an entire choir sings the main melody, the choir usually sings in unison. Music in which all the notes sung are in unison is called monophonic. In a choir with two or more sections, such as for different vocal ranges, each section typically sings in unison. Part singing is when two or more voices sing different notes. Homophony is when choir members sing different pitches but with the same rhythm. Polyphony is when the chorus sings multiple independent melodies.

== See also ==
- List of musical intervals
- List of pitch intervals
