= Peirol =

French troubadour

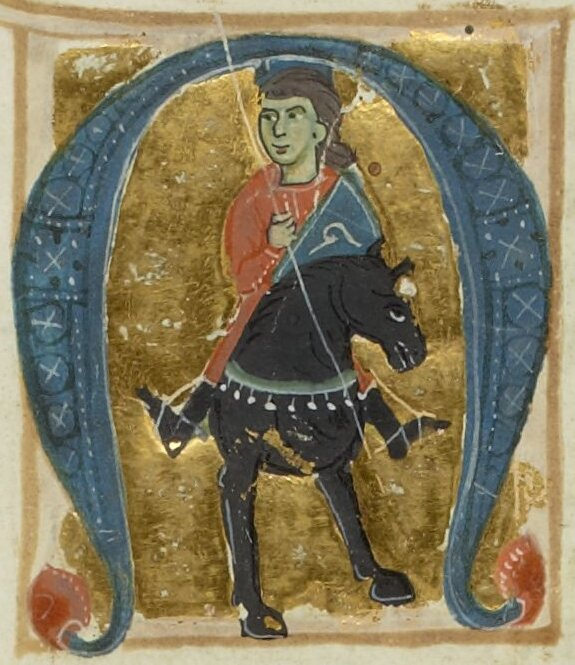
Peirol, from a 13th-century chansonnier

Peirol or Peiròl (French: [peʁɔl], Occitan: [pejˈɾɔl]; born c. 1160, fl. 1188–1222/1225, died in the 1220s) was an Auvergnat troubadour who wrote mostly cansos of courtly love in the late twelfth and early thirteenth centuries. Thirty-four surviving poems written in Occitan have been attributed to him; of these, seventeen (sixteen of them love songs) have surviving melodies. He is sometimes called Peirol d'Auvergne or Peiròl d'Auvèrnha, and erroneously Pierol.

== Biography ==
Not much is known of his life, and any attempt to establish his biography from a reading of his poems is soundly rejected by the most recent scholarship.

Peirol's birth is commonly estimated around 1160. He may have hailed from — and been named after — the village of Pérols in Prondines, Puy-de-Dôme, "at the foot of" (al pe de) the castle of Rochefort-Montagne (Rocafort). Another candidate for his birth town is Pérol in modern Riom-es-Montagnes. His homeland was thus en la contrada del Dalfin: in the county of the Dauphin of Auvergne.

Peirol was originally a poor knight, described as "courtly and handsome" by the author of his late thirteenth-century vida (biography). He served at the court of Dalfi d'Alvernha, but was in love with his sister Salh (or Sail) de Claustra (which means "fled from the cloister"), the wife of Béraut III de Mercœur, and wrote many songs for this "domna" (lady). While Dalfi had brought his sister to his court for Peirol and had helped Peirol cater to her tastes in his compositions, eventually Dalfi grew jealous of the attention his sister gave Peirol and, in part because of the impropriety, had to dismiss Peirol, who could not support himself as a man-at-arms. His biographer indicates, Peirols no se poc mantener per cavallier e venc joglars, et anet per cortz e receup dels barons e draps e deniers e cavals. That is: Peirol being unable to maintain himself as a knight became a jongleur, and travelled from court to court, receiving from barons clothing, money, and horses.

Peirol is known to have been a fiddler and singer from a reference in a tornada of Albertet de Sestaro. After returning from a pilgrimage to Jerusalem sometime in or after 1222, Peirol may have died in Montpellier in the 1220s.

== Courtly love ==
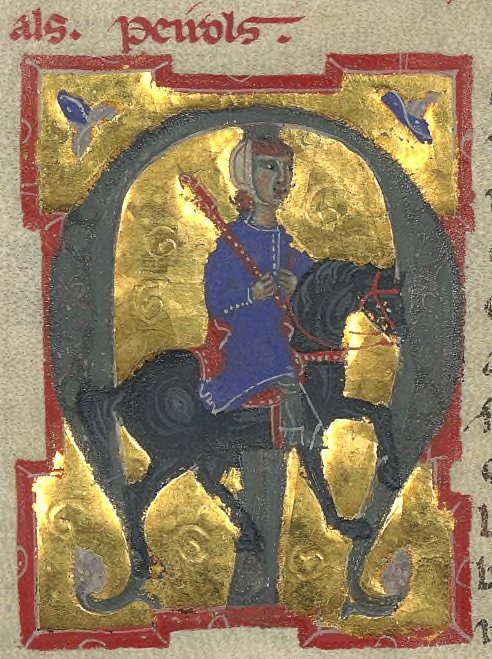
A picture of Peirol illustrates his vida in a 13th-century chansonnier

Peirol's works are simple and metaphysical; based on familiar concepts of courtliness, they lack originality. They are most characteristic in their abstractness and lack of concrete nouns; the adjectives are rarely sensory (related to sight, touch, etc.) and there are no extended references to nature as found in many troubadours. The purpose behind his writing was probably economical and chivalric — for reputation, prestige, and honour — rather than emotional or sentimental; his writing is intellectual and formulaic. Among the personal statements in his works, he expresses a preference for the vers over the chansoneta. Among his love songs can be distinguished the light-hearted "gay songs", which sometimes at least had equally gay melodies, and the more "serious songs", which were "theoretical discussions of love". He wrote in the trobar leu (light poetry) tradition.

To Peirol, the "crafty lover" can "circumvent the foolish watchfulness of the jealous husband." Peirol gave up a nobler woman for a lesser "that I love in joy and peace and am loved in return." Peirol also waded into the discussion concerning whether it was permissible to love in a pure, elevated form at the same time as one sought low, physical love.

One of Peirol's works, "Mainta gens mi malrazona", survives with a melody to which a piano accompaniment was written as "Manta gens me mal razona" by E. Bohm. Among his surviving melodies, Théodore Gérold has ascertained a discord between music and lyric, and although Switten denies this, she admits that they are generally melancholic and not expressive of the mood of the lyrics (if one is conveyed). Both agree, however, that his melodies are simpler than those of contemporary troubadours Folquet de Marselha and Peire Vidal. They are usually written in either the Dorian or Mixolydian modes and "cannot be rejected as tiresome pedantries [...] yet possessed of an intrinsic harmony, a singularity of purpose, a unanimity of conception and intent that may properly be termed artistic."

A trouvère, Guiot de Dijon, writing in Old French, probably modelled his song Chanter m'estuet, coment que me destraigne after Peirol's love song Si be.m sui loing et entre gent estraigna.

Peirol also tried his hand at the art of the sirventes with the "Ren no val hom joves que no.s perjura", which was widely copied. This poem, which has stark and vivid imagery and even a prosaic reference to merchants, is so unusual for Peirol that its authenticity has been placed in doubt.

== Crusading songs ==
Peirol supported the Third Crusade (1189–1192) and wrote a tenso, "Quant amors trobet partit" (When Love discovered that my heart / Had parted from his concerns), encouraging the kings of Europe to make peace and send aid to "the noble and valiant marquess" Conrad of Montferrat, then King of Jerusalem. Though Peirol expresses a desire to accompany his lord, Dalfi d'Alvernha, on the Crusade, he is ultimately convinced by Love not to abandon his lady (domna) by pointing out that "never by your intervention will the Turk and Arab yield up the Tower of David" and giving the counsel: "love and sing often."

It appears that Peirol never did go on the Third Crusade, but he eventually pilgrimaged to Jerusalem in 1221 and may have witnessed the surrender of Damietta. He placed some of the blame on the Emperor Frederick II in a crusading song — his last poem — entitled "Pus flum Jordan ai vist e.l monimen". He even went so far as to mock the imperial eagle (vostr'aigla, qu'en gitet us voutors) and praise the victorious Sultan of Egypt (Anta y avetz e.l Soudan onramen).

"M'entencio ai tot'en un vers mesa", one of Peirol's cansos and not one of his crusading songs, was used twice around the time of the Eighth Crusade (1270) as the basis for a contrafactum in support of the Crusades. First, Ricaut Bonomel, a Palestinian Templar, wrote a scathing analysis of the future of Christianity in the Holy Land, and a few years after that, Austorc d'Aurillac, composed a sirventes encouraging conversion to Islam. Both later poems were exercises in reverse psychology and attempts to spur further Crusades.

== Bibliography ==
The thirty-four surviving poems that constitute Peirol's complete works have been titled after their first line.

The cansos, alphabetically

- "Ab gran joi mou maintas vetz e comenssa"
- "Atressi co.l signes fai"
- "Be.m cujava que no chantes oguan"
- "Ben dei chantar puois amors m'o enseigna"
- "Car m'era de Joi lunhatz"
- "Camjat ai mon consirier"
- "Cora qu'amors vuelha"
- "Coras que.m fezes doler"
- "D'eissa la razon qu'ieu suoill"
- "Del sieu tort farai esmenda"
- "D'un bon vers vau pensan com lo fezes"
- "D'un sonet vau pensan"
- "En joi que.m demora"
- "Eu non lausarai ja mon chan"
- "La gran alegransa"
- "Mainta gens mi malrazona"
- "M'entencion ai tot' en un vers mesa"
- "Mout m'entremis de chantar voluntiers"
- "Nuills hom no s'auci tan gen"
- "Per dan que d'amor mi veigna"
- "Pos de mon joi vertadier"
- "Pos entremes me suy de far chansos"
- "Ren no val hom joves que no.s perjura"
- "Si be.m sui loing et entre gent estraigna"
- "Tot mon engeing e mon saber"
- "Tug miei cossir son d'amor e de chan"

The tensos, alphabetically

- "Dalfi, sabriatz me vos"
  (with Dalfi d'Alvernha)
- "Gaucelm, diguatz m'al vostre sen"
  (with Gaucelm Faidit)
- "Peirol, com avetz tan estat"
  (with Bernart de Ventadorn)
- "Peirol, pois vengutz es vas nos"
  (a cobla)
- "Pomairols, dos baros sai"
  (with Pomairol, Guionet, and one Peire)
- "Pus flum Jordan ai vist e.l monimen"
  (with "Dieus", God)
- "Quant Amors trobet partit"
  (with "Amors", Love)
- "Senher, qual penriaz vos"
  (with a "Senher", Lord)

== Modern recordings ==
Several dozens albums exist featuring at least one recording of a Peirol song.

| Poem | Recorded by | Album | Year |
|---|---|---|---|
| "Ab gran joi mou maintas vetz e comenssa" (as "Ab joi") | Graziella Benini, Walter Benvenuti | Troubadours, Vol. 3 + Courts, Kings, & Troubadours | 1979? |
| "D'eissa la razon qu'ieu suoill" (as "D'elsa la razon") | I Ciarlatani | Codex Manesse | 1996 |
| "D'un sonet vau pensan" | Graziella Benini, Walter Benvenuti | Troubadours, Vol. 3 + Courts, Kings, & Troubadours | 1979? |
| "Mainta gens mi malrazona" (as "Mainta jen me mal razona") | C. Carbi, R. Monterosso | Trouvères & Laudes | 1955? |
| "Mainta gens mi malrazona" (as "Manhta gens mi malrazona") | Gérard Zuchetto, et al. | Terre de Troubadours (Land of Troubadours) | 1998 |
| "Mainta gens mi malrazona" (as "Manhtas gens") | Troubadours Art Ensemble | Troubadours Art Ensemble – Vol. 2 | 2001 |
| "M'entencion ai tot' en un vers mesa" (as "M'entensio") | Ensemble Jehan de Channey | Trouvères et Troubadours | 1994 |
| "Per dan que d'amor mi veigna" (as "Per dan") | Graziella Benini, Walter Benvenuti | Troubadours, Vol. 3 + Courts, Kings, & Troubadours | 1979? |
| "Per dan que d'amor mi veigna" (as "Per dam que d'amor") | Troubadours Art Ensemble | Troubadours Art Ensemble – Vol. 2 | 2001 |
| "Quant Amors trobet partit" (as "Quant Amors trobèt partit") | Clemencic Consort | Troubadours | 1977 |
| "Quant Amors trobet partit" | Graziella Benini, Walter Benvenuti | Troubadours, Vol. 3 + Courts, Kings, & Troubadours | 1979? |
| "Quant Amors trobet partit" | Estampie | Crusaders in Nomine Domini | 1996 |
