= Jehan de Nuevile =

13th-century French trouvère

Jehan de Nuevile (c. 1200–1250) was the second son of Eustache de Nuevile, a minor nobleman with land in Neuville-Vitasse, near Arras, in medieval France. Jehan succeeded to the patrimony on the death of his elder brother, Eustache. He himself was dead by 1254, when his younger brother, Gilles, appears as lord at Neuville. Jehan is better known as a trouvère.

Colart le Boutellier dedicated one of his songs to Jehan. The song L'autrier par un matinet, dedicated to Colart, may be a response from Jehan, although there are competing attributions. The Chansonnier du Roi (BnF fr.844) ascribes sixteen chansons courtoises to Jehan in its table of contents, although six of these are attributed to two other poets, Gautier d'Espinal and Guiot de Dijon, in the rubrics. Only three of Jehan's pieces survive with melodies in the Chansonnier to Roi and these are his only pieces to appear in other manuscripts:

- Desoremais est raison
- Quant li boscages retentist
- L'autrier par un matinet

Jehan's chansons are generally heptasyllabic and isometric. All are in bar form. Also surviving on Jehan's name is a complainte, an Old French variant of the Old Occitan planh, a form rare in northern France. Its music is lost.
