= Templier (surname) =

Templier is a surname. Notable people with the surname include:

- Olivier lo Templier (fl. 1269), Knight Templar and troubadour probably from Catalonia
- Raymond Templier (1891–1968), French jewellery designer
- Sylvain Templier (born 1971), French politician

== See also ==
- Knights Templar
- Templiers de Sénart
