= Investiture of Abbaton =

Apocryphal apocalyptic text

The Investiture of Abbaton, the Enthronement of Abbaton, or the Encomium on Abbaton (alternatively spelled Abaddon; bl Or. 7025), is an apocalyptic, pseudepigraphical, and apocryphal text. (Note: Scholar Gavin McDowell 2017, p. 245, reviewing Suciu & Saweros 2016, writes that it is unclear whether the text was apocryphal for the New Testament or pseudepigraphical for the Old Testament, because it concerns the creation of Adam.) It describes the creation of Adam by God, Jesus, and the Holy Spirit; the fall of Satan; and the transformation of Muriel into Abbaton, the angel of death. The sole extant copy is dated to 981, and while its present version probably dates to the 700s, it may have an original from the 600s. It is purportedly written by Timothy of Alexandria.

== Description and contents ==
The Investiture of Abbaton has only one extant copy in the Sahidic dialect of Coptic. It is an apocalyptic text in the investiture genre. The surviving copy is dated to 981. While its present version likely dates to the 700s, an original may date to the 600s. The sole manuscript (bl Or. 7025, CC 0405) was copied from another in Esna and donated to a church in Edfu, both in present-day Egypt. The text was inspired by the Testament of Abraham and is purportedly written by Timothy of Alexandria, though this attestation is false. In Severus ibn al-Muqaffaʿ's Kitāb al-īḍāḥ (كتاب الإيضاح, 'explanation' or 'elucidation'), he attributes the Investiture of Abbaton to Theophilus of Alexandria (likely due to the close spellings of Timothy and Theophilus in Arabic), though which Theophilus he refers to is unclear. While scholar Haim Schwarzbaum writes that the story has a Muslim origin, this is also unclear, and Islamic angel of death stories (ʿIzrāʾīl) may have the same source material as the Investiture of Abbaton.

After an introduction by Timothy of Alexandria, six pages of which have been lost, the text describes the creation of Adam (including Jesus defending Adam to God, and his contribution to Adam's creation alongside the Holy Spirit and God), the fall of Satan (precipitated by a cherub), and the angel Muriel becoming Abbaton, the angel of death. Seven angels refuse to go to Eden to bring materials to form Adam because they predict the fall of man, but Muriel obliges; as a result, he is given control over the earth and humankind, and his name becomes Abbaton, the angel of death. He becomes a kind of king with a molten throne, similar to Hermetic and gnostic interpretations of demons and the Demiurge, respectively. It mentions John the Evangelist and responds to his questions about the angel of death.

== Notes and references ==
=== Works cited ===
- Lundhaug, Hugo (2022). "Sitting on the mount of olives: Revelation dialogues in Coptic apocrypha from Nag Hammadi to Edfu". In Tóth, Peter (ed.). Dialogues and disputes in Biblical disguise from late antiquity to the middle ages. Routledge. doi:10.4324/9781003091936-6. ISBN 9781003091936.
- McDowell, Gavin (2017). "New Testament Apocrypha: More Noncanonical Scriptures" (PDF). Apocrypha. 28: 241–252. doi:10.1484/J.APOCRA.5.115433.
- Suciu, Alin; Saweros, Ibrahim (2016). "The investiture of Abbaton, the angel of death: A new translation and introduction". In Burke, Tony; Landau, Brent (eds.). New Testament apocrypha: More noncanonical stories. Vol. 1. Eerdmans. ISBN 9780802872890.
- Tripaldi, Daniele (2021). "Apostles, long dead 'heretics', and monks: Noncanonical traditions on angels and protoplasts in two late antique Coptic apocalypses (7th–8th century CE)". In Dorfmann-Lazarev, Igor (ed.). Apocryphal and esoteric sources in the development of Christianity and Judaism. Texts and Studies in Eastern Christianity. Brill. ISBN 9789004445925.
