= Mohammedan SC =

Mohammedan Sporting Club may refer to the following sports teams:

- Mohammedan SC (Kolkata), sports club in Kolkata, India
- Mohammedan SC (women), women's football club in Kolkata, India
- Mohammedan SC (futsal), futsal club in Kolkata
- Mohammedan SC (Dhaka), sports club in Dhaka, Bangladesh
- Mohammedan SC (Chittagong), sports club in Chittagong, Bangladesh
- Mohammedan SC (Jhenaidah), sports club in Jhenaidah, Bangladesh
- Mohammedan Sporting Club cricket team, List A cricket team in Bangladesh
