= Colart le Boutellier =

Colart and a falcon

Colart le Boutellier (fl. 1240–1260) was a well-connected trouvère from Arras. There are no references to him independent of his own and others' songs, found in the chansonniers. One of these depicts the known coat-of-arms used by the Boutillier family, one of the petty noble clans of Arras, and assigns it to Colart. Another manuscript does not show any arms for Colart and it can be surmised that he was in fact a member of one of the middle-class families of the same name that could then be found in Arras. He may have been a relative of Robert le Boutellier, who judged a jeu parti between Thomas Herier and Gillebert de Berneville.

Two of his songs, Aucunes gens m'ont mout repris and Quant voi le tens del tout renouveler, Colart dedicated to a certain "Maître Guillaume" (William the master, i.e. teacher or one with a master's degree). This Guillaume is probably identical to the trouvère Guillaume li Vinier, with whom Colart exchanged a jeu parti, his only one: Guillaume, trop est perdus. Colart dedicated a song each to Jehan Bretel (Ne puis laissier), Jehan de Nuevile (Je ne sai tant merci crier) and Phelippot Verdière (Je n'ai pas droite). Jehan de Nuevile dedicated one to Colart in return. Colart also received dedications from Gillebert de Berneville, Guibert Kaukesel and Henri Amion. Je n'ai pas droite was used as the model for an anonymous song, Se j'ai du monde la flour. His Loiaus amours was a model for another anonymous song, Grant talent ai qu'a chanter, and provided the basis for a contrafactum by the Chastelain de Couci, La douce vois du rossignol salvage.

Thirteen songs by Colart are preserved in manuscripts. He preferred isometre, bar form and G modes. He "often drew material from the pedes in the cauda".

== Songs ==
Listed by incipit:

- Amours et bone esperance
- Aucunes gens m'ont mout repris
- Ce qu'on aprent en enfance
- Guillaume, trop est perdus
- J'avoie lessié de chanter
- Je n'ai pas droite ochoison
- Je ne sai tant merci crier
- Li beaus tens d'esté
- Loiaus amours et desiriers de joie
- Merveil moi que de chanter
- Ne puis laissier que je ne chant
- Onques mais en mon vivant
- Quant voi le tens del tout renouveler
