= Guilhem Fabre =

Guilhem or Guillem Fabre was a troubadour and burgher from Narbonne. He may be the same person as the dedicatee of En Guillems Fabres, sap fargar, a eulogistic poem by Bernart d'Auriac. He was one of several mid- to late-thirteenth-century troubadours from Narbonne, with Bernart Alanhan and Miquel de Castillon.

Guilhem's own works comprise On mais vei, plus trop sordejor, a sirventes on decadence, a Pos dels majors princeps auzem conten, a Crusade song. In the first, Guilhem criticises contemporary politics and religion as too worldly, relating them to the sorry state of the Holy Land at the time. In the second, inspired by piety, Guilhem blames internal wars in Christendom for the failures of the Crusades. He also suggests that the mendicant orders are partly to blame. It is universally agreed that this song was written after the loss of Jerusalem in 1244. Some scholars place it in the years 1245–58 (C. Fabre) or 1254–1269 (Karl Appel, Sergio Vatteroni). During the pontificate of Clement IV (1264–68) the wars between the Guelphs and Ghibellines were intense. Guilhem reveals his Ghibelline sympathies when he heaps especial blame on the pope, remarking that the pontiff himself has never led a crusade. Because of this reference to the pope, Guilhem's song cannot have been written during the papal interregnum of 1268–71. Scholar Amos Parducci suggests that it was written during the War of the Sicilian Vespers, as late as 1284–85.

The contemporary troubadour Uc de Saint Circ criticised Guilhem Fabre in his cobla esparsa Guillelms Fabres nos fai en brau lignatge for using such artful phrasing that his meaning is obscured. From this criticism it can be assumed that Guilhem belonged to the trobar clus school of composition, which favoured short words, a high ratio of consonants to vowels, and generally harsh sounds and unusual rimes. The identification of "Guillelms Fabres" with Guilhem is problematic. Several internal usages suggest that Uc's criticisms may be particularly appropriate to Guilhem Ademar, in which case "Fabre" may be read as a nickname meaning "[word]smith".

== Sources ==
- Bibliografia Elettronica dei Trovatori, v. 2.0
