= Olivier lo Templier =

Olivier lo Templier (Occitan: [uliviˈe lu templiˈe]; fl. 1269) was a Knight Templar and troubadour probably from Catalonia. He appears as lo templier En'Olivier in one chansonnier, in which is preserved his only known work, Estat aurai lonc temps en pessamen ("I have been worrying for a long time"). He may be identical with Ramon Oliver who appears as commander of the Templar house of Gardeny near Lleida in 1295. He should not be confused with another troubadour Templar, Ricaut Bonomel, whose style was very different and who wrote from the Holy Land.

Olivier's canso de crozada (crusade song) can be dated precisely because of its reference to the Crusader fleet which left Barcelona with King James I of Aragon at its head in 1269. Olivier wrote the song to James, of whom he was hearty supporter, and the barons of Catalonia praising their courage even after they were forced to abort their expedition. His goal was to convince James to set out once again to recover the Church of the Holy Sepulchre. Linda Paterson translates lines 17–24:

Rey d'Arago, de tot mal non chalen,
c'avetz conqist de Tortos'al Biar
e Malhoga, sovenga.us d'otramar,
pus qe autre non pot esser tenens
del sieu Temple qe avetz tan gen servit.
E car vos es del mon lo pus ardit
de fag d'armas, ni Roma vo.n covida,
acorretz lai on tot lo mon vos crida.

King of Aragon, undaunted by all evil—
for you have been victorious from Tortosa to Biar
and Mallorca—be mindful of Outremer,
since no-one else can preserve
His Temple which you have served so nobly.
And since you are the bravest in the world
at deeds of arms and Rome is inviting you to do so,
hurry there where everyone is calling out for you.

Olivier's Catalan identity can only be posited on the internal evidence of his canso, the last line of which mentions the lord of Gelida, Guerau de Cervelló, with whom Olivier may have had links. There is also evidence of Catalanism in his declension, but this may be attributable to the copyist(s) and not Olivier. His affection for James, too, cannot be taken as evidence of Catalan identity in and of itself.
