= Guibert Kaukesel =

Medieval French trouvère

Maistre Guibert Kaukesel or Hubert Chaucesel (fl. c. 1230–55) was a trouvère from Arras, where he is named as a canon in a document of the Cathédrale Notre-Dame in 1250. His title indicates he was probably a Master of Arts. He was a member of the literary circle active at Arras mid-century.

Four chansons courtoises survive with an attribution to Guibert, occurring in two distinct transmission patterns. Reference to them here will use the numbers given in the standard catalogue. One pair of songs (RS924 and RS811) are found copied next to one another in MSS M and T, sources associated with Arras. The other two are found, also copied next to each other, as unica in Trouvère MS R.

- Chanter voudrai d'amours qui m'est estraigne (RS118), found uniquely in Trouvère MS R.
- Fins cuer enamourés (RS924), found in MSS M and T.
- Quant voi le dous tens aparoir (RS1785), found in MSS M and T.
- Un chant nouvel vaurai faire chanter (RS811), found in MSS M and T. The text refers to the song itself as a 'barade', which has been interpreted in Tischler's complete edition as meaning 'balade'.

Fins cuer mentions to his fellow Artesian poet-composers Jehan Erart, Colart le Boutellier, and someone called Dragon (Drogon). All four pieces differ in musical structure and Quant voi is the only one in the common bar form, the usual song form often now called pedes cum cauda when applied to medieval French song. They are melodically simple, restricted in range, and have strong tonal centres.
