= Termagant =

Medieval European term and character

Text from a manuscript of the Chanson de Guillaume: Tresque il vendreit de aurer Tervagant

In the Middle Ages, Termagant or Tervagant was the name of a god that some European Christians believed Muslims worshipped. It originates in the eleventh-century Song of Roland.

The word is also used in modern English to mean a violent, overbearing, turbulent, brawling, quarrelsome woman; a virago, shrew, or vixen.

== Etymology ==
European literature from the Middle Ages often refers to Muslims as pagans and depicts them worshipping Muhammad along with various idols and sometimes other deities, such as Apollyon, Lucifer and Termagant. In some writings, such as the Song of Roland, these were combined to create an "unholy Trinity" of sorts composed of Apollyon, Muhammad and Termagant.

The original form of the name is Tervagan. There are many hypotheses explaining the origin of the name, but it does not seem to derive from any actual aspect of Muslim belief or practice, however wildly distorted. Gustav Beckmann lists 23 different theories. He defends that first proposed by Ugo Foscolo in 1819 that Tervagan is the dea trivia, the threefold moon goddess Luna–Diana–Proserpina (or Selene–Artemis–Hecate), attested since classical antiquity. Thus, ter vagan means 'three wandering [i.e., like the moon]'. Apollyon (Apollin) is simply Apollo, Diana's brother.

Walter William Skeat, accepting the meaning "thrice wandering" as a reference to the moon, tied the name "Trivagante" to the Islamic use of crescent moon imagery. Joseph T. Shipley argues that the Italian Trivigante became confused with termigisto, meaning "boaster," derived from Hermes Trismegistus, leading to Termagant. Leo Spitzer argues that Tervagant, like several other names ending in -ant from the Matter of France (e.g. Baligant and Morgant), is an "occitanization" of a vulgar Latin present participle created by Old French poets for exotic effect. He proposes as its etymon terrificans ("terrifying"), appropriate for a god. Alternately, Aleksander Gieysztor derives the name from the Slavic deity Triglav, with the name having spread west into French-speaking lands.

James A. Bellamy proposes that the names Tervagan and Apollin in the Song of Roland derive from Ibn ʿAffān and Abū Bakr, two of Muhammad's companions, in-laws and successors.

== Termagant in literature ==
Whatever its origins, "Termagant" became established in the West as the supposed name of the principal idol supposedly worshipped by Saracens, being regularly mentioned in chivalric romances and chansons de geste. The spelling of the name varies considerably (Tervigant, Tervagant, Tarvigant, etc.).

In Occitan literature, the troubadour Austorc d'Aorlhac refers to Bafomet and Termagant (Tervagan) side by side in one sirventes, referring also to the latter's "companions".

In the 15th-century Middle English romance Syr Guy of Warwick, a Sultan swears an oath by Termagant.

In the Chanson de Roland, the Saracens, having lost the battle of Roncesvalles, desecrate their "pagan idols" (lines 2589–90) including Tervagan.

Tervagant is also a statue worshipped by the "king of Africa" in his Jean Bodel play in Old French, written after the end of the Third Crusade (c.1200), Le jeu de saint Nicolas.

In the Sowdone of Babylone, the sultan makes a vow to Termagaunte(lines 135–40):

Of Babiloyne the riche Sowdon,
Moost myghty man he was of moolde;
He made a vowe to Termagaunte:
Whan Rome were distroied and hade myschaunce,
He woolde turne ayen erraunte
And distroye Charles, the Kinge of Fraunce.

In Geoffrey Chaucer's The Canterbury Tales, "Sir Thopas" (supposed to be told by Chaucer himself on the pilgrimage) is a parody of these chivalric romances. In the tale, a knight giant named "Sir Oliphaunt" is made to swear an oath by Termagant.

In Herman Melville's Mardi (Chapters 25, 26, 28), Samoa's wife Annatoo is described as a Termagant, and metaphorically referred to as Antonina to Samoa's Belisarius. Explaining why she did not need the armaments on the ship, Melville writes "Her voice was a park of artillery; her talons a charge of bayonets." (Chapter 23.)

Ludovico Ariosto used the form Trivigante.

It has been claimed that Termagant became a stock character in medieval mystery plays but another source denies this. In the theatre, Termagant was usually depicted as a turbanned creature who wore a long, Eastern style gown. As a stage-villain, he would rant at and threaten the lesser villains who were his servants and worshipers.

== "Termagant" as a ranting bully and a shrewish woman ==
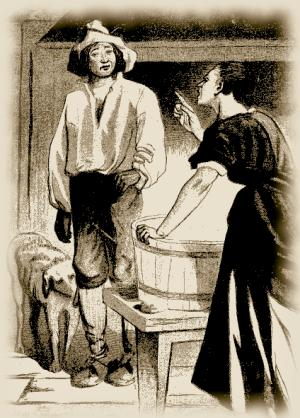
Rip Van Winkle scolded by his "termagant wife", 1870 illustration by Sol Eytinge Jr.

As a result of the theatrical tradition, by Shakespeare's day the term had come to refer to a bullying person. Henry IV, part 1 contains a reference to "that hot termagant Scot". In Hamlet, the hero says of ham actors that "I would have such a fellow whipped for o'er-doing Termagant, it out-Herods Herod". Herod, like Termagant, was also a character from medieval drama who was famous for ranting. Beaumont and Fletcher's play, A King and No King, contains the line "This would make a saint swear like a soldier, and a soldier like Termagant."

Mainly because of Termagant's depiction in long gowns, and given that female roles were routinely played by male actors in Shakespearean times, English audiences got the mistaken notion that the character was female, or at least that he resembled a mannish woman. As a result, the name "termagant" came increasingly to be applied to a woman with a quarrelsome, scolding quality, a sense that it retains today. This was a well-established usage by the late 17th century. Thomas Shadwell's play The Squire of Alsatia (1688) contains a character called Mrs Termagant who is out for revenge on one of the other characters, and is described as a "furious, malicious, and revengeful woman; perpetually plaguing him, and crossing him in all his designs; pursuing him continually with her malice, even to the attempting of his life." Arthur Murphy's play The Upholsterer (1758) also contains a female character called "Termagant". In Washington Irving's "Rip Van Winkle" (1819), Dame Van Winkle is described as a "termagant wife". "Virago", "fishwife" and "shrew" are near-synonyms for "termagant" in this sense. In season 2 of Westworld, Major Craddock calls Dolores a termagant.

The term is still sometimes used of men. In 2008, the Australian politician Kim Beazley labelled opponent Tony Abbott a termagant.

== See also ==
- Baphomet
- Mahound
- Mohammedan
- Orientalism
