= Muriel (angel) =

Angel in Abrahamic religions

Muriel is a Domination or Dominion (one of the 'Second Sphere' Angels) in Western Christian angelology. Its name is derived from the Greek myrrh.

Muriel is the angel of the month of June, is associated with the astrological sign of Cancer, and is invoked from the south. In the apocryphal Enthronement of Abbaton, Muriel becomes Abaddon, the angel of death.

== See also ==
- List of angels in theology
