= Dogme et Rituel de la Haute Magie =

Book by Éliphas Lévi on ritual magic

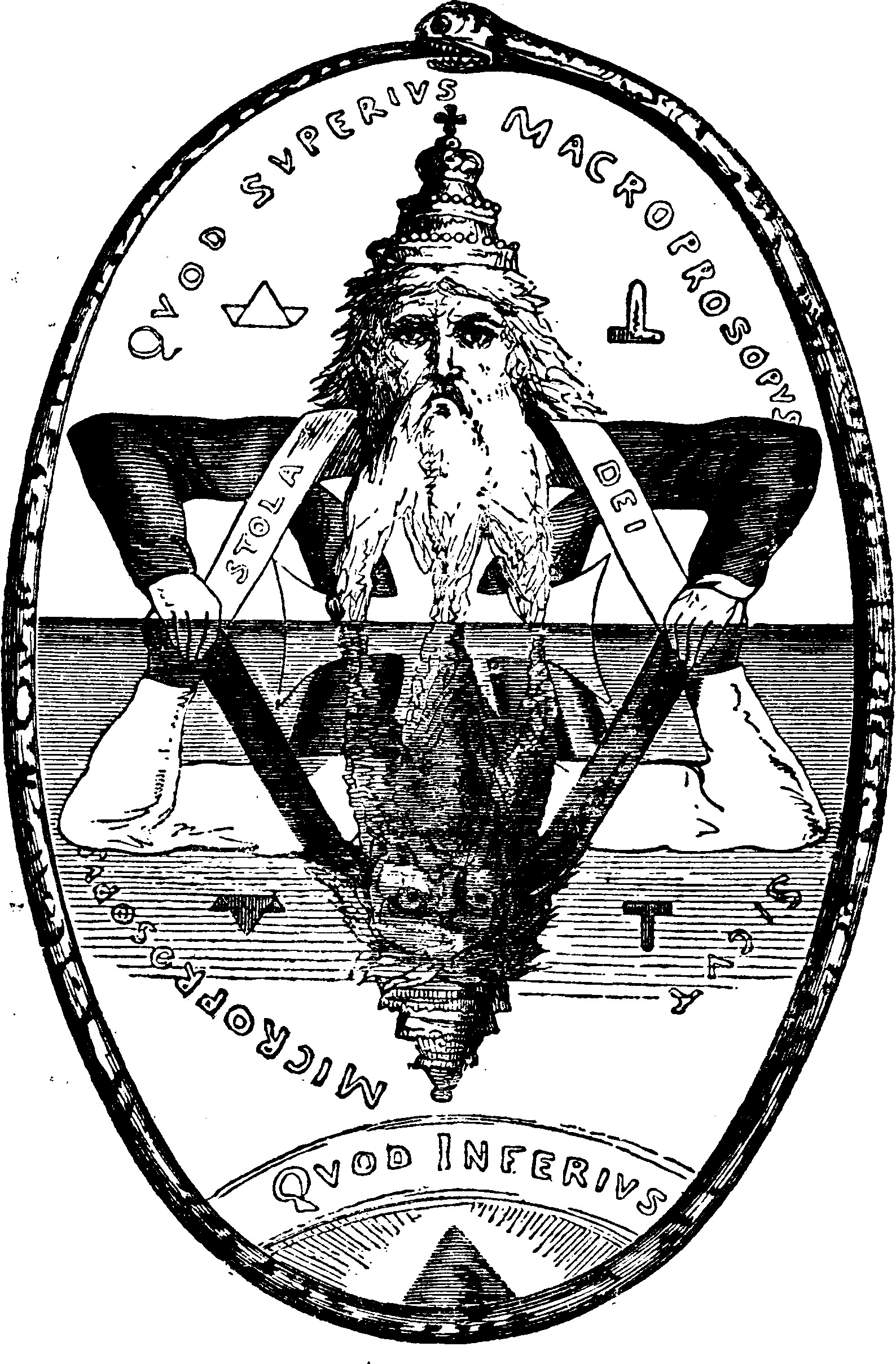
Seal of Solomon, frontispiece of Volume I (Dogme)

Dogme et Rituel de la Haute Magie (English: "Dogma and Ritual of High Magic") is the title of Éliphas Lévi's first published treatise on ritual magic, which appeared in two volumes between 1854 (Dogme) and 1856 (Rituel). Each volume is structured into 22 chapters, which parallel the tarot.

== Translations ==
Lévi's Dogme et Rituel de la Haute Magie was translated into English by Arthur Edward Waite as Transcendental Magic, its Doctrine and Ritual (1896). Waite added a biographical preface and footnotes. A revised edition of this translation was published in 1923.

A second translation, The Doctrine and Ritual of High Magic: A New Translation, by John Michael Greer and Mark Mikituk, was published in 2017 by TarcherPerigee, and a third one, The Dogma and Ritual of High Magic, by Mehrdad Philalethes in 2026.

== Response ==
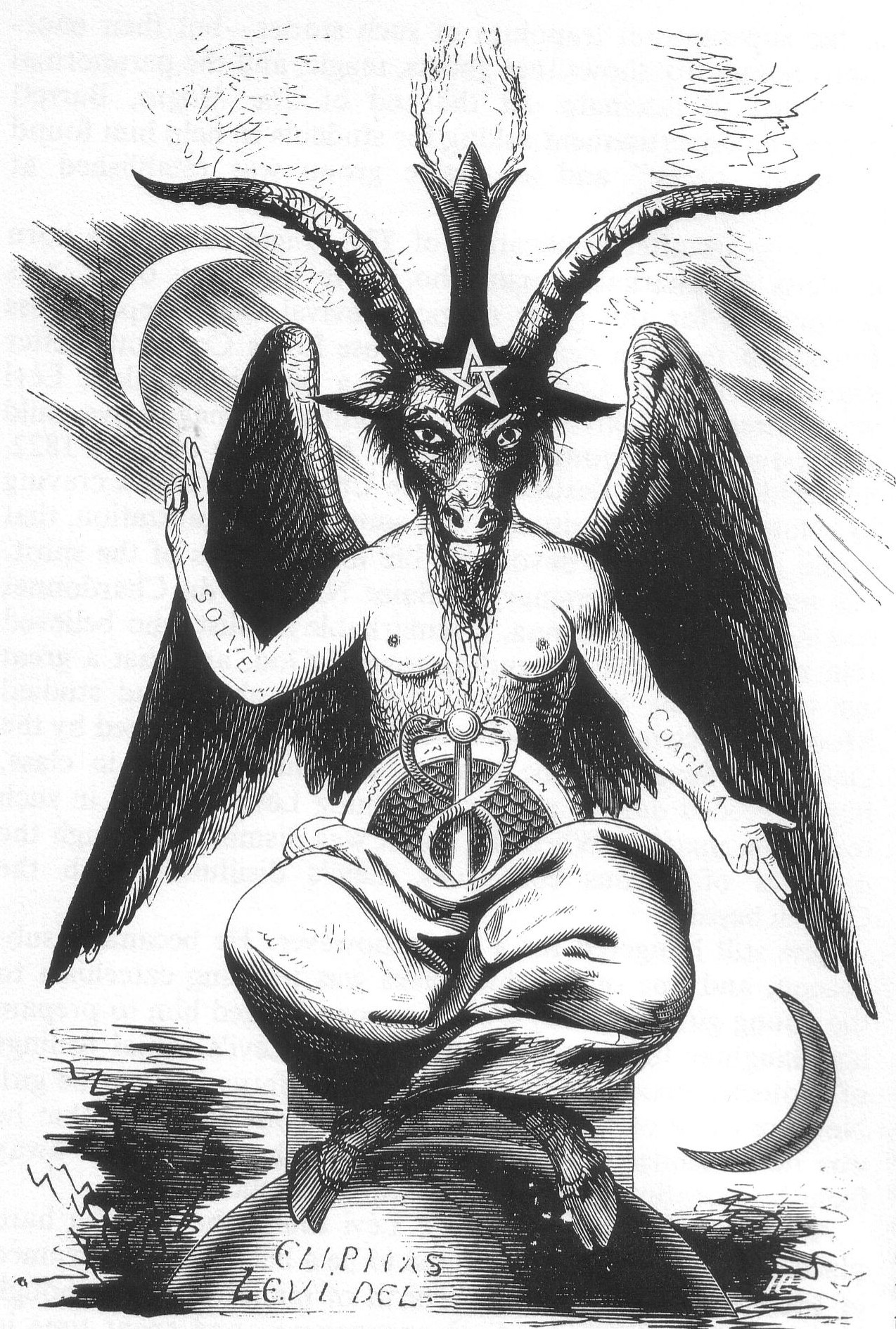
Baphomet, frontispiece of Volume II (Rituel)

=== Modern ===
The work has recently attracted the attention of scholars for its views on the study of magic, religion, natural science and alchemy. Lévi sees magic as occupying a place between science and religion and believes that it has the potential to act as a conciliatory or mediating function between the two views. Lévi rejects views, such as E. B. Taylor's, that magic or religion is inherently irrational and has been superseded by modern science. Instead he posits magic as an "esoteric science" and suggests that Hermeticism could be adapted to find the underlying truth behind all magical systems, calling for a "comparative magic." Lévi thus posits a type of Perennialism buttressed by comparative theology and comparative religion, anticipating modern-day religious studies and paralleling contemporary comparative projects in anthropology and philology such as the work of Max Müller.

=== Contemporary ===
A new translation of the book was published in paperback and released on April 4, 2017 by Greer (an occult scholar) and Mikituk. Greer also published a follow-up commentary to the work in 2026, titled The Great Arcanum.

Another translation, including the full text of the Preliminary Discourse by Lévi, was published by Philalethes in 2026, with paperback, hardcover and ebook editions.
