= Abaddon =

Place of destruction and the archangel of the abyss in the Hebrew Bible

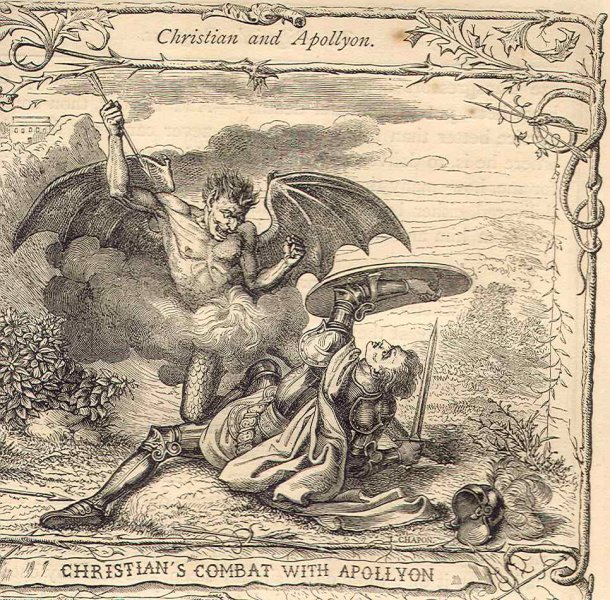
Apollyon (top) battling Christian in John Bunyan's The Pilgrim's Progress

The Hebrew term Abaddon (Hebrew: אֲבַדּוֹן ’Ăḇaddōn, meaning "destruction", "doom") and its Greek equivalent Apollyon (Koine Greek: Ἀπολλύων, Apollúōn meaning "Destroyer") appear in the Bible as both a place of destruction and an angel of the abyss. In the Hebrew Bible, abaddon is used with reference to a bottomless pit, often appearing alongside the place Sheol (שְׁאוֹל Šəʾōl), meaning the resting place of the dead.

In the Book of Revelation of the New Testament, an angel called Abaddon is described as the king of an army of locusts; his name is first transcribed in Koine Greek (Revelation 9:11—"whose name in Hebrew is Abaddon") as Ἀβαδδών, and then translated Ἀπολλύων, Apollyon. The Vulgate and the Douay–Rheims Bible have additional notes not present in the Greek text, "in Latin Exterminans", exterminans being the Latin word for "destroyer".

In medieval Christian literature, Abaddon's portrayal diverges significantly, as seen in the "Song of Roland", an 11th-century epic poem. Abaddon is depicted as part of a fictional trinity, alongside Muhammad (Mahound) and Termagant (Termagaunt), which the poem attributes to the religious practices of Muslims.

== Etymology ==
According to the Brown–Driver–Briggs lexicon, the Hebrew אבדון ’ăḇadōn is an intensive form of the Semitic root and verb stem אָבַד ’ăḇāḏ "perish", transitive "destroy", which occurs 184 times in the Hebrew Bible. The Septuagint, an early Greek translation of the Hebrew Bible, renders "Abaddon" as "ἀπώλεια" (apṓleia), while the Greek Apollýon is the active participle of ἀπόλλυμι apóllymi, "to destroy".

== Judaism ==
=== Hebrew Bible ===
The term abaddon appears six times in the Masoretic Text of the Hebrew Bible; abaddon means destruction or "place of destruction", or the realm of the dead, and is accompanied by Sheol.

- Job 26:6: Sheol is naked before Him; Abaddon has no cover.
- Job 28:22: Abaddon and Death say, "We have only a report of it."
- Job 31:12: A fire burning down to Abaddon, Consuming the roots of all my increase.
- Psalm 88:11: Is your steadfast love declared in the grave, or your faithfulness in Abaddon?
- Proverbs 15:11: Sheol and Abaddon lie exposed to the LORD, How much more the minds of men!
- Proverbs 27:20: Sheol and Abaddon cannot be satisfied, Nor can the eyes of man be satisfied.

=== Second Temple era texts ===
The Thanksgiving Hymns—a text found amongst the Dead Sea Scrolls in 1947—tell of "the Sheol of Abaddon" and of the "torrents of Belial [that] burst into Abaddon". The Biblical Antiquities (misattributed to Philo) mention Abaddon as a place (destruction) rather than as an individual. Abaddon is also one of the compartments of Gehenna. By extension, the name can refer to an underworld abode of lost souls, or Gehenna.

=== Rabbinical literature ===
In some legends, Abaddon is identified as a realm where the damned lie in fire and snow, one of the places in Gehenna that Moses visited.

== Christianity ==
The New Testament contains the first known depiction of Abaddon as an individual entity instead of a place.

A king, the angel of the bottomless pit; whose name in Hebrew is Abaddon, and in Greek Apollyon; in Latin Exterminans.

— Revelation 9:11, Douay–Rheims Bible

In the Old Testament, Abaddon and Death can be personified:

Abaddon and Death say, ‘We have heard a rumor of it with our ears.’

— Job 28:22, English Standard Version

And,

Sheol is naked before God, and Abaddon has no covering.

— Job 26:6, English Standard Version

And,

Sheol and Abaddon are never satisfied, and never satisfied are the eyes of man.

— Proverbs 27:20, English Standard Version

Hell and destruction are not filled; so also are the eyes of men insatiable.

— Proverbs 27:20, Brenton Septuagint Translation

And,

But whoso committeth adultery with a woman lacketh understanding: he that doeth it destroyeth his own soul.

— Proverbs 6:32, King James Bible

But the adulterer through want of sense procures destruction to his soul.

— Proverbs 6:32, Brenton Septuagint Translation

The Hebrew text of Proverbs 6:32 does not contain the noun abaddon (אֲבַדּוֹן) but a participial form of the verb shachath (שָׁחַת). But the Septuagint uses apoleian (ἀπώλειαν), the accusative case of the noun apoleia (ἀπώλεια) with which it also translates abaddon in five of the six Hebrew verses that contain the word. (Though an English interlinear of the Septuagint might read "destruction the soul of him obtains", the reader should understand that "adulterer" is the subject, "soul" is the indirect object, and "destruction" is the direct object.)

In Revelation 9:11, Abaddon is described as "Destroyer", the angel of the Abyss, and as the king of a plague of locusts resembling horses with crowned human faces, women's hair, lions' teeth, wings, iron breast-plates, and a tail with a scorpion's stinger that torments for five months anyone who does not have the seal of God on their foreheads.

The symbolism of Revelation 9:11 leaves the identity of Abaddon open to interpretation. Protestant commentator Matthew Henry (1708) believed Abaddon to be the Antichrist, whereas the Jamieson-Fausset-Brown Bible Commentary (1871) and Henry Hampton Halley (1922) identified the angel as Satan.

Early in John Bunyan's The Pilgrim's Progress the Christian pilgrim fights "over half a day" long with the demon Apollyon. This book permeated Christianity in the English-speaking world for 300 years after its first publication in 1678.

In contrast, the Methodist publication The Interpreter's Bible states, "Abaddon, however, is an angel not of Satan but of God, performing his work of destruction at God's bidding", citing the context at Revelation chapter 20, verses 1 through 3. Jehovah's Witnesses also cite Revelation 20:1-3 where the angel having "the key of the abyss" is actually shown to be a representative of God, concluding that "Abaddon" is another name for Jesus after his resurrection.

=== In medieval Christian literature ===
In medieval Christian literature, the depiction of Abaddon often mirrors the religious and cultural contexts of the time. A notable illustration of this is found in the Song of Roland, an 11th-century epic poem. This work associates Abaddon with figures such as Mahome (Mahound), Apollyon (Appolin), and Termagant, which are presented as deities in the context of the poem's portrayal of Muslims. The inclusion of Apollyon, a name sometimes linked with Abaddon in Christian texts, highlights the interpretative approaches of the period towards Islamic practices.

Such literary representations in medieval Christian literature are indicative of the broader context of interfaith understanding and relations during the Middle Ages. They reflect the complexities and nuances in the depiction of figures like Abaddon and their perceived associations with other faiths.

== Mandaeism ==
Mandaean scriptures such as the Ginza Rabba mention the Abaddons (Classical Mandaic: ʿbdunia) as part of the World of Darkness. The Right Ginza mentions the existence of the "upper Abaddons" (ʿbdunia ʿlaiia) as well as the "lower Abaddons" (ʿbdunia titaiia). The final poem of the Left Ginza mentions the "House of the Abaddons" (bit ʿbdunia).

Häberl (2022) considers the Mandaic word ʿbdunia to be a borrowing from Hebrew.

== Apocryphal texts ==
In the 3rd-century Gnostic text Acts of Thomas, Abaddon is the name of a demon, or the devil himself.

Abaddon is given particularly important roles in two sources, a homily entitled The Enthronement of Abaddon by pseudo-Timothy of Alexandria, and the Book of the Resurrection of Jesus Christ, by Bartholomew the Apostle. In the homily by Timothy, Abaddon was first named Muriel, and had been given the task by God of collecting the earth that would be used in the creation of Adam. Upon completion of this task, the angel was appointed as a guardian. Everyone, including the angels, demons, and corporeal entities feared him. Abaddon was promised that any who venerated him in life could be saved. Abaddon is also said to have a prominent role in the Last Judgment, as the one who will take the souls to the Valley of Josaphat. He is described in the Book of the Resurrection of Jesus Christ as being present in the Tomb of Jesus at the moment of the resurrection of Jesus.

== See also ==
- Abaddon in popular culture
- Apollo
- List of angels in theology
- Maalik
- Muriel (angel)
