= Bernart Alanhan de Narbona =

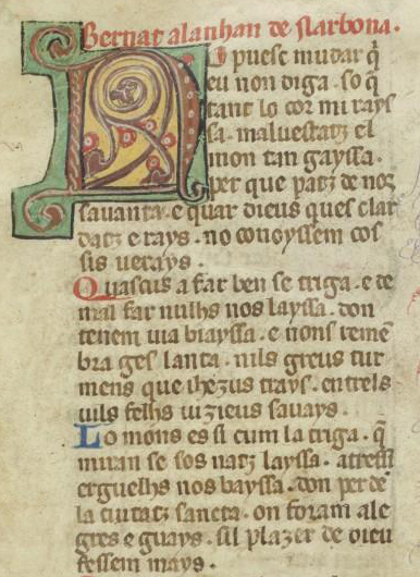
Bernart Alanhan de Narbona: "No puesc mudar qu'ieu non diga" BNF Français ms. 856 f. 383v (detail)

Bernart Alanhan de Narbona was a minor troubadour probably from Narbonne. He left behind only one song, No posc mudar qu'eu no diga, a sirventes about the loss of Jerusalem to the Saracens, though it was not classified as a Crusade song in the seminal work on the genre by Kurt Lewent (1905).

Three different datings have been offered based on the internal reference to Jerusalem. In 2003 Linda Paterson suggested a terminus post quem of 1187, since the first loss of Jerusalem to the Saracens—during the time of the troubadours—was to Saladin. In 1885 Camille Chabaneau, who was followed by Carl Appel in 1892, first suggested that the poem was written between 1245 and 1250 in response to the loss of the city to the Turks in 1244. An allusion to the city's occupation by the Egyptians, who signed Jerusalem over to the Emperor Frederick II in 1239, is cited in support of this.
