= Philippe de Nanteuil =

French knight and trouvère

- Occupations: knight, trouvère
- Known for: Crusades, poetry

Philippe de Nanteuil was a French knight and trouvère. He inherited the seigneurie of Nanteuil-le-Haudouin from his father, also Philippe de Nanteuil. He was a vassal of Thibaut de Champagne, who was king of Navarre and also a trouvère, and became his friend.

In 1239 Gautier de Brienne, the count of Jaffa, along with De Nanteuil and many other French crusaders, was taken prisoner by the Ayyubids during the Barons' Crusade, and imprisoned in Cairo. There De Nanteuil wrote a crusade song, En chantant veil mon duel faire, critical of the military orders.
