= Oliphant (band) =

Finnish band

Oliphant is a Finnish band playing medieval music.

== History ==
The Oliphant ensemble for medieval music has a repertoire consisting of music from the 12th century to the polyphonic ars nova. Formed in 1995, it has brought to light and recorded a wealth of previously unknown trouvère music. Its colourful performances, drawing on improvisation, have won the admiration of audiences and critics alike, and its CDs Songs from the Crusades and Gace Brulé were nominated for the title of classical Record of the Year by the leading Finnish daily Helsingin Sanomat in 2000 and 2004, respectively. Joie Fine, released in 2006, is of chansons pieuses – pious trouvère songs of the 13th century. In 2008 and 2009, Oliphant immersed itself in German medieval music, resulting in a HERZ, PRICH! – HEART, BREAK! concert and disc.

Oliphant has appeared abroad in Sweden, France and elsewhere and at numerous Finnish music festivals. In addition to giving concerts of its own and performing on other occasions, it was one of the architects of the production of the medieval liturgical drama Ludis Danielis and has premiered new Finnish music. Its repertoire consists of trouvère songs of various kinds (chansons de croisades, chansons pieuses, chansons de femme), German medieval music and items from such collections as Carmina Burana and Cantigas de Santa Maria. Representing polyphonic music are works by Guillaume de Machaut, Francesco Landini and Oswald Wolkenstein, and Ars Antiqua.

The members of Oliphant play a variety of historical instruments, each in their own distinctive way. The basic sound is produced by the human voice, fiddle, recorder, hammered dulcimer and medieval lute, but the ensemble can also turn its hand to many of the instruments familiar in the Middle Ages: citole, bombard, bagpipes, slide trumpet, symphony, double flute, bells, Jew's harp and many kinds of drums and other percussion instruments.

== Members ==
- Uli Kontu-Korhonen, soprano, hammered dulcimer
- Janek Öller, recorders, bagpipes
- Leif Karlson, citole, lute, percussion
- Eira Karlson, fiddle, slide trumpet

== Discography ==
- Deus ad un turnei enpris Chansons de croisades (2000)
- Gace Brulé (2004)
- Joie fine Chansons pieuses (2006)
- Herz, Prich! Heart, break! Medieval German Music (2010)
