= Neidhardt =

Neidhardt is a surname of German origin. Notable people with the surname include:

- Elke Neidhardt (1941–2013), German-Australian actress
- Franjo Neidhardt (1907–1984), Croatian architect
- Frederick C. Neidhardt (1931–2016), American microbiologist
- Juraj Neidhardt (1901–1979), Yugoslav architect
- Velimir Neidhardt (born 1943), Croatian architect
- John G. Neihardt (1881-1973), American poet, author, and ethnographer
