= Theophilus of Alexandria =

Theophilus of Alexandria may refer to:

- Theophilus I of Alexandria, ruled in 385–412
- Theophilus II (Coptic patriarch of Alexandria), ruled in 952–956
- Theophilus II (Greek patriarch of Alexandria), ruled in 1010–1020
- Theophilus III of Alexandria, Greek patriarch in 1805–1825

== See also ==
- Pseudo-Theophilus of Alexandria
