= Crusade song =

Music genre

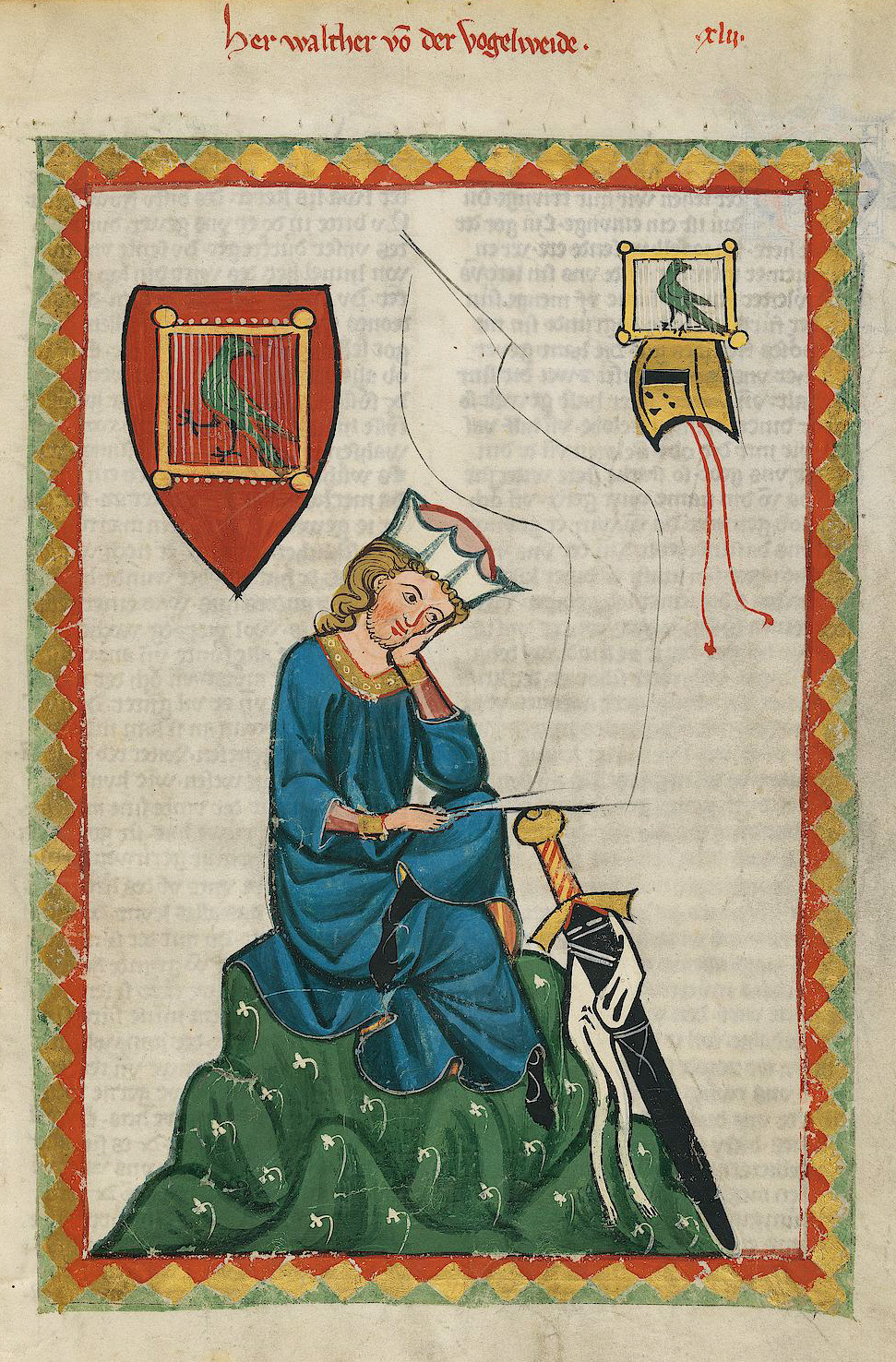
Illustration of Walther von der Vogelweide, composer of the Crusade song Palästinalied, in the Codex Manesse (ms. C, fol. 124r).

A Crusade song (Occitan: canso de crozada, Catalan: cançó de croada, German: Kreuzlied) is any vernacular lyric poem about the Crusades. Crusade songs were popular in the High Middle Ages: 106 survive in Occitan, forty in Old French, thirty in Middle High German, two in Italian, and one in Old Castilian. The study of the Crusade song, which may be considered a genre of its own, was pioneered by Kurt Lewent. He provided a classification of Crusade songs and distinguished between songs which merely mentioned, in some form, a Crusade from songs which were "Crusade songs". Since Lewent, scholars have added several classifications and definitions of Crusade songs. Scholars have argued for three different classifications of Crusade songs which include songs of exhortation, love songs, and songs which criticize the Crusading movement.

The Crusade song was not confined to the topic of the Latin East, but could concern the Reconquista in Spain, the Albigensian Crusade in Languedoc, or the political crusades in Italy. The first Crusade to be accompanied by songs, none of which survive, was the Crusade of 1101, of which William IX of Aquitaine wrote, according to Orderic Vitalis. From the Second Crusade survive one French and ten Occitan songs. The Third and Fourth Crusades generated many songs in Occitan, French, and German. Occitan troubadours dealt especially with the Albigensian campaigns in the early thirteenth century, but their decline thereafter left the later Crusades—Fifth, Sixth, Seventh, and Eighth—to be covered primarily by the German Minnesänger and French trouvères.

== List of Occitan crusading songs ==
The following list is only of those songs defined as "Kreuzlied" in Lewent, "Das altprovenzalische Kreuzlied" (Berlin: 1905). Lewent only lists the Crusade songs that have a call to crusade. For a more complete list, see the new database by Paterson.

Composer	Number	Incipit (i.e. title)	Date and context
Aimeric de Belenoi	9.10	Consiros com partitz d'amor	Between Battle of Hattin and January 1188.
Aimeric de Peguillan	10.11	Ara parra qual seran envejos	1213, addressed to William VI of Montferrat to go to Syria.
Bertran de Born	80.30	Nostre seigner somonis el meteis	Early November/December 1187, or after January 1188, after Battle of Hattin when Bertran thought Philip I of France had made a crusading vow.
Bertran de Born	80.40	S'eu fos aissi seigner e poderos	
Elias Cairel	133.11	Qui saubes dar tant bon conseil denan	Before August 1219, forecasting an easy Crusader victory at Cairo.
Folquet de Marselha	155.7	Chantars mi torn' ad afan	November 1194 – 10 July 1195, probably during truce between Richard I of England and Philip I of France, before Battle of Alarcos and the German Crusade.
Folquet de Marselha	155.15	Oimais no.i conosc razo	After 19 July 1195, date of the Battle of Alarcos. A song about the Reconquista.
Falquet de Romans	156.12	Quan lo dous temps ven e vai la freidors	Before 1228, during Albigensian Crusade and conflict between Empire and Papacy.
Gaucelm Faidit	167.9	Ara nos sia guitz	1203, but probably consisting of parts written at the time of the Third Crusade and some from the Fourth.
Gaucelm Faidit	167.14	Cascus hom deu conoisser et entendre	1201.
Gauceran de Saint Leidier or Guillem de Saint Leidier	234.10 or 168.1a	El temps que vei cazer foillas e flors	If by Gauceran, it is probably from before 1267 and contains references to Richard of Cornwall and James I of Aragon. If by Guillem, it dates to before 1183.
Gavaudan	174.10	Seignors, per los nostres peccatz	Possibly 1196–97, shortly after the Battle of Alarcos, but perhaps as late as 1210–12. A song about the Reconquista.
Guilhem Fabre	216.2	Pos dels majors / princeps auzem conten	June 1265 – February 1266.
Guilhem Figueira	217.2	D'un sirventes far	29 September 1127 – 28 June 1228. Gormonda of Monpeslier wrote a response to this sirventes contra Roma.
Guilhem Figueira	217.7	Totz hom qui be comens'e be fenis	1215, after the Emperor Frederick II took the cross on 25 July.
Giraut de Borneil	242.6	A l'onor Deu torn en mon chan	After 21 January 1188 but early in the year, praising Richard I of England, who is about to embark on Crusade.
Giraut de Borneil	242.41	Jois sia comensamens	After 1187, 1190 suggested.
Guiraut Riquier	248.48	Karitatz / et amors e fes	1276.
Lanfranc Cigala	282.20	Quan vei far bon fag plazentier	1244–45, to celebrate Louis IX's taking of the cross in 1244.
Lanfranc Cigala	282.23	Si mos chanz fos de ioi ni de solatz	November 1246 – Spring 1248, praising Louis IX of France for having gone on Crusade.
Lunel de Monteg	289.1	Mal veg trop apparelhar	1326, when Charles IV of France was vowing a Crusade.
Marcabru	293.21	Emperaire, per mi mezeis	After the spring of 1148, when some Christian were trapped at Attalia and converted to Islam.
Marcabru	293.35	Pax in nomine Domini	1149, after the failed Second Crusade, the loss of Tortosa to the Almohads, and the death of Baldwin of Marash (1146), but before the death of Raymond of Poitiers. A song about the Reconquista.
Olivier lo Templier	312.1	Estat aurai lonc temps en pessamen	1267–69, about the crusade of James I of Aragon and his conquest of Majorca and Valencia.
Anonymous, formerly Peire d'Alvergne	323.22	Ab fina joia comensa	After August 1198, when Innocent III proclaimed the Fourth Crusade, once thought to be between early 1213 – July 1214, before the Battle of Bouvines.
Pons de Capdolh	375.2	Ar nos sia capdelhs e garentia	Around 1213.
Pons de Capdolh	375.8	En honor del pair'en cui es	Early 1213, refers to the Emperor Otto IV, Frederick I of Sicily, and war between John of England and Philip II of France.
Pons de Capdolh	375.22	So qu'om plus vol e plus es voluntos	June 1213, refers to the Emperor Otto IV, Frederick I of Sicily, and Peter II of Aragon.
Raimbaut de Vaqueiras	392.3	Ara pot hom conoisser e proar	1201, in celebration of the election of Boniface I of Montferrat at Soissons to lead the Fourth Crusade.
Raimbaut de Vaqueiras	392.9a	Conseill don a l'emperador	After May 1204, after conquest of Constantinople and election of Baldwin IX of Flanders as emperor.
Raimon Gaucelm de Beziers	401.1	Ab grans trebalhs et ab grans marrimens	1270, refers to the death of Louis IX of France on the Eighth Crusade.
Raimon Gaucelm de Beziers	401.8	Qui vol aver complida amistansa	1268, urging support for the Eighth Crusade.
Raimon de Cornet	I		1332, after Philip VI of France took the cross in July. The Battle of Adramyttion (1334) was a related endeavour.

== List of French crusading songs ==
The following table is adapted from Smith, Age of Joinville, p. 17, who cites Les chansons de croisade, eds J. Bédier and P. Aubry (Paris, 1909), p. xxxv.

Composer	Incipit (i.e. title)	Crusade	Number of manuscripts
anonymous	Chevalier mult estes guariz	Second Crusade (1147–1149)	1
Conon de Béthune	Ahi! Amours, con dure departie	Third Crusade (1189–1192)	13
Conon de Béthune	Bien me dusse targier	Third Crusade	7
Huon d'Oisi	Maugré tous sainz et maugré dieu ausi	Third Crusade	2
Le Chastelain de Couci	A vous, amant, plus qu'a nul autre gent	Third Crusade	13
Le Chastelain de Couci	Li nouviauz tanz et mais et violete	Third Crusade	15
Guiot de Dijon	Chanterai pour mon corage	Third Crusade	6
Maistres Renas	Pour lou peuple resconforteir	Third Crusade	1
anonymous	Parti de mal et a bien aturné	Third Crusade	1
anonymous	Vos qui ameis de vraie amor	Third Crusade	2
Le Châtelain d'Arras	Aler m'estuet le u je trairai pain	Fourth Crusade (1202–1204)	5
Hugues IV de Berzé	S'onques nus hom por dure departie	Fourth Crusade	15
Hugues IV de Berzé	Bernarz, di moi Fouquet, qu'on tient a sage	Fifth Crusade (1217–1221)	2
Huon de Saint-Quentin	Jerusalem se plaint et li païs	Fifth Crusade	3
Chardon de Croisilles	Li departirs de la douce contree	Barons' Crusade (1239–1241)	5
Philippe de Nanteuil	En chantant veil mon duel faire	Barons' Crusade	5
Theobald I of Navarre	Au tans plain de felonie	Barons' Crusade	7
Theobald I of Navarre	Dame, einsi est qu'il m'en couvient aler	Barons' Crusade	8
Theobald I of Navarre	Li douz penser et li douz souvenir	Barons' Crusade	8
Theobald I of Navarre	Seignor, saichiés qi or ne s'en ira	Barons' Crusade	8
anonymous	Ne chant pas, que que nus die	Barons' Crusade	3
anonymous	Nus ne porroit de mauvese reson	Seventh Crusade (1248–1254)	2
anonymous	Tous li mons doit mener joie	Seventh Crusade	1
anonymous	Un serventois, plait de deduit, de joie	Seventh Crusade	1
anonymous	Douce dame, cui j'aim en bone foi	unknown	1
anonymous	Jerusalem, grant domage me fais	unknown	1
anonymous	Novele amors s'est dedanz mon cuer mise	unknown	2
anonymous	Oiés, seigneur, pereceus par oiseuse	unknown	1
anonymous	Pour joie avoir perfite en paradis	unknown	1

== German crusade songs ==
The following Minnesänger are known to have composed crusade songs:

- Walther von der Vogelweide: Palästinalied, Elegy
- Tannhäuser: Kreuzlied
- Friedrich von Hausen
- Albrecht von Johansdorf
- Heinrich von Rugge
- Hartmann von Aue
- Freidank: Akkonsprüche
- Neidhart

== Castilian crusade songs ==
Only one vernacular crusade song is known from the Iberian Peninsula. Discovered in the second half of the twentieth century, Ay, Jherusalem! is a planto or lament in Castilian. It is recruitment propaganda probably connected either with the First Council of Lyon in 1245 or the Second Council of Lyon in 1274. The anonymous poet laments the plight of the Christians and the cruelty of the Muslims. In form, it consists of stanzas of five lines (two dodecasyllables and three hexasyllables) with the last line always ending in the refrain (estribillo) "Iherusalem".

== Bibliography ==
- Barbieri, Luca (2018). "Crusade Songs and the Old French Literary Canon". In Simon Thomas Parsons; Linda M. Paterson (eds.). Literature of the Crusades. D. S. Brewer. pp. 75–95.
- Cammarota, Maria Grazia. "Tannhäuser's Crusade Song: A Rewriting of Walther's Elegy?". In M. Buzzoni and M. Bampi (eds.), The Garden of Crossing Paths: The Manipulation and Rewriting of Medieval Texts. Venice: Libreria Editrice Cafoscarina, 2005. pp. 95–118.
- Choin, Victoria. The Poets, the Popes, and the Chroniclers: Comparing Crusade Rhetoric in the Songs of the Troubadours and Trouvéres with Crusade Literature, 1145–1291. Master's thesis. Arizona State University, 2019.
- Dijkstra, Cathrynke (1995). La chanson de croisade: étude thématique d'un genre hybride. Amsterdam: Schiphouwer en Brinkman.
- Franchini, Enzo (2007). "¡Ay, Iherusalem!: Ediciones paleográfica y experimental". Incipit. 27: 69–111.
- Jordan, W. C. (1998). « Amen ! » Cinq fois « Amen ! ». Les chansons de la croisade égyptienne de Saint Louis, une source négligée d'opinion royaliste Médiévales 34: 79–90 .
- Lewent, Kurt (1905). "Das altprovenzalische Kreuzlied." Romanische Forschungen, 21(2):321–448.
- Paterson, Linda M. (2003). "Lyric allusions to the crusades and the Holy Land." Colston Symposium.
- Paterson, Linda M. "Occitan Literature and the Holy Land." The World of Eleanor of Aquitaine: Literature and Society in Southern France between the Eleventh and Twelfth Centuries, edd. Marcus Bull and Catherine Léglu. Woodbridge: Boydell Press, 2005. ISBN 1-84383-114-7.
- Paterson, Linda (2018). Singing the Crusades. French and Occitan Responses to the Crusading Movements, 1137–1336. Cambridge: D. S. Brewer.
- Routledge, Michael (2001). "Songs". The Oxford Illustrated History of the Crusades, ed. Jonathan Riley-Smith. Oxford: Oxford University Press. ISBN 0-19-285428-3.
- Schreiner, Elisabeth (2006). "Spanish and Portuguese Literature". In Alan V. Murray (ed.). The Crusades: An Encyclopedia. Vol. 4. ABC-CLIO. pp. 1118–1120.
- Smith, Caroline. Crusading in the Age of Joinville. Routledge, 2016.
