= Mahound =

Muhammad portrayed as a demon

Mahound and Mahoun are variant forms of the name "Muhammad", often found in medieval and later European literature. The name has been used in the past by Christian writers to vilify the Islamic prophet Muhammad. It was especially connected to the demonization of Muhammad as inspiring a false religion.

== Pejorative connotations ==
According to Bernard Lewis, the development of the concept started with a demonization followed by pagans. In the late medieval and early modern period around the Reformation, Muhammad was accused by Christians of being a cunning imposter.

A similar belief was the claim that the Knights Templar worshipped an idol called "Baphomet", which was attached to the generic transliteration of the Muslim name "Mahomet" (itself, a version of "Muhammad", still used in French).

== In literature ==
The name appears in various medieval mystery plays, in which Mahound is sometimes portrayed as a generic demon worshipped by villains such as Herod and the Pharaoh of the Exodus. One play depicts both Herod the Great and his son Herod Antipas as worshipping Mahound, while in another play Pharaoh encourages the Egyptians to pursue the Israelites into the Red Sea with the words: Heave up your hearts ay to Mahound.

In Scottish popular culture, the variant form "Mahoun" was also used as the name of the devil, who was called Old Mahoun. Robert Burns wrote:

The Deil cam fiddlin thro' the town,
And danc'd awa wi' th'Exciseman;
And ilka wife cries auld Mahoun,
I wish you luck o' the prize, man.Robert Burns, [The Deil's Awa Wi' Th' Exciseman]

G. K. Chesterton uses "Mahound" rather than "Mohammed" in his poem Lepanto. More recently, Salman Rushdie, in his novel The Satanic Verses, chose the name Mahound to refer to Muhammad as he appears in one character's dreams. In reference to the Burns' poem, the novel Child of the Moon features a character named "Mahoun" who is responsible for seducing others into satanic rituals.

== See also ==
- Mohammedan
- Termagant
