= Guiot de Dijon =

Burgundian trouvère

Guiot de Dijon (French: [ɡɥijo də diʒɔ̃]; fl. 1215–25) was a Burgundian trouvère. The seventeen chansons ascribed to him in the standard listing of Raynaud-Spanke are found in fifteen chansonniers, some without attribution or with conflicting attributions where they occur in multiple sources.

Of Guiot's life, little is known. His name suggests he was from Dijon. The mention of three names in two songs gives further indication of his milieu: an envoi naming 'Erard a Chassenay' has been assumed to refer to one of the three individuals called Érart who were barons of Chassenay in Champagne.

Several Guiot's songs survive with more than one distinct melody. The version of Quant je plus voi felon rire in the Chansonnier du roi, the melody of which was added later, is unusual in being through-composed and in Franconian notation. Overall, Guiot's melodies are usually identified as those appearing in bar form, which all end on the same pitch class.

Guiot probably modelled Chanter m'estuet, coment que me destraigne (RS117) after the Occitan song Si be·m sui loing et entre gent estraigna by the troubadour Peirol, although this is based on assumptions from shared versification and cannot be confirmed, since no melody survives for RS117. The song Penser ne doit vilanie (RS1240), sometimes attributed to him, served as a model for the anonymous Marian song De penser a vilanie (RS1239), which survives uniquely in the Chansonnier Clairambault, i.e. TrouvX.

== List of songs ==
The list below gives all the songs listed for Guiot de Dijon in the catalogue of Raynaud-Spanke with their number in that catalogue. The listing includes those with attributions to Guiot, which are certainly by someone else (e.g. RS110) and those with conflicting attributions, whose authorship is unresolved by modern scholars.

- A l'entree del dous comencement (RS647). Ascribed in the Berne Chansonnier but ascribed to Jocelin de Dijon in the Chansonnier du roi, where the melody was entered later.
- Amours m'a si enseignié (RS1088). Ascribed in the Chansonnier du roi and Chansonnier de Noailles but the Berne Chansonnier ascribes it to Gilles de Viés Maisons.
- Bien doi chanter quant fine Amour m'enseigne (RS561). Ascribed in the Berne Chansonnier. No music survives.
- Chanter m'estuet, coment que me destraigne (RS117). Ascribed in the Berne Chansonnier.
- Chanter m'estuet pour la plus bele (RS589). Ascribed in the Berne Chansonnier. No music survives
- Chanterai por mon corage (RS21). The 'je' of this song is a woman, yearning for her crusader lover. It is ascribed to Guiot in the Chansonnier du roi but the Berne chansonnier ascribes it to 'Dame de Flayel'.
- Cuers desirous apaie (RS110). Ascribed to Guiot in the Berne Chansonnier, but accepted as being by Blondel de Nesle who is ascribed the song in other sources.
- De moi douloureus vos chant (RS317). Ascribed to Gillebert de Berneville in the Chansonnier de Noailles.
- Desoremais est raison (RS1885). Ascribed to Guiot only in the Chansonnier du roi where an older rubric and the index ascribe the song to Jehan de Nuevile; the Berne chansonnier ascribes it to Raoul de Soissons.
- Helas, qu'ai forfait a la gent (RS681). Ascribed in the Chansonnier du roi.
- Joie ne guerredon d'amours (RS2020). Attributed in the Chansonnier du roi but given two different ascriptions in two other sources.
- Li dous tens noviaus qui revient (RS1246). Ascribed in the Chansonnier du roi. No music survives.
- Penser ne doit vilanie (RS1240). Attributed in the Chansonnier du roi but given two different ascriptions in two other sources.
- Quant je plus voi felon rire (RS1503). Ascribed in the Chansonnier du roi and Chansonnier de Noailles but the Berne Chansonnier ascribes it to Amauri du Craon.
- Quant li dous estés define (RS1388). Attributed in the Chansonnier du roi but given two different ascriptions in two other sources.
- Quant voi la flor botoner (RS771). Unicum in the Chansonnier du roi ascribed in situ there but to Jehan de Nuevile in the index. No melody survives (empty staves in the MS).
- Uns maus k'ainc mes ne senti (RS1079). Ascribed in the Chansonnier du roi but the Chansonnier de Noailles ascribes it to one 'Gontier'.
