= Baphomet =

Deity and symbol in the occult traditions

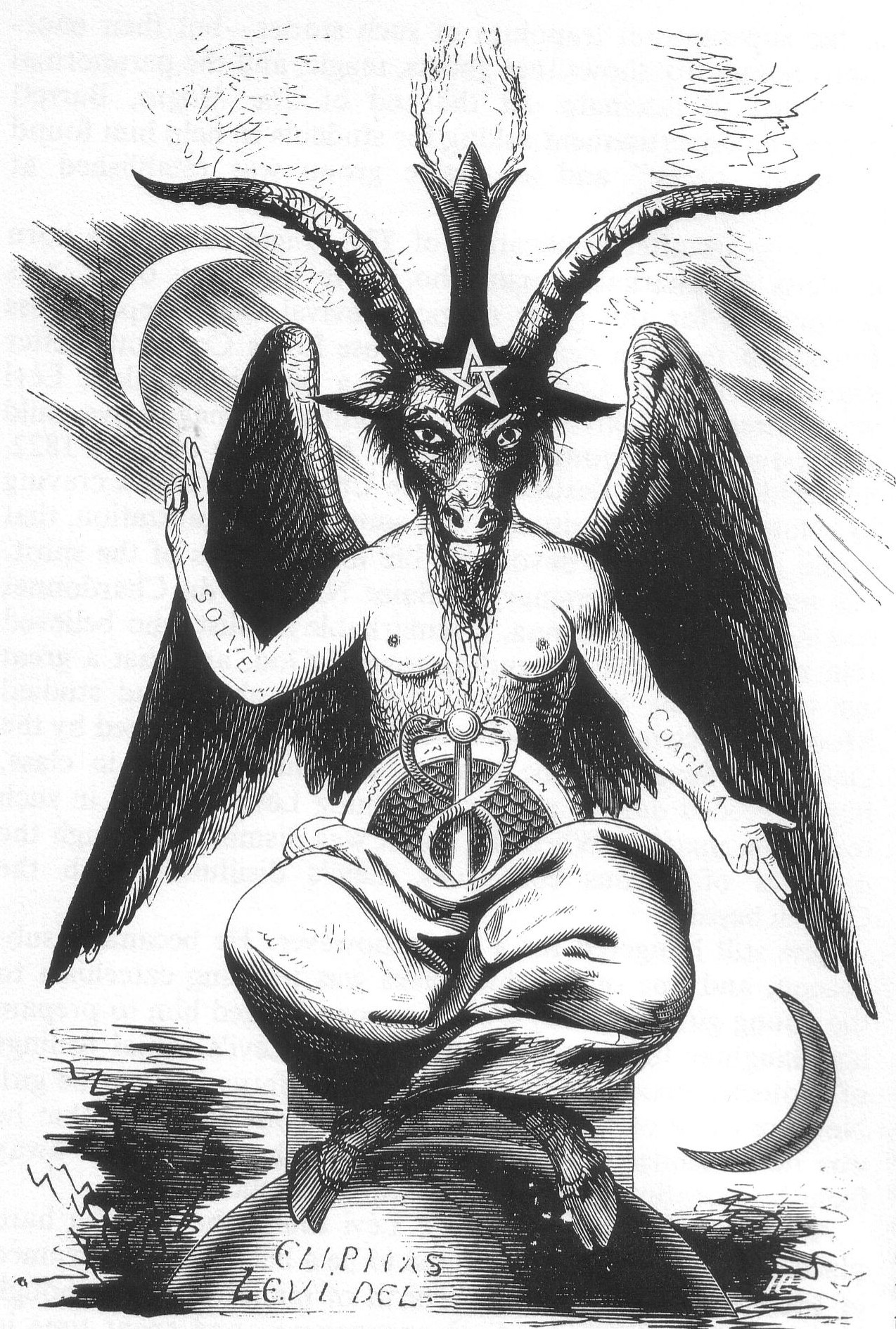
An 1856 depiction of the Sabbatic Goat from Dogme et Rituel de la Haute Magie by Éliphas Lévi. The arms bear the Latin words SOLVE (dissolve) and COAGULA (coagulate), reflecting the spiritual alchemy of Lévi's work.

Baphomet is a figure rooted within the occult and Western esoteric traditions. The name first emerged in the 14th century during the Trials of the Knights Templar, when the order was accused of heresy for worshipping Baphomet as a demonic idol. Baphomet was reimagined by 19th century occultists amidst renewed debate over the suppression of the Templars.

The modern popular image of Baphomet was established by Éliphas Lévi in his 1856 work Dogme et Rituel de la Haute Magie. His Sabbatic Goat illustration depicts a winged, androgynous human-goat hybrid, a deliberate synthesis of binary opposites designed to represent the concept of perfect equilibrium. This Baphomet is a recurring symbol of occultism, widely adapted to represent the reconciliation of opposites, esoteric knowledge, and the summation of the universe.

== History ==
The name Baphomet appeared in July 1098 in a letter about the siege of Antioch by the French Crusader Anselm of Ribemont:

Sequenti die aurora apparente, altis vocibus Baphometh invocaverunt; et nos Deum nostrum in cordibus nostris deprecantes, impetum facientes in eos, de muris civitatis omnes expulimus.

Translation:

As the next day dawned, they [i.e. the inhabitants of Antioch] called loudly upon Baphometh; and we prayed silently in our hearts to God, then we attacked and forced all of them outside the city walls.

Raymond of Aguilers, a chronicler of the First Crusade, reports that the troubadours used the term Bafomet for Muhammad, and Bafumaria for a mosque. The name Bafometz later appeared around 1195 in the Provençal poems Senhors, per los nostres peccatz by the troubadour Gavaudan. Around 1250, a Provençal poem by Austorc d'Aorlhac bewailing the defeat of the Seventh Crusade again uses the name Bafomet for Muhammad. De Bafomet is also the title of one of four surviving chapters of an Occitan translation of Ramon Llull's earliest known work, the Libre de la doctrina pueril.

Baphomet was allegedly worshipped as a deity by the medieval order of the Knights Templar. King Philip IV of France had many French Templars simultaneously arrested, and then tortured into confessions in October 1307. The name Baphomet appeared in trial transcripts for the Inquisition of the Knights Templar that same year. Over 100 different charges had been leveled against the Templars, including heresy, homosexual relations, spitting and urinating on the cross, and sodomy. Most of them were dubious, as they were the same charges that were leveled against the Cathars and many of King Philip's enemies; he had earlier kidnapped Pope Boniface VIII and charged him with nearly identical offenses. Yet Malcolm Barber observes that historians "find it difficult to accept that an affair of such enormity rests upon total fabrication". The "Chinon Parchment suggests that the Templars did indeed spit on the cross", says Sean Martin, and that these acts were intended to simulate the kind of humiliation and torture that a Crusader might be subjected to if captured by the Saracens, where they were taught how to commit apostasy "with the mind only and not with the heart". Similarly, Michael Haag suggests that the simulated worship of Baphomet did indeed form part of a Templar initiation rite:

The indictment (acte d'accusation) published by the court of Rome set forth ... "that in all the provinces they had idols, that is to say, heads, some of which had three faces, others but one; sometimes, it was a human skull ... That in their assemblies, and especially in their grand chapters, they worshipped the idol as a god, as their saviour, saying that this head could save them, that it bestowed on the order all its wealth, made the trees flower, and the plants of the earth to sprout forth."

— Jules Michelet, History of France (1860)

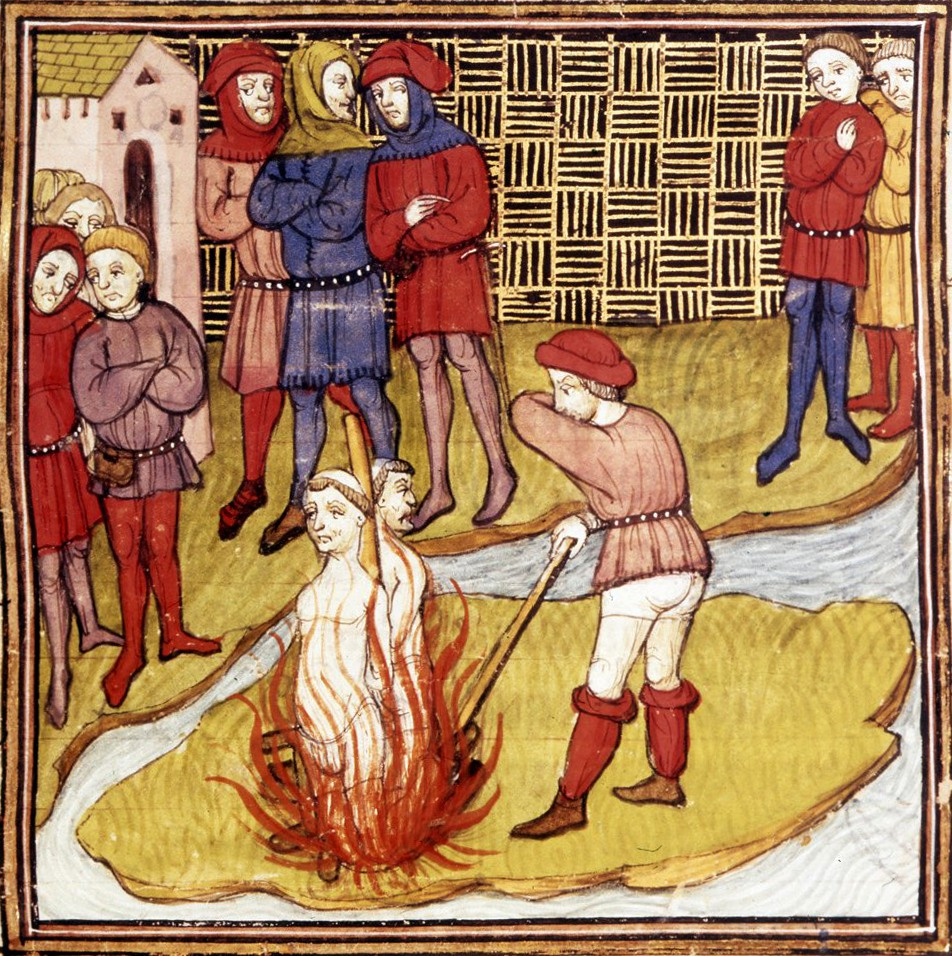
Two Templars burned at the stake; illustration from a 15th–century French manuscript

The name Baphomet comes up in several of these dubious confessions. Peter Partner states in his 1987 book The Knights Templar and their Myth: "In the trial of the Templars one of their main charges was their supposed worship of a heathen idol-head known as a Baphomet (Baphomet = Mahomet)." The description of the object changed from confession to confession; some Templars denied any knowledge of it, while others, who confessed under torture, described it as being either a severed head, a cat, or a head with three faces. The Templars did possess several silver-gilt heads as reliquaries, including one marked capud lviii^{m}, another said to be St. Euphemia, and possibly the actual head of Hugues de Payens. The claims of an idol named Baphomet were unique to the Inquisition of the Templars. Karen Ralls, author of the Knights Templar Encyclopedia, argues that it is significant that "no specific evidence [of Baphomet] appears in either the Templar Rule or in other medieval period Templar documents."

Gauserand de Montpesant, a knight of Provence, said that their superior showed him an idol made in the form of Baffomet; another, named Raymond Rubei, described it as a wooden head, on which the figure of Baphomet was painted, and adds, "that he worshipped it by kissing its feet, and exclaiming, 'Yalla', which was", he says, "verbum Saracenorum", a word taken from the Saracens. A templar of Florence declared that, in the secret chapters of the order, one brother said to the other, showing the idol, "Adore this head—this head is your god and your Mahomet."

— Thomas Wright, The Worship of the Generative Powers (1865)

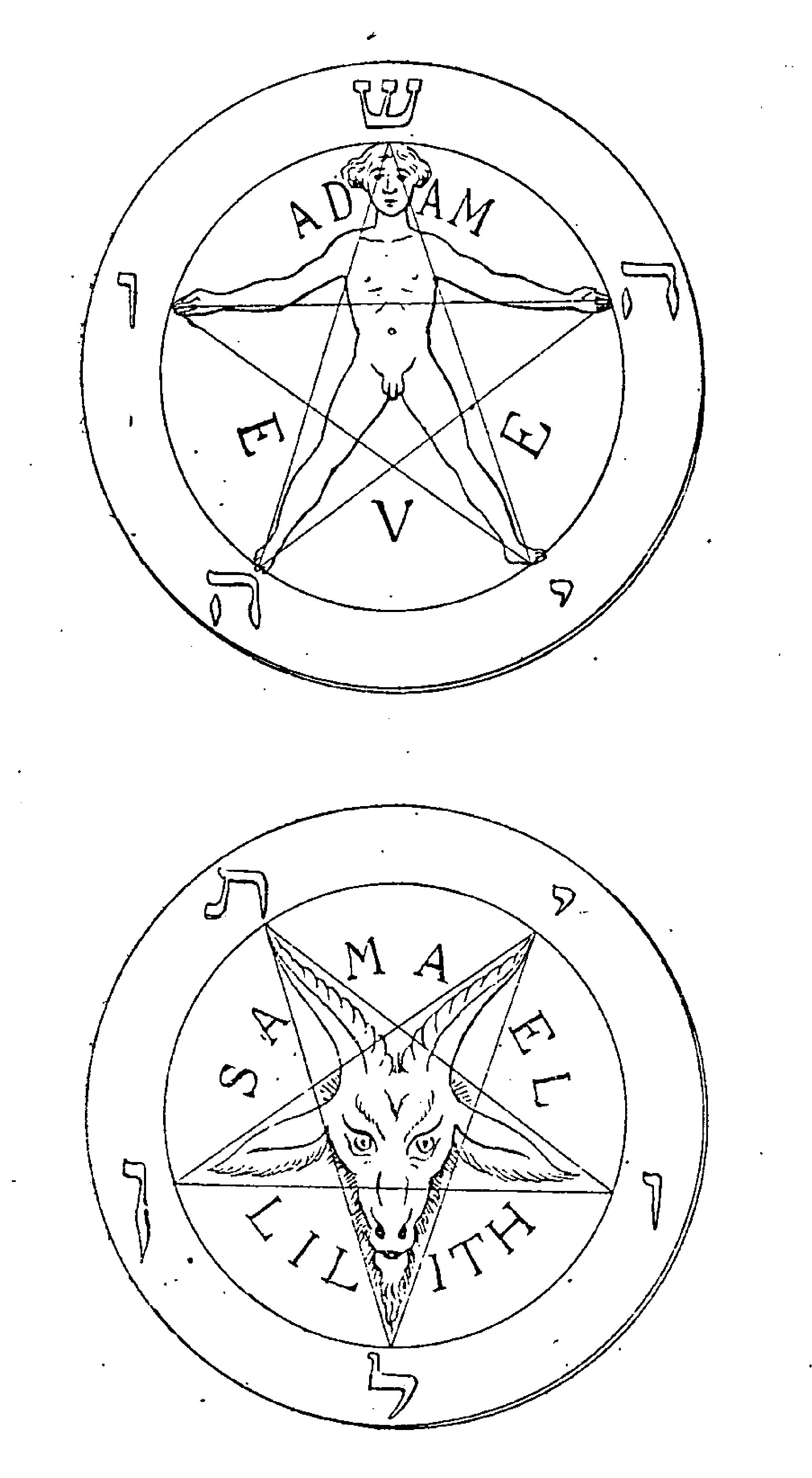
Drawings of upright and inverted pentagrams representing Spirit over matter (holiness) and matter over Spirit (evil), respectively, from La Clef de la magie noire (1897) by French occultist Stanislas de Guaita. Note the names Adam, Eve, Samael, and Lilith.

The name Baphomet came into popular English usage in the 19th century during debate and speculation on the reasons for the suppression of the Templars. Modern scholars agree that the name of Baphomet was an Old French corruption of the name "Mohammed", with the interpretation being that some of the Templars, through their long military occupation of the Outremer, had begun incorporating Islamic ideas into their belief system, and that this was seen and documented by the Inquisitors as heresy. Alain Demurger, however, rejects the idea that the Templars could have adopted the doctrines of their enemies. Helen Nicholson writes that the charges were essentially "manipulative"—the Templars "were accused of becoming fairy-tale Muslims". Medieval Christians believed that Muslims were idolatrous and worshipped Muhammad as a god, with mahomet becoming mammet in English, meaning an idol or false god (see also Medieval Christian views on Muhammad). This idol-worship is attributed to Muslims in several chansons de geste. For example, one finds the gods Bafum e Travagan in a Provençal poem on the life of St. Honorat, completed in 1300. In the Chanson de Simon Pouille, written before 1235, a Saracen idol is called Bafumetz.

== Alternative etymologies ==
While modern scholars and the Oxford English Dictionary state that the origin of the name Baphomet was a probable Old French version of "Mahomet", alternative etymologies have also been proposed.

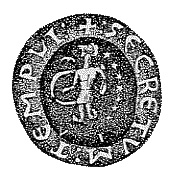
Knights Templar seal representing the Gnostic figure Abraxas

In the 18th century, speculative theories arose that sought to tie the Knights Templar with the origins of Freemasonry. Bookseller, Freemason and Illuminatus Christoph Friedrich Nicolai (1733–1811), in Versuch über die Beschuldigungen welche dem Tempelherrenorden gemacht worden, und über dessen Geheimniß (1782), was the first to claim that the Templars were Gnostics, and that "Baphomet" was formed from the Greek words βαφη μητȣς, baphe metous, to mean Taufe der Weisheit, "Baptism of Wisdom". Nicolai "attached to it the idea of the image of the supreme God, in the state of quietude attributed to him by the Manichaean Gnostics", according to F. J. M. Raynouard, and "supposed that the Templars had a secret doctrine and initiations of several grades", which "the Saracens had communicated ... to them". He further connected the figura Baffometi with the Pythagorean pentacle:

What properly was the sign of the Baffomet, "figura Baffometi", which was depicted on the breast of the bust representing the Creator, cannot be exactly determined ... I believe it to have been the Pythagorean pentagon (Fünfeck) of health and prosperity: ... It is well known how holy this figure was considered, and that the Gnostics had much in common with the Pythagoreans. From the prayers which the soul shall recite, according to the diagram of the Ophite-worshippers, when they on their return to God are stopped by the Archons, and their purity has to be examined, it appears that these serpent-worshippers believed they must produce a token that they had been clean on earth. I believe that this token was also the holy pentagon, the sign of their initiation (τελειας βαφης μετεος).

— "Symbols and Symbolism" in Freemasons' Quarterly Magazine, 1854

Émile Littré (1801–1881) in Dictionnaire de la langue francaise asserted that the word was cabalistically formed by writing backward tem. o. h. p. ab, an abbreviation of templi omnium hominum pacis abbas, "abbot, or father of the temple of peace of all men". His source is the "Abbé Constant", which is to say, Alphonse-Louis Constant, the real name of Eliphas Lévi.

Hugh J. Schonfield (1901–1988), one of the scholars who worked on the Dead Sea Scrolls, argued in his book The Essene Odyssey that the word "Baphomet" was created with knowledge of the Atbash substitution cipher, which substitutes the first letter of the Hebrew alphabet for the last, the second for the second last, and so on. "Baphomet" rendered in Hebrew is בפומת (bpwmt); interpreted using Atbash, it becomes שופיא (šwpy‘, "Shofya'"), which can be interpreted as the Greek word Sophia, meaning "wisdom". This theory appears as an important plot point in the novel The Da Vinci Code, although it was recently questioned by the French historian Thierry Murcia, who challenges the method of calculation used by Schonfield.

== Joseph Freiherr von Hammer-Purgstall ==
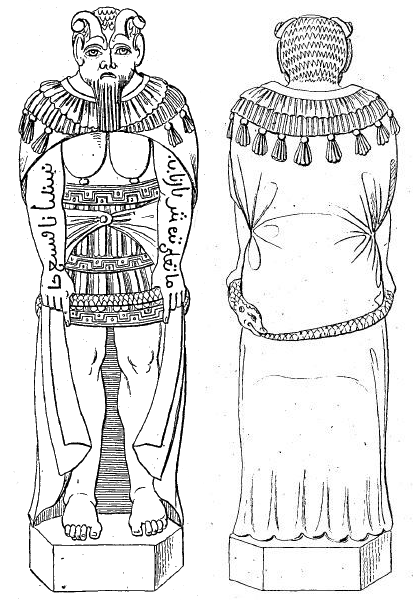
Joseph von Hammer-Purgstall (1774–1856) associated a series of carved or engraved figures found on a number of supposed 13th-century Templar artifacts (such as cups, bowls and coffers) with the Baphometic idol.

In 1818, the name and concept of Baphomet appeared in an essay by the Viennese Orientalist Joseph Freiherr von Hammer-Purgstall: Mysterium Baphometis revelatum, seu Fratres Militiæ Templi, qua Gnostici et quidem Ophiani, Apostasiæ, Idoloduliæ et Impuritatis convicti, per ipsa eorum Monumenta (translated: "Discovery of the Mystery of Baphomet, by which the Knights Templars, like the Gnostics and Ophites, are convicted of Apostasy, of Idolatry and of moral Impurity, by their own Monuments"),

The essay which presented an elaborate and controversial attempt to discredit Templarist Masonry and, by extension, Freemasonry in general, by linking them to gnosticism.

Following Nicolai, Hammer-Purgsal argued, using as archaeological evidence "Baphomets" faked by earlier scholars and literary evidence such as the Grail romances, that the Templars were Gnostics and the "Templars' head" was a Gnostic idol called Baphomet. One commentary on Hammer-Purgsal stated:

His chief subject is the images which are called Baphomet ... found in several museums and collections of antiquities, as in Weimar ... and in the imperial cabinet in Vienna. These little images are of stone, partly hermaphrodites, having, generally, two heads or two faces, with a beard, but, in other respects, female figures, most of them accompanied by serpents, the sun and moon, and other strange emblems, and bearing many inscriptions, mostly in Arabic ... The inscriptions he reduces almost all to Mete[, which] ... is, according to him, not the Μητις of the Greeks, but the Sophia, Achamot Prunikos of the Ophites, which was represented half man, half woman, as the symbol of wisdom, unnatural voluptuousness and the principle of sensuality ... He asserts that those small figures are such as the Templars, according to the statement of a witness, carried with them in their coffers. Baphomet signifies Βαφη Μητεος, baptism of Metis, baptism of fire, or the Gnostic baptism, an enlightening of the mind, which, however, was interpreted by the Ophites, in an obscene sense, as fleshly union ... the fundamental assertion, that those idols and cups came from the Templars, has been considered as unfounded, especially as the images known to have existed among the Templars seem rather to be images of saints.

— "Baphomet" in Encyclopedia Americana, 1851

Hammer's essay did not pass unchallenged, and F. J. M. Raynouard published an Étude sur 'Mysterium Baphometi revelatum' in Journal des savants the following year. Charles William King criticized Hammer, saying they had been deceived by "the paraphernalia of ... Rosicrucian or alchemical quacks", and Peter Partner agreed that the images "may have been forgeries from the occultist workshops". At the very least, there was little evidence to tie these items to the Knights Templar—in the 19th century some European museums acquired such pseudo-Egyptian objects, which were cataloged as "Baphomets" and credulously thought to have been idols of the Templars.

== Éliphas Lévi ==
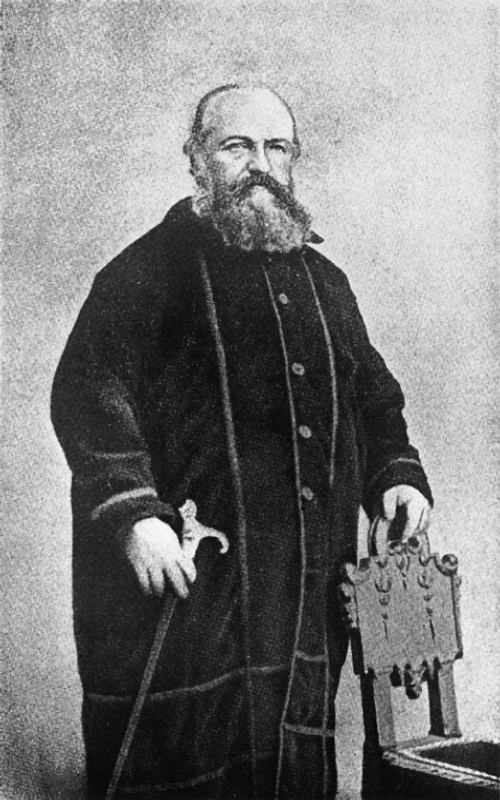
Éliphas Lévi

Later in the 19th century, the name of Baphomet became further associated with the occult. Éliphas Lévi published Dogme et Rituel de la Haute Magie (Dogma and Rituals of High Magic) as two volumes (Dogme 1854, Rituel 1856), in which he included an image he had drawn himself, which he described as Baphomet and "The Sabbatic Goat", showing a winged humanoid goat with a pair of breasts and a torch on its head between its horns (see the illustration). This image has become the best-known representation of Baphomet. Lévi considered the Baphomet to be a depiction of the absolute in symbolic form and explicated in detail his symbolism in the drawing that served as the frontispiece:

The goat on the frontispiece carries the sign of the pentagram on the forehead, with one point at the top, a symbol of light, his two hands forming the sign of occultism, the one pointing up to the white moon of Chesed, the other pointing down to the black one of Geburah. This sign expresses the perfect harmony of mercy with justice. His one arm is female, the other male like the ones of the androgyne of Khunrath, the attributes of which we had to unite with those of our goat because he is one and the same symbol. The flame of intelligence shining between his horns is the magic light of the universal balance, the image of the soul elevated above matter, as the flame, whilst being tied to matter, shines above it. The beast's head expresses the horror of the sinner, whose materially acting, solely responsible part has to bear the punishment exclusively; the soul is insensitive according to its nature and can only suffer when it materializes. The rod standing instead of genitals symbolizes eternal life, the body covered with scales: the water, the semi-circle above it: the atmosphere, the feathers following above: the volatile. Humanity is represented by the two breasts and the androgyne arms of this sphinx of the occult sciences.

— Éliphas Lévi, Dogme et rituel de la haute magie

=== Witches' Sabbath ===
Lévi's depiction of Baphomet is similar to that of The Devil in the early Tarot. Lévi, working with correspondences different from those later used by S. L. MacGregor Mathers, "equated the Devil Tarot key with Mercury", giving "his figure Mercury's caduceus, rising like a phallus from his groin". The symbol is said to have originated when Mercury / Hermes once attempted to stop a fight between two snakes by throwing his rod at them, whereupon they twined themselves around the rod. The word Caduceus is from the Greek root meaning "herald's wand" and was also a badge of diplomatic ambassadors and became associated with commerce, eloquence, alchemy, thievery, and lying. The etymology of Caduceus is from Doric Greek κᾱρύκειον karukeion, from the Greek κῆρυξ kērux meaning "herald".

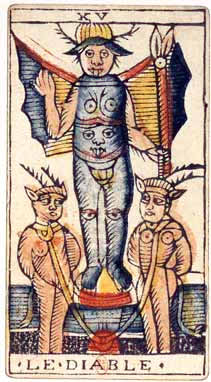
Le Diable, from the early 18th-century Tarot of Marseilles by Jean Dodal

Lévi believed that the alleged devil worship of the medieval Witches' Sabbath was a perpetuation of ancient pagan rites. A goat with a candle between its horns appears in medieval witchcraft records, and other pieces of lore are cited in Dogme et Rituel:

Below this figure we read a frank and simple inscription—THE DEVIL. Yes, we confront here that phantom of all terrors, the dragon of all theogonies, the Ahriman of the Persians, the Typhon of the Egyptians, the Python of the Greeks, the old serpent of the Hebrews, the fantastic monster, the nightmare, the Croquemitaine, the gargoyle, the great beast of the Middle Ages, and—worse than all these—the Baphomet of the Templars, the bearded idol of the alchemist, the obscene deity of Mendes, the goat of the Sabbath. The frontispiece to this 'Ritual' reproduces the exact figure of the terrible emperor of night, with all his attributes and all his characters ... Yes, in our profound conviction, the Grand Masters of the Order of Templars worshipped the Baphomet, and caused it to be worshipped by their initiates; yes, there existed in the past, and there may be still in the present, assemblies which are presided over by this figure, seated on a throne and having a flaming torch between the horns. But the adorers of this sign do not consider, as do we, that it is a representation of the devil; on the contrary, for them it is that of the god Pan, the god of our modern schools of philosophy, the god of the Alexandrian theurgic school and of our own mystical Neoplatonists, the god of Lamartine and Victor Cousin, the god of Spinoza and Plato, the god of the primitive Gnostic schools; the Christ also of the dissident priesthood ... The mysteries of the Sabbath have been variously described, but they figure always in grimoires and in magical trials; the revelations made on the subject may be classified under three heads—1. those referring to a fantastic and imaginary Sabbath; 2. those which betray the secrets of the occult assemblies of veritable adepts; 3. revelations of foolish and criminal gatherings, having for their object the operations of black magic.

— Lévi, "The Sabbath of the Sorcerers"

Lévi's Baphomet may have been partly inspired by grotesque carvings on the Templar churches of Lanleff in Brittany and Saint-Merri in Paris, which depict squatting bearded men with bat wings, female breasts, horns and the shaggy hindquarters of a beast.

=== Socialism, romanticism, and magnetism ===
Lévi's references to the School of Alexandria and the Templars can be explained against the background of debates about the origins and character of true Christianity. It has been pointed out that these debates included contemporary forms of Romantic socialism, or Utopian socialism, which were seen as the heirs of the Gnostics, Templars, and other mystics. Lévi, being himself an adherent of these schools since the 1840s, regarded the socialists and Romantics (such as Alphonse de Lamartine) as the successors of this alleged tradition of true religion. In fact, his narrative mirrors historiographies of socialism, including the Histoire des Montagnards (1847) by his best friend and political comrade Alphonse Esquiros. Consequently, the Baphomet is depicted by Lévi as the symbol of a revolutionary heretical tradition that would soon lead to the "emancipation of humanity" and the establishment of a perfect social order.

In Lévi's writings, the Baphomet does not only express a historical-political tradition, but also occult natural forces that are explained by his magical theory of the Astral Light. He developed this notion in the context of what has been called "spiritualist magnetism": theories that stressed the religious implications of magnetism. Often, their representatives were socialists that believed in the social consequences of a "synthesis" of religion and science that was to be achieved by the means of magnetism. Spiritualist magnetists with a socialist background include the Baron du Potet and Henri Delaage, who served as main sources for Lévi. At the same time, Lévi polemicized against famed Catholic authors such as Jules-Eudes de Mirville and Roger Gougenot des Mousseaux, who regarded magnetism as the workings of demons and other infernal powers. The paragraph just before the passage cited in the previous section has to be seen against this background:

Let us state now for the edification of the vulgar, for the satisfaction of M. le Comte de Mirville, for the justification of the demonologist Bodin, for the greater glory of the Church, which persecuted Templars, burnt magicians, excommunicated Freemasons, &c. let us state boldly and precisely that all the inferior initiates of the occult sciences and profaners of the great arcanum, not only did in the past, but do now, and will ever, adore what is signified by this alarming symbol.

=== Goat of Mendes ===
The Egyptian god Khnum (Upper Egypt) was usually depicted with the head of a spiral-horned ram

The Egyptian god Banebdjedet (Lower Egypt) was sometimes depicted with four ram heads.

Mendes is the Greek name for the ancient Egyptian city of Djedet. Lévi equates his image with "The Goat of Mendes", possibly following the account by Herodotus that the god of Mendes was depicted with a goat's face and legs. Herodotus relates how all male goats were held in great reverence by the Mendesians, and how in his time a woman publicly copulated with a goat. The chief deities of Mendes were the ram deity Banebdjedet (lit. Ba of the Lord of Djedet), who was the Ba of Osiris, and his consort, the fish goddess Hatmehit, with both deities being worshipped in Lower Egypt. Khnum was the equivalent god in Upper Egypt.

Khnum was typically portrayed with the horns of a ram, one of the sacred animals worshiped in Ancient Egypt, representing aspects such as fertility, rebirth, regeneration, and resurrection. He was originally illustrated with horizontally spiraled horns (based on the Ancient Egyptian corkscrew-horned sheep, an extinct subspecies of the barbary sheep), but his representation later evolved to feature the down-turned horns of Ammon in the New Kingdom (based on the extinct sheep subspecies Ovis platyra palaeoaegyptiacus).

E. A. Wallis Budge writes:

At several places in the Delta, e.g. Hermopolis, Lycopolis, and Mendes, the god Pan and a goat were worshipped; Strabo, quoting (xvii. 1, 19) Pindar, says that in these places goats had intercourse with women, and Herodotus (ii. 46) instances a case which was said to have taken place in the open day. The Mendisians, according to this last writer, paid reverence to all goats, and more to the males than to the females, and particularly to one he-goat, on the death of which public mourning is observed throughout the whole Mendesian district; they call both Pan and the goat Mendes, and both were worshipped as gods of generation and fecundity. Diodorus compares the cult of the goat of Mendes with that of Priapus, and groups the god with the Pans and the Satyrs.

The link between Baphomet and the pagan god Pan was also observed by Aleister Crowley as well as Anton LaVey:

Many pleasures revered before the advent of Christianity were condemned by the new religion. It required little change-over to transform the horns and cloven hooves of Pan into a most convincing devil! Pan's attributes could neatly be changed into charged-with-punishment sins, and so the metamorphosis was complete.

== Aleister Crowley ==
The Baphomet of Lévi was to become an important figure within the cosmology of Thelema, the mystical system and religion established by Aleister Crowley in the early 20th century. Baphomet features in the Creed of the Gnostic Catholic Church recited by the congregation in The Gnostic Mass, in the sentence: "And I believe in the Serpent and the Lion, Mystery of Mysteries, in His name BAPHOMET."

In Magick (Book 4), Crowley asserted that Baphomet was a divine androgyne and "the hieroglyph of arcane perfection", seen as that which reflects: "What occurs above so reflects below, or As above so below":

The Devil does not exist. It is a false name invented by the Black Brothers to imply a Unity in their ignorant muddle of dispersions. A devil who had unity would be a God... "The Devil" is, historically, the God of any people that one personally dislikes ... This serpent, SATAN, is not the enemy of Man, but He who made Gods of our race, knowing Good and Evil; He bade "Know Thyself!" and taught Initiation. He is "The Devil" of The Book of Thoth, and His emblem is BAPHOMET, the Androgyne who is the hieroglyph of arcane perfection ... He is therefore Life, and Love. But moreover his letter is ayin, the Eye, so that he is Light; and his Zodiacal image is Capricornus, that leaping goat whose attribute is Liberty.

— Magick: Liber ABA, Book Four, Parts I–IV

For Crowley, Baphomet is further a representative of the spiritual nature of the Spermatozoon, while also being symbolic of the "magical child" produced as a result of sex magic. As such, Baphomet represents the Union of Opposites, especially as mystically personified in Chaos and Babalon combined and biologically manifested with the sperm and egg united in the zygote.

Crowley proposed that Baphomet was derived from "Father Mithras". In his Confessions he describes the circumstances that led to this etymology:

I had taken the name Baphomet as my motto in the O.T.O. For six years and more I had tried to discover the proper way to spell this name. I knew that it must have eight letters, and also that the numerical and literal correspondences must be such as to express the meaning of the name in such a way as to confirm what scholarship had found out about it, and also to clear up those problems which archaeologists had so far failed to solve ... One theory of the name is that it represents the words βαφὴ μήτεος, the baptism of wisdom; another, that it is a corruption of a title meaning "Father Mithras". Needless to say, the suffix R supported the latter theory. I added up the word as spelt by the Wizard. It totalled 729. This number had never appeared in my Cabbalistic working and therefore meant nothing to me. It however justified itself as being the cube of nine. The word κηφας, the mystic title given by Christ to Peter as the cornerstone of the Church, has this same value. So far, the Wizard had shown great qualities! He had cleared up the etymological problem and shown why the Templars should have given the name Baphomet to their so-called idol. Baphomet was Father Mithras, the cubical stone which was the corner of the Temple.

== Modern interpretations and usage ==
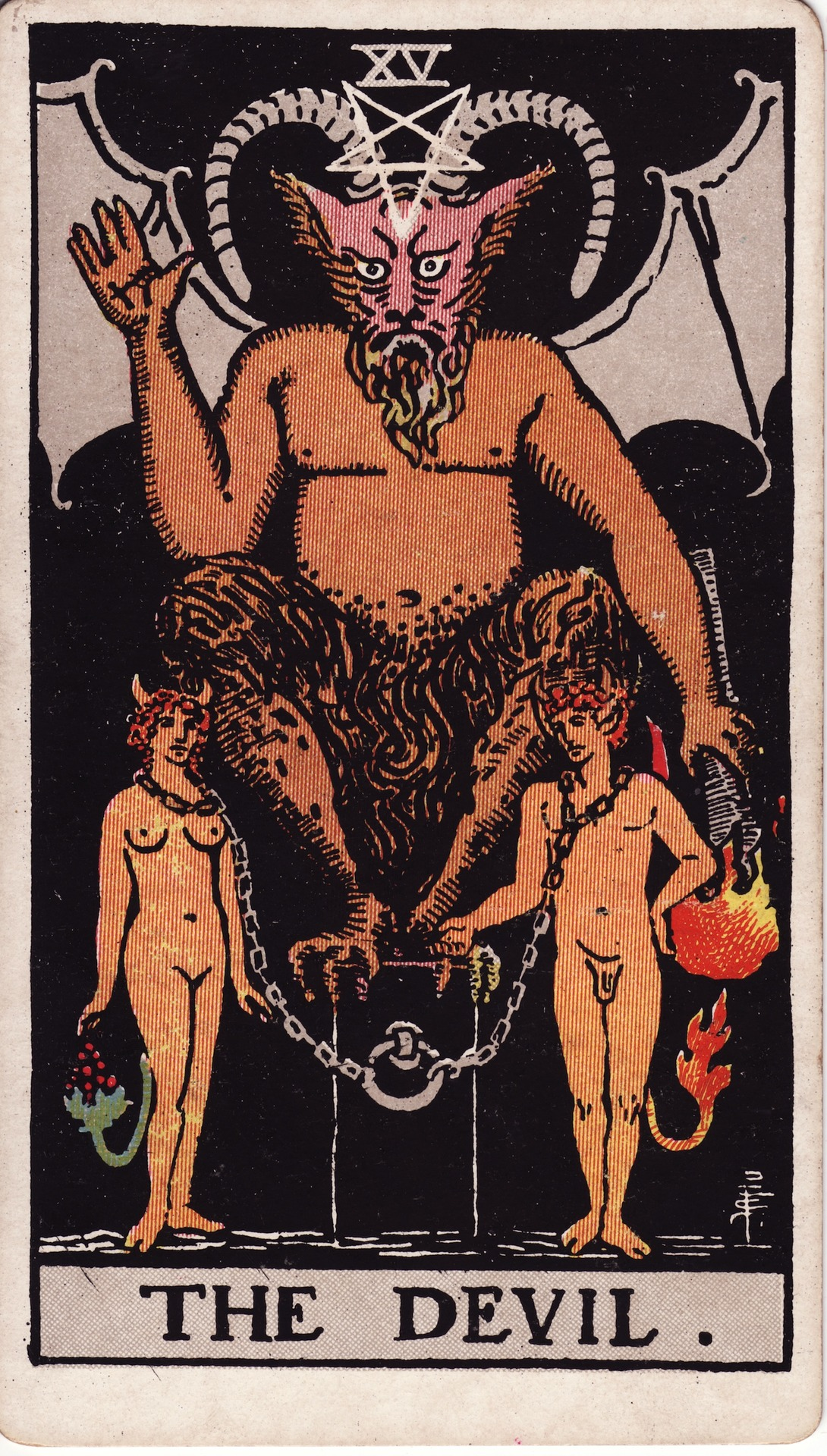
The Devil in the Rider–Waite tarot deck

Lévi's Baphomet is the source of the later tarot image of the Devil in the Rider–Waite design. The concept of a downward-pointing pentagram on its forehead was enlarged upon by Lévi in his discussion (without illustration) of the Goat of Mendes arranged within such a pentagram, which he contrasted with the microcosmic man arranged within a similar but upright pentagram. The actual image of a goat in a downward-pointing pentagram first appeared in the 1897 book La Clef de la Magie Noire, written by the French occultist Stanislas de Guaita. It was this image that was later adopted as the official symbol—called the Sigil of Baphomet—of the Church of Satan, and continues to be used among Satanists.

Baphomet, as Lévi's illustration suggests, has occasionally been portrayed as a synonym of Satan or a demon, a member of the hierarchy of Hell. Baphomet appears in that guise as a character in James Blish's The Day After Judgment. Christian evangelist Jack T. Chick claimed that Baphomet is a demon worshipped by Freemasons, a claim that apparently originated with the Taxil hoax. Lévi's Baphomet was depicted on the cover of Les Mystères de la franc-maçonnerie dévoilés, Léo Taxil's lurid paperback "exposé" of Freemasonry, which, in 1897, he revealed as a hoax intended to ridicule the Catholic Church and its anti-Masonic propaganda.

In 2014, The Satanic Temple commissioned an 8.5 ft (2.6 m) statue of Baphomet to stand alongside a monument of the Ten Commandments at the Oklahoma State Capitol, citing "respect for diversity and religious minorities" as reasons for the monument. (The Oklahoma Supreme Court ultimately declared religious displays illegal.) The Baphomet statue was unveiled in Detroit on 25 July 2015, as a symbol of the modern Satanist movement. The Satanic Temple transported the Baphomet statue to Little Rock, Arkansas, where another 10 Commandments monument had been recently installed; the statue was publicly displayed during a Temple demonstration on 16 August 2018.

=== In popular culture ===
Promotional poster for Léo Taxil's Les Mystères de la franc-maçonnerie dévoilés (1886) adapted Lévi's invention

In Sartor Resartus (1833–34) by Thomas Carlyle, protagonist Diogenes Teufelsdröckh describes his spiritual rebirth as a "Baphometic Fire-baptism". Clive Barker's novel Cabal (1988) and its film adaption, Nightbreed (1990), Baphomet is depicted as the god worshipped by the Night Breed creatures.

Baphomet appears as a recurring antagonist in the long-running German novel series Geisterjäger John Sinclair, in which he is the master of Vincent van Akkeren and his cult of renegade Knights Templar. The horror novels by author Jason Dark portray Baphomet as one of the three entities that form the unholy trinity of Lucifer, with the other two being Asmodis and Beelzebub.

The 2016 audio drama Robin of Sherwood: The Knights Of The Apocalypse (based on the TV show Robin of Sherwood), has Robin and his companions come into conflict with the titular Knights. The Knights of the Apocalypse are depicted as a cult which worships Baphomet; the Knights are also depicted as a splinter group from the Knights Templar.

Baphomet is depicted in the 2018 horror film Antrum as an iron device used as a brazen bull by cannibals.

In the adult series Helluva Boss Baphomet is depicted as a species originating from the Ring of Sloth.

== See also ==
- Sigil of Baphomet
- Statue of Baphomet
- Azazel
- Beelzebub
- Behemoth
- Left-hand path and right-hand path
- Mahound
- Pazuzu
- Termagant
