= Mohammedan SC (Jhenaidah) =

Sporting club in Bangladesh

Jhenaidah Mohammedan Sporting Club (Bengali: ঝিনাইদহ মোহামেডান স্পোর্টিং ক্লাব) is a major sporting club located in Jhenaidah, Bangladesh. The club previously competed in the National Football League.
