= Neidhart =

Neidhart is both a surname and a given name. Notable people with the name include:

- Christian Neidhart, German football manager
- Jim Neidhart, Canadian professional wrestler
- Natalya Neidhart, Canadian professional wrestler (daughter of Jim)
- Neidhart von Reuental, a 13th-century German minnesinger
- Nico Neidhart, German footballer
