= Ricaut Bonomel =

Italian composer

Ricaut Bonomel (En Ricatz Honomel in one chansonnier) was a Knight Templar and troubadour in the Holy Land around the time of the Eighth Crusade. He was an outspoken critic of Charles I of Naples and his attempts to secure a throne in Italy, and of the Papal policy which diverted funds intended for the Holy Land to other purposes. He was also a vocal critic of the European clergy who did not preach crusading.

Bonomel's dispute was not so much with the Italian crusades in general, but with the siphoning off of monies paid for the commuting of crusader vows to fund Angevin ambitions in Italy when they should have been going to the Holy Land. His sole surviving song, Ir'e dolors s'es dins mon cor asseza, a sirventes, is a contrafactum of a canso by Peirol, M'entencio ai tot'en un vers mesa. Ricaut demonstrates a skilled portrayal of the emotions of frustration and anger. He employs reverse psychology in an effort to stoke fervour for crusading: the Holy Land is lost, Christianity is defeated, God is on the side of the pagans. It is a conscious play on the assumption implicit in many chansons de geste that divine approval is indicated by success on the battlefield.

. . . crotz ni lei no.m val ni guia contr'als fels Turcs, cui Dieus maldia; anz es semblans, segon qu'hom pot vezer, c'al dan de nos los vol Dieus mantener —————————— Lo papa faid de perdon gran largueza contr'als Lombartz, a Carl'e als Frances e sai, ves nos, en mostra gran cobeza que nostra crotz perdona per tornes. E qui vol camjar romaria per la guerra de Lombardia nostre legatza lor en dara poder, qu'il vendon Dieu e.l perdona per aver.	. . . neither the cross nor the Christian faith help me or protect me from the wicked Turks whom God curses. It thus seems, as anyone can see, that God wishes to support them to our detriment. —————————— The pope is generous in his distribution of pardons given to Charles and the French to fight the Lombards, while he displays great miserliness toward us here, for he forgives the taking of the cross in exchange for payments in livres tournois. And whoever wishes to exchange his pilgrimage for war in Lombardy will be given the go-ahead by our legate, for they sell God and pardon for money.

The poem can be dated to between the capture of the Hospitaller castle of Arsuf to Baibars on 29 April 1265 and that of the Templar fortress at Saphet in late July 1266.

== Sources ==
- Puckett, Jaye. "Reconmenciez novele estoire: The Troubadours and the Rhetoric of the Later Crusades." MLN, Vol. 116, No. 4, French Issue. (Sep., 2001), pp. 844–889.
- Throop, Palmer A. "Criticism of Papal Crusade Policy in Old French and Provençal." Speculum, Vol. 13, No. 4. (Oct., 1938), pp. 379–412.
