= Homorhythm =

Musical texture having a "similarity of rhythm in all parts"

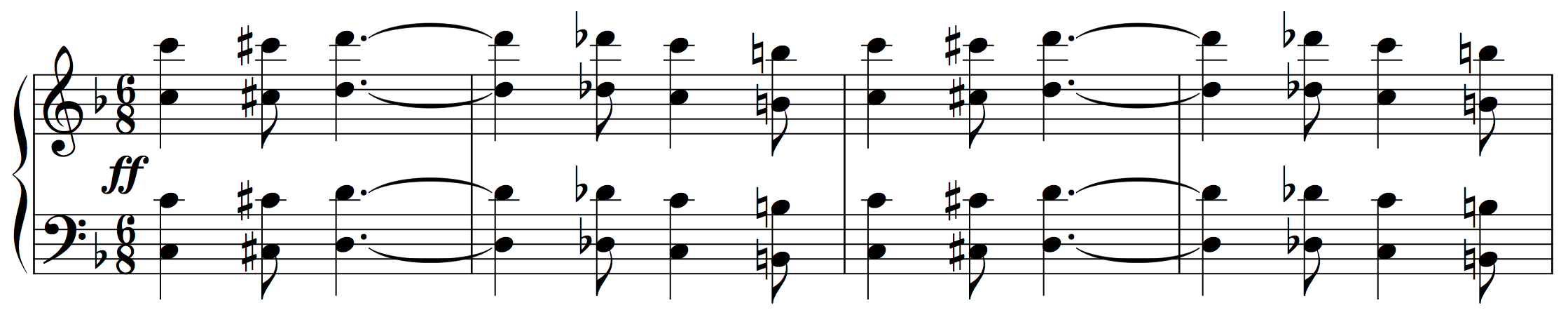
Introduction to Sousa's "Washington Post March", m. 1-7 features octave doubling and a homorhythmic texture.

In music, a homorhythm or homometer is a texture having a "similarity of rhythm in all parts" or "very similar rhythm" as would be used in simple hymn or chorale settings. Homorhythm is a condition of homophony. All voices sing the same rhythm. This texture results in a homophonic texture, which is a blocked chordal texture. Homorhythmic texture delivers lyrics with clarity and emphasis. Texture in which parts have different rhythms is heterorythmic or heterometric.

The term is used for compositions in which all the voice-parts move simultaneously in the same rhythm, forming a succession of chords. It may also be called chordal style, familiar style, vertical harmony, note-against-note style, isometric, and homophonic. Isometric may used to refer to music in which each vocal part has the same number of syllables, with isorythmic being used to refer to music in which each voice has the same rhythm.

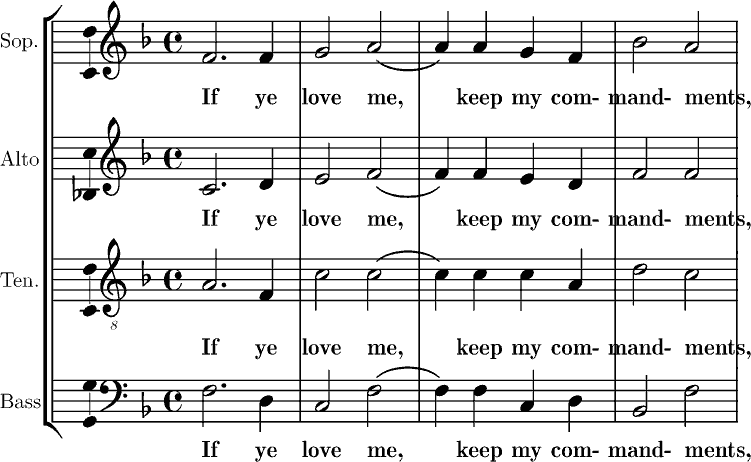
Homophony in Tallis' "If Ye Love Me", composed in 1549. The voices move together using the same rhythm, and the relationship between them creates chords: the excerpt begins and ends with an F major triad.

== Isometre ==
Isometre is the use of pulse without regular meter. The music is used in the psalmsongs of the Orthodox Reformed Churches in the Netherlands, based on the rhythm made by Petrus Datheen (16th century), as well as some other churches. Isometric music may be homometric music or music in which each vocal part has the same number of syllables, with isorythmic being used to refer to music in which each voice has the same rhythm.
