= Federico Borromeo =

Italian cardinal (1564–1631)

His Eminence Federico Borromeo
- Cardinal–Archbishop of Milan; Marquess of Angera; Count of Arona
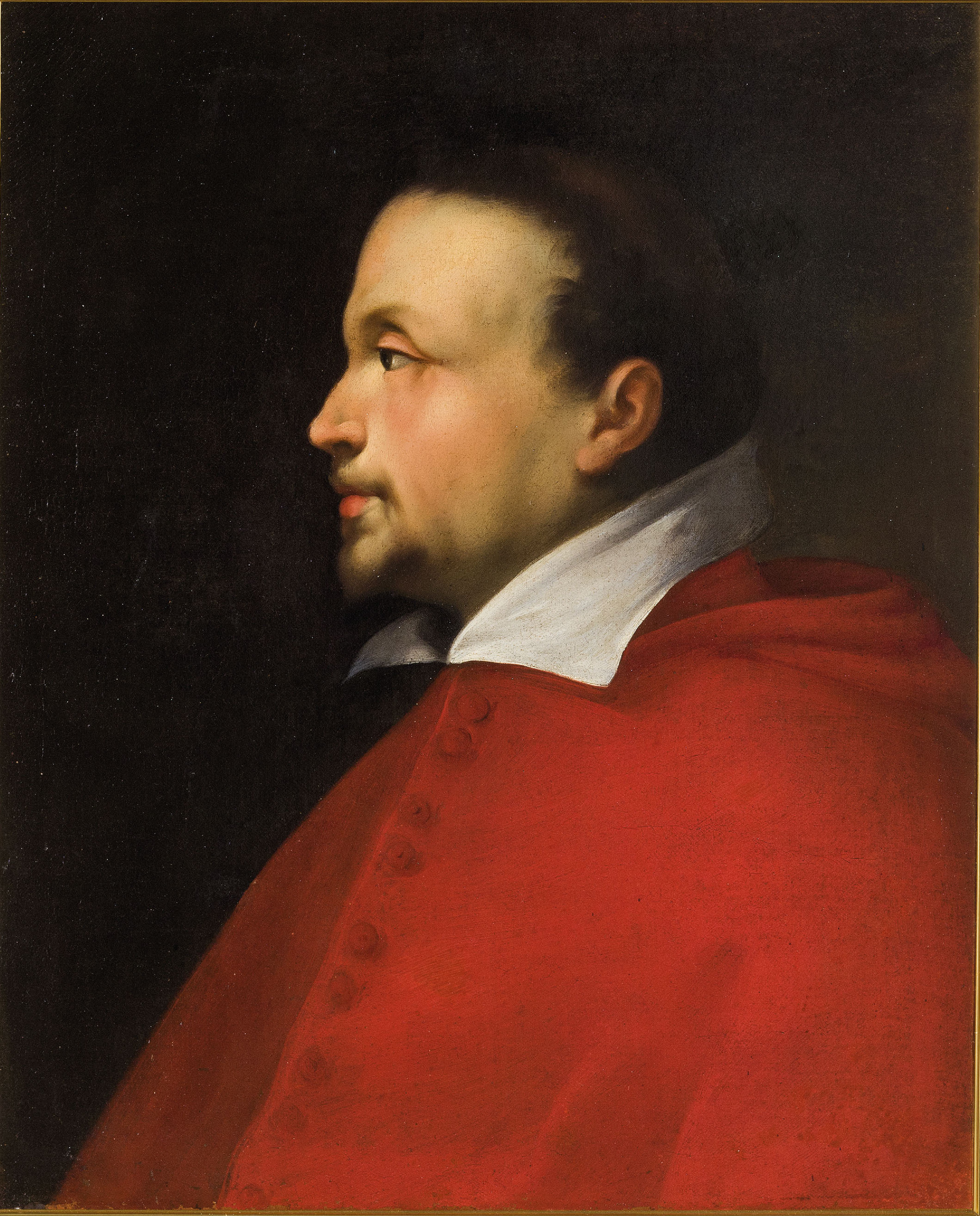
- Portrait attributed to Giulio Cesare Procaccini, 17th century
- Church: Catholic Church
- Archdiocese: Milan
- Appointed: 24 April 1595
- Term ended: 21 September 1631
- Predecessor: Gaspare Visconti
- Successor: Cesare Monti
- Other post: Cardinal-Priest of Santa Maria degli Angeli

Orders
- Consecration: 11 June 1595 by Clement VIII
- Created cardinal: 18 December 1587 by Sixtus V

Personal details
- Born: 18 August 1564 Milan, Duchy of Milan
- Died: 21 September 1631 (aged 67) Milan, Duchy of Milan
- Buried: Milan Cathedral
- Parents: Giulio Cesare Borromeo; Margherita Borromeo
- Education: University of Pavia
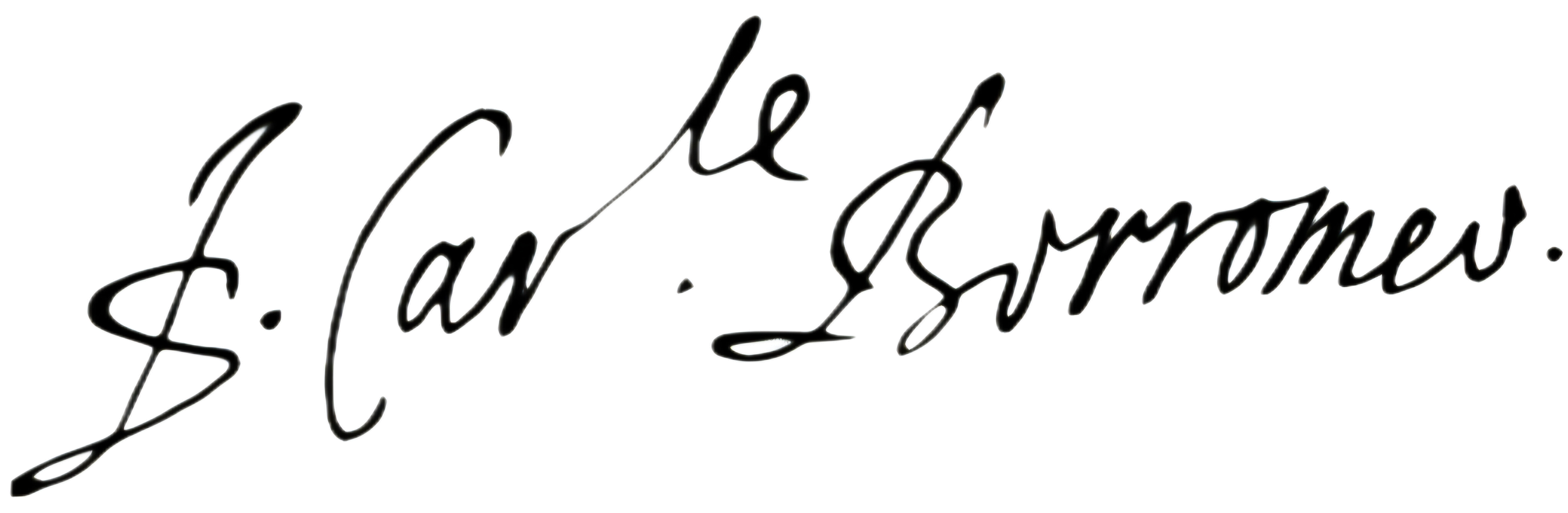
- Signature: Federico Borromeo's signature

Federico Borromeo (Italian: [fedeˈriːko borroˈmɛːo]; 18 August 1564 – 21 September 1631) was an Italian cardinal, Archbishop of Milan, and prominent figure of the Counter-Reformation in Italy. His acts of charity, particularly during the famine of 1627–28, and his devoted heroism in the plague of 1630 are well known from the account in Alessandro Manzoni's novel The Betrothed. He was a great patron of the arts and founded the Biblioteca Ambrosiana, one of the first free public libraries in Europe. In 1618 he added a picture gallery to the library, donating his own considerable collection of paintings. Borromeo's published works, mainly in Latin and numbering over 100, exhibit his interest in ecclesiastical archaeology, sacred painting, and collecting. In 1623, he reacquired the feudal rights over what has historically been known as the "State" of the Borromeo within the Duchy of Milan, becoming the Marquess of Angera and Count of Arona, titles still used by the family as a courtesy.

== Early life ==
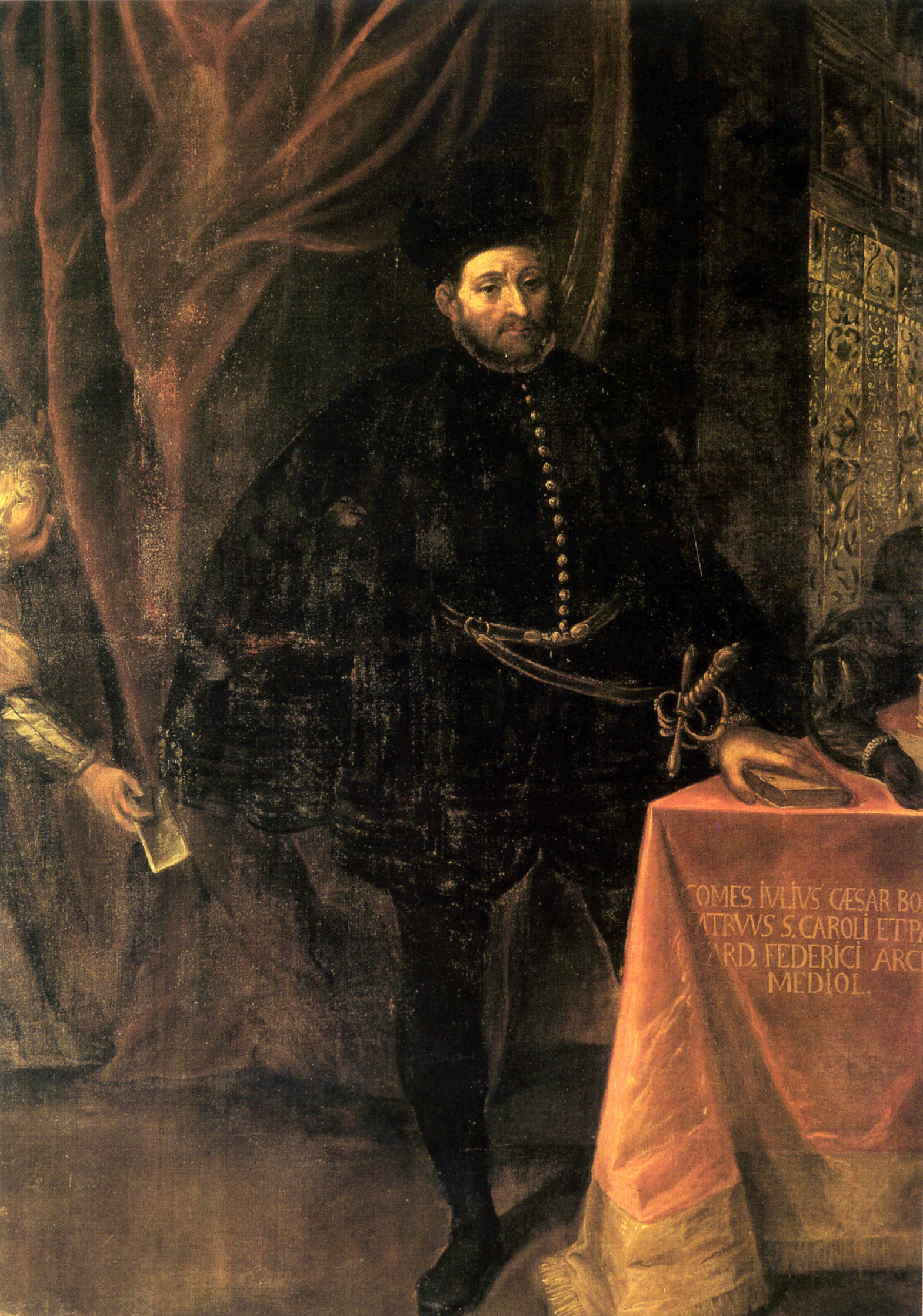
Giulio Cesare Borromeo, Federico’s father.

Federico Borromeo was born in Milan as the second son of Giulio Cesare Borromeo, Count of Arona, and Margherita Trivulzio. The family was influential in both the secular and ecclesiastical spheres and Federico was cousin of Saint Charles Borromeo, the latter previous Archbishop of Milan and a leading figure during the Counter-Reformation.

He studied in Bologna with Cardinal Gabriele Paleotti and in 1580, at the age of 16, he asked to become a Jesuit. His cousin Charles Borromeo dissuaded him and sent him to the Collegio Borromeo of Pavia where he remained for five years. In May 1585 he earned a doctorate in theology at the University of Pavia. Following the death of his cousin Charles, he was sent to Rome for higher studies, where he was strongly influenced by Philip Neri, Joseph Calasanz, Caesar Baronius and Robert Bellarmine. Federico Borromeo was created cardinal by Pope Sixtus V on 18 December 1587, at the age of only 23 years.

As cardinal, he participated in the papal conclaves of 1590, 1591, 1592, 1605 and 1623 (he was absent from the election of 1621). His attendance in the first conclave of 1590 at the age of 26 made him one of the youngest Cardinals to participate in the election of a pontiff.

Federico lived in Rome from 1586 to 1601. This period, when he mixed with scholars, theorists, patrons and artists, was crucial to the development of his culture. Federico was not particularly interested in political issues, but he focused on scholarship and prayer. He collaborated on the issuing of the Sixto-Clementine Vulgate and to the publication of the acts of the Council of Trent.

He was fascinated by the inscriptions and paintings in newly discovered catacombs, which he explored with Philip Neri, and in 1593 became the first Cardinal Protector of Federico Zuccari's Accademia di San Luca. In 1593, he met Paul Bril and Hans Rottenhammer, and soon after formed a lasting friendship with Jan Brueghel the Elder, who became part of his entourage in both Rome and Milan.

== Archbishop of Milan ==
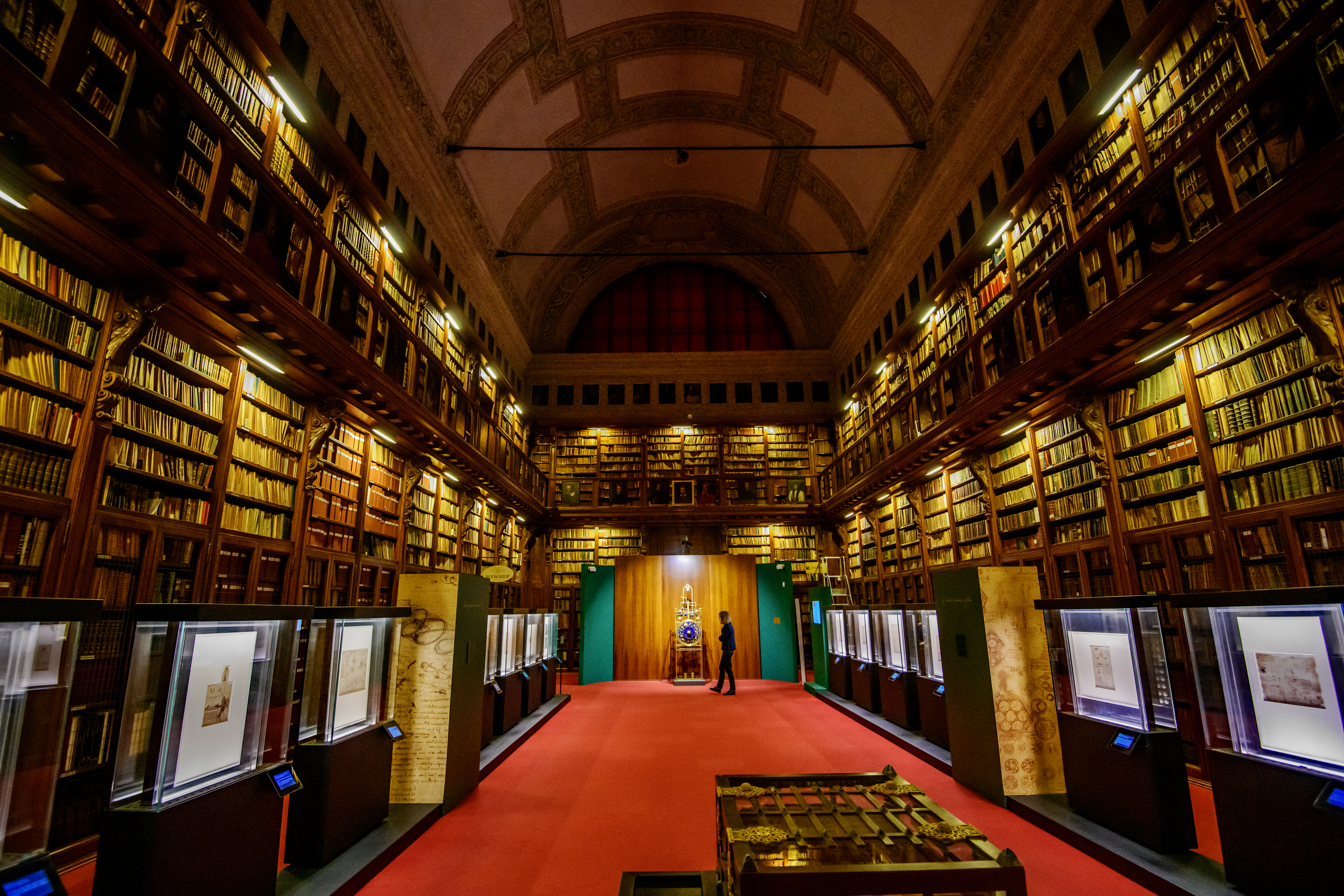
The Biblioteca Ambrosiana in Milan, founded in 1609 by Cardinal Federico Borromeo

On 24 April 1595, Pope Clement VIII appointed Federico Archbishop of Milan, and consecrated him bishop on 11 June 1595 in Rome. He followed the example of his elder cousin in promoting the discipline of the clergy, founding churches and colleges at his own expense, and applying everywhere the reformed principles set by the Council of Trent. He held a provincial council and 14 diocesan synods and made regular visits to the parishes of the diocese. Under his leadership, the city underwent more than three decades of renewed spiritual energy and significant cultural flourishing. Borromeo was both a classical and oriental scholar. Through him Erycius Puteanus was appointed professor of Latin at the Palatine School of Milan from 1600 to 1606.

In 1609, he founded the Biblioteca Ambrosiana, a Catholic study centre with permanent research posts. Intended as a weapon in the Catholic response to the Protestant offensive in theology and biblical scholarship, the library was opened to the public. In Borromeo's time, the Ambrosiana also included an art academy (formally founded in 1620, but active from about 1613). Students were to be no older than twenty-four; masters were to be men expert in their art and also capable of discussing and teaching it. Among the first were the painter Giovanni Battista Crespi, called Cerano, the sculptor Andrea Biffi and the architects Carlo Buzzi and Fabio Mangone. Cardinal Borromeo donated his collection of paintings and drawings to the library, too. The donation lists 184 paintings, which were displayed in the Pinacoteca. The Pinacoteca Ambrosiana is one of the most famous art collections in Italy, including masterpieces such as Leonardo's Portrait of a Musician, Caravaggio's Basket of Fruit, Raphael's preparatory cartoon for The School of Athens, Titian's Adoration of the Magi, the Madonna del Padiglione by Botticelli and numerous examples of the famous vases of flowers painted by Jan Brueghel, Borromeo's lifelong friend.

The Ambrosiana was, after the Bodleian at Oxford, the first genuinely public library in Europe. The library was open not merely to members of the college, which was part of the endowment, but also to citizens of Milan and to all strangers who came to study there. Using his personal funds, Cardinal Borromeo sent scholars all over Italy and the rest of Europe to purchase 30,000 books and 15,000 manuscripts. He sent out agents across the Mediterranean to find Greek manuscripts for the new foundation, with large numbers coming from Corfu, Chios, Thessaly, and Venice. A learned Hebrew convert, Domenico Gerolimitano, obtained manuscripts for him in Hebrew. Antonio Olgiati, the Cardinal's librarian and first Prefect of the Ambrosiana, was sent in search of Latin manuscripts to purchase in south Germany, the Southern Netherlands and France. Francesco Bernardino Ferrari, later Olgiati's successor as Prefect, went through Spain on the same mission. Some major acquisitions of complete libraries were the manuscripts of the Benedictine monastery of Bobbio (1606) and the library of the Paduan Vincenzo Pinelli, whose more than 800 manuscripts filled 70 cases when they were sent to Milan and included the famous Iliad, the Ilias Picta. A printing press was attached to the library and a school for instruction in the classical languages.

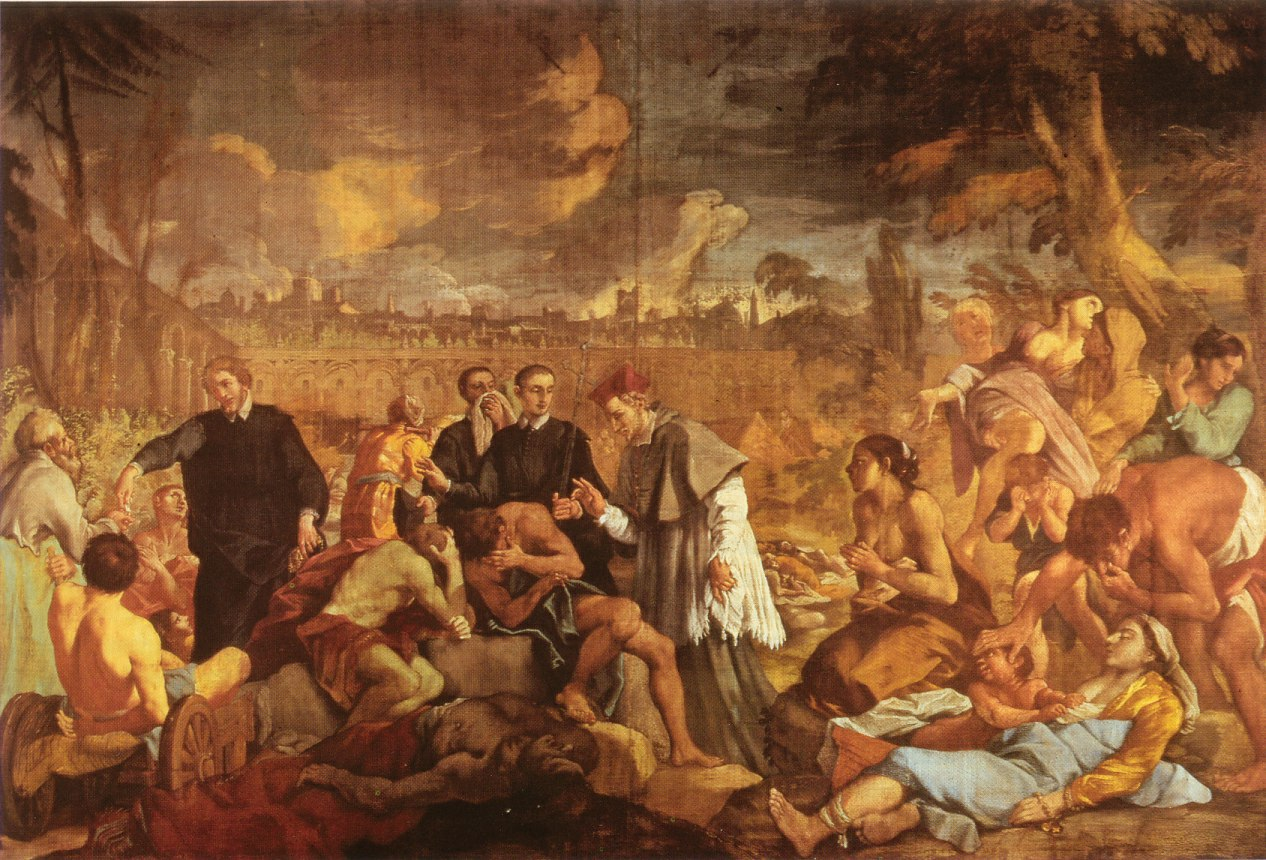
Luigi Pellegrini Scaramuccia, Federico Borromeo visits the leper house during the Plague of 1630, Milan, Biblioteca Ambrosiana

A patron of the arts, Federico had the famous Colossus of St. Charles Borromeo erected in Arona, supported the development of the Sacro Monte of Varese (today a World Heritage Site), and participated in the embellishment of the Duomo di Milano where he is buried. Borromeo was also the patron of Manfredo Settala (1600–1680), son of the famous physician Ludovico Settala, who was compiling his famous museum of natural and scientific curiosities in his family palace on the Via Pantano in Milan. After Manfredo's death in 1680, the museum stayed in the Settala family for several generations, ultimately passing in 1751 to the Biblioteca Ambrosiana.

He is most notable for his efforts to feed the poor of Milan during the great famine of 1627–1628. He was Milan's Archbishop during the Great Plague of 1630. Within the city, an average of eight out of every nine of the parish priests died of the plague, and Federico Borromeo lost almost the whole of his personal household. Nevertheless, he emulated the example of St. Charles and refused to leave the city for the relative safety of one of his country estates. Instead, he continued to issue orders to his clergy, personally visit the lazzarettos and in the words of Ripamonti 'sought out the pestilence and lived in its midst.'

Federico Borromeo took part in eight Papal conclaves. At the papal conclave of August 1623, he received 18 votes but was opposed by the Spanish party.

He died in Milan on 21 September 1631 at the age of 67. His eulogy was written by the renowned scholar Paolo Arese.

== Works ==
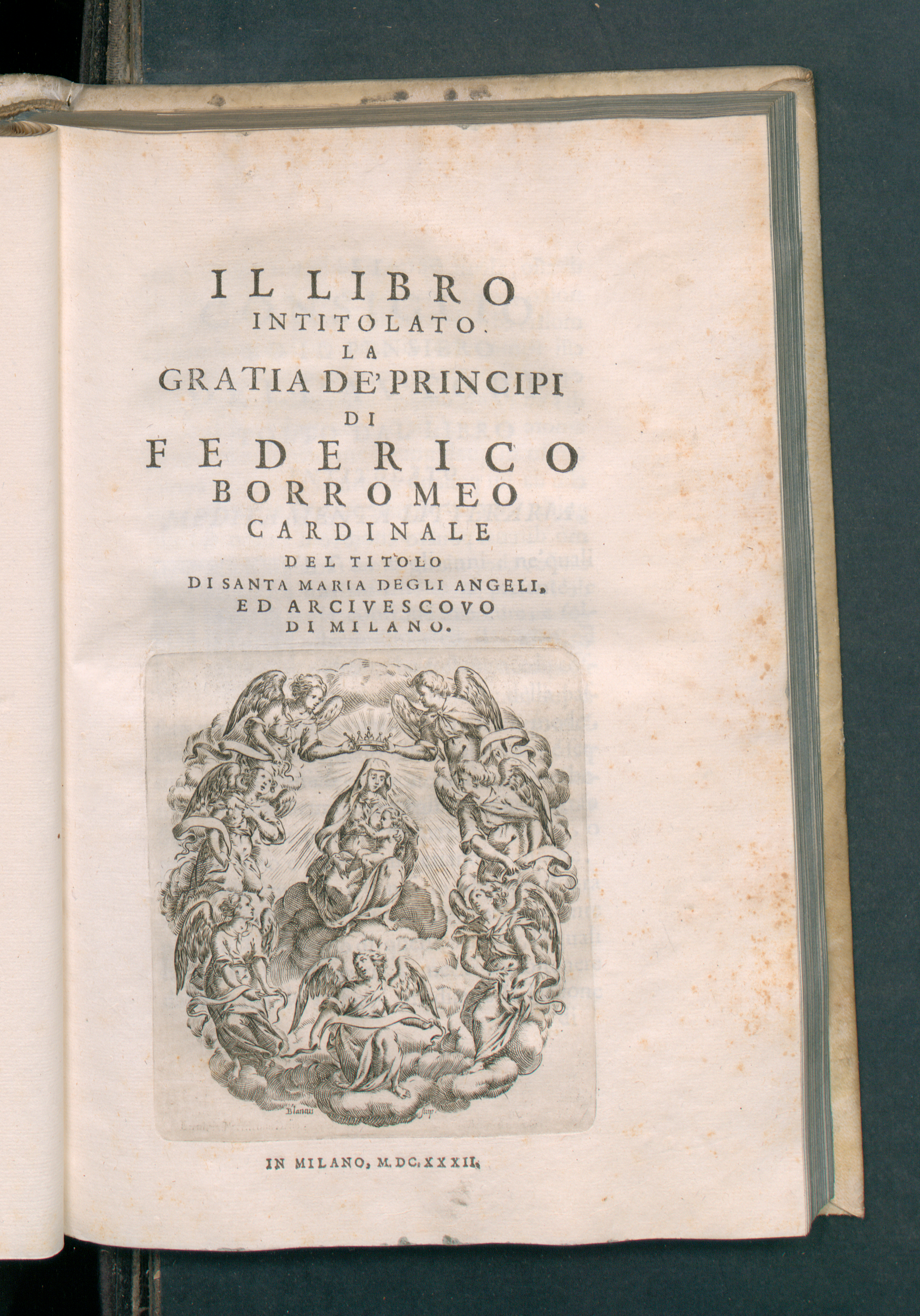
Gratia de' principi, 1632

Federico Borromeo was a prolific writer, to the extent that he can be considered the most important Milanese writer of the first half of the seventeenth century, alongside Giuseppe Ripamonti. He composed some 71 printed and 46 manuscript books written mostly in Latin that discuss various ecclesiastical issues. His better known works are Meditamenta litteraria (1619), De gratia principum (1625), De suis studiis commentarius (1627), De ecstaticis mulieribus et illusis (1616), De acquirendo contemplationis habitu, De assidua oratione, De naturali ecstasi (1617), De vita Catharinae Senensis monacae conversae (1618 on Suor Caterina Vannini of Siena), Tractatus habiti ad sacras virgines (1620–1623), De cognitionibus quas habent daemones (1624), and De linguis, nominibus et numero angelorum (1628). His writings are listed by Cesare Cantù.

His writings are inspired by a widely ranging intellectual curiosity. Besides the classics, the Church Fathers and humanist authors, he quotes from contemporary travel-books, and discusses a wide variety of topics, from Egyptian hieroglyphs to the customs and beliefs of the Africans of Guinea and the origin and antiquity of writing. He was keenly interested in science, knew Galileo and tried to enrol the latter's friend, Bonaventura Cavalieri, as Doctor of his new foundation. The Ambrosiana contains the copy of The Assayer, 1623, which Galileo presented with a covering letter to the Cardinal, 'not because I think it worthy to be read by you, but for my own esteem and to procure life and reputation for the work, in itself low and frail, in your most Illustrious and Reverend Lordship's heroic and immortal library.'

== List of works ==
- Archiepiscopalis fori Sanctae Mediolanensis Ecclesiae taxae (in Latin). Milano: eredi Pacifico Da Ponte. 1624.
- Federico Borromeo (1630). De vita contemplativa, sive de valetudine ascetica libri duo (in Latin). Milano: typographia Collegij Ambrosiani.
- Federico Borromeo (1632). De christianae mentis iucunditate libri tres (in Latin). Milano: typographia Collegij Ambrosiani.
- Federico Borromeo (1632). De sacris nostrorum temporum oratoribus libri quinque (in Latin). Milano: typographia Collegij Ambrosiani.
- Federico Borromeo (1632). De concionante episcopo libri tres (in Latin). Milano: typographia Collegij Ambrosiani.
- Federico Borromeo (1632). Il libro intitulato la gratia de' principi. Milano: Stamperia del Collegio Ambrosiano.
- Federico Borromeo (1632). I tre libri delle laudi divine. Milano: Stamperia del Collegio Ambrosiano.
- Federico Borromeo (1633) [1619]. Meditamenta litteraria (in Latin) (2 ed.). Milano: typographia Collegij Ambrosiani.
- Federico Borromeo (1756) [1618]. I tre libri della vita della venerabile madre suor Caterina Vannini sanese monaca convertita (3 ed.). Padova: Giuseppe Comino.

== Legacy ==
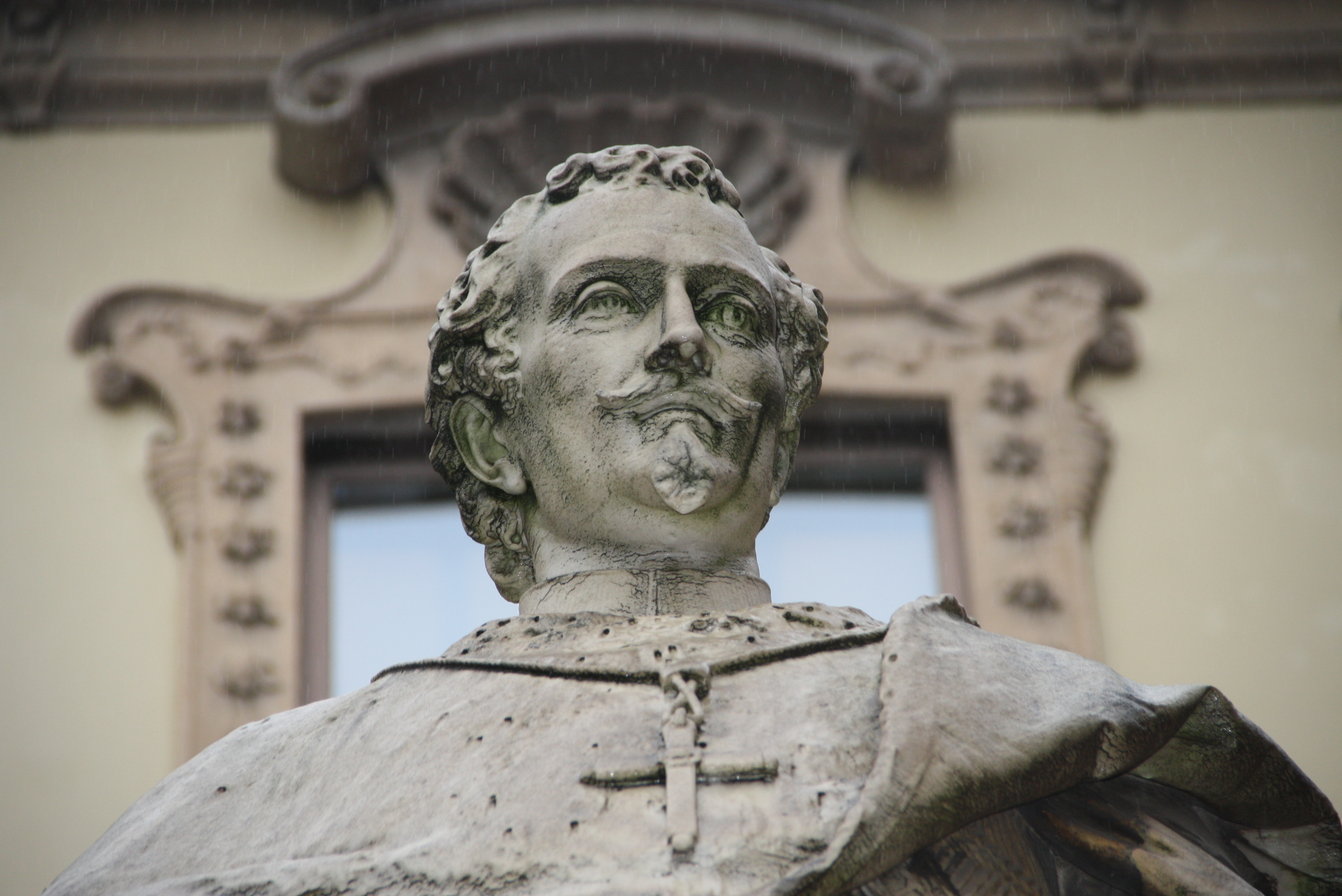
Costanzo Corti (1824-1873), Monument to Cardinal Federico Borromeo in Piazza San Sepolcro (1865)

Federico Borromeo appears as a character in Alessandro Manzoni's 1827 novel The Betrothed (I promessi sposi), in which he is characterized as an intelligent humanist and saintly servant of Christ, serving the people of Milan unselfishly during the 1630 plague; in the novel he is called Federigo Borromeo, from the Spanish. In 1865 the citizens of Milan erected a marble statue of him next to the gates of the Biblioteca Ambrosiana. The monument was realized by Costanzo Corti. It stands in Piazza San Sepolcro, in front of the former main façade of Ambrosiana, currently being its back façade. On one side of the pedestal of the statue is the phrase from Manzoni's I Promessi Sposi: "He was one of those men rare in every age, who employed extraordinary intelligence, the resources of an opulent condition, the advantages of privileged stations, and an unflinching will in the search and practice of higher and better things". On the other side are the words: "He conceived the plan of the Ambrosian Library, which he built at great expense, and organized in 1609 with an equal activity and prudence".

While at the service of Federico Borromeo, Aquilino Coppini published in 1607 his book of sacred madrigals with contrafacta texts prepared by him, based on works by Claudio Monteverdi and others. Borromeo was the dedicatee of the first of Coppini's three collections of contrafacta.

The effort to canonize Federico began soon after his death, and documents in support of his case were still being collected in the 1690s, but the process was never institutionalized by Church authorities due to the opposition of the Spanish crown.
