= List of graduation songs =

This is a list of songs that are typically played during graduation ceremonies.

== Popular traditional graduation songs by country or region ==
- Europe: "Gaudeamus Igitur", "Farandole from L'Arlésienne Suite No. 2"
- Latin America: "Triumphal March from Aida"
- Japan: "Hotaru no hikari" (Uses the same tune as "Auld Lang Syne), "Aogeba tōtoshi", "Tabidachi no Hi ni"
- The Philippines: "Triumphal March from Aida", "Pomp and Circumstance Marches", and "Farandole from L'Arlésienne Suite No. 2"
- Taiwan: "Auld Lang Syne"
- US and Canada: "Pomp and Circumstance Marches", "Land of Hope and Glory"
- Sweden: "Den blomstertid nu kommer", "I denna ljuva sommartid", "Studentsången"
- Russia: "March from The Nutcracker"
- Arab World: “Wehayat Albi” by Abdel Halim Hafez

== Modern (20th century or later) graduation songs ==
- Graduation (Friends Forever), a song by Vitamin C
- "Graduation", by Benny Blanco and Juice Wrld
- Time of Your Life (Good Riddance) by Green Day
- 10nen Sakura, a song by the Japanese idol group AKB48 released in 2009.
- "Next In Line" by Afterimage
- Through the Years, a 1981 song by Kenny Rogers
- Goodbye to You by Michelle Branch, released in 2002
- "The Whispering Wind" (earlier billed as "Whistling Wind"), "The Last Rose", and "All Those Years Ago" by Michael Flatley, released in 1998, 2005, and 2011
- Santorini by Yanni
- ”When We Were Friends” a song by Adam Fecht and Elizabeth Swearingen released in 2018 has received over 500,000 hits on YouTube.
- Unwritten, a song by Natasha Bedingfield.
- Я смотрю на них by Tarakany!
- Giovinezza (graduation song), 1909 Italian student hymn
- "Ingatlah Hari Ini" (Remember This Day), by Indonesian Pop Group Project Pop
- "At the Cross Where Phoenix Flowers Bloom" (Chinese: 凤凰花开的路口; pinyin: Fènghuáng huā kāi de lùkǒu), originally sung by Terry Lin
