= Ichinensei Ni Nattara =

"Ichinensei Ni Nattara" (一年生になったら, "When I Become A First-Grader") is a Japanese-language children's song published in 1966. It was composed by Naozumi Yamamoto and written by the poet Michio Mado.

The song's lyrics (under copyright protection) consist of a child singing about what they wish to do when they enter primary school, such as climbing Mount Fuji and eating onigiri with a hundred friends. It is often sung in kindergartens at graduation ceremonies.

From September 6, 2014, the song was used at the Tokuyama Station in Shunan City, Yamaguchi Prefecture.

== See also ==
- Hotaru no Hikari
- Tabidachi no Hi ni
