= Music of Gunbuster =

Anime series discography

This article lists the albums attributed to the anime series Gunbuster.

== Top o Nerae! Ongaku Daizukan ==
Top o Nerae! Ongaku Daizukan

Soundtrack album by Kohei Tanaka
- Released: 7 June 1989
- Recorded: 1988–1989
- Genres: Anime soundtrack; J-pop
- Length: 77:33
- Label: Victor
- Producer: Kohei Tanaka

Top o Nerae! Ongaku Daizukan (トップをねらえ！音楽大図鑑; lit. Aim for the Top! Music Encyclopedia) is the first soundtrack album of Gunbuster, released by Victor Entertainment on 7 June 1989. It features the opening theme "Active Heart" and ending theme "Try Again...!" by Noriko Sakai, plus the insert song "Top o Nerae! Fly High" by Noriko Hidaka and Rei Sakuma, Kohei Tanaka's score for the series' first four episodes, and two original radio dramas. The CD release also includes "Kimi mo Onkyō Kantoku! Top o Nerae! Naserifu Dai Kōshin", a collection of sound clips by the voice cast. The album was reissued on 18 December 1996.

=== Track listing ===
All music is composed by Kohei Tanaka, except where indicated.

No.	Title	Lyrics	Music	Artist(s)	Length
1.	"Top o Nerae! Fly High" ((トップをねらえ! ～Fly High～; "Aim for the Top! Fly High"))	Kyōko Matsumiya		Noriko Hidaka and Rei Sakuma	4:29
2.	"Ikeike Bokura no Gunbuster!!" ((いけいけぼくらのガンバスター！！; "Go Go Our Gunbuster!!"))	Hideaki Anno; Hiroshi Yamaguchi		Noriko Hidaka with Shōnen Shōjo Gasshōdan Mizūmi	3:52
3.	"Ōabare! Uchū Kaijū Gidodongas" ((大あばれ! 宇宙怪獣ギドドンガス; "Great Rampage! Space Monster Gidodongas"))			Drama	9:54
4.	"Prologue (M1)" (Purorōgu (プロローグ))				1:29
5.	"Oneesama (M3)" ((おねえさま; "Big Sister"))				1:45
6.	"Coach (Br. 13)" (Kōchi (コーチ))				0:11
7.	"Gōdō Renshū (M11)" ((合同練習; "Joint Practice"))				1:24
8.	"Eyecatch (Br. 12)" (Aikyatchi (アイキャッチ))				0:06
9.	"Honō no Tokkun (M8)) (Note: Loosely based on Vangelis' "Chariots of Fire".)" ((炎の特訓; "Training of Fire"))				2:43
10.	"Tabidachi (M19)" ((出発; "Departure"))				2:26
11.	"Exelion (M21)" (Ekuserion (エクセリオン))				1:22
12.	"Michi no Teki (Br. 10)" ((未知の敵; "The Unknown Enemy"))				0:21
13.	"Sakusen Kaishi (M13)" ((作戦開始; "The Operation Begins"))				2:07
14.	"Kiki (M17) (Note: Incorporates "Mars, the Bringer of War", from Gustav Holst's The Planets.)" ((危機; "Crisis"))				1:52
15.	"Active Heart" (Akutibu Hāto (アクティブ・ハート))	Hiromi Mori	Eiji Nishiki	Noriko Sakai	3:22
16.	"Utae!! Ginga no Hatemademo! (Note: Features the song "Rock da Go! Go! Gunbuster" (ロックだGo! Go! ガンバスター) by Kazuki Yao.)" ((歌え!! 銀河のはてまでも!; "Sing!! To the Edge of the Galaxy!"))			Drama	12:53
17.	"Smith (M7)" (Sumisu (スミス))				1:18
18.	"Sekishōku Kyosei (M15)" ((赤色巨星; "Red Giant Star"))				1:25
19.	"Zenkan Hasshin seyo (M30)" ((全艦発進せよ; "Launch All Ships"))				0:55
20.	"Senjō (M29)" ((戦場; "Battlefield"))				2:09
21.	"Kanashimi (M26)" ((悲しみ; "Sadness"))				2:44
22.	"Ketsui (M10)" ((決意; "Determination"))				1:55
23.	"Gunbuster (M20) (Note: Incorporates the State Anthem of the Soviet Union.)" (Ganbasutā (ガンバスター))				1:34
24.	"Noriko (M6)" ((ノリコ))				2:01
25.	"Requiem (Br. 4)" (Rekuiemu (レクイエム))				0:22
26.	"Exelion Chinbotsu (M2)" ((エクセリオン沈没; "Exelion Sinking"))				2:17
27.	"Try Again...!" (Torai Again...! (トライ Again・・・！))	Megumi Ogura	Nishiki	Noriko Sakai	3:32
28.	"Dai-Go wa Yokokuhen" ((第5話 予告編; "Episode 5 Trailer"))			Noriko Hidaka	0:36
29.	"Saishū wa Yokokuhen" ((最終話 予告編; "Final Episode Trailer"))			Rei Sakuma	1:27
Total length:					77:33

- Tracks 30–99 are "Kimi mo Onkyō Kantoku! Top o Nerae! Naserifu Dai Kōshin" (キミも音響監督！トップをねらえ！名セリフ大行進; lit. 'You Can Also Be the Sound Director! Aim for the Top! Parade of Famous Lines'), which run at 4–7 seconds each.
- Tracks 28–99 are not available on the LP and cassette versions.

== Top o Nerae! Ultra Sound Collection: Tanaka Kohei no Sekai ==
Top o Nerae! Ultra Sound Collection: Tanaka Kohei no Sekai

Soundtrack album by Kohei Tanaka
- Released: 21 March 1990
- Recorded: 1988–1989
- Genre: Anime soundtrack
- Length: 74:33
- Label: Victor
- Producer: Kohei Tanaka

Top o Nerae! Ultra Sound Collection: Tanaka Kohei no Sekai (トップをねらえ!ウルトラ・サウンド・コレクション ～田中公平の世界～; lit. Aim for the Top! Ultra Sound Collection: The World of Kohei Tanaka) is the second soundtrack of Gunbuster, released on 21 March 1990. It features more of Tanaka's score for all six episodes, plus the image song "Tobe! Gunbuster" by Kazuki Yao, one radio drama, and the symphonic suite "Kōkyōshi Gunbuster". Like the first soundtrack, this album was reissued on 18 December 1996.

=== Track listing ===
All music is composed by Kohei Tanaka, except where indicated.

No.	Title	Lyrics	Music	Artist(s)	Length
1.	"Ikeike Bokura no Gunbuster!!" (TV Size)	Hideaki Anno; Hiroshi Yamaguchi		Noriko Hidaka with Shōnen Shōjo Gasshōdan Mizūmi	1:49
2.	"Dai-Ichi wa Subtitle" ((第1話サブタイトル; "Episode 1 Subtitle"))				0:13
3.	"Gekō -Shinsekai Yori- (M-23) (Note: "Largo", from Dvořák's New World Symphony.)" ((下校 －新世界より－; "Leaving School -From the New World-"))		Antonín Dvořák		1:39
4.	"Hōkago no Kettō (M-16)" ((放課後の決闘; "Duel After School"))				3:15
5.	"Inazuma Kick (M-24)" (Inazuma Kikku (イナズマキック; "Lightning Kick"))				1:27
6.	"Dai-Ni wa Subtitle" ((第2話サブタイトル; "Episode 2 Subtitle"))				0:06
7.	"Jung Freud (M-9)" (Yungu Froito (ユング・フロイト))				2:05
8.	"Kimodameshi (Br-11)" ((キモだめし; "Gross"))				1:01
9.	"Hajimete no Shutsugeki (M-28)" ((初めての出撃; "First Sortie"))				1:17
10.	"Kagaku Kōza no Uta" ((科学講座のうた; "Science Lesson Song"))				0:18
11.	"Bridge Collection (Br-7, Br-5)" (Buridji Korekushon (ブリッジ・コレクション))				0:24
12.	"Aogeba Tōtoshi" ((仰げば尊し; "If You Look Up to Me, I Will Respect You"))		Traditional		1:23
13.	"Hiai (M-5)" ((悲哀; "Sorrow"))				1:11
14.	"Harukanaru Exelion (M-14)" (Harukanaru Ekuserion (遥かなるエクセリオン; "A Distant Exelion"))				1:21
15.	"Shōri no Gunbuster (M-31)" (Shōri no Ganbasutā (勝利のガンバスター; "Gunbuster's Victory"))				1:27
16.	"Dai-Roku wa Subtitle (M-32)" ((第6話 サブタイトル; "Episode 6 Subtitle"))				0:22
17.	"Ginga Chūshin Nagurikomi Kantai (M-33)" ((銀河中心殴り込み艦隊; "Galactic Center Attack Fleet"))				0:21
18.	"Carneades Keikaku (M-34)" (Karuneadesu Keikaku (カルネアデス計画; "Project Carneades"))				2:33
19.	"Saishū Kessen (M-36)" ((最終決戦; "The Final Battle"))				1:27
20.	"Hisōnaru Ketsui (M-35)" ((悲愴なる決意; "A Pathetic Decision"))				1:32
21.	"Toki no Kawa wo Koete... (M-37)" ((時の河を越えて…; "Beyond the River of Time..."))				4:50
22.	"Kessaku Yokokuhen-shū" ((傑作予告篇集; "Masterpiece Trailer Collection"))			Noriko Hidaka, Rei Sakuma, Maria Kawamura, Tamio Ōki, and Norio Wakamoto	9:29
23.	"Tobe! Gunbuster" (Tobe! Ganbasutā (翔べ!ガンバスター; "Fly! Gunbuster"))	Anno; Yamaguchi		Kazuki Yao	3:20
24.	"Kieta Kon'yaku Yubiwa" ((消えた婚約指輪; "The Missing Engagement Ring"))			Drama	15:01
25.	"Kōkyōshi Gunbuster" ((交響詩「GUNBUSTER」; "Symphonic Poem Gunbuster"))	Kyōko Matsumiya		Noriko Hidaka	10:18
26.	"Genkide ne" ((元気でね; "Take Care"))	Matsumiya		Noriko Hidaka, Rei Sakuma, Maria Kawamura, Kazuki Yao, Norio Wakamoto, and Tamio Ōki	6:24
Total length:					74:33

== Sound Collection of Gunbuster ==
Sound Collection of Gunbuster

Soundtrack album by Kohei Tanaka
- Released: 24 August 1994
- Recorded: 1988–1989
- Genres: Anime soundtrack; J-pop
- Length: 3:55:49
- Label: Victor
- Producer: Kohei Tanaka

Alternative cover
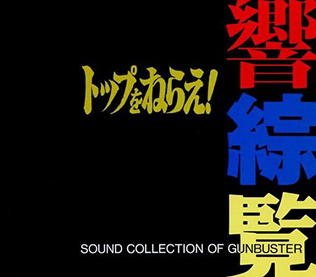
- Original cardboard sleeve of the first release

Sound Collection of Gunbuster (トップをねらえ!響綜覧, Top o Nerae! Kyōsōran) is a box set released on 24 August 1994. The three-disc set compiles the first two soundtracks and adds more background music and dialogue tracks, as well as new songs and karaoke tracks.

=== Track listing ===
All music is composed by Kohei Tanaka, except where indicated.

Disc 1
No.	Title	Lyrics	Music	Artist(s)	Length
1.	"Active Heart" (Akutibu Hāto (アクティブ・ハート))	Hiromi Mori	Eiji Nishiki	Noriko Sakai	3:22
2.	"Try Again...!" (Torai Again...! (トライ Again・・・！))	Megumi Ogura	Nishiki	Noriko Sakai	3:28
3.	"Top o Nerae! Fly High" ((トップをねらえ! ～Fly High～; "Aim for the Top! Fly High"))	Kyōko Matsumiya		Noriko Hidaka and Rei Sakuma	4:29
4.	"Ikeike Bokura no Gunbuster!!" ((いけいけぼくらのガンバスター！！; "Go Go Our Gunbuster!!"))	Hideaki Anno; Hiroshi Yamaguchi		Noriko Hidaka with Shōnen Shōjo Gasshōdan Mizūmi	3:52
5.	"Tobe! Gunbuster" (Tobe! Ganbasutā (翔べ!ガンバスター; "Fly! Gunbuster"))	Anno; Yamaguchi		Kazuki Yao	3:19
6.	"Genkide ne" ((元気でね; "Take Care"))	Matsumiya		Noriko Hidaka, Rei Sakuma, Maria Kawamura, Kazuki Yao, Norio Wakamoto, and Tamio Ōki	6:22
7.	"Ikeike Bokura no Gunbuster!!" (TV Size)	Anno; Yamaguchi		Noriko Hidaka with Shōnen Shōjo Gasshōdan Mizūmi	1:49
8.	"Ōabare! Uchū Kaijū Gidodongas" ((大あばれ! 宇宙怪獣ギドドンガス; "Great Rampage! Space Monster Gidodongas"))			Drama	9:54
9.	"Active Heart" (Video Size)	Mori	Nishiki	Noriko Sakai	1:24
10.	"Utae!! Ginga no Hatemademo!" ((歌え!! 銀河のはてまでも!; "Sing!! To the Edge of the Galaxy!"))			Drama	12:52
11.	"Try Again...!" (Video Size)	Ogura	Nishiki	Noriko Sakai	1:27
12.	"Kieta Kon'yaku Yubiwa" ((消えた婚約指輪; "The Missing Engagement Ring"))			Drama	14:59
13.	"Dai-Go wa Yokoku (Video-ban)" ((第5話予告（ビデオ版）; "Episode 5 Preview (Video Version)"))			Noriko Hidaka	0:36
14.	"Dai-Roku wa Yokoku (Video-ban)" ((第6話予告（ビデオ版）; "Episode 6 Preview (Video Version)"))			Rei Sakuma	1:10
Total length:					78:37

- Tracks 15–99 are "Kimi mo Onkyō Kantoku! Top o Nerae! Mezerifu Dai Kōshin" (キミも音響監督！ トップをねらえ！名台詞大行進; lit. 'You Can Also Be the Sound Director! Aim for the Top! Parade of Famous Lines'), which run at 4–45 seconds each.

Disc 2
No.	Title	Lyrics	Music	Artist(s)	Length
1.	"Prologue (M-1)" (Purorōgu (プロローグ))				1:30
2.	"Exelion Chinbotsu (M-2)" ((エクセリオン沈没; "Exelion Sinking"))				2:17
3.	"Oneesama (M-3)" ((おねえさま; "Big Sister"))				1:45
4.	"Hiai (M-5)" ((悲哀; "Sorrow"))				1:11
5.	"Noriko (M-6)" ((ノリコ))				2:02
6.	"Smith (M-7)" (Sumisu (スミス))				1:18
7.	"Honō no Tokkun (M-8)" ((炎の特訓; "Training of Fire"))				2:44
8.	"Jung Freud (M-9)" (Yungu Froito (ユング・フロイト))				2:05
9.	"Ketsui (M-10)" ((決意; "Determination"))				1:55
10.	"Gōdō Renshū (M-11)" ((合同練習; "Joint Practice"))				1:25
11.	"Sakusen Kaishi (M-13)" ((作戦開始; "The Operation Begins"))				2:07
12.	"Harukanaru Exelion (M-14)" (Harukanaru Ekuserion (遥かなるエクセリオン; "A Distant Exelion"))				1:21
13.	"Sekishōku Kyosei (M-15)" ((赤色巨星; "Red Giant Star"))				1:25
14.	"Hōkago no Kettō (M-16)" ((放課後の決闘; "Duel After School"))				3:15
15.	"Kiki (M-17)" ((危機; "Crisis"))				1:51
16.	"Tabidachi (M-19)" ((出発; "Departure"))				2:27
17.	"Gunbuster (M-20)" (Ganbasutā (ガンバスター))				1:34
18.	"Exelion (M-21)" (Ekuserion (エクセリオン))				1:22
19.	"M-22 (Note: Sonatina in G Major, Anh. 5 No. 1)"		Ludwig van Beethoven		1:20
20.	"Gekō -Shinsekai Yori- (M-23)" ((下校 －新世界より－; "Leaving School -From the New World-"))		Dvořák		1:39
21.	"Inazuma Kick (M-24)" (Inazuma Kikku (イナズマキック; "Lightning Kick"))				1:27
22.	"Kanashimi (M-26)" ((悲しみ; "Sadness"))				2:45
23.	"Requiem (Br-4)" (Rekuiemu (レクイエム))				0:23
24.	"Br-5"				0:18
25.	"Br-6 (1)"				0:33
26.	"Dai-Ni wa Subtitle (Br-6 (2))" ((第2話サブタイトル; "Episode 2 Subtitle"))				0:07
27.	"Dai-Ichi wa Subtitle (Br-6 (5))" ((第1話サブタイトル; "Episode 1 Subtitle"))				0:13
28.	"Br-6 (14)"				0:05
29.	"Br-6 (15)"				0:05
30.	"Br-7"				0:07
31.	"Michi no Teki (Br-10)" ((未知の敵; "The Unknown Enemy"))				0:22
32.	"Kimodameshi (Br-11)" ((キモだめし; "Gross"))				1:01
33.	"Eyecatch (Br-12)" (Aikyatchi (アイキャッチ))				0:07
34.	"Coach (Br-13)" (Kōchi (コーチ))				0:11
35.	"Br-14"				0:06
36.	"Ep Solo Romance (2)" (Ep Soro Romansu (2) (Epソロ ロマンス②))				1:07
37.	"Kagaku Kōza no Uta" ((科学講座のうた; "Science Lesson Song"))				0:17
38.	"Hajimete no Shutsugeki (M-28)" ((初めての出撃; "First Sortie"))				1:17
39.	"Senjō (M-29)" ((戦場; "Battlefield"))				2:08
40.	"Zenkan Hasshin seyo (M-30)" ((全艦発進せよ; "Launch All Ships"))				0:55
41.	"Shōri no Gunbuster (M-31)" (Shōri no Ganbasutā (勝利のガンバスター; "Gunbuster's Victory"))				1:26
42.	"Dai-Roku wa Subtitle (M-32)" ((第6話 サブタイトル; "Episode 6 Subtitle"))				0:22
43.	"Ginga Chūshin Nagurikomi Kantai (M-33)" ((銀河中心殴り込み艦隊; "Galactic Center Attack Fleet"))				0:21
44.	"Carneades Keikaku (M-34)" (Karuneadesu Keikaku (カルネアデス計画; "Project Carneades"))				2:32
45.	"Hisōnaru Ketsui (M-35)" ((悲愴なる決意; "A Pathetic Decision"))				1:31
46.	"Saishū Kessen (M-36)" ((最終決戦; "The Final Battle"))				1:27
47.	"Toki no Kawa wo Koete... (M-37)" ((時の河を越えて…; "Beyond the River of Time..."))				4:48
48.	"Aogeba Tōtoshi" ((仰げば尊し; "If You Look Up to Me, I Will Respect You"))		Traditional		1:23
49.	"Pf Solo Sono 1" (PF Soro Sono Ichi (Pfソロ その1))				0:08
50.	"Pf Bridge Sono 2" (PF Buridji Sono Ni (Pfブリッジ その2))				0:07
51.	"Kōkyōshi Gunbuster" ((交響詩「GUNBUSTER」; "Symphonic Poem Gunbuster"))	Matsumiya		Noriko Hidaka	10:17
Total length:					78:26

- Tracks 52–99 are "Kimi mo Onkyō Kantoku! Top o Nerae! Mezerifu Dai Kōshin", which run at 4–7 seconds each.

Disc 3
No.	Title	Lyrics	Music	Artist(s)	Length
1.	"Top o Nerae! Fly Away" ((トップをねらえ! ～Fly Away～; "Aim for the Top! Fly Away"))	Matsumiya		Noriko Hidaka and Rei Sakuma	4:20
2.	"Kandō! Exelion no March" (Kandō! Ekuserion no Māchi (感動！エクセリオンのマーチ; "Impressive! Exelion March"))	Anno; Yamaguchi		Tokyo Konsei Gasshōdan	3:18
3.	"Yūjō Power wa Bugendai! Taose, Topology Gas (Note: Features a rendition of "Ganbaron '77" by Noriko Hidaka and Rei Sakuma and a version of the song "Top o Nerae! Fly High" by Tamio Ōki and Tomomichi Nishimura.)" (Yūjō Pawā wa Bugendai! Taose, Toporojī Gyasu (友情パワーは無限大！倒せ、トポロジー・ギャス; "The Power of Friendship Is Infinite! Defeat Topology Gas"))			Drama	17:16
4.	"Active Heart" (Video Size Karaoke)		Nishiki		1:24
5.	"Try Again...!" (Video Size Karaoke)		Nishiki		1:27
6.	"Top o Nerae! Fly High" (Original Karaoke)				4:29
7.	"Ikeike Bokura no Gunbuster!!" (TV Size Karaoke)				1:41
8.	"Tobe! Gunbuster" (One-Half Karaoke)				1:42
9.	"Genkide ne" (Original Karaoke)				6:30
36.	"Top o Nerae! Oshaberi Cassette" (Top o Nerae! Oshaberi Kasetto (トップをねらえ! おしゃべりカセット; "Aim for the Top! Talking Cassette"))			Drama	9:29
Total length:					78:28

- Tracks 10–35 are "Top o Nerae! Yokoku Henshū (Kanzen-han)" (トップをねらえ! 予告編集(完全版); lit. 'Aim for the Top! Preview Edits (Complete Version)').
- Tracks 37–99 are "Kimi mo Onkyō Kantoku! Top o Nerae! Mezerifu Dai Kōshin", which run at 4–10 seconds each.

== Top o Nerae! Ongaku-shū ==
Top o Nerae! Ongaku-shū

Soundtrack album by Kohei Tanaka
- Released: 26 March 2013
- Recorded: 1988–1989
- Genre: Anime soundtrack
- Length: 88:03
- Label: FlyingDog
- Producer: Kohei Tanaka

Top o Nerae! Ongaku-shū (トップをねらえ！音楽集; lit. Aim for the Top! Music Collection) is a soundtrack compilation for Gunbuster, released by FlyingDog on 26 March 2013, exclusively on music download and streaming media platforms. The album compiles the first two soundtracks, omitting the opening and ending themes, radio dramas, and character voice clips. The track "Honō no Tokkun" is also omitted due to its similarity to Vangelis' "Chariots of Fire".

=== Track listing ===
All music is composed by Kohei Tanaka, except where indicated.

No.	Title	Lyrics	Music	Artist(s)	Length
1.	"Top o Nerae! Fly High" ((トップをねらえ! ～Fly High～; "Aim for the Top! Fly High"))	Kyōko Matsumiya		Noriko Hidaka and Rei Sakuma	4:28
2.	"Ikeike Bokura no Gunbuster!!" ((いけいけぼくらのガンバスター！！; "Go Go Our Gunbuster!!"))	Hideaki Anno; Hiroshi Yamaguchi		Noriko Hidaka with Shōnen Shōjo Gasshōdan Mizūmi	3:52
3.	"Prologue (M1)" (Purorōgu (プロローグ))				1:28
4.	"Oneesama (M3)" ((おねえさま; "Big Sister"))				1:44
5.	"Coach (Br13)" (Kōchi (コーチ))				0:10
6.	"Gōdō Renshū (M11)" ((合同練習; "Joint Practice"))				1:24
7.	"Eyecatch (Br12)" (Aikyatchi (アイキャッチ))				0:06
8.	"Tabidachi (M19)" ((出発; "Departure"))				2:26
9.	"Exelion (M21)" (Ekuserion (エクセリオン))				1:21
10.	"Michi no Teki (Br10)" ((未知の敵; "The Unknown Enemy"))				0:21
11.	"Sakusen Kaishi (M13)" ((作戦開始; "The Operation Begins"))				2:06
12.	"Kiki (M17)" ((危機; "Crisis"))				1:50
13.	"Smith (M7)" (Sumisu (スミス))				1:17
14.	"Sekishōku Kyosei (M15)" ((赤色巨星; "Red Giant Star"))				1:24
15.	"Zenkan Hasshin seyo (M30)" ((全艦発進せよ; "Launch All Ships"))				0:54
16.	"Senjō (M29)" ((戦場; "Battlefield"))				2:07
17.	"Kanashimi (M26)" ((悲しみ; "Sadness"))				2:43
18.	"Ketsui (M10)" ((決意; "Determination"))				1:54
19.	"Gunbuster (M20)" (Ganbasutā (ガンバスター))				1:34
20.	"Noriko (M6)" ((ノリコ))				2:01
21.	"Requiem (Br4)" (Rekuiemu (レクイエム))				0:22
22.	"Exelion Chinbotsu (M2)" ((エクセリオン沈没; "Exelion Sinking"))				2:15
23.	"Ikeike Bokura no Gunbuster!" (TV Size)	Anno; Yamaguchi		Noriko Hidaka with Shōnen Shōjo Gasshōdan Mizūmi	1:48
24.	"Dai-Ichi wa Subtitle" ((第1話サブタイトル; "Episode 1 Subtitle"))				0:12
25.	"Gekō -Shinsekai Yori-" ((下校 －新世界より－; "Leaving School -From the New World-"))		Dvořák		1:38
26.	"Hōkago no Kettō" ((放課後の決闘; "Duel After School"))				3:15
27.	"Inazuma Kick" (Inazuma Kikku (イナズマキック; "Lightning Kick"))				1:26
28.	"Dai-Ni wa Subtitle" ((第2話サブタイトル; "Episode 2 Subtitle"))				0:06
29.	"Jung Freud" (Yungu Froito (ユング・フロイト))				2:04
30.	"Kimodameshi" ((キモだめし; "Gross"))				1:00
31.	"Hajimete no Shutsugeki" ((初めての出撃; "First Sortie"))				1:16
32.	"Kagaku Kōza no Uta" ((科学講座のうた; "Science Lesson Song"))				0:17
33.	"Bridge Collection" (Buridji Korekushon (ブリッジ・コレクション))				0:22
34.	"Aogeba Tōtoshi" ((仰げば尊し; "If You Look Up to Me, I Will Respect You"))		Traditional		1:22
35.	"Hiai" ((悲哀; "Sorrow"))				1:10
36.	"Harukanaru Exelion" (Harukanaru Ekuserion (遥かなるエクセリオン; "A Distant Exelion"))				1:20
37.	"Shōri no Gunbuster" (Shōri no Ganbasutā (勝利のガンバスター; "Gunbuster's Victory"))				1:26
38.	"Dai-Roku wa Subtitle" ((第6話 サブタイトル; "Episode 6 Subtitle"))				0:21
39.	"Ginga Chūshin Nagurikomi Kantai" ((銀河中心殴り込み艦隊; "Galactic Center Attack Fleet"))				0:20
40.	"Carneades Keikaku" (Karuneadesu Keikaku (カルネアデス計画; "Project Carneades"))				2:31
41.	"Saishū Kessen" ((最終決戦; "The Final Battle"))				1:26
42.	"Hisōnaru Ketsui" ((悲愴なる決意; "A Pathetic Decision"))				1:30
43.	"Toki no Kawa wo Koete..." ((時の河を越えて…; "Beyond the River of Time..."))				4:47
44.	"Tobe! Gunbuster" (Tobe! Ganbasutā (翔べ!ガンバスター; "Fly! Gunbuster"))	Anno; Yamaguchi		Kazuki Yao	3:18
45.	"Kōkyōshi Gunbuster" ((交響詩「GUNBUSTER」; "Symphonic Poem Gunbuster"))	Matsumiya		Noriko Hidaka	10:16
46.	"Genkide ne" ((元気でね; "Take Care"))	Matsumiya		Noriko Hidaka, Rei Sakuma, Maria Kawamura, Kazuki Yao, Norio Wakamoto, and Tamio Ōki	6:21
Total length:					88:03
