= Aquilino Coppini =

Italian musician and lyricist

Aquilino Coppini (died 1629) was an Italian musician and lyricist.

== Life and works ==
While in the service of Cardinal Federico Borromeo, he specialized in creating sacred contrafacta of secular madrigals. His contrafacta are of interest for their concentration on Monteverdi's madrigals (especially the third, fourth and fifth books) and for the form in which he treats the poetic text. According to Antonio Delfino, "rather than simply replacing the original text with a liturgical one, he ‘spiritualized’ then through a careful translation which, like an exercise in rhetorical expertise, reproduces the phonemes, accents and rhythms of the secular text." His letter collection Epistolarum libri sex, published in Milan in 1613, provides information on both his contacts with important figures of the day and on some of the main stages of his career, culminating in the appointment to the chair of rhetoric at the University of Pavia. In a letter to Hendrik van den Putten published in the collection, Coppini says that "the Monteverdi pieces need longer pauses, resting occasionally, allowing retardation, and at times even pressing on. There is in them a wonderful power to move the passions exceedingly."

== Publications ==
- Musica tolta da i madrigali di Claudio Monteverde, e d'altri autori … e fatta spirituale, a cinque, et sei voci, Milan, 1607
- Il secondo libro della musica di Claudio Monteverde, e d'altri autori à 5, Milan, 1608 (lost)
- Il terzo libro della musica di Claudio Monteverde a cinque voci fatta spirituale da Aquilino Coppini, Milan, 1609
- Aquilini Coppini in Ticinensi Gymnasio Artis Oratoriae Regij Interpretis Epistolarum libri sex. Milan: apud typographos curię archiepiscopalis. 1613.
