= Tabidachi no Hi ni =

1991 composition by Noboru Kojima

Composition
- Language: Japanese
- English title: On the Day of Departure
- Written: 1991
- Published: 1991
- Composer: Hiromi Takahashi
- Lyricist: Noboru Kojima

"Tabidachi no Hi ni" (Japanese: 旅立ちの日に; lit. On the Day of Departure) is a Japanese song written by Noboru Kojima. First performed in 1991, it became one of the most commonly used graduation songs in Japan.

== Background and composition ==
The song was written in February 1991 by Noboru Kojima, a former principal and music teacher at Kagemori Junior High School in Chichibu, Saitama. It was composed by Hiromi Takahashi, a music teacher at the school, and arranged by Takao Matsui, a friend of Takahashi and a school teacher in Tokyo.

Takahashi said that she asked Kojima to write a poem as a special gift to the graduating students in February 1991. At first, Kojima refused, but the next morning, she found a finished poem on her desk. She also said that it only took her 15 minutes to compose the song. The song was first used in March 1991 when Kojima, who was about to retire, and other faculty surprised the graduating students by singing the song at a farewell event.

== Spread ==
According to Takahashi, the song was meant to be used for one time only, but in the following years, the song continued to be used during cultural festivals and graduation in the song, and later spread to neighboring schools. It gained nationwide attention when the sheet music of the song was featured in a music magazine Kyoiku Ongaku. It was featured in a program in 2004 and was sung by the J-Pop group SMAP for a commercial for NTT East Japan in 2007. In 2016, Seibu-Chichibu Station in Nosaka-cho, Chichibu changed its departure melody into the song.

== Popularity ==
Although the Ministry of Education, Culture, Sports, Science and Technology has stated no rules about the songs that must be sung at graduation ceremonies, "Tabidachi no Hi ni" became one of the common graduation song in Japan and becoming the "new standard" replacing songs like "Aogeba Tōtoshi".

In a survey conducted by Oricon in 2008, the song ranked third overall in a "songs that have been sung at graduation ceremonies", ranked first in the middle and high school category, ranked second in the college category, and fourth on "working adults in their 20s" category. In a survey by Line Music in 2025, the song ranked seventh in the graduation song ranking in the "teenager" category, Ai Kawashima's song of the same name was ranked fifth in both the "20s" and "30s" category, the choral version of the song was ranked fourth in the "30s" category. Similarly, Rakuten Books also conducted a survey in January 2025 on the "Memorable Graduation Songs", the song was the top one graduations songs of people in their 20s and their 30s.

== Reception ==
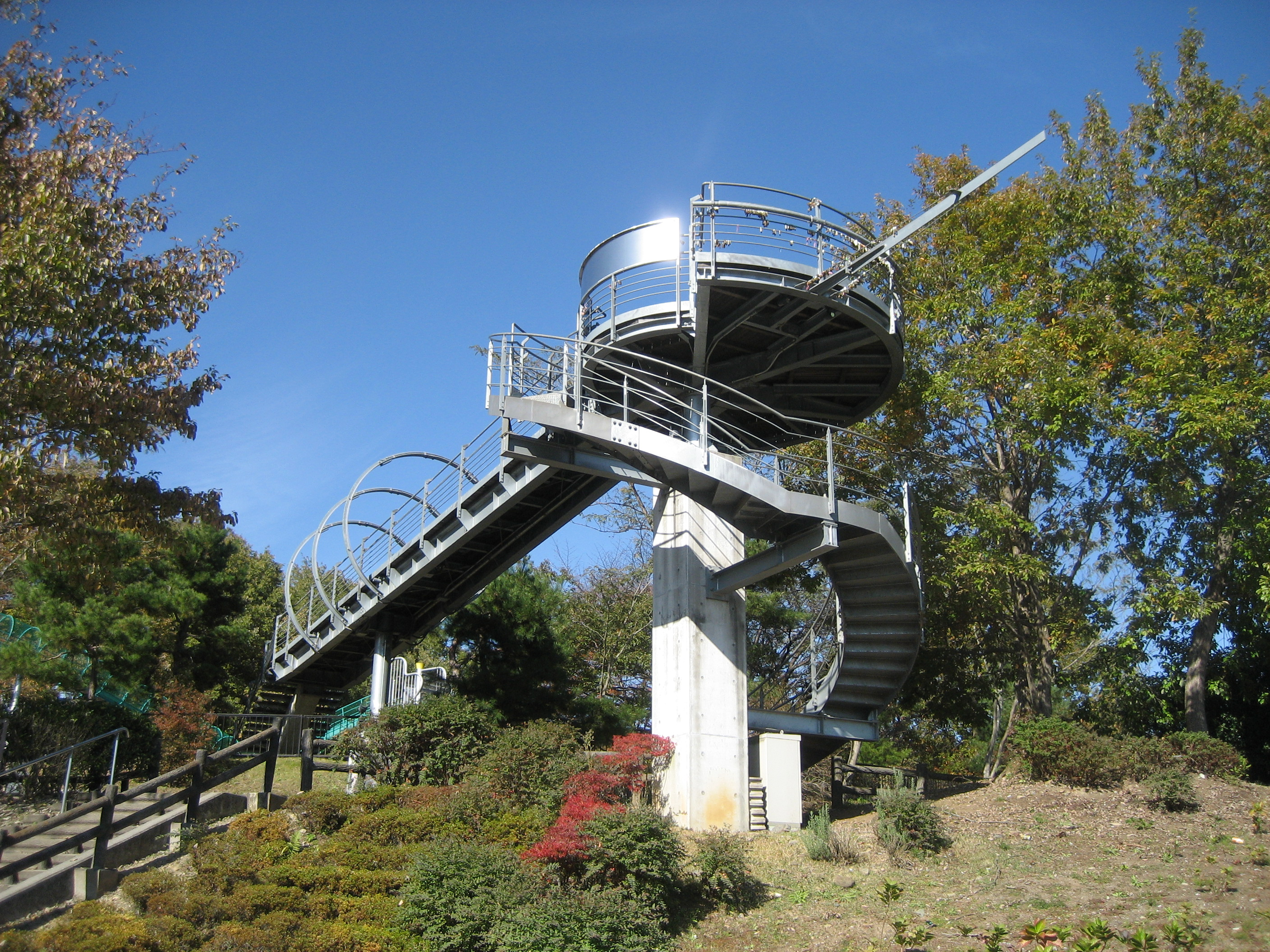
"Hill of Departure" in Chichibu, Saitama

Oricon praised the song for its three-part mixed chorus, calling it "an impressive melody that grows stronger toward the end".

"Hill of Departure", a monument was built in dedication of the song in Chichibu, Saitama. In November 2011, following the 20th anniversary of the song, Kojima was awarded the Saitama Prefecture Merit Award posthumously—he died earlier that year on January 20—alongside Takahashi.

== See also ==
- List of graduation songs
- Hotaru no Hikari
- Ichinensei Ni Nattara
