= Caterina Vannini =

Italian mystic

Servant of God Caterina Vannini OP
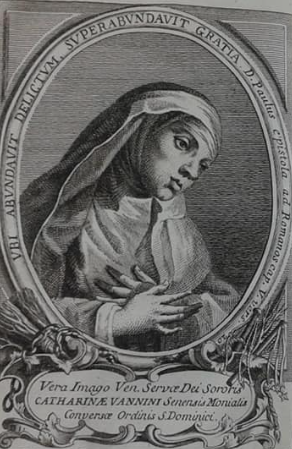
- Born: 26 October 1543; Siena, Kingdom of Italy
- Died: 30 July 1606 (aged 62); Siena, Kingdom of Italy

Caterina Vannini (c. 1560 – 30 July 1609) was a former prostitute, who, in Rome, became a well-connected mystic and Dominican order nun, and befriended cardinal Federico Borromeo.

== Biography ==
Vannini was born to a poor family living in via Tommaso Pendola in Siena. Starting as a teenage girl, she earned money as a prostitute, possibly at the goading of her family, and moved to Rome, where she appears to have functioned as a courtesan, under the pseudonym of Taide senese (the name of the prostitute lover of Trason in Terence's comedy The Eunuch). Some sources claim she may have been a model for Mary Magdalen in one of Caravaggio's paintings, perhaps Martha and Mary Magdalen.

For the Jubilee of 1574, Pope Gregory XIII attempted to clear prostitutes from the streets of Rome, and Caterina was incarcerated. The punishment decreed was either marriage or entrance into a monastery of convertite. She somehow fled to Siena in 1575. She began reading about early Christian hermits and the life of the mystic Saint Catherine of Ricci, until one Sunday in Lent, in the church Sant'Agostino she entered a spiritual crisis. She had all her hair shorn and sold all her possessions for charity.

In 1584, she was admitted as third order Dominican nun attached to the monastery of the convertite associated with what is now the Chiesa della Maria Santissima del Rosario located on via del Pignattello in Siena. She befriended the cardinal Borromeo, and maintained a long correspondence with him He visited her in 1604 and 1605.

In 1606, she published an instruction manual for reciting the Rosary: Modo per eccitare e ammaestrare li semplici e poco esperti a recitar con qualche frutto il S. S. Rosario dettato dalla madre Suor Caterina Vannini da Siena, monaca Convertita, published by tipografia Luca Bonetti in Siena. Federico Borromeo would write her biography in I tre libri della Vita di Suor Caterina monaca convertita, Milan, 1618). Her cause for beatification was introduced in 1701, but the process came to naught.
