= Manfredo Settala =

Milanese scientist and museum founder

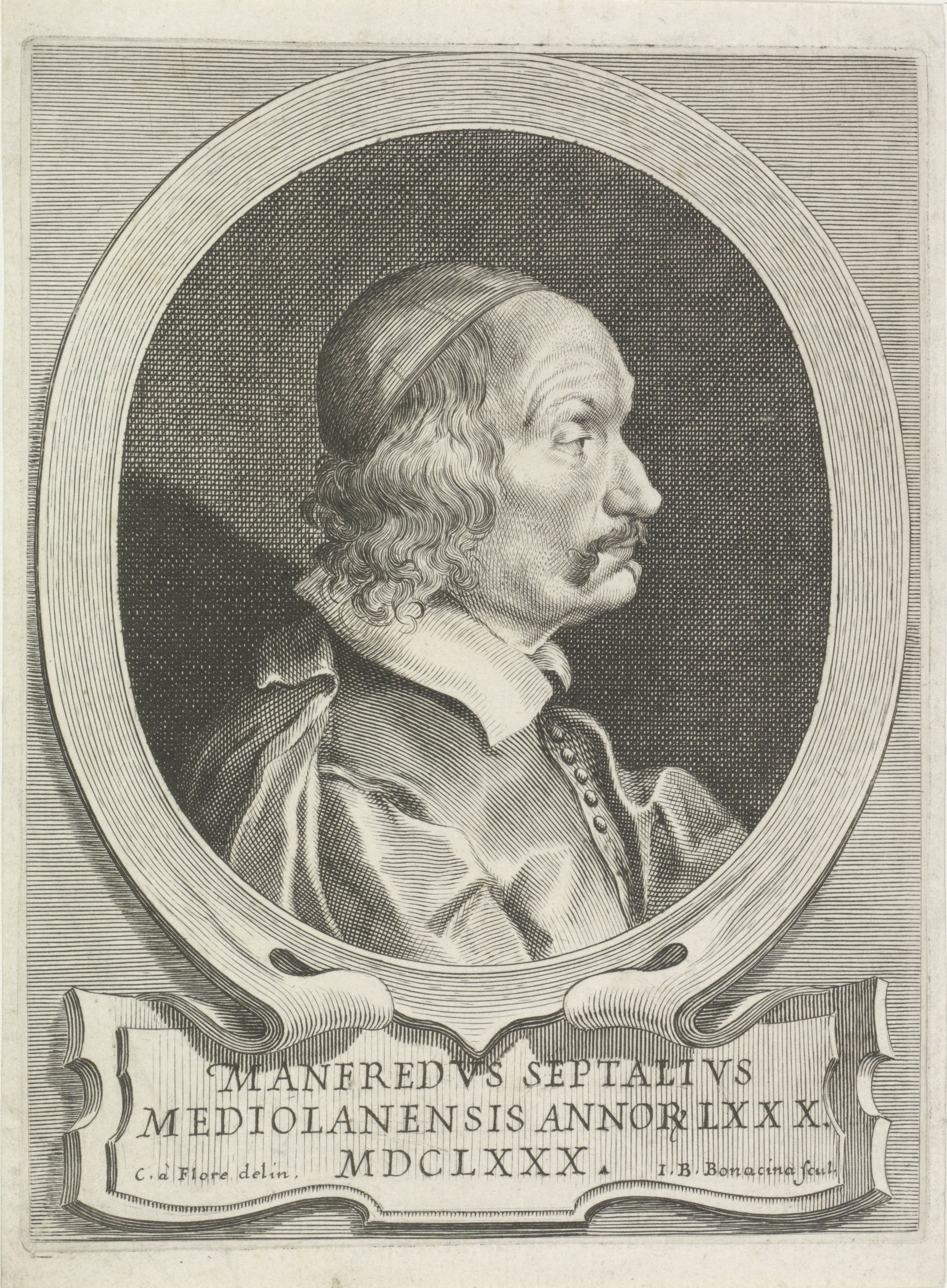
- Manfredo Settala
- Born: March 8, 1600; Milan, Duchy of Milan
- Died: February 6, 1680 (aged 79); Milan, Duchy of Milan
- Occupations: Canon, collector
- Known for: Musaeum Septalianum
- Parent(s): Ludovico Settala and Angela Settala (née Arona)

Manfredo Settala (Italian: [maɱˈfreːdo setˈtaːla]; 1600–1680), son of the physician Ludovico Settala (1552–1633), was an Italian cleric and scientist. A friend of Cassiano dal Pozzo, he created in Milan the Settala Museum – one of the world's earliest natural history museums.

== Biography ==
Manfredo Settala studied at the universities of Pisa and Siena, where he befriended Fabio Chigi (the future Pope Alexander VII). He received degrees in law and languages, but he devoted himself to a study of the sciences – mathematical, physical, and mechanical. His studies at Pisa had aroused in him an interest in optics and he learned to grind his own scientific mirrors and lenses and to construct optical instruments which he used in his own studies.

In his youth he traveled extensively in Italy and foreign countries to collect antiquities, works of art, and other rarities. After his return to Italy in 1629, Cardinal Federico Borromeo ordained him canon of San Nazaro in Brolo, a church near the family palace on Via Pantano. This appointment enabled him to spend the rest of his life studying various scientific subjects. An engineer and inventor, he became particularly well known for his self-made optical and mechanical instruments, e.g., parabolic mirrors.

In 1655 Settala traveled to Rome to witness the election of his friend Fabio Chigi as Pope Alexander VII, partially in the hope that papal benediction of his museum would increase its size and prestige; he took advantage of this trip to initiate his relationship with the German Jesuit polymath Athanasius Kircher.

Manfredo Settala was Henry Oldenburg's Milanese correspondent. Settala also corresponded with Antonio Magliabechi and Francesco Redi. On 3 October 1667 it was proposed that he should be elected a Fellow of the Royal Society, but a decision was deferred until the next meeting, at which, however, the question was not raised again.

Manfredo Settala died in Milan on February 6, 1680.

== Musaeum Septalianum ==
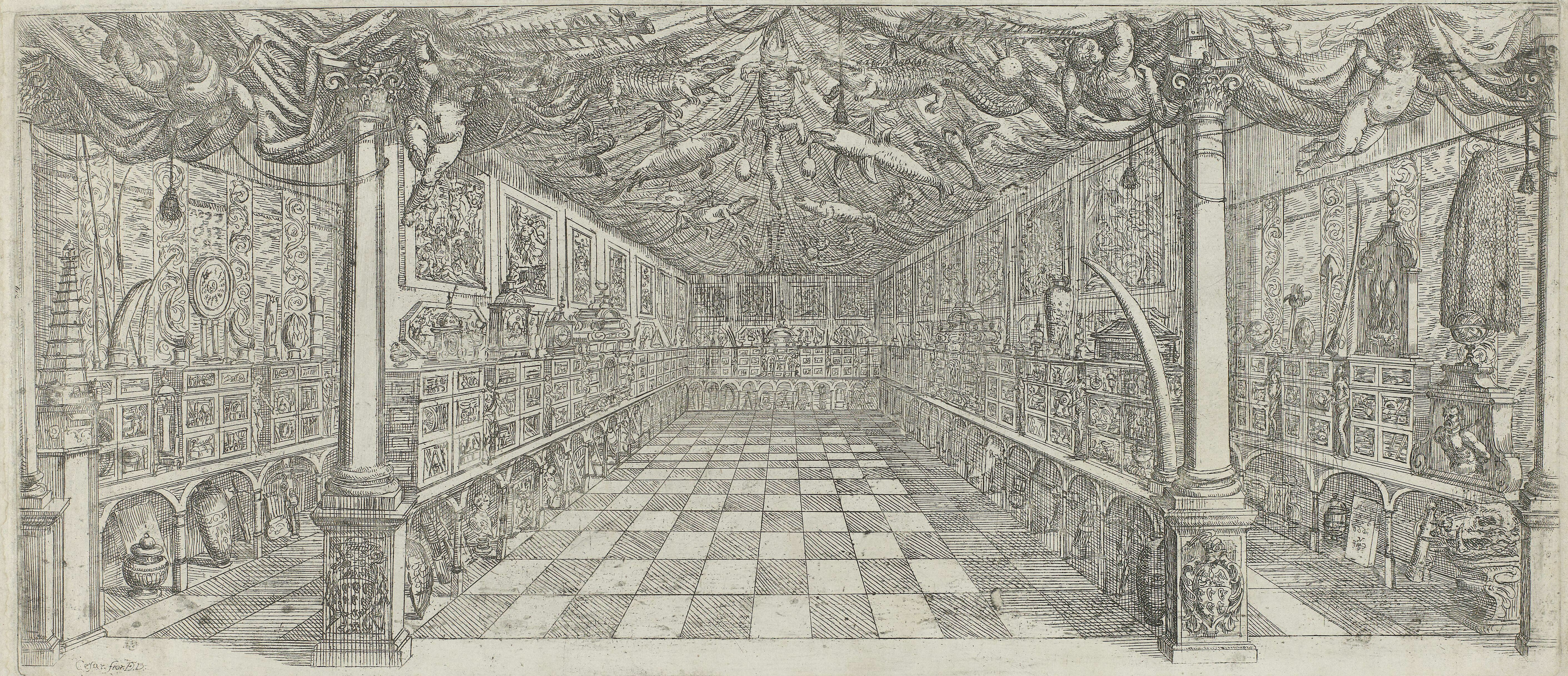
Manfredo Settala's Cabinet of curiosities. From "Museo, ò Galeria" (1666).

Manfredo was inspired to form his own collection at the age of fifteen after a visit to the Ducal Palace at Mantua, where he saw incredible treasures. He accumulated numerous archeological relics, paintings, manuscripts and curiosities, which were displayed to visiting scholars. In pursuit of his scientific endeavors, he installed a laboratory as an adjunct to his museum in which he conducted experiments. Settala purchased large numbers of clocks, mathematical and astronomical instruments, and experimental physics apparatus, which were exhibited in his museum in addition to numerous mechanisms, instruments and devices of his own design and construction.

The museum created by Manfredo Settala was in its day one of the most important cultural institutions in Milan and was internationally famous. It was housed in the family residence, the Palazzo Settala, which today is 26, via Pantano. The palazzo in via Pantano of this “Italian Archimedes”, as Manfredo was called, was frequented by foreign visitors throughout the year. A visit by Nicolas Steno to Settala in the summer 1671 was recorded by Paolo Maria Terzago, who described how Steno performed a dissection in the house of Settala. John Evelyn, Balthasar de Monconys and Philip Skippon visited the museum during their journey to Italy. Visitors such as the German physicist Ehrenfried Walther von Tschirnhaus, one of the pioneers of porcelain manufacture in Europe, traveled to Milan specifically to meet Settala and discuss his inventions with him.

Manfredo bequeathed his collection of objects of natural history, instruments of various sorts, and pictures, to the Ambrosian Library. This will, however, was not carried out ipso facto, for the Canon had many nephews and nieces who had their own views on the matter, one of them in particular, Maria Settala, who had married one of the Crevenna family, refusing to give up what she considered her rights and was only satisfied when she had removed some of the pictures. It was not till 1751 that Canon Manfredo's legacy was confirmed by a decree of the Senate of Milan, which consigned the collection to the Ambrosian Library, and where 70 years after the testator's death it was duly installed. The Settala collection was destroyed during World War II. Some objects from Settala’s collection, however, still survive in various Italian museums.

Manfredo Settala's collection was cataloged and described by the Italian physicist and philosopher Paolo Maria Terzago (1610–1695). Terzago's catalogue was published in Latin in 1664 and in Italian translation in 1666; another Italian edition appeared in 1677. The Ambrosian Library preserves an original manuscript inventory of the collection. The collection was composed by museum, workshop, library and art gallery. The library was tightly connected with Settala's interests: optics, mathematics, ethnography, and travels. The art gallery included several works by prominent Renaissance artists, such as Fede Galizia, Raphael, Brueghel, and Leonardo da Vinci. The museum consisted of about 3000 pieces, including scientific instruments, objects made from glass and metal, cameos, medals, and various chemical preparations. It contained a full range of natural and man-made items: zoological and mineral specimens; products of the vegetable kingdom; objects from America, Asia, and Africa: silver from Potosí, porcelain from China, Chinese and Japanese texts written in ideograms and Egyptian mummies; weapons; musical instruments; and a significant number of archeological materials and ancient coins. Figured stones and skeletons were on display, as were automata, burning glasses and perpetual-motion devices.

== Bibliography ==
- Picinelli, Filippo (1670). Ateneo dei letterati milanesi. Milan: Francesco Vigone. pp. 406–408.
- Fogolari, Gino (1900). "Il Museo Settala". Archivio Storico Lombardo. 3. 14: 58–126.
- Byrne, Maurice (1965). "Instruments by Claude Rafi in the Collection of Manfredo Settala". The Galpin Society Journal. 18: 126–127. doi:10.2307/841988. JSTOR 841988.
- Tavernari, Carla (1976). "Manfredo Settala collezionista e scienziato milanese del '600". Annali dell'Istituto e Museo di Storia della Scienza di Firenze. I (1): 43–61. doi:10.1163/221058776X00057.
- Frank P. Bär, "Museum oder Wunderkammer? Die Musikinstrumentensammlung Manfredo Settalas im Mailand des 17. Jahrhunderts," in Für Aug' und Ohr: Musik in Kunst- und Wunderkammern, ed. W. Seipel ([Vienna], 1999), 59–71.
- Olmi, Giuseppe (2003). "Settala, Manfredo". Grove Art Online. Oxford University Press. doi:10.1093/gao/9781884446054.article.T077824.
- Settis, Salvatore (2015). "La «Wunderkammer» di Milano". Il Sole 24 Ore.
- Facchin, Laura (2017). "Intorno al museo di Manfredo Settala: memorie illustrate e celebri amicizie". Storia e Storiografia dell'arte Dal Rinascimento al Barocco in Europa e Nelle Americhe. Metodologia, Critica, Casi di Studio. Rome: 201–227.
