= Hotaru no Hikari =

Japanese song incorporating the tune of Auld Lang Syne

The first verse of the song

Hotaru no Hikari (蛍の光; meaning "Glow of a firefly") is a Japanese song incorporating the tune of Scottish folk song Auld Lang Syne with completely different lyrics by Chikai Inagaki, first introduced in a collection of singing songs for elementary school students in 1881 (Meiji 14). The swapping of lyrics without substantial change to the music is known as contrafactum. The words describe a series of images of hardships that the industrious student endures in his relentless quest for knowledge, starting with the firefly's light, which the student uses to keep studying when he has no other light sources (originating from the story of Che Yin from Volume 83 of the Book of Jin). It is commonly heard during graduation ceremonies and at the end of the school day. Many stores and restaurants play it to usher customers out at the end of a business day. On the very popular Japanese New Year's Eve TV show, NHK's Kōhaku Uta Gassen, it has become a tradition for all the performers to sing Hotaru no Hikari as the last song. From 1993 until 2020, this was also played at Tokyo Disney Resort during fireworks shows on New Year's Eve. Another song from the same period and used at graduation ceremonies thought to be based on a Scottish folk song is "Aogeba Tōtoshi".

== Lyrics ==
Verse	Japanese text	Romaji	English translation
1	螢の光、窗の雪、 書讀む月日、重ねつゝ。 何時しか年も、すぎの戸を、 開けてぞ今朝は、別れ行く。	Hotaru no hikari, mado no yuki, Fumi yomu tsukihi, kasane tsutsu Itsushika toshi mo, sugi no to wo, Aketezo kesa wa, wakare yuku.	Light of fireflies, (moonlight reflected off) snow by the window. Many days and months spent reading. Before one knows it, years have passed. The door we resolutely open; this morning, we part ways.
2	止まるも行くも、限りとて、 互に思う、千萬の。 心の端を、一言に、 幸くと許り、歌うなり。	Tomaru mo yuku mo, kagiri tote, Katami ni omou, chiyorodzu no, Kokoro no hashi wo, hitokoto ni, Sakiku to bakari, utau nari.	Stay or leave, either an end Mutually, countless thoughts from the bottom of the heart, expressed in one word a wish for peace, we sing.
3	築紫の極み、陸の奧、 海山遠く、隔つとも。 その眞心は、隔て無く、 一つに盡くせ、國の爲。	Tsukushi no kiwami, michi no oku, Umi yama tooku, hedatsu tomo, Sono magokoro wa, hedate naku, Hitotsu ni tsukuse, kuni no tame	Far reaches of Kyushu and Tōhoku; Though separated by seas and mountains Our sincere hearts are separated not Serving single-mindedly for country.
4	千島の奥も、沖繩も、 八洲の内の、護りなり。 至らん國に、勲しく、 努めよ我が背、恙無く。	Chishima no oku mo, Okinawa mo Yashima no uchi no, mamori nari Itaran kuni ni, isaoshiku Tsutome yo waga se, tsutsuganaku	From the ends of Chishima to Okinawa, We protect all part of Japan. Contributing to our great country, I'll faithfully devote my life.

== See also ==
- Tabidachi no Hi ni
