= Ludovico Settala =

Italian physician

Doctor Ludovico Settala
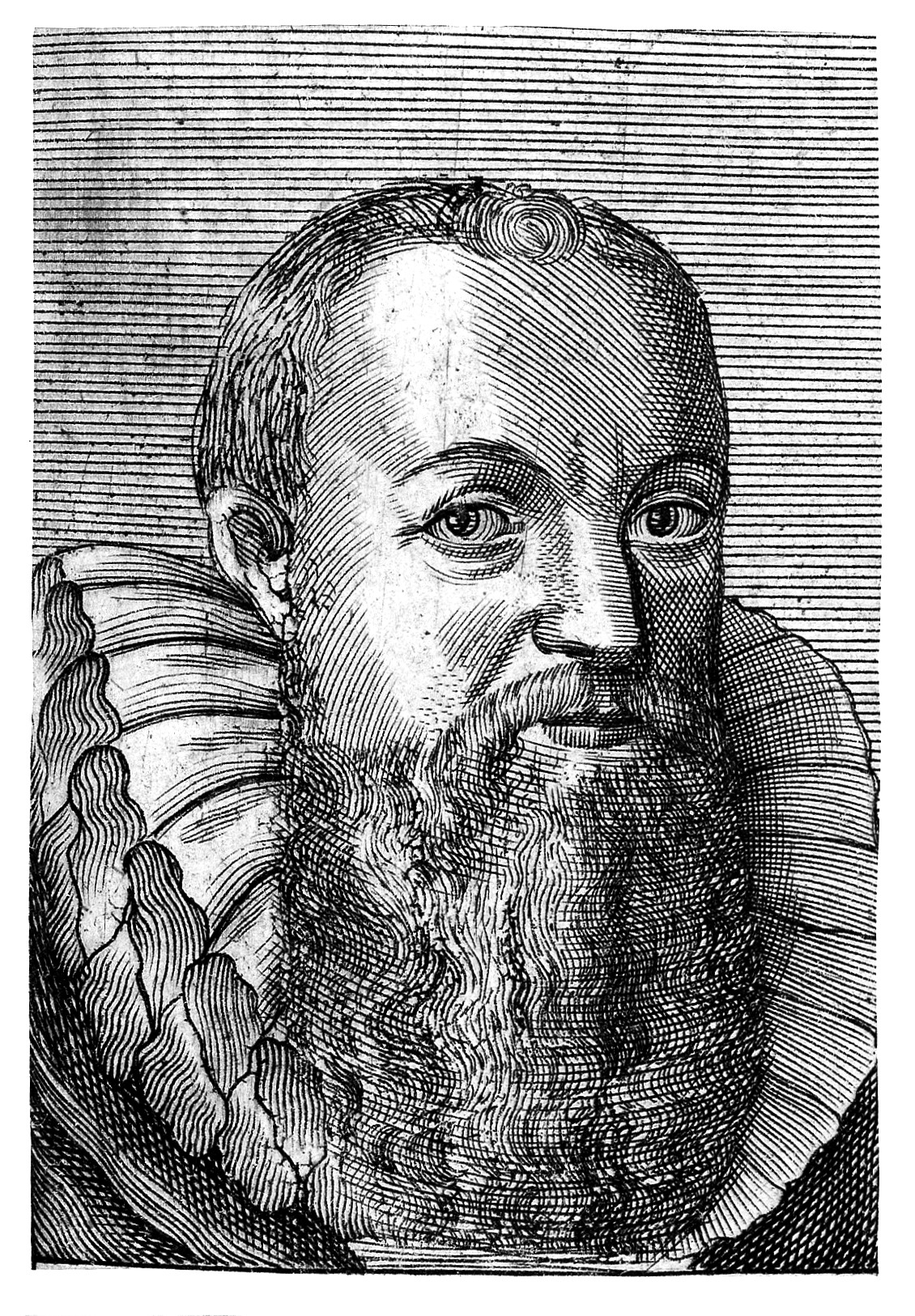
- Portrait of Ludovico Settala (Septalius)
- Born: 27 February 1552; Milan, Duchy of Milan
- Died: 12 September 1633 (aged 81); Milan, Duchy of Milan
- Resting place: San Nazaro in Brolo
- Education: University of Pavia
- Occupations: Physician, philosopher, Renaissance humanist
- Known for: his role in controlling the Great Plague of Milan of 1629–1631
- Spouse: Angela Arona
- Children: Manfredo Settala
- Parent(s): Francesco Settala and Giulia Settala (née Ripa)
- Scientific career
- Fields: Public health
- Workplaces: University of Pavia; Scuole canobiane

Ludovico Settala (Italian: [ludoˈviːko setˈtaːla]; also known by his Latin name of Ludovicus Septalius; 27 February 1552 – 12 September 1633) was an Italian physician who lived during the Renaissance.

== Biography ==
Ludovico Settala was born in Milan on 27 February 1552, the son of Francesco Settala and Giulia Ripa. He studied the humanities with Antonio Maria Venosta and philosophy at the Jesuit school in his native city. At the early age of 16 he submitted his graduation thesis. He then enrolled in the University of Pavia where he studied medicine under Paolo Cigalini, a student of Gabriele Falloppio. After obtaining a doctorate in philosophy and medicine in 1573, he began writing on some contradictory passages in Hippocrates and Galen, but this work was interrupted when he was appointed professor of clinical medicine at the University of Pavia. Three years later he resigned his professorship to devote himself entirely to medical practice in Milan. When in 1576 an epidemic of bubonic plague broke out in Milan, Settala played a leading part in fighting the disease and in aiding its victims. He put his experience of the 1576 plague to good use in his treatise De peste et pestiferis affectibus printed in 1622.

He attained to such renown that Philip III of Spain offered him a post as historiographer, and he was tendered professorships at Ingolstadt, Pisa, Bologna, and Padua, all of which honors he refused. From 1605 onward he taught moral and political philosophy in the municipal Scuole Canobiane. In 1627, Settala was nominated by Philip IV to the post of physician-general to the Duchy of Milan. Settala was honored by Alessandro Manzoni in chapter thirty-one of I promessi sposi (The Betrothed, 1827), as "one of the most active and intrepid doctors" during the terrible days of the Great Plague of Milan. During the plague he was himself struck down and subsequently suffered a stroke that left him paralysed on one side of the body. He died in Milan at the age of 81 on 12 September 1633, and was buried in the church of San Nazaro in Brolo.

Settala had established a cabinet of curiosities in his palace on the Via Pantano in Milan. It encompassed the full range of the fine arts and numismatics, a small collection of medicinal plants and related materials, and a comprehensive library of rare books and manuscripts. After his death his son Manfredo took charge of the collection and became one of the great collectors of seventeenth-century Europe.

== Works ==
A prolific writer, Settala's chief works are Animadversionum et cautionum medicarum libri IX (1614), the result of 40 years of practice, which went through several editions, and De peste et pestiferis adfectibus (1622). He also wrote on moles and nevi (1606) and spoke of the sympathetic relation between the skin of the face and the rest of the body. Settala's 1,200-page commentary on Aristotle's Problemata was one of 1,500 books in the Library of Sir Thomas Browne.

== List of works ==
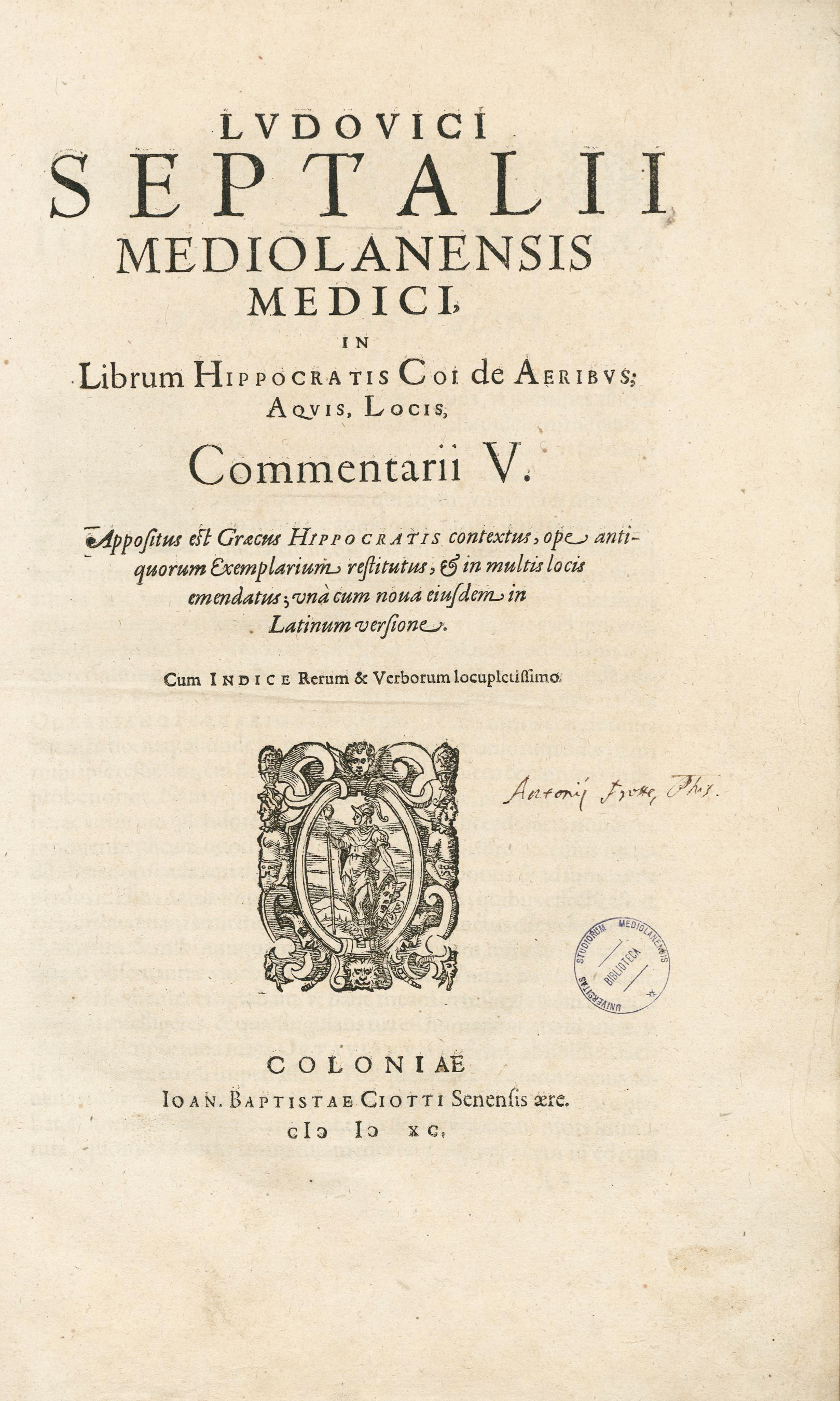
In Librum Hippocratis Coi de aeribus, aquis, locis Commentarii V. Colonia. Giovanni Battista Ciotti. 1590.

- Settala, Ludovico (1590). In Librum Hippocratis Coi de aeribus, aquis, locis Commentarii V. appositus est graecus Hippocratis contextus ... restitutus et ... emendatus, una cum nova eiusdem in Latinum versione (in Latin). Colonia: Giovanni Battista Ciotti.
- Settala, Ludovico (1602). Ludovici Septalii Patricii Mediolanensis Commentariorum in Aristotelis Problemata (in Latin). Vol. 1. septem primas sectiones continens, ab eodem Latine factas. Francoforte: Apud Claudium Marnium & heredes Ioannis Aubrii.
- Settala, Ludovico (1607). Ludovici Septalii Patricii Mediolanensis Commentariorum in Aristotelis Problemata (in Latin). Vol. 2. secundam heptadem continens, ab eodem Latine factam. Francoforte: Apud Claudium Marnium & heredes Ioannis Aubrii.
- Animaduersionum, & cautionum medicarum libri septem. Quorum materiam sequens pagina indicabit, Mediolani: apud Io. Bapt. Bidell., 1614.
- De peste, & pestiferis affectibus. Libri quinque, Mediolani: apud Ioannem Baptistam Bidellium, 1622.
- Ludouici Septalij patrici et medici Mediolanensis, De ratione instituendae, & gubernandae familiae. Libri quinque. Senator F. edidit, & Iulio Aresio Senatus Mediolanensis principi dicauit, Mediolani: apud Io. Baptistam Bidellium, 1626.
- Della ragion di stato libri sette. Di Lodouico Settala. All'illustrissimo, & eccellentissimo signore Don Emanuelle de Fonseca e Zugniga, Milano: appresso Gio. Battista Bidelli, 1627.
- Cura locale de' tumori pestilentiali, che sono il bubone, l'antrace, o carboncolo, & i furoncoli. Contenente tutto quello, che si ha da fare esteriormente nella cura di questi mali. Tolta dal libro della cura della peste. Del signor profisico Lodouico Settala, Milano: per Giouan Battista Bidelli, 1629.
- Preseruatione dalla peste scritta dal sig. protomedico Lodouico Settala, Brescia: per Bartholomeo Fontana, 1630.
- Settala, Ludovico (1632). Commentaria in Aristotelis Problemata (in Latin). Lugduni: Sumptibus Claudi Landry.
- Antidotario romano latino, et volgare tradotto da Hippolito Cesarelli romano. Con l'aggionta dell'elettione de semplici, e prattica delle compositioni. E di due trattati, vno della teriaca romana, ... l'altro della teriaca egittia. Aggiontoui in questa vltima impressione le auertenze, & osseruationi appartenenti alla compositione de medicamenti del sig. Lodovico Settala, Milano: per Gio. Battista Bidelli, 1635.
- Auertenze, et osseruationi appartenenti al curar le ferite, tradotte dall'ottavo libro delle osseruationi del signor Ludouico Settala, da Alessandro Tadino, Milano: per Gio. Pietro Cardi, 1641.
- Breue compendio per curare ogni sorte de tumori esterni, & cutanee turpitudini, raccolto dalle osseruationi fisice, & chirurgice nelli vltimi anni fatte dal sig. Lodouico Settala medico collegiato. D'Alessandro Tadino medico collegiato, Milano: per Lodouico Monza: ad instan. di Altobello Pisani, 1646.
- Ludovici Septalii mediolanensis, Opera de ratione familiae cum instituendae, tum gubernandae libri V et De ratione status libris VII, Editio nova, Ulmae: prostat apud Jo. Frid. Gaum, 1755.

== Bibliography ==
- Picinelli, Filippo (1670). Ateneo dei letterati milanesi. Milan: Vigone. pp. 398–9.
- Corte, Bartolomeo (1718). Notizie istoriche intorno a medici scrittori milanesi. Milan. pp. 137–146.
- Argelati, Filippo (1745). Bibliotheca scriptorum mediolanensium seu acta, et elogia virorum omnigena eruditione illustrium, qui in metropoli Insubriae, oppidisque circumjacentibus orti sunt. Vol. II. Milan. pp. 1321–1328.
- Tiraboschi, Girolamo (1810). Storia della letteratura italiana, parte seconda ("Dall'anno 1500 all'anno 1600") (in Italian). Vol. Tomo VII, capo III, par. XLI. Firenze: Presso Molini, Landi, e Company. pp. 681–83.
- Chalmers, Alexander (1816). "Septalius, or Settala (Louis)". The General Biographical Dictionary. Vol. 27. London: J. Nichols. pp. 342–343. This article incorporates text from this source, which is in the public domain.
- Sangiorgio, Paolo (1831). F. Longhena (ed.). Cenni storici sulle due università di Pavia e di Milano e notizie intorno ai più celebri medici, chirurghi e speziali di Milano dal ritorno delle scienze sino all'anno 1816. Opera postuma. Milan. pp. 258–272.
- De Renzi, Salvatore (1845). Storia della medicina italiana. Vol. III. Naples. pp. 509–510.
- Ferrario, Ercole (1857). Intorno alla vita ed alle opere mediche di Ludovico Settala. Cenni. Milan.
- Capparoni, Pietro (1928). Profili biobibliografici di medici e naturalisti celebri italiani dal sec. XV al sec. XVIII. Vol. II. Rome. pp. 131–133.
- Treves, Paolo (1930). "La politica aristotelica di Lodovico Settala". Civiltà moderna: 588–621.
- La Cava, Angelo Francesco (1945). La peste di S. Carlo. Note storico mediche sulla peste del 1576. Milan. pp. 52–55.
- Rota Ghibaudi, Silvia (1959). Ricerche su Ludovico Settala. Florence: Sansoni.
- Ferro, Filippo Maria (1831). La peste nella cultura lombarda. Milan. pp. 89–91.
- Diffley, P. (2002). "Settala, Lodovico". The Oxford Companion to Italian Literature. Oxford University Press. ISBN 978-0-19-818332-7.
- Cosmacini, Giorgio (2009). Il medico e il cardinale. Milan. passim.
- Zaggia, Massimo (2014). "Culture in Lombardy, ca. 1535–1706". A Companion to Late Medieval and Early Modern Milan. pp. 190–213. doi:10.1163/9789004284128_010. ISBN 9789004284128.
- Facchin, Laura. "Ludovico Settala: un intellettuale barocco fra scienza e arte". European Network for Baroque Cultural Heritage.
