= Château de Tarascon =

15th-century castle in France

- Part of Tarascon, France
- Bouches-du-Rhône
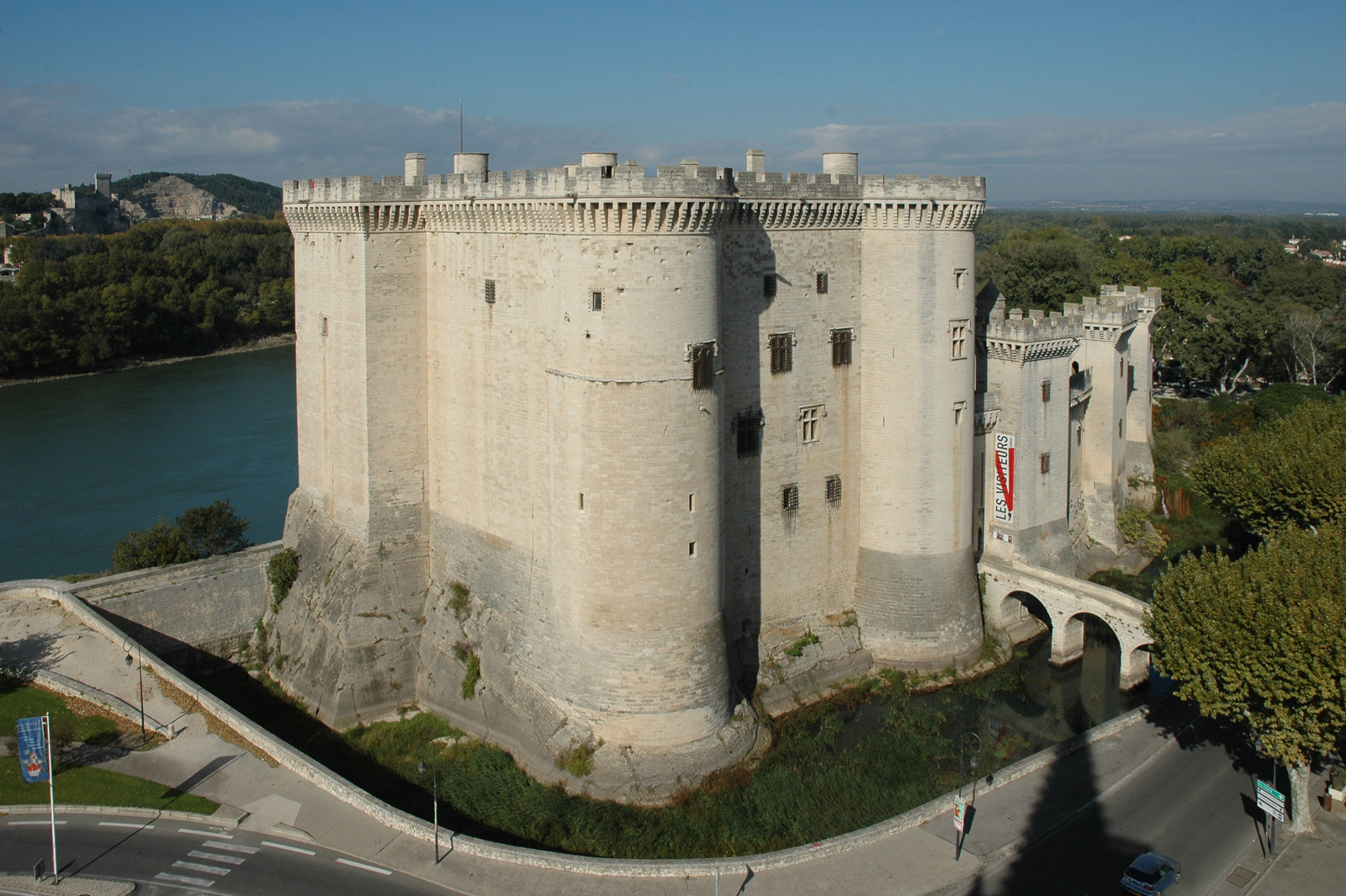

Site information
- Type: Castle
- Owner: City of Tarascon
- Open to the public: Yes
- Condition: Excellent condition

Location
- Coordinates: 43.8066°N 4.65503°E

Site history
- Built: 1010 (First castle); 1401 (Second castle)
- Built by: Louis II of Anjou
- In use: Late 15th century – 1926
- Materials: Limestone
- Events: Hundred Years' War

Monument historique
- Official name: Château de Tarascon
- Type: Classé
- Designated: 1840
- Reference no.: PA00081473

The Château de Tarascon (Provençal: Castèu de Tarascon) is a medieval castle in Tarascon in the Bouches-du-Rhône department of the south of France. The fortress stands on the banks of the Rhône opposite Château de Beaucaire, and near St Martha's Collegiate Church and ensured the security of the western border of Provence. Destroyed and rebuilt in the first half of the 15th century in a combination of Gothic and Renaissance styles, the fortress was a venue for events, meetings, and celebrations for King René before being converted into a military prison at the end of the 18th century. Today, the structure stands as one of the best preserved castles in the world and has been classified as a national historic site since 1840.

== History ==
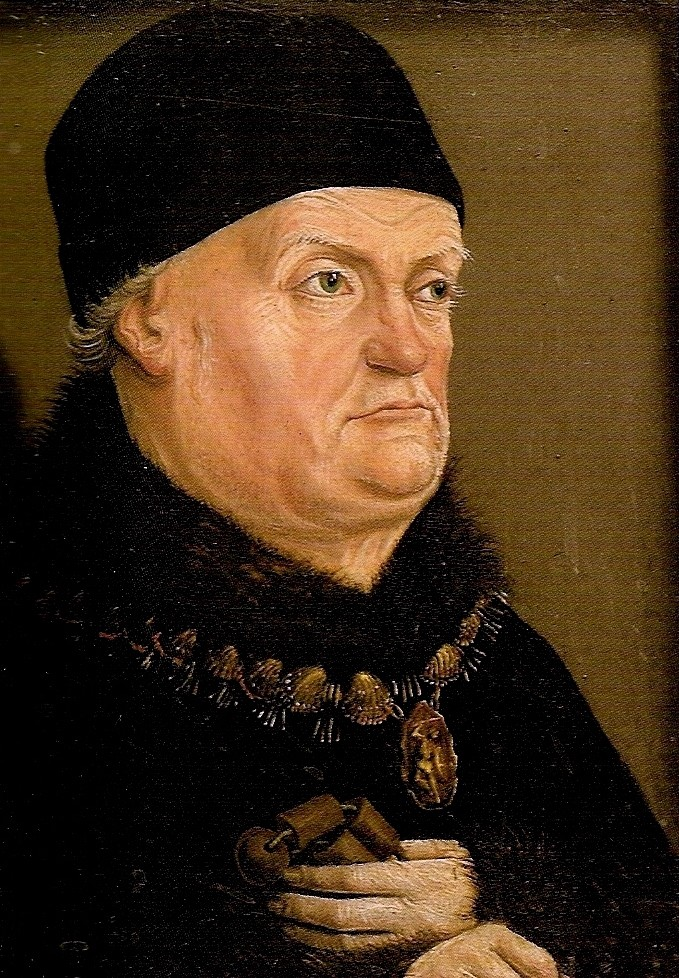
René of Anjou

=== First castle ===
To defend against enemy attacks and gain control of the Rhône river, the first castle was constructed by Roubaud II, Marquis of Provence between 994 and 1010 over the ruins of a Roman castrum. Severely damaged in an uprising by burghers siding with the Counts of Toulouse in 1232, the castle was rebuilt and occupied by Charles of Anjou, Count of Provence and extensively renovated to its current layout by his son Charles II. Seeking to take advantage of the absence of Queen Jeanne, Countess of Provence and the departure of Pope Urban V to Rome, Duke Louis of Anjou, governor of Languedoc appointed Bertrand Du Guesclin, who had just been freed in December 1367 after his capture at the Battle of Nájera to capture Tarascon. Du Guesclin set out on 26 February 1368 with 2,000 men and laid siege to Tarascon on 4 March 1368, organizing a blockade surrounding the entire city. Greatly outnumbered in strength and number, Tarascon surrendered on 20 or 22 March 1368, but was recaptured in 1370 by the bands of Raimond VIII de Turenne. In response to the new prince of Provence Louis II making his entry into the region after the murder of lord Charles Duras in 1386, the citizens of Tarascon engaged in a civil war, leaving the castle and town completely destroyed.

=== Current castle ===
After its destruction, the Anjou family decided to rebuild the fortress, and construction was started in 1401, continued by his first son, Louis III of Anjou. Based on the Bastille in Paris, the fortress was completed in 1449 by his second son, René of Anjou and was constructed using materials from quarries at Beaucaire. In response to an unsuccessful siege in 1427, Tarascon was equipped with twenty bombards and three other artillery pieces, positioned on the terraces crowning the castle. However, the castle was only occasionally used by the king's agents until his death in 1480. Upon the death of René's heir Charles IV, the earldom of Provence was ceded to Louis XI, and the fortress lost its strategic interest both from a militaristic and as a royal residence.

The fortress would survive two more attempted sieges in 1586 and 1652 before being converted into a military prison housing prisoners of war. During the French Revolution, supporters of Maximilien Robespierre were executed inside of the fortress. Despite operating as a prison at the time, the castle was designated as a national historic monument in 1840. After the closure of the prison in 1926, the castle was acquired by the state in 1932, restored to its former state, and opened to the public as a museum. During World War II, the town of Tarascon was targeted by Allied forces in the summer of 1944, with the first bombing raid occurring on June 25th, targeting the bridges across the Rhône. Extensive damage was done to the old town, however, the castle survived the war relatively unscathed and reopened to the public after restorations.

== Features ==
Plan of the castle

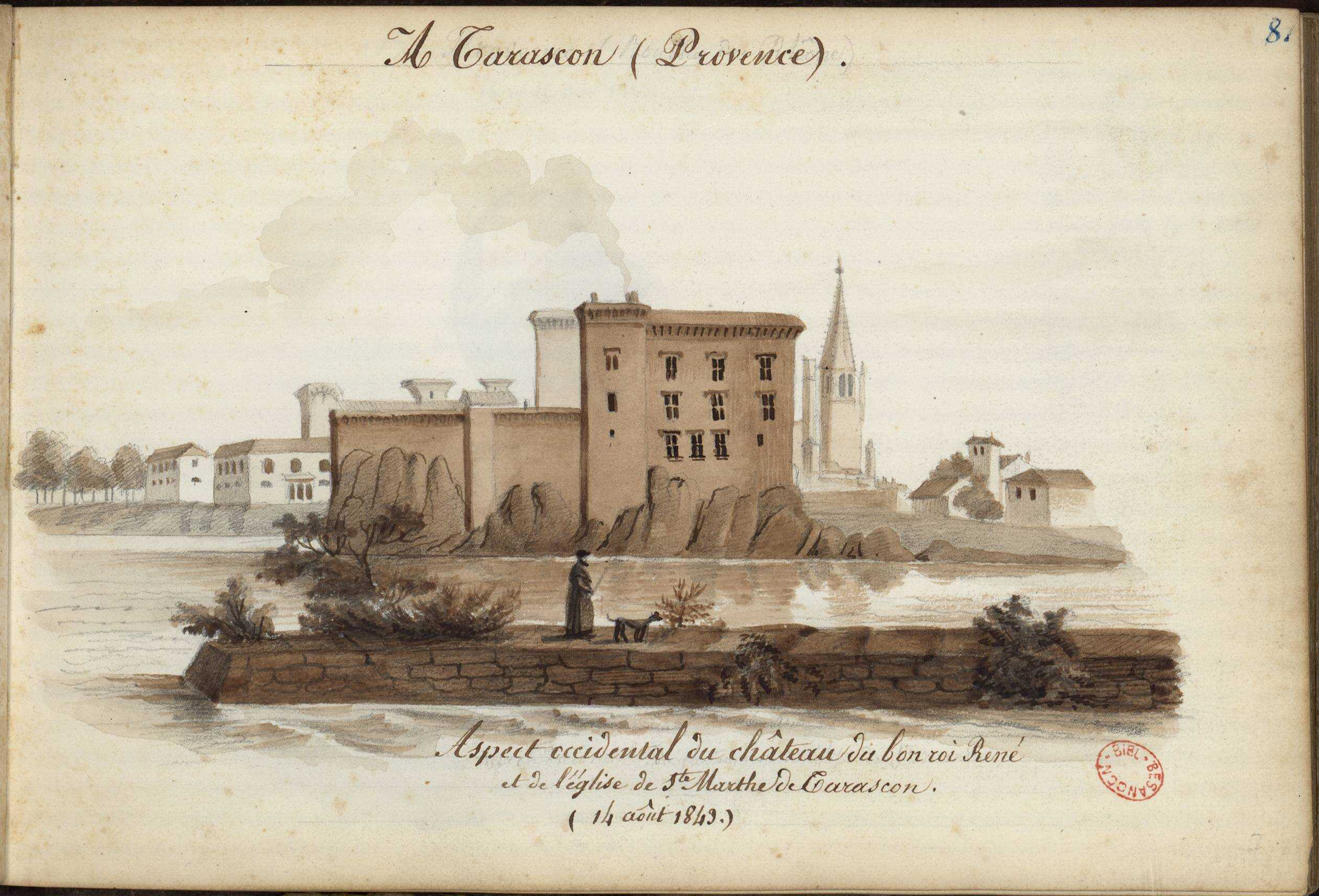
Depiction of the castle in 1849

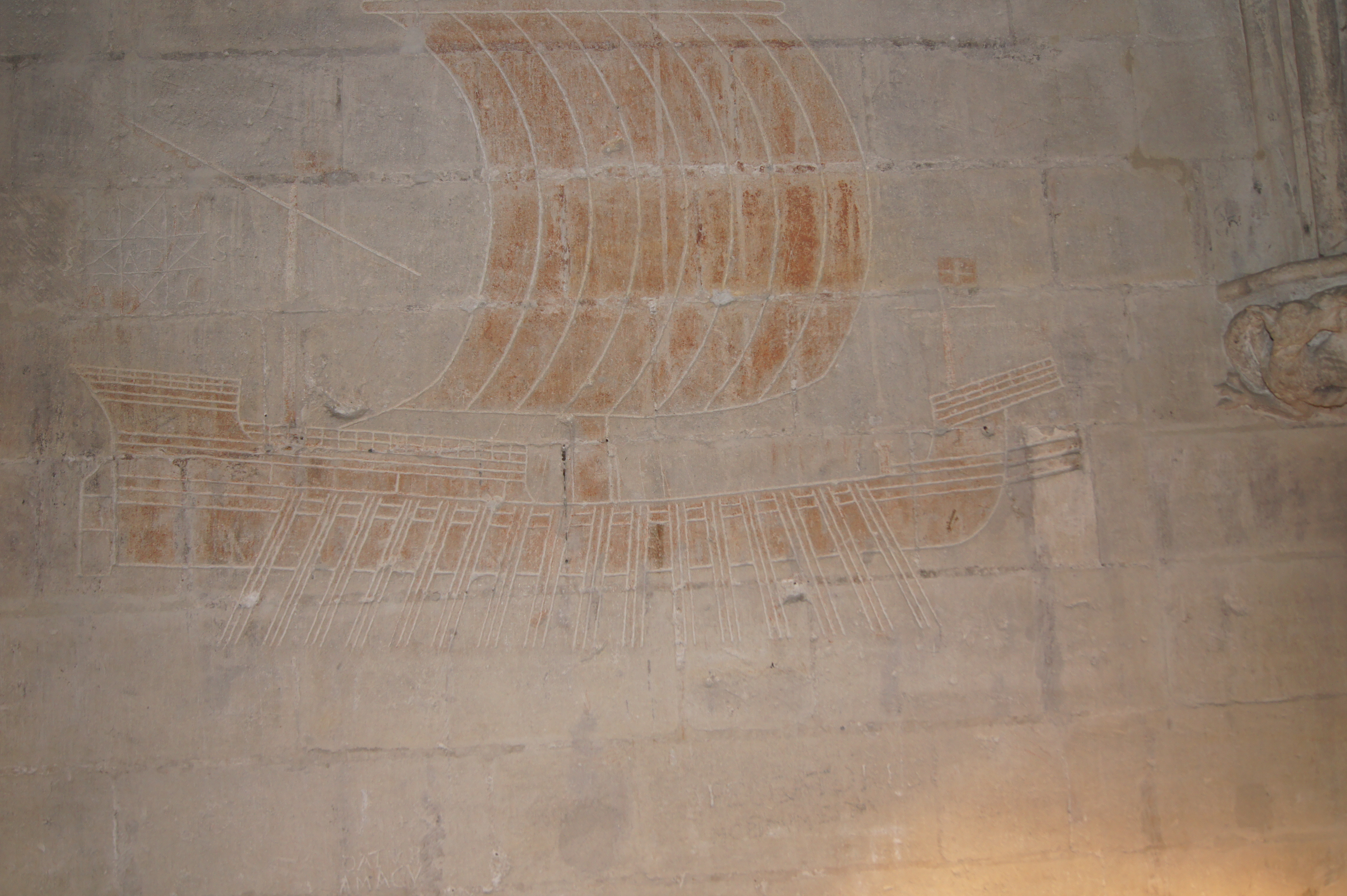
Graffiti of a galley drawn by a prisoner

The main castle and stone keep are constructed in a square-floor plan. It houses the lordly quarters, with a hall in the west wing facing the Rhone and the prince's bedchamber in the southwest tower. At the centre of the castle is the main courtyard around which the residential buildings rise, which have three floors, the first two of which have French ceilings and the last one being vaulted. They are served by spiral staircases, the main one of which is incorporated into a projecting turret clearly visible on the eastern facade of the inner courtyard. The latter is relatively small compared to the height of the buildings surrounding it. On the eastern side of this courtyard is the polygonal staircase, and on the southern facade the niche housing the busts of King René and the queen. These busts, mutilated during the Revolution, are probably the work of Francesco Laurana. The semicircular chapel tower, dating from the first half of the 15th century, owes its name to two superimposed chapels, one on the ground floor for staff, and the other on the second floor reserved for the lord. The lower chapel, or "Chapel of the Singers," is rectangular in shape and ends with a semicircular apse housed within the tower. Both bays have ribbed vaults. The choir vault has eight branches radiating from a sculpted keystone representing the Coronation of the Virgin. The upper chapel, or "Grande Chapelle," has the same dimensions. However, it is lower, and its apse has only six ribbed branches. These chapels open to the outside only through arrow slits so as not to weaken the defenses.

== In popular culture ==
The castle served as a stand-in for the Bastille in Robert Enrico's film The French Revolution (1989).

On August 23, 2020, the castle was the setting for a filming session for Guillaume Sanjorge's series Draculi & Gandolfi.

== See also ==
- Bastille
- Chateau de Beaucaire
- List of castles in France
