= Tartarin of Tarascon (1934 film) =

1934 film directed by Raymond Bernard

- Directed by: Raymond Bernard
- Written by: Raymond Bernard; Marcel Pagnol
- Based on: Tartarin of Tarascon by Alphonse Daudet
- Produced by: Bernard Natan; Emile Natan; Marcel Pagnol
- Starring: Raimu; Fernand Charpin; Jean Sinoël
- Cinematography: Jules Kruger; Robert Lefebvre
- Music by: Darius Milhaud
- Production company: Pathé-Natan
- Distributed by: Pathé-Natan
- Release date: 9 November 1934
- Running time: 95 minutes
- Country: France
- Language: French

Tartarin of Tarascon (French: Tartarin de Tarascon) is a 1934 French comedy film directed by Raymond Bernard and starring Raimu, Fernand Charpin and Jean Sinoël. It is based on the 1872 novel of the same title by Alphonse Daudet. It was shot at the Joinville Studios in Paris and on location around Beaucaire and Tarascon in Southern France and Bou Saâda in French Algeria. The film's sets were designed by the art directors Lucien Carré and Jean Perrier. It was remade as a 1962 film of the same name directed by and starring Francis Blanche.

== Cast ==
- Raimu as Tartarin
- Fernand Charpin as Bravida
- Jean Sinoël as Bézuquet
- Paul Ollivier as Costecalde
- Jean d'Yd as Ladevèze
- Marcel Maupi as Tastevin
- Louis Kerly as Castel
- Auguste Mouriès as Barbassou
- Max Andrés as Le coiffeur
- Saint-Granier as Le prince Grégori
- Milly Mathis as Jeannette
- Maximilienne as Mme Ladevèze
- Jenny Héliaas Baïa
- Blanche Poupon as Mrs. Bézuquet
- Madeleine Robinson as Une joueuse au casino

== Bibliography ==
- Bessy, Maurice & Chirat, Raymond. Histoire du cinéma français: 1929-1934. Pygmalion, 1988.
- Crisp, Colin. Genre, Myth and Convention in the French Cinema, 1929-1939. Indiana University Press, 2002.
- Goble, Alan. The Complete Index to Literary Sources in Film. Walter de Gruyter, 1999.
- Rège, Philippe. Encyclopedia of French Film Directors, Volume 1. Scarecrow Press, 2009.
