= Tartarin of Tarascon (1962 film) =

1962 film

- Directed by: Francis Blanche
- Written by: Yvan Audouard; Francis Blanche
- Based on: Tartarin of Tarascon by Alphonse Daudet
- Produced by: Georges Legrand
- Starring: Francis Blanche; Alfred Adam; Jacqueline Maillan; Michel Galabru
- Cinematography: Walter Wottitz
- Edited by: Gabriel Rongier
- Music by: Jean Leccia
- Production companies: Jad Films; Princia
- Distributed by: Les Films Fernand Rivers
- Release date: 23 November 1962
- Running time: 115 minutes
- Countries: France; Morocco
- Language: French

Tartarin of Tarascon (French: Tartarin de Tarascon) is a 1962 French-Moroccan comedy film directed by and starring Francis Blanche alongside Alfred Adam, Jacqueline Maillan and Michel Galabru. It is based on the 1872 novel Tartarin of Tarascon by Alphonse Daudet, which had previously been made into a 1934 film of the same title. It was shot at the Billancourt Studios in Paris and on location around Casablanca and Taroudant in Morocco. The film's sets were designed by the art director Louis Le Barbenchon.

== Cast ==
- Francis Blanche as Antoine Tartarin
- Alfred Adam as Prince Gregori de Montenegro
- Jacqueline Maillan as Mme Bézuquet
- Michel Galabru as Barbassou
- Annick Tanguy as Baja
- Hubert Deschamps as Ladévèze
- Camille Guérini as Victor Bombonnel
- Gaston Orbal as Bravida
- Paul Préboist as Costecade
- Michel Emer as Le pianiste
- Maryse Paillet as Berthe Fracca
- Alain Bouvette as Fracca
- Joe Sentieri as Le chanteur dans le wagon du train
- Sandra La chanteuse à la télévision
- Robert Porte as Bézuquet
- Raoul André as Le mécanicien de la locomotive
- Yvan Audouard as Un porteur
- Bourvil as Le curé qui regonfle le pneu de son vélomoteur
- Darry Cowl as L'homme en panne dans le désert
- Jean Richard as Le directeur du cirque 'Mitaine'
- Raymond Devos as Un automobiliste
- Roger Pierre as Le scout #1
- Jean-Marc Thibault as Le scout #2
- Georges de Caunes as Le radio reporter
- Henri Salvador as Le garde chasse qui se tire sur les pieds
- Albert Hugues as Tholosan - le cafetier
- Ibrahim Seck as Le propriétaire du lion aveugle
- Edith Fontaine as Jeanne - la bonne

== Bibliography ==
- Goble, Alan. The Complete Index to Literary Sources in Film. Walter de Gruyter, 1999.
