= Claude de Bectoz =

French writer and philosopher

Claude de Bectoz (1490–1547) was a French writer and philosopher of the Renaissance.

== Life ==
Both her mother, Michelette de Salvaing, and father, Jacques de Bactoz, were from well-known families in the Dauphiné. Denys Fauchier taught her to write Latin and verse. Claude would later write prose and verse in both French and Italian.

Claude became famous as a writer and intellectual and corresponded with many learned people, as well as with Marguerite de Navarre and King Francis I of France. After she became abbess of the Benedictine Monastery Saint Honorat in Tarascon in 1542, Marguerite and Francis visited her there. Francis carried her letters around with him and would show them to ladies of his court.
