= Église Sainte-Marthe de Tarascon =

Church in Tarascon, France

Coordinates: 43.805614°N 4.656084°E

Collégiale Sainte Marthe de Tarascon
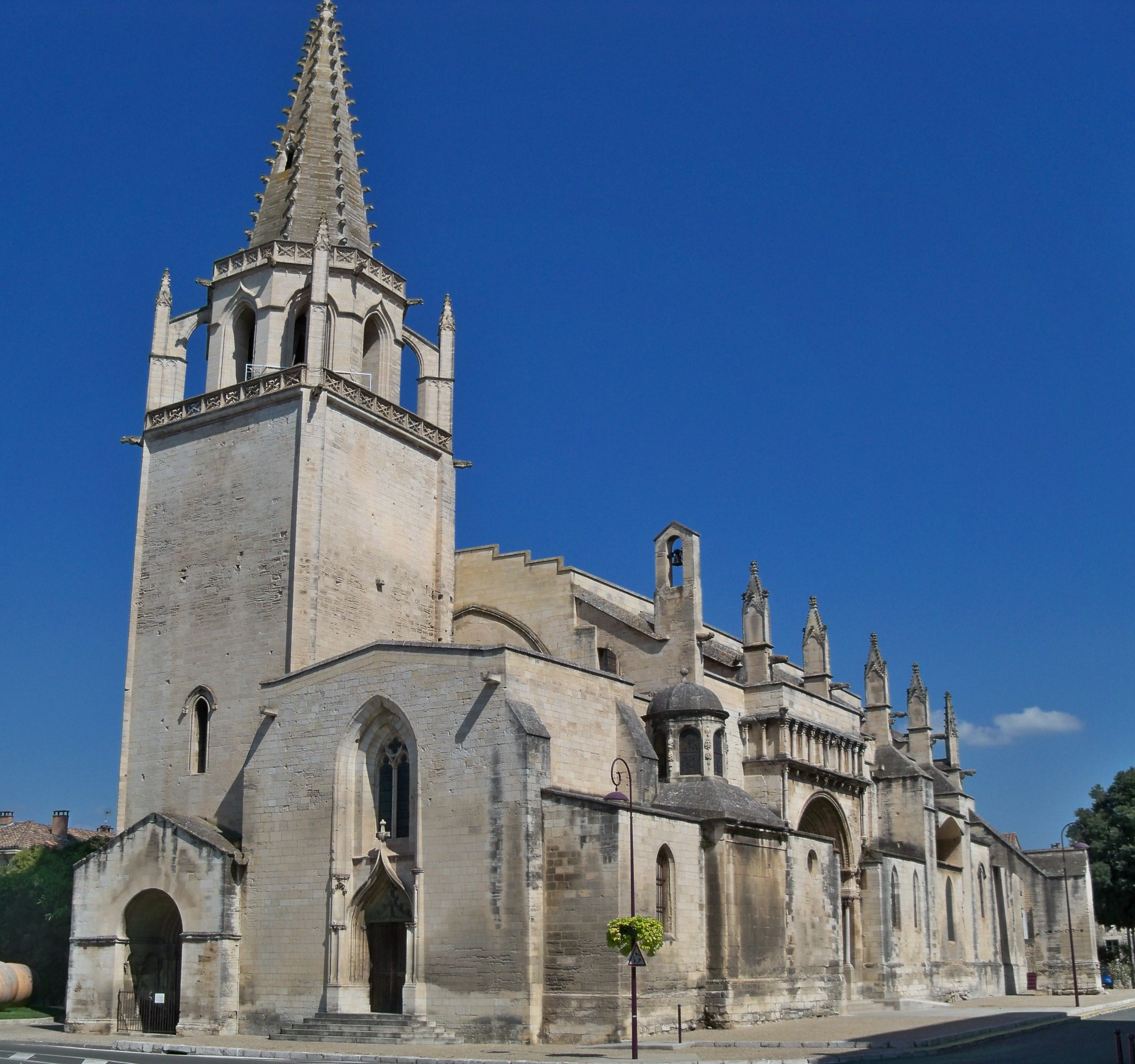
- Collégiale Sainte Marthe de Tarascon
- Location: Tarascon
- Country: France
- Denomination: Catholic Church

History
- Founded: 12th century
- Dedicated: 1197. dedicated to Saint Martha
- Consecrated: 12th century

Architecture
- Functional status: Former Abbey church, parish church
- Heritage designation: French Historic Monument
- Designated: 1840
- Architectural type: Romanesque, Gothic
- Completed: 1197

Administration
- Archdiocese: Archdiocese of Aix

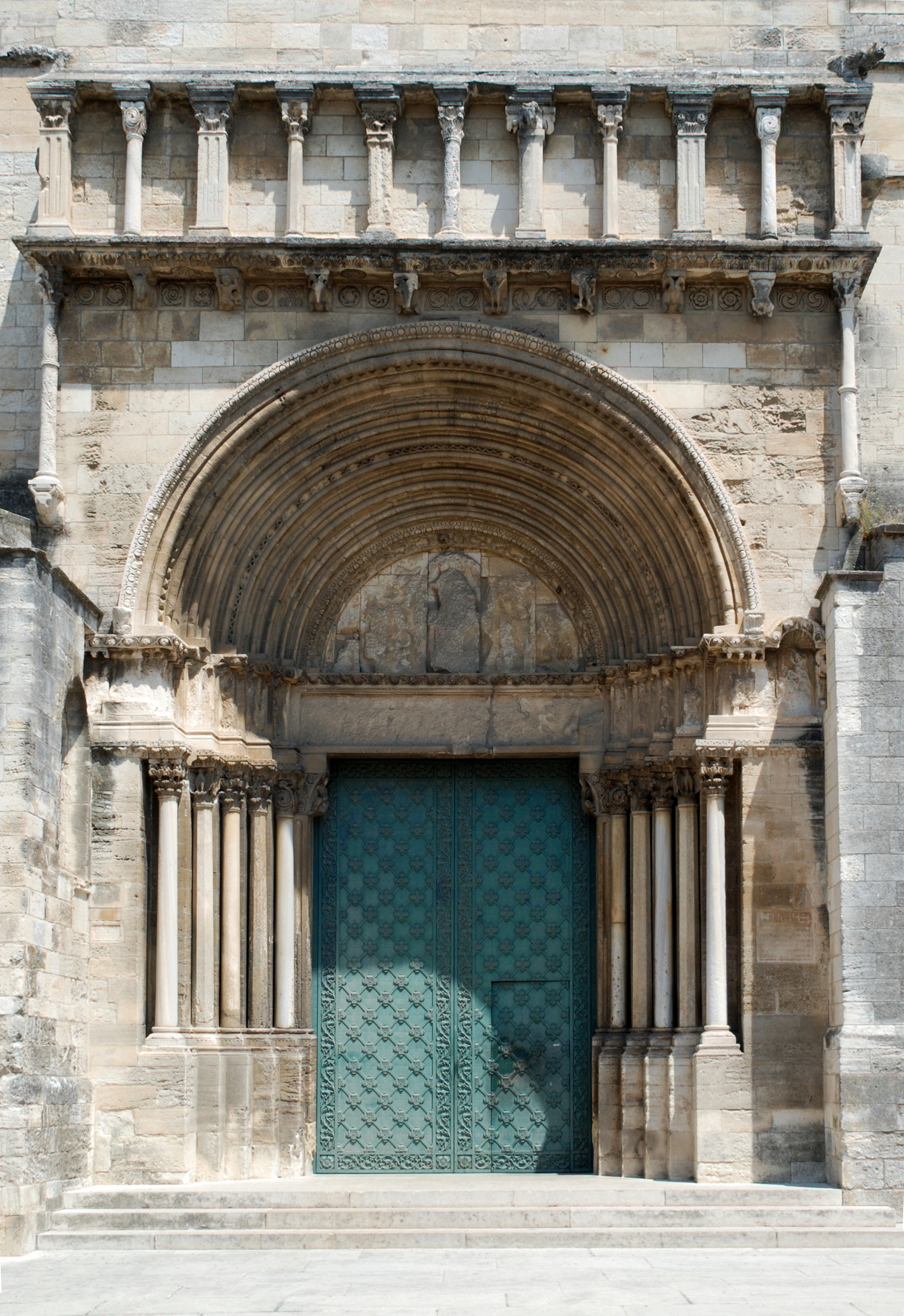
Romanesque southern portal

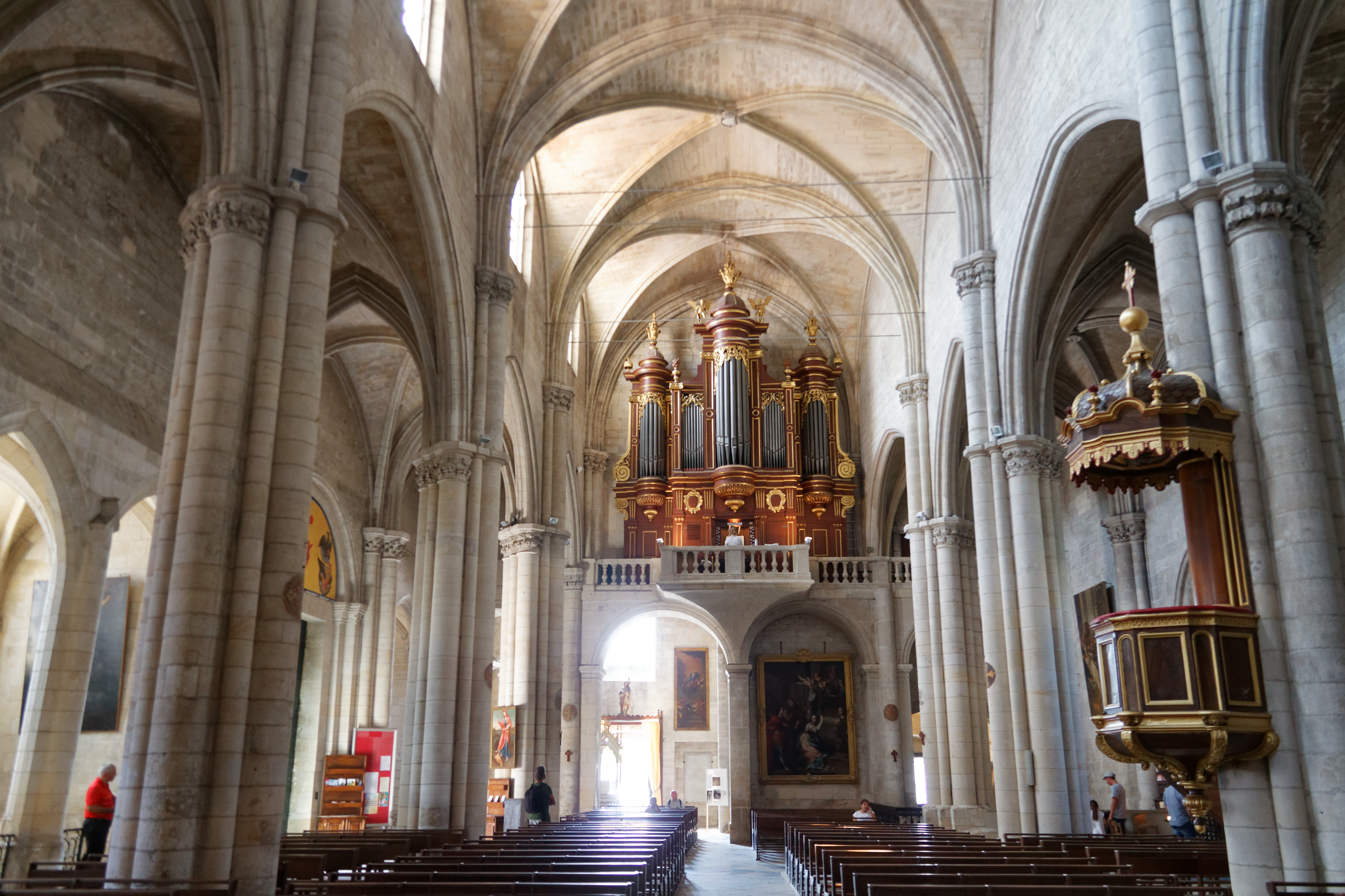
Church interior

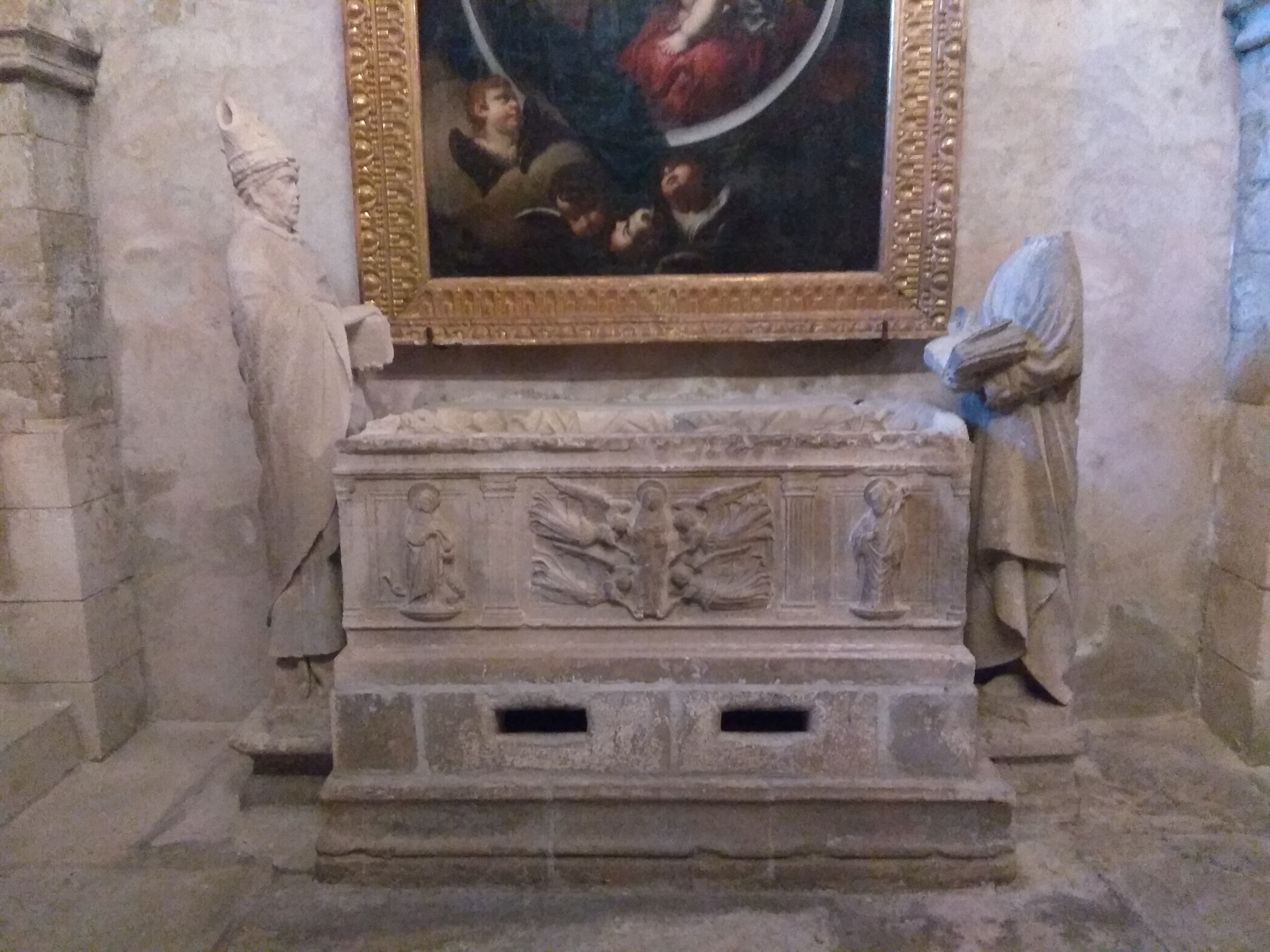
Sarcophagus of Saint Martha

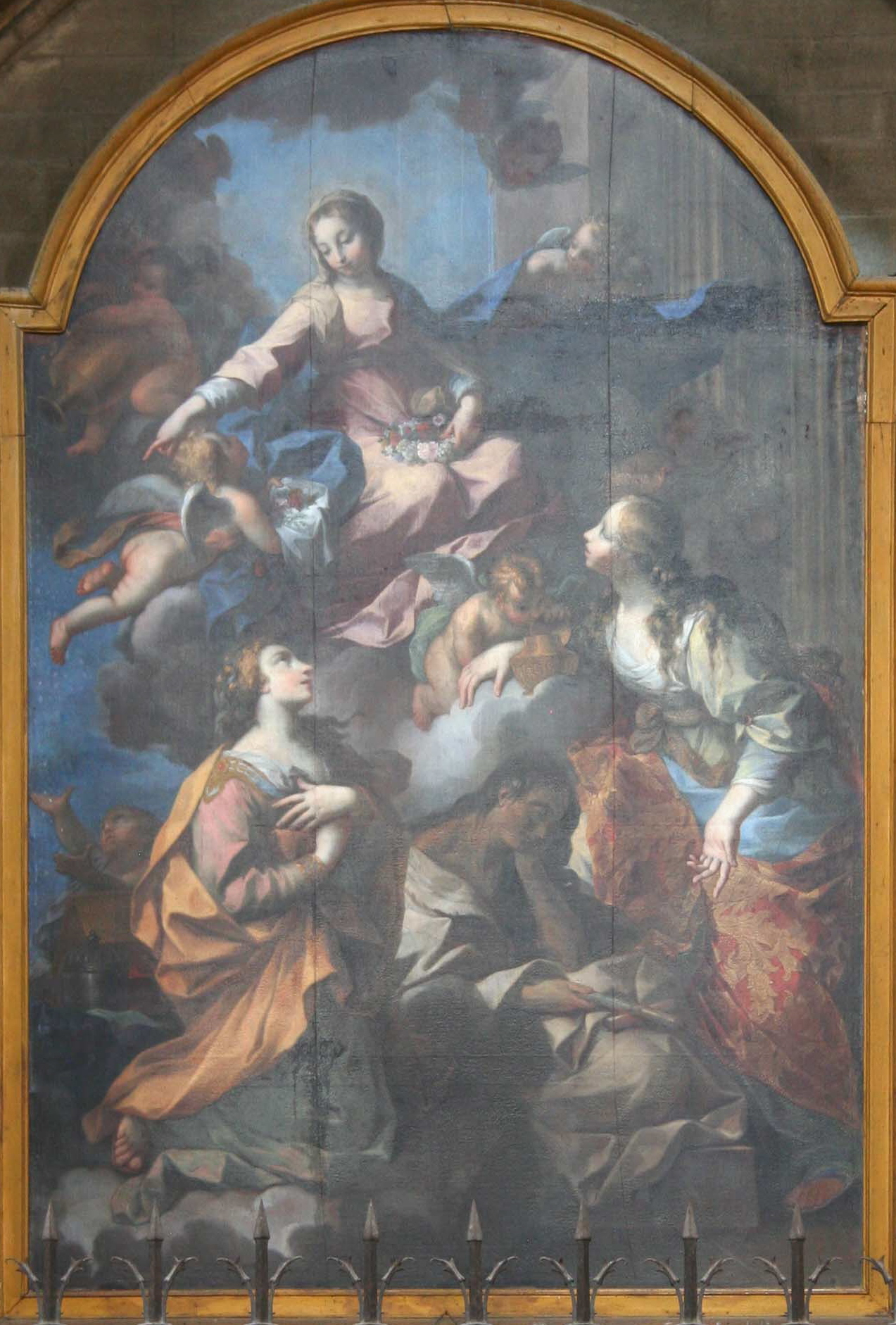
Mary of Egypt by Pierre Parrocel

Église Sainte-Marthe de Tarascon (Occitan: Eglésia Santa Marta de Tarascon) or Collégiale Royale Sainte-Marthe is a collegiate church in Tarascon, France, dedicated to Saint Martha. According to a local tradition, the biblical figure Martha is buried there.

== History ==
Collegiate Sainte-Marthe was dedicated in 1197 and enlarged in the 14th and 15th centuries. It was built half-Romanesque in the 12th century and half-Gothic in the 14th century.

The tympanum and lintel of the Romanesque southern portal were severely damaged during the French Revolution.

The church spire was destroyed during Allied bombings on August 16, 1944. It was later rebuilt.

== Features ==
The crypt dates from the 3rd century. It houses the relics of Martha in a sarcophagus of the 4th century.

Church paintings include:

Painting by Charles-André van Loo:

- Mort de Saint François or Saint François d'Assise recevant les stigmates (1730)
- Sainte Marthe domptant la Tarasque (1730). Originally in the convent of the Capuchins and later in Eglise Saint-Jacques.

Paintings by Joseph-Marie Vien. Based on the narrative of the Golden Legend, they were initially part of a series painted for the convent of the Capuchins in Tarascon.

- Sainte Marthe recevant le Christ à Bethanie (1747)
- La résurrection de Lazare (1747)
- L'embarquement de sainte Marthe (1751)
- L'arrivée de sainte Marthe en Provence (1748)
- La prédication de sainte Marthe (1748)
- L'agonie de sainte Marthe (1748)
- Les funérailles de sainte Marthe (1748)

Paintings by Nicolas Mignard:

- L'Assomption (1643)
- Arrivée du Christ à Béthanie (1640)

Paintings by Pierre Parrocel:

- Sainte Cunégonde et sainte Cécile
- Sainte Marie l'égyptienne
- Le Christ sur la croix
- Sainte Catherine de Sienne
- Saint Thomas d'Aquin
- Adoration des Mages
- Adoration des Bergers
- L'Annonciation
- Notre Dame du peuple

Painting by Philippe Sauvan:

- Saint Dominique (1789)
