= Yoan Benyahya =

Footballer from France (born 1987)

Personal information
- Date of birth: 26 May 1987 (age 39)
- Place of birth: Tarascon, France
- Height: 1.87 m (6 ft 2 in)
- Position: Defender

Team information
- Current team: Granville
- Number: 5

Senior career*
Years	Team	Apps	(Gls)
2006–2009	Nîmes	1	(0)
2009–2010	Istres	1	(0)
2011–2012	Gazélec Ajaccio	18	(1)
2012–2014	Uzès Pont du Gard	25	(0)
2016–	Granville	91	(1)
- * Club domestic league appearances and goals as of 20:53, 9 April 2022 (UTC)

Yoan Benyahya (born 26 May 1987) is a French professional footballer who plays as a defender for Championnat National 1 club Granville.

== Career ==
Benyahya began his career with Nîmes in 2006 but made only one senior appearance in three years for the club, coming on as a late substitute for Pierre Germann in the 1–0 win over Villemomble on 8 December 2007. In the summer of 2009, he joined Istres and made his Ligue 2 debut in the 0–4 defeat away at Tours on 23 January 2010, replacing Brahim El Bahri after 75 minutes.

After being released by Istres in 2010, Benyahya spent a year without a club before signing with Championnat National outfit Gazélec Ajaccio ahead of the 2011–12 season. On 8 October 2011, he scored his first goal in senior football, netting the winner in the 2–1 victory against Vannes at the Stade Ange Casanova. He played a total of 17 matches during the campaign as Gazélec won promotion to Ligue 2 for the first time in their history.

On 2 October 2012, Benyahya signed for Championnat National side Uzès Pont du Gard, and was a regular pick for the remainder of the 2012–13 season, making 17 appearances. He was released in January 2014.

On 1 February 2016, Benyahya signed for Granville.
