= Tartarin =

Fictional character created by Alphonse Daudet

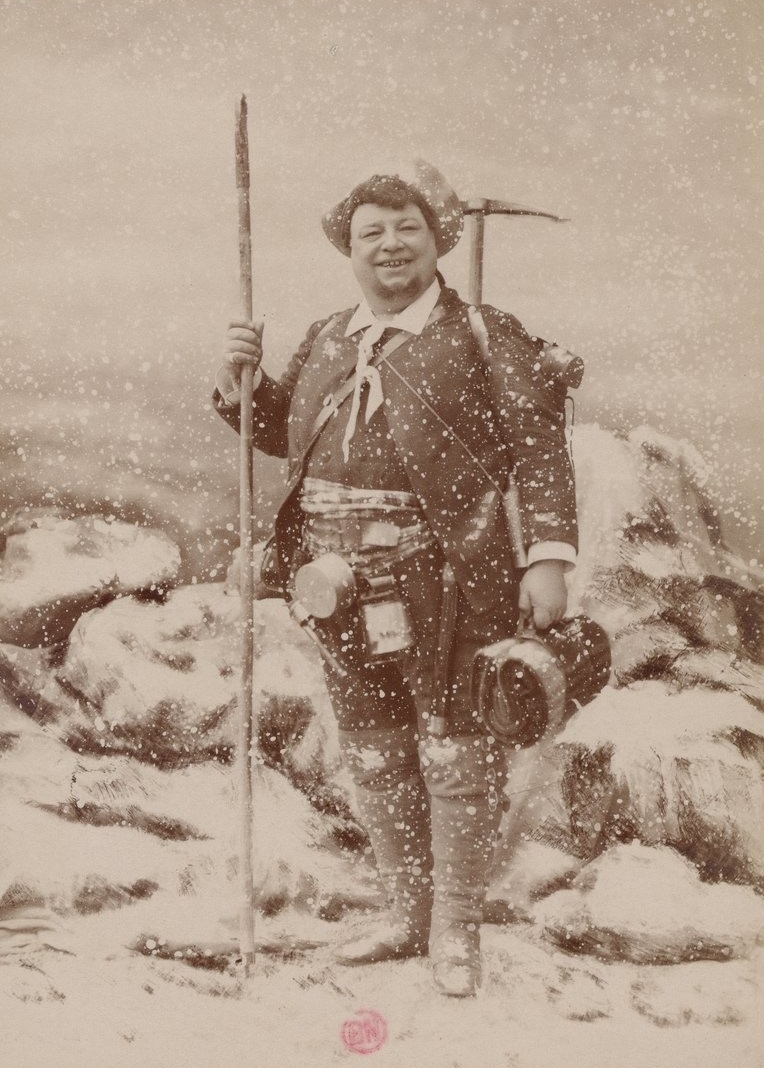
Joseph-François Dailly as Tartarin in an 1888 stage adaptation of Tartarin on the Alps

Tartarin is the main character in the French writer Alphonse Daudet's novels Tartarin of Tarascon (1872), Tartarin on the Alps (1885) and Port Tarascon (1890). He is a plump and gullible man who is spurred by the small-town dynamics of Tarascon in Provence to go on a series of misadventures abroad. The stories are written as parodies of heroic genres.

== History and description ==
The Tartarin character originated with Alphonse Daudet's desire to use his experiences from colonial Algeria, which he visited in 1861–1862, in a work of fiction. A precursor to the Tartarin stories was Daudet's comedic short story "Chapatin le tueur de lions" (lit. 'Chapatin the Killer of Lions'). Daudet abandoned his original plan to write a realist novel about Algeria and instead focused on the humorous delusions of an adventurer in Africa. In the first Tartarin novel, Tartarin of Tarascon from 1872, the plump, middle-aged and gullible protagonist goes to Africa to hunt lions, spurred by the dynamics of his Provençal home town of Tarascon. The book became a commercial success, eventually prompting Daudet to write two sequels. The first sequel, Tartarin on the Alps from 1885, mocks the heroic tropes of mountaineering literature. The second, Port Tarascon from 1890, is a parody of the colonial novel. The mock-heroic character has been compared to Don Quixote.

== Legacy ==
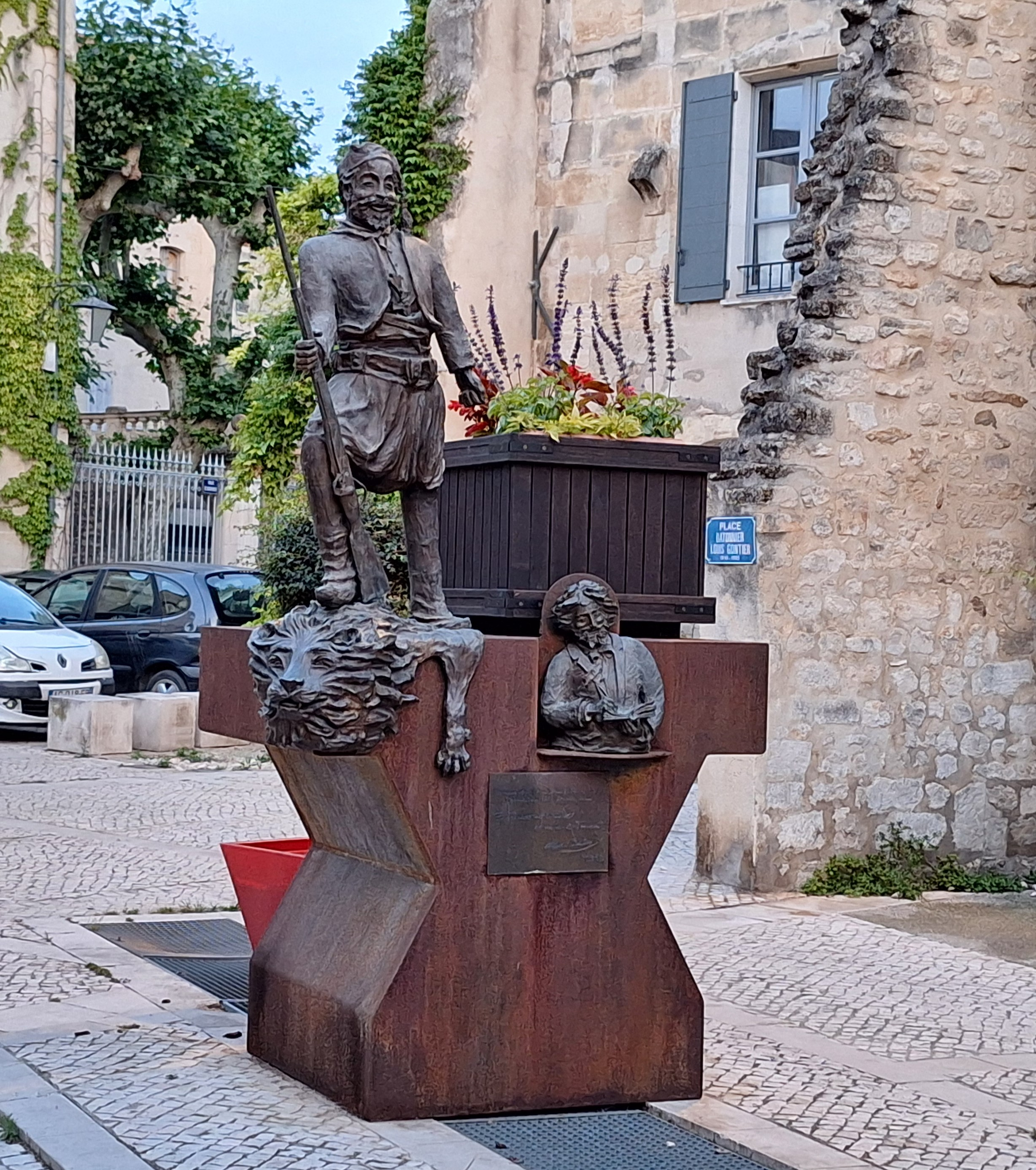
Sculpture of Tartarin in Tarascon

Georges Méliès made the first film about Tartarin, the lost Tartarin de Tarascon from 1908. The character was portrayed by Raimu in the 1934 film Tartarin of Tarascon and by Francis Blanche in the 1962 film Tartarin of Tarascon.

There are two German operas about the character, one composed by Friedrich Radermacher that premiered in Cologne in 1965 and one composed by Manfred Niehaus that premiered in Hamburg in 1977. Glénat published a comic-book adaptation of Tartarin of Tarascon by Pierre Guilmard and Louisa Djouadi in 2010.

There is a bronze sculpture of Tartarin in Tarascon. A museum devoted to the character existed in Tarascon from 1985 to 2008, after which the building became a private residence.
