= Léon Ménard =

French lawyer and historian

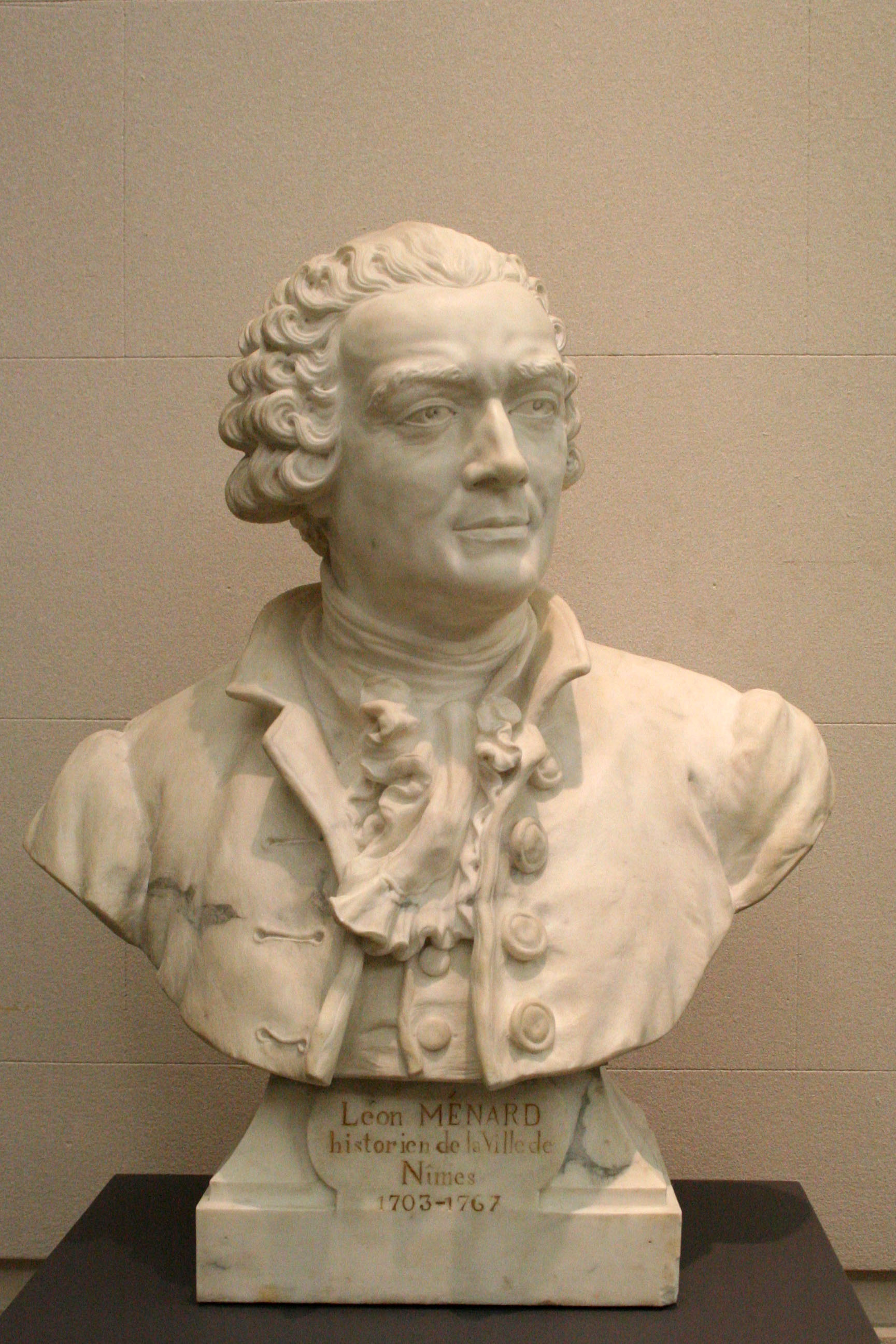
Lucien-Pascal-Léon-Ménard

Léon Ménard (12 September 1706 – 1 October 1767) was a French lawyer and historian.

== Biography ==
Ménard was born at Tarascon, Provence. When he had completed his study of the humanities under the Jesuits at Lyon, he studied jurisprudence at Toulouse and became counsellor at the Superior Court of Nîmes.

From 1744 he was constantly in Paris, busy with historical research. He was a member of the Académie des Inscriptions et Belles-Lettres, and several other learned bodies.

He died in Paris.

== Works ==
His first work concerned the history of his native city and its bishops, and was entitled "Histoire des évêques de Nîmes" (2 vols., The Hague, 1737). Later he enlarged this work, and between 1760 and 1758 he published at Paris the "Histoire civile, ecclésiastique et littéraire de la ville de Nîmes" in seven volumes with illustrations. An abridgement appeared at Paris in 1790, and one at Nîmes in 3 vols., 1831-33.

He also wrote:

- "Les Amours de Callisthène et de Chariclée", The Hague, 1740, Paris, 1753 (also Paris, 1765, under the title of "Callisthène ou le modèle de l'amour et de l'amitié");
- "Mœurs et usages des Grecs" (Lyons, 1743), a widely read work which became the model of similar productions.

In addition he wrote a number of articles for periodicals, especially on topics from the history of France in Roman times. In 1762 the Magistracy of Avignon sent for him and confided to him the task of writing a history of that city. But after two years of work he was constrained by ill-health to leave it unfinished.
