= Tarascon =

Commune in Provence-Alpes-Côte d'Azur, France

- Commune
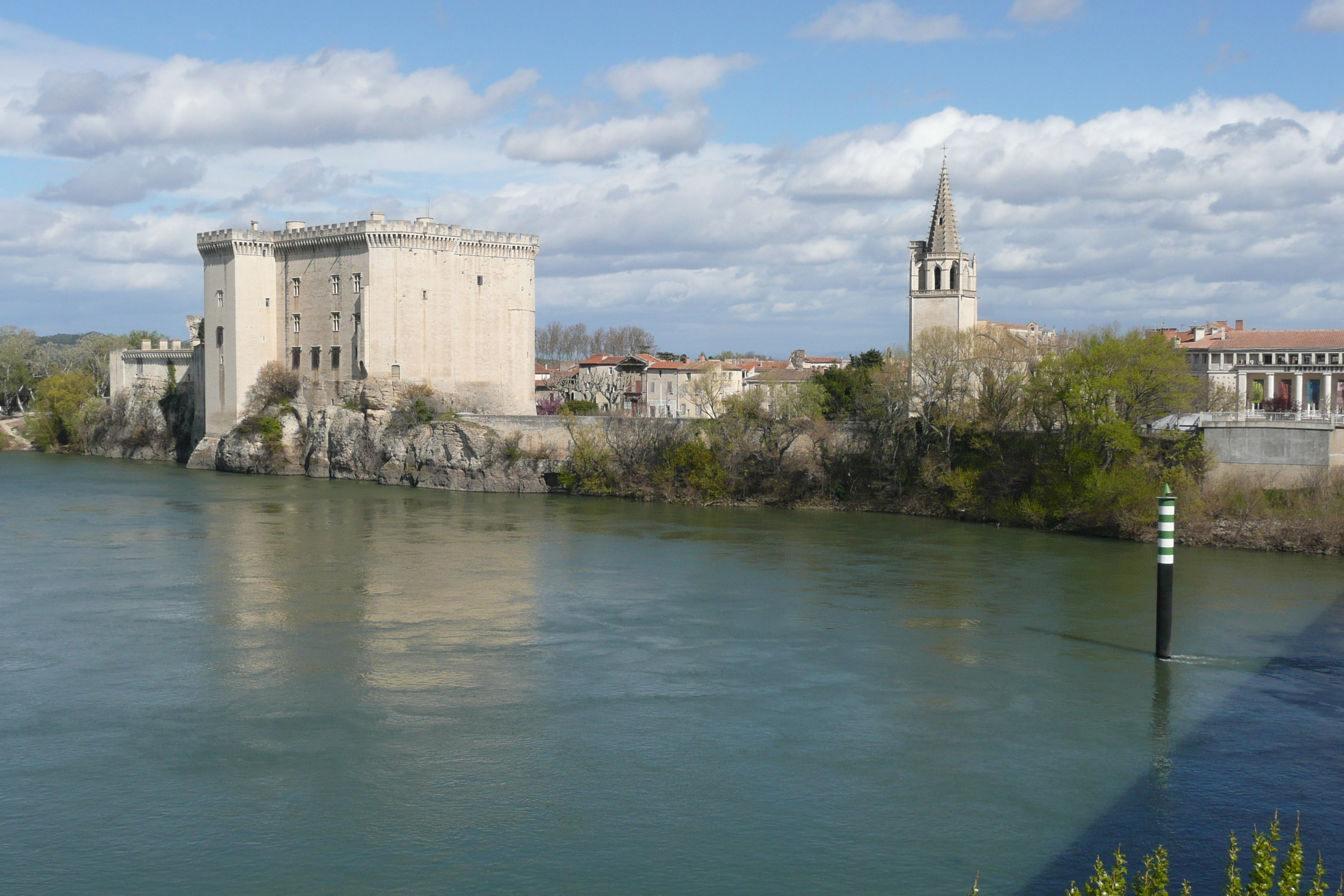
- Tarascon Castle along the Rhône River

- Coat of arms
- Location of Tarascon
- Location within France Location within Provence-Alpes-Côte d'Azur
- Coordinates: 43°48′21″N 4°39′37″E
- Country: France
- Region: Provence-Alpes-Côte d'Azur
- Department: Bouches-du-Rhône
- Arrondissement: Arles
- Canton: Châteaurenard
- Intercommunality: CA Arles-Crau-Camargue-Montagnette

Government
  - Mayor (2026–32): Alexandre Ducouret
- Area^{1}: 73.97 km^{2} (28.56 sq mi)
- Elevation: 17 m (56 ft)
- Highest elevation: 200 m (660 ft)
- Lowest elevation: 3 m (9.8 ft)
- Population (2023): 15,396
  - Density: 208.1/km^{2} (539.1/sq mi)
- Time zone: UTC+01:00 (CET)
  - Summer (DST): UTC+02:00 (CEST)
- INSEE/Postal code: 13108 /13150
- ^{1} French Land Register data, which excludes lakes, ponds, glaciers > 1 km^{2} (0.386 sq mi or 247 acres) and river estuaries.

Tarascon (French pronunciation: [taʁaskɔ̃]; Occitan: Tarascon), sometimes referred to as Tarascon-sur-Rhône, is a commune situated at the extreme west of the Bouches-du-Rhône department of France in the Provence-Alpes-Côte d'Azur region. Inhabitants are referred to as Tarasconnais or Tarasconnaises. The patron saint of the city is Martha of Bethany, whose motto is "Concordia Felix".

== Geography ==
Tarascon is located 23 km (14 mi) south of Avignon and 20 km (12 mi) north of Arles, on the left (east) bank of the river Rhône. On the other side is the similarly sized town of Beaucaire in the département of Gard, région of Occitania. Directly opposite each other and connected by several bridges, Beaucaire and Tarascon effectively constitute one town, with about 30,000 inhabitants. An irrigation canal of 18,00 km length rejoins the Rhone near Tarascon.

== History ==
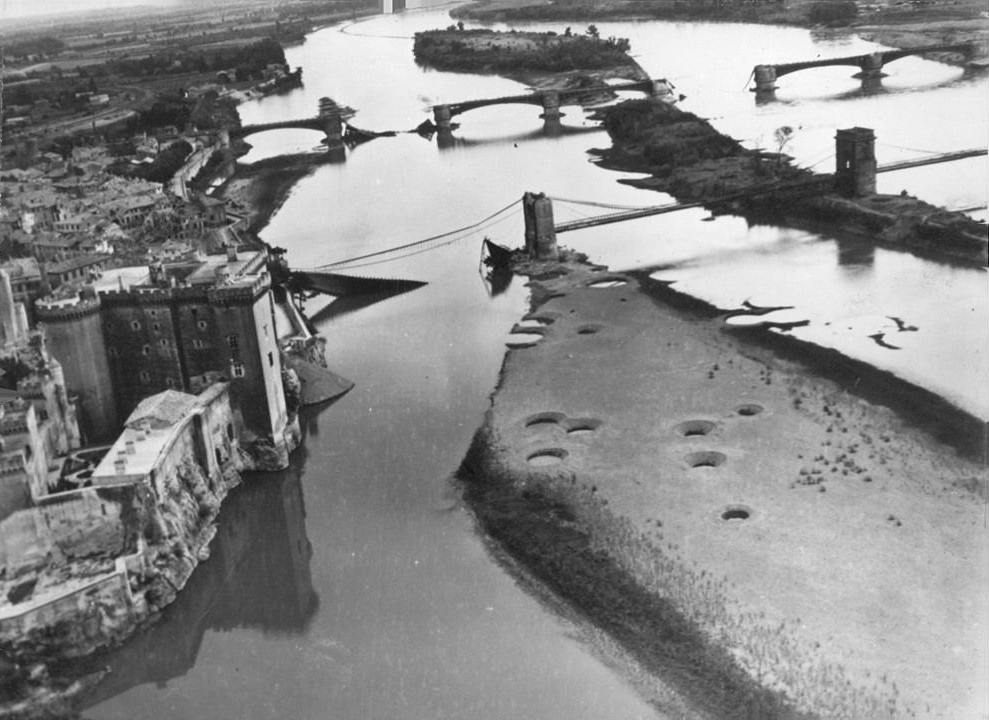
Bridges across the Rhone after the Allied bombings of 1944

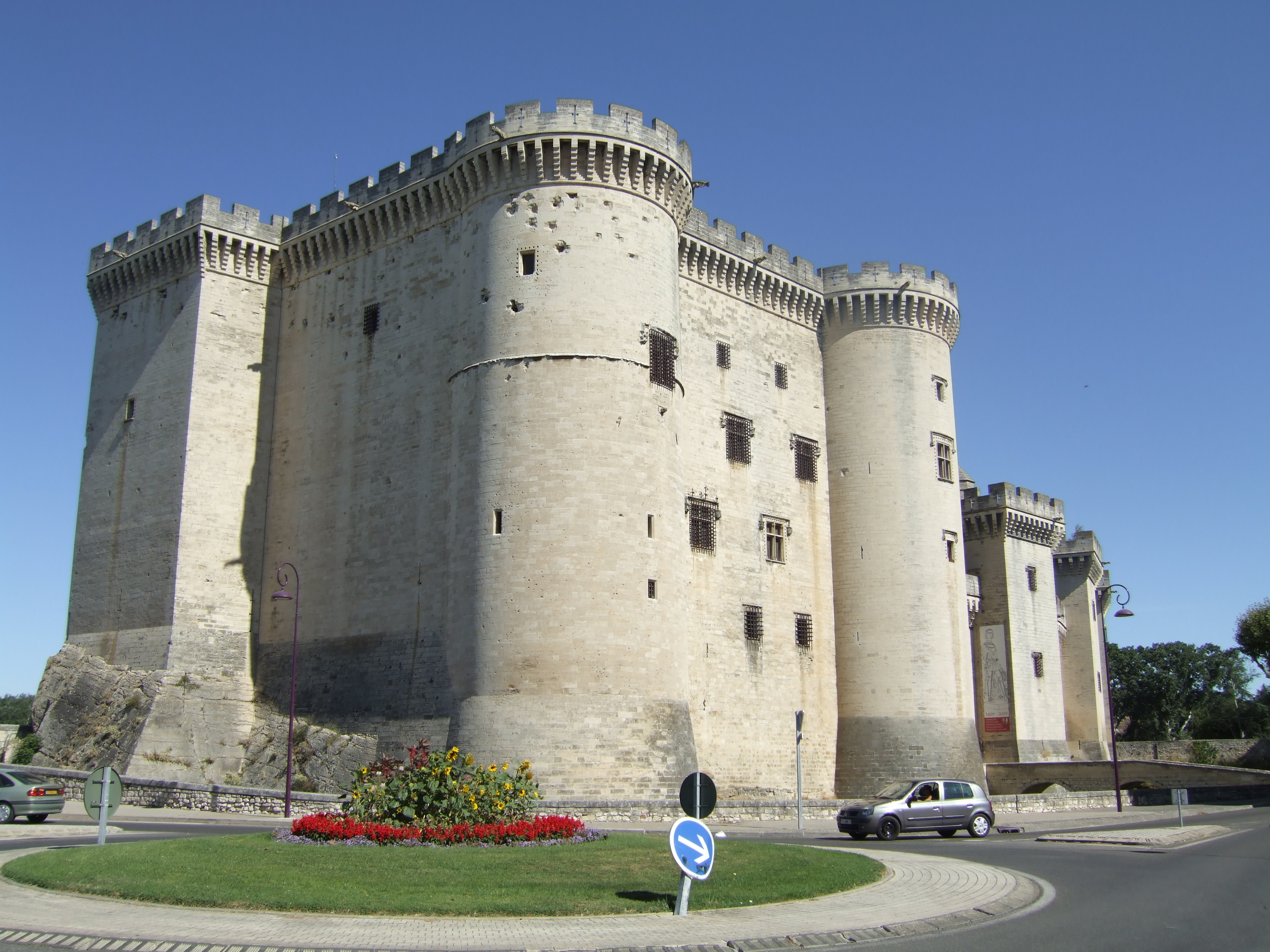
Medieval castle

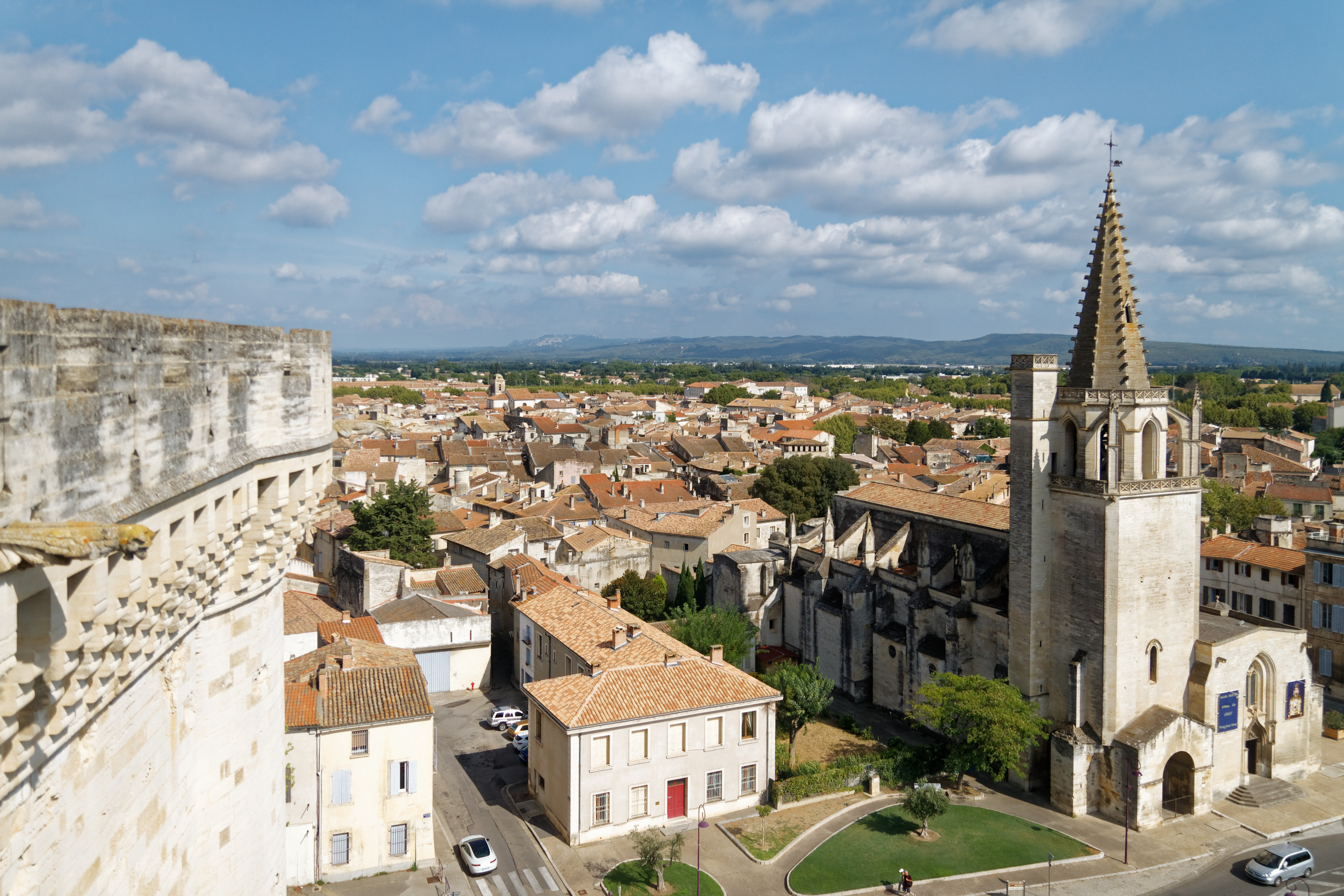
Tarascon and St. Martha's Church from top of Castle.

Shards dating from the Late Bronze Age have been found in a shelter at a place called the Lèque, confirming the existence of human settlement in the Alpilles since prehistoric times. Settlement spread in the early Iron Age. At Tarascon, the sites sit alongside the Rhone, near the church of Sainte-Marthe.

In the second part of the first Iron Age (7th–6th centuries BC), the population shifted from a nomadic lifestyle to a sedentary one and began to construct extensive buildings. Trade intensified with the Eastern Mediterranean, with the people of the area likely trading grain for luxury goods.

Located along the Rhone, at the crossroads between Avignon, the Camargue and the Luberon, Tarascon is still associated with fairy tales and legends dating back to prehistory. According to tradition, Martha of Bethany, who came from Judea, landed at Tarascon c. AD 48 where an amphibious dragon or tarasque was destroying the river traffic. She tamed the beast only for it to be butchered by the townspeople. Many pilgrims visit the Royal College of Sainte-Marthe, built in her honor near the castle of King René. This sanctuary, the main monument of the city, contains the relics and the tomb of St. Martha in the crypt which was built on the exact location of her house.

Rostagnetus of Tharascone, knight, was provost of Nice, Alderman of Tarascon (1322, 1325) and son of former co-lords of the city in the 12th century. In 1366–67, Guillam de Sault ruled Tarascon. He received an annual salary of 90 florins. The death of Queen Joanna I reopened a succession crisis at the head of the County of Provence, the cities of the Aix Union (1382–1387) supporting Charles de Duras against Louis I of Anjou. Tarascon hesitated before joining the Union of Aix, the community deciding in 1383, without committing itself very firmly. When Louis I died, Tarascon was also one of the first cities to receive Jacques Reillanne, Ambassador of his widow Marie de Blois, regent of Louis II of Anjou, in the summer of 1385. He successfully persuaded them to switch sides and join the Angevin Kings of Anjou. The castle is well preserved. The work of construction began in 1400 under Louis II of Anjou and completed in 1449 by his son, King René, led by Guillaume Crespin, captain of the castle, and his lieutenant, Regnault Serocourt, its close relative. With an impressive defensive system, the building also houses a princely residence.

The town was damaged by Allied bombings from June to August 1944, during World War II. The bombings, targeting the bridges across the Rhone in an attempt to hamper the German retreat, destroyed parts of the old town. The first bombing took place on 25 June 1944. On 16 August 1944 the tip of the church tower of Église Sainte-Marthe was destroyed.

== Landmarks ==
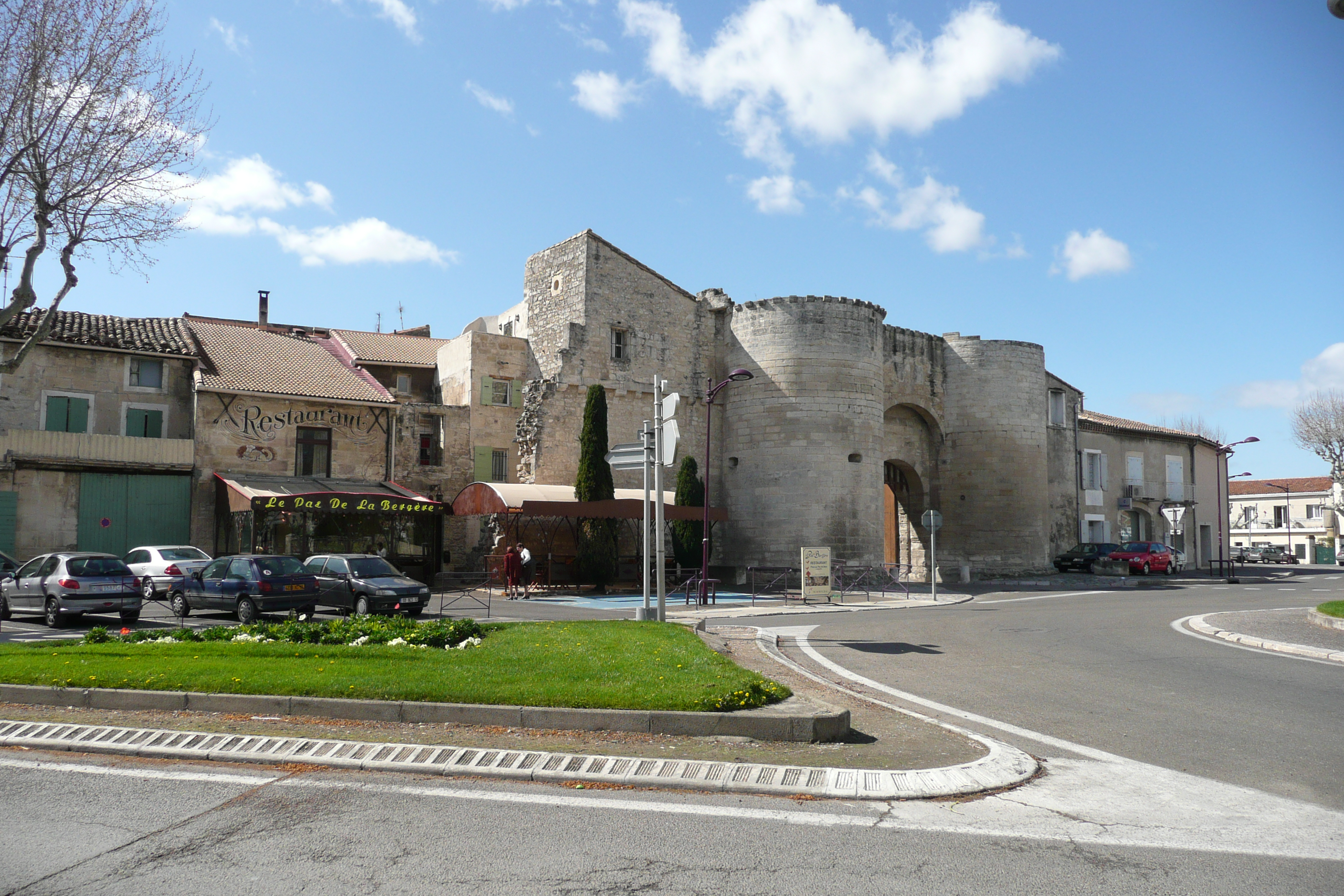
Porte de la Condamine

=== Collegiate Church ===
Église collégiale Ste Marthe (St Martha's Collegiate Church) is where, according to a local tradition, the biblical figure Martha is buried. The church was built half-Romanesque in the 12th century and half-Gothic in the 14th century. The crypt dates from the 3rd century.

Collegiate Sainte-Marthe was dedicated in 1197 and enlarged in the 14th and 15th centuries. The crypt houses the relics of Martha in a sarcophagus of the fourth century.

=== Medieval castle ===
The castle of King René. The present castle replaced a fortress, built on the site of the Roman town to monitor the border of Provence. After the destruction perpetrated in 1399 by the bands of Raymond de Turenne, the Anjou family decided to rebuild it entirely. The construction of the current castle of Tarascon was started in 1401 by Louis II of Anjou. The construction was continued by his first son, Louis III of Anjou, and was completed in 1449 by his second son, René I of Naples (René d'Anjou). Thus, the castle is often referred to as le château du roi René (King René's castle). It was turned into a military prison in the 17th century, until its acquisition by the state in 1932.

It consists of two independent parts: the South, the stately home, flanked by round towers on the city side and river side with walls of up to 48 m high and square towers and the North, the lower court that defends the rectangular constructions. It stands right on the banks of the Rhône opposite Château de Beaucaire, and near St Martha's Collegiate Church.

=== Other historic buildings ===
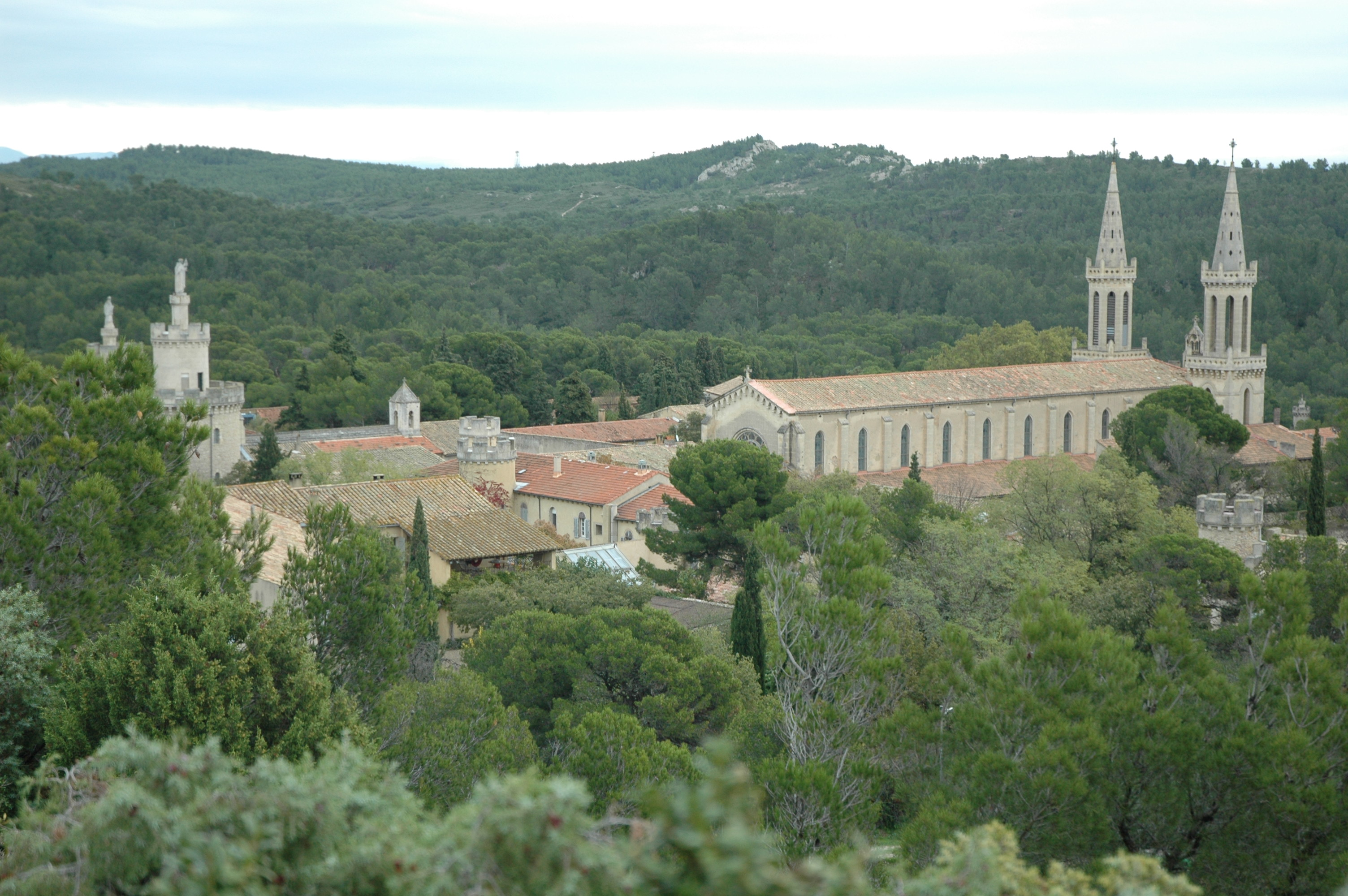
Frigolet Abbey

Civilian and military architecture

- Historic town centre, including Rue des Halles and its arcades
- Hôtel de Ville (town hall), built in 1648 in Baroque style. The statue of St. Martha slaying the Tarasque was conducted by the sculptor Louis Le Male.
- Three city gates remain from the former city wall, demolished in 1820: Portail St. Jean, Porte de la Condamine and Porte Jarnègues.
- Casernes Kilmaine. Former barracks. Since 2012, it house the Tribunal de grande instance court.

Religious architecture

- Cloître des Cordeliers. 16th-century cloister
- Église Saint-Jacques de Tarascon. Built between 1740 and 1745 in Baroque style by Antoine Damour from Tarascon, following the plans of architect Jean-Baptiste Franque from Avignon
- Frigolet Abbey
- Chapelle Saint Gabriel (fr). 12th-century Romanesque chapel southeast of the town.
- Abbaye Saint-Honorat - Former Benedictine nunnery

=== Hamlets ===
Hamlets located on the territory of the commune include:

- Lansac
- Saint-Gabriel (ancient Ernaginum)

== Coat of arms ==
Tarascon's coat of arms depicts in its upper half the city's castle, and in the lower half the fearsome tarasque, legendary tamed by Martha of Bethany, but here in the process of devouring a man.

== Culture ==
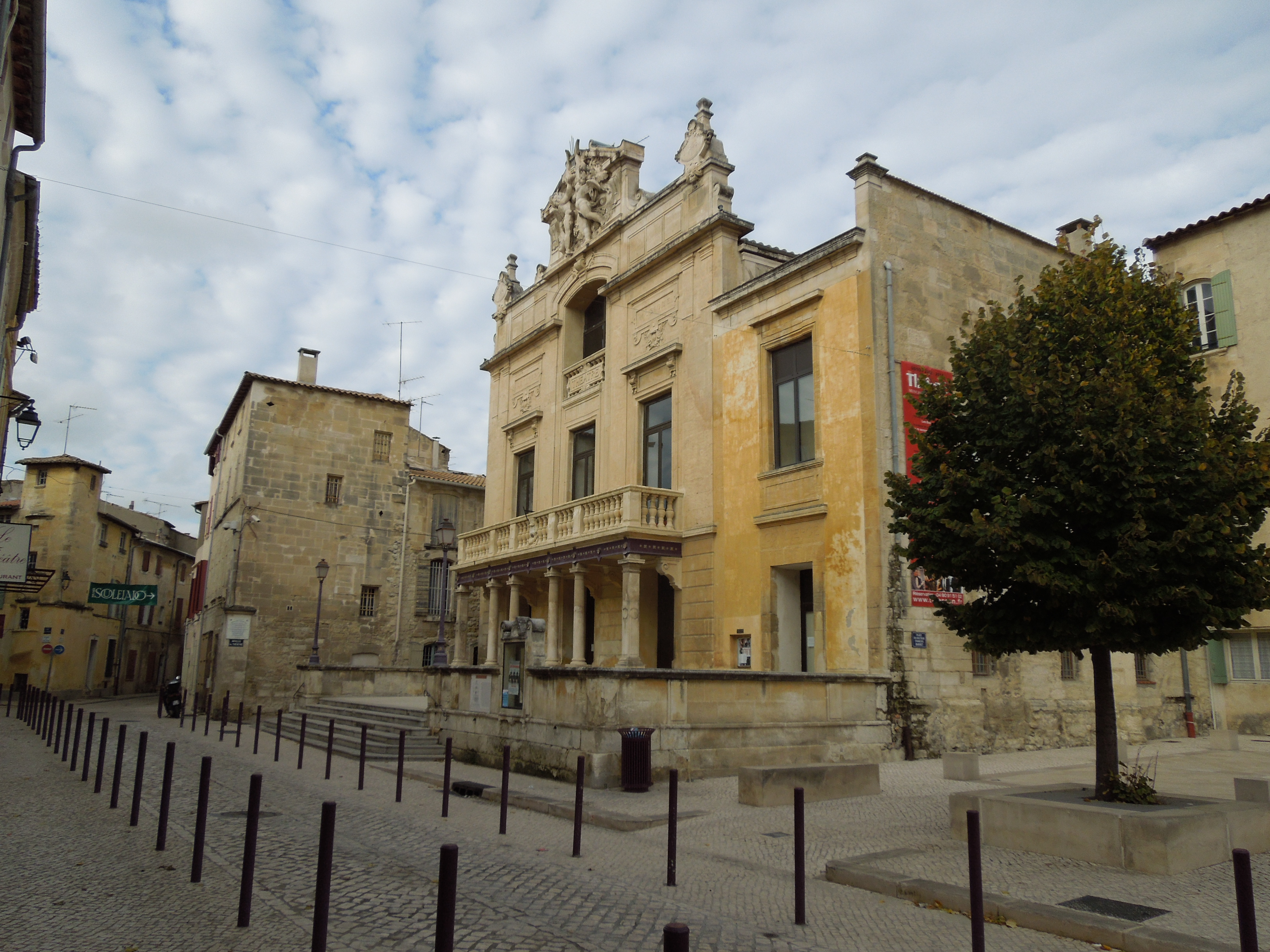
Theater

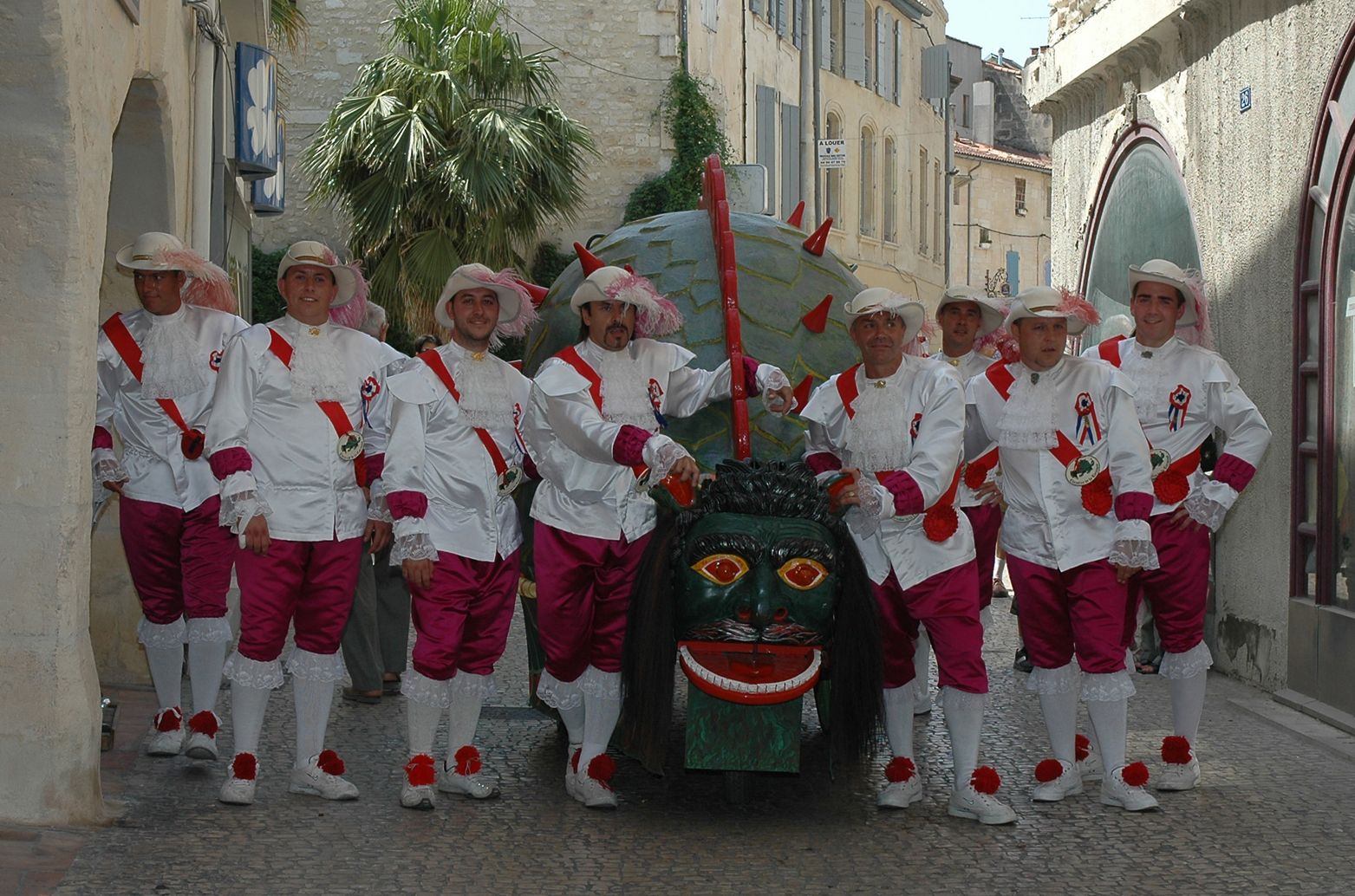
Tarasque parade in Tarascon.

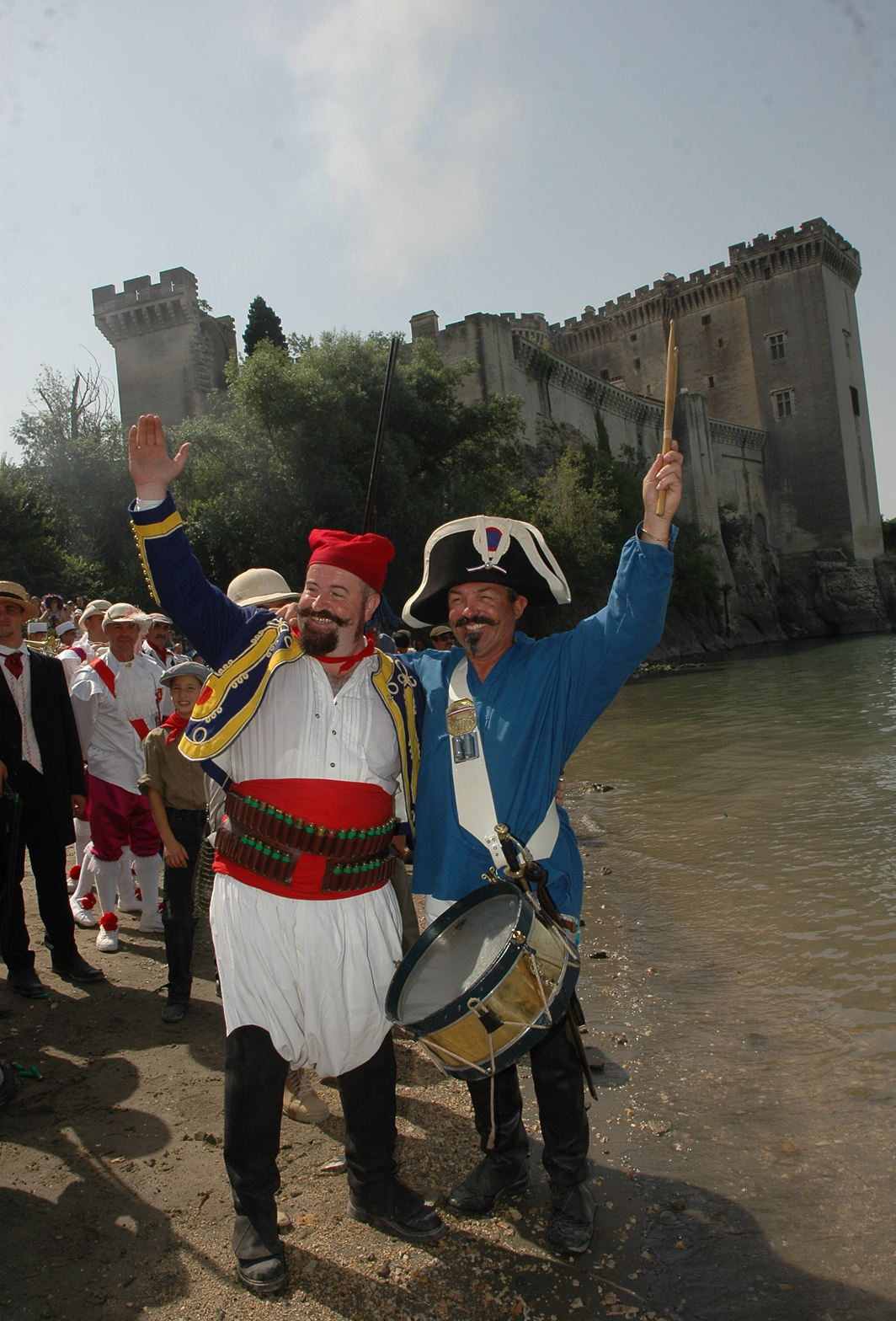
Festival celebrating Tartarin

Municipal theater.

A mythological monster, the Tarasque, is said to have lived there at the beginning of the 1st century. It was purportedly tamed by Martha in 48 AD.

The novel Tartarin de Tarascon (1872) and its two sequels Tartarin sur les Alpes (1885) and Port-Tarascon (1890), by Alphonse Daudet, were set here. From 1985 to 2008, there was a small museum in the town, dedicated to the fictional character Tartarin.

A festival is held every year on the last Sunday of June to remember Tartarin and the Tarasque.

Private museum Souleiado. Opened in 1988 in the 17th century hôtel d'Ayminy.

== Administration ==
Mandate	Name	Party
1935–1940	Numa Corbessas	–
1940–1941	Eugène Barthélémy	–
1941–1944	Etienne Philip	–
1944	Commission spéciale	–
1944–1947	Numa Corbessas	–
1947–1965	Honoré Valette	–
1965–1971	(Colonel) Jean André	–
1971–1983	Antonin Saint Michel	PS
1983–2002	Thérèse Aillaud	RPR
2002–2005	Jean Reynaud	UMP
2005–2014	Charles Fabre	UMP
2014–current	Lucien Limousin	DVD

== Economy ==
In 2008, the median household income tax was €13,986, placing in Tarascon 29,178th among the 31,604 communes with more than 50 households in France.

Olive oil from the Valley of Baux-de-Provence is a protected designation of origin (AOC) from an order made by the INAO, the 27 August 1997. The varieties of olives that fall within this order are the Béruguette, Grossane and verdale Bouches-du-Rhône. It also produces crushed olives and black olives included in the order of the INAO. The varieties of olives crushed are salonenque and Béruguette. For black olives the only variety accepted is Grossane.

Apart from agriculture, the industry most easily identifiable around the Alpilles is tourism. Even the wine and olive oil producers take into account the development of tourism and increasingly offer tasting services. There are three main types of tourism in the Alpilles. First, the historical and cultural tourism that relies on a rich historical heritage (Les Baux-de-Provence, Glanum, etc..) or festivals. Second, the relaxation tourism resulting in a significant expansion of B&Bs, hotels and rented properties. Finally, the green tourism that benefits from the many hiking trails and protected framework offered by the massif and its surroundings.

== Population ==
Historical population

Year	Pop.	±% p.a.
1793	9,069	—
1800	11,320	+3.22%
1806	10,554	−1.16%
1821	10,830	+0.17%
1831	10,967	+0.13%
1836	10,774	−0.35%
1841	11,362	+1.07%
1846	11,968	+1.04%
1851	12,539	+0.94%
1856	13,229	+1.08%
1861	13,489	+0.39%
1866	12,454	−1.58%
1872	11,249	−1.68%
1876	10,409	−1.92%
1881	9,833	−1.13%
1886	9,314	−1.08%
1891	9,263	−0.11%
1896	9,023	−0.52%
1901	8,885	−0.31%

Year	Pop.	±% p.a.
1906	8,972	+0.20%
1911	8,631	−0.77%
1921	8,299	−0.39%
1926	8,478	+0.43%
1931	8,496	+0.04%
1936	7,875	−1.51%
1946	7,781	−0.12%
1954	7,744	−0.06%
1962	8,637	+1.37%
1968	10,584	+3.45%
1975	10,365	−0.30%
1982	10,735	+0.50%
1990	10,826	+0.11%
1999	12,640	+1.74%
2007	13,177	+0.52%
2012	13,540	+0.54%
2017	14,813	+1.81%
2023	15,396	+0.65%

Source: EHESS and INSEE (1968–2023)

== Climate ==
The climate in the Alpilles is considered Mediterranean. The winters are mild and dry and the summers hot and dry. The maximum temperature is observed in July and August (29 °C (84.2 °F)), the minimum temperature in December and January (3 °C (37.4 °F)). The rainiest month is January with seven days of rain on average, against two days in July, the driest month. The Alpilles region receives more rainfall than the coast of the Mediterranean: 500 mm / year in the Camargue against 600–700 mm / year for the Alpilles. The mistral blows violently from the north or northwest, especially in winter and spring . The mistral blows strongly 100 days a year on average and more weakly for 83 days, which leaves only 182 windless days per year. Two types are distinguished; the "white mistral", which clears the sky, and the rarer "black mistral", which is accompanied with rain.

On average, Tarascon experiences 18.2 days per year with a minimum temperature below 0 °C (32.0 °F), no days per year with a minimum temperature below −10 °C (14.0 °F), 0.2 days per year with a maximum temperature below 0 °C (32.0 °F), and 56.2 days per year with a maximum temperature above 30 °C (86.0 °F). The record high temperature was 43.0 °C (109.4 °F) on 28 June 2019, while the record low temperature was −7.7 °C (18.1 °F) on 4 January 1993.

Climate data for Tarascon (1991–2020 normals, extremes 1990–present)
Month	Jan	Feb	Mar	Apr	May	Jun	Jul	Aug	Sep	Oct	Nov	Dec	Year
Record high °C (°F)	21.1 (70.0)	23.6 (74.5)	27.3 (81.1)	30.7 (87.3)	35.5 (95.9)	43.0 (109.4)	38.9 (102.0)	40.4 (104.7)	35.1 (95.2)	31.0 (87.8)	25.0 (77.0)	20.4 (68.7)	43.0 (109.4)
Mean daily maximum °C (°F)	10.9 (51.6)	12.4 (54.3)	16.5 (61.7)	19.4 (66.9)	23.7 (74.7)	28.2 (82.8)	31.2 (88.2)	30.8 (87.4)	25.8 (78.4)	20.7 (69.3)	14.8 (58.6)	11.3 (52.3)	20.5 (68.9)
Daily mean °C (°F)	7.1 (44.8)	8.0 (46.4)	11.4 (52.5)	14.0 (57.2)	18.0 (64.4)	22.1 (71.8)	24.8 (76.6)	24.5 (76.1)	20.2 (68.4)	16.1 (61.0)	10.9 (51.6)	7.6 (45.7)	15.4 (59.7)
Mean daily minimum °C (°F)	3.4 (38.1)	3.5 (38.3)	6.2 (43.2)	8.6 (47.5)	12.3 (54.1)	16.0 (60.8)	18.5 (65.3)	18.2 (64.8)	14.6 (58.3)	11.5 (52.7)	7.0 (44.6)	4.0 (39.2)	10.3 (50.6)
Record low °C (°F)	−7.7 (18.1)	−6.8 (19.8)	−6.2 (20.8)	−0.7 (30.7)	4.4 (39.9)	8.3 (46.9)	10.5 (50.9)	10.7 (51.3)	5.7 (42.3)	0.5 (32.9)	−4.7 (23.5)	−7.5 (18.5)	−7.7 (18.1)
Average precipitation mm (inches)	51.3 (2.02)	33.0 (1.30)	36.8 (1.45)	63.2 (2.49)	46.9 (1.85)	31.2 (1.23)	28.4 (1.12)	31.9 (1.26)	96.4 (3.80)	89.1 (3.51)	92.5 (3.64)	43.1 (1.70)	643.8 (25.37)
Average precipitation days (≥ 1.0 mm)	5.3	4.5	4.5	6.3	5.8	3.4	2.7	3.1	5.1	6.0	7.4	5.3	59.4
Source: Meteociel

== Personalities ==
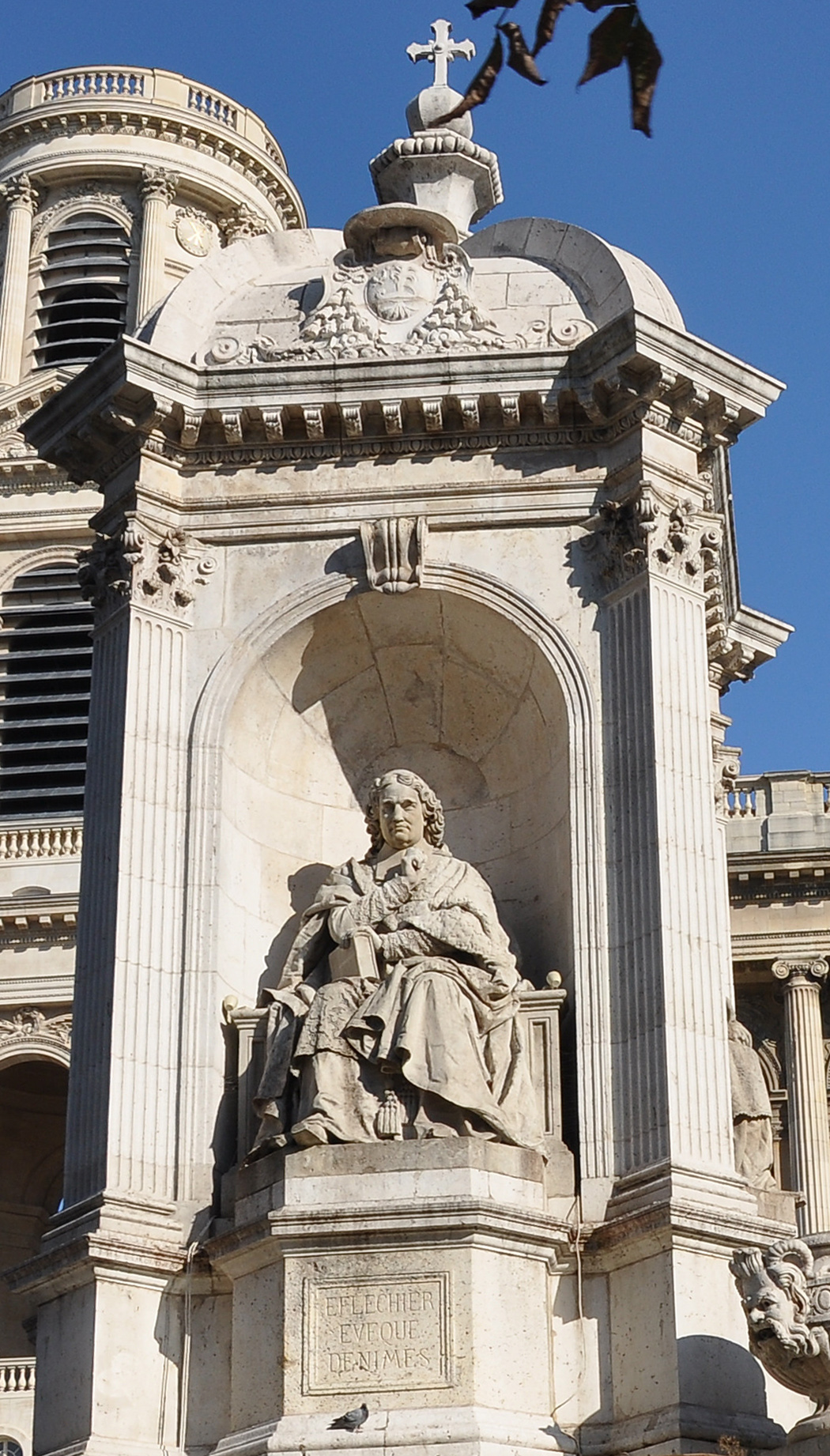
Statue of Esprit Fléchier at the Fountain of the Four Bishops, in the center of Place Saint-Sulpice in Paris. Fléchier studied and later taught at the Collège of Tarascon.

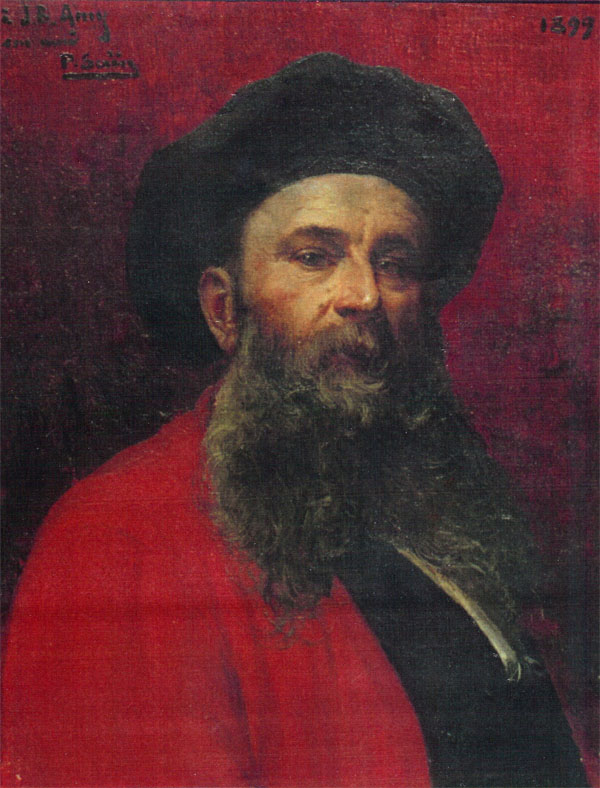
The sculptor Jean Barnabé Amy was born in Tarascon

- Ricau de Tarascon (active between 1200 and 1240), Provençal knight and troubadour
- Joseph ben Abba Mari ben Joseph ben Jacob Caspi (1280—1345), prominent Jewish medieval philosopher, lived in Tarascon
- Immanuel ben Jacob Bonfils (c. 1300 – 1377), Jewish mathematician and astronomer, lived in Tarascon
- René d'Anjou (1409–1480), lived in Tarascon
- Claude de Bectoz (1490–1547), female writer and philosopher of the Renaissance, abbess of the Benedictine Monastery Saint Honorat, lived in Tarascon
- Honoré du Laurens (1564–1612), archbishop of Embrun, was born in Tarascon
- André du Laurens (1558–1609), physician, was born in Tarascon
- Sauvaire Intermet (c.1573–1657), musician and composer, was born in Tarascon
- Esprit Fléchier (1632–1710), preacher and author, Bishop of Nîmes from 1687, studied and later taught at the Collège of Tarascon
- Jean Gilles (1668–1705), composer, was born in Tarascon
- Joseph Privat de Molières (1676–1742), physicist and mathematician, was born in Tarascon
- Léon Ménard (1706–1767), lawyer and historical writer, was born in Tarascon
- Jean-Esprit Isnard (1707–1781), pipe organ builder, lived and died in Tarascon
- Hippolyte de Sade de Vaudronne (1710–1780), French Navy officer, was born in Tarascon
- Conrad Mouren (1731–1795), secretary of the Municipality of Tarascon.
- Urbain Audibert (1789–1846), nurseryman, was born in Tarascon
- Joseph Desanat (1796–1873), poet and journal editor, was born in Tarascon
- Étienne-Michel Faillon (1800–1870), Catholic historian, was born in Tarascon
- Joseph Roumanille (1818–1891), poet and one of the founders of Félibrige, studied and worked there from 1834 to 1839
- Jean Barnabé Amy (1839–1907), sculptor, was born in Tarascon
- Brémonde de Tarascon (1858–1898), poet who wrote in the Occitan language
- S. R. Crockett (1859–1914) Scottish novelist, lived and died in Tarascon
- Jean Théveney (1866–1960), army officer, was born in Tarascon
- Louis Pasquet (1867–1931), politician, was born in Tarascon
- Marius Chaîne (1873–1960), Jesuit, scholar of Ethiopic and Coptic philology, was born in Tarascon
- Jean-François Rodriguez (born 1957), professional racing cyclist, was born in Tarascon
- Sébastien Fidani (born 1978), professional footballer, was born in Tarascon
- Youssef Hajdi (born 1979), actor, was born in Tarascon
- Driss Himmes (born 1983), professional footballer, was born in Tarascon
- Yoan Benyahya (born 1987), professional footballer, was born in Tarascon

== Twin towns ==
- Beit She'an, Israel
- Elmshorn, Germany – since 1987
- Fraga, Spain
- Neviano degli Arduini, Italy
- Porrentruy, Switzerland – since 1969
- Tarascon-sur-Ariège, France – since 2017

== Transportation ==
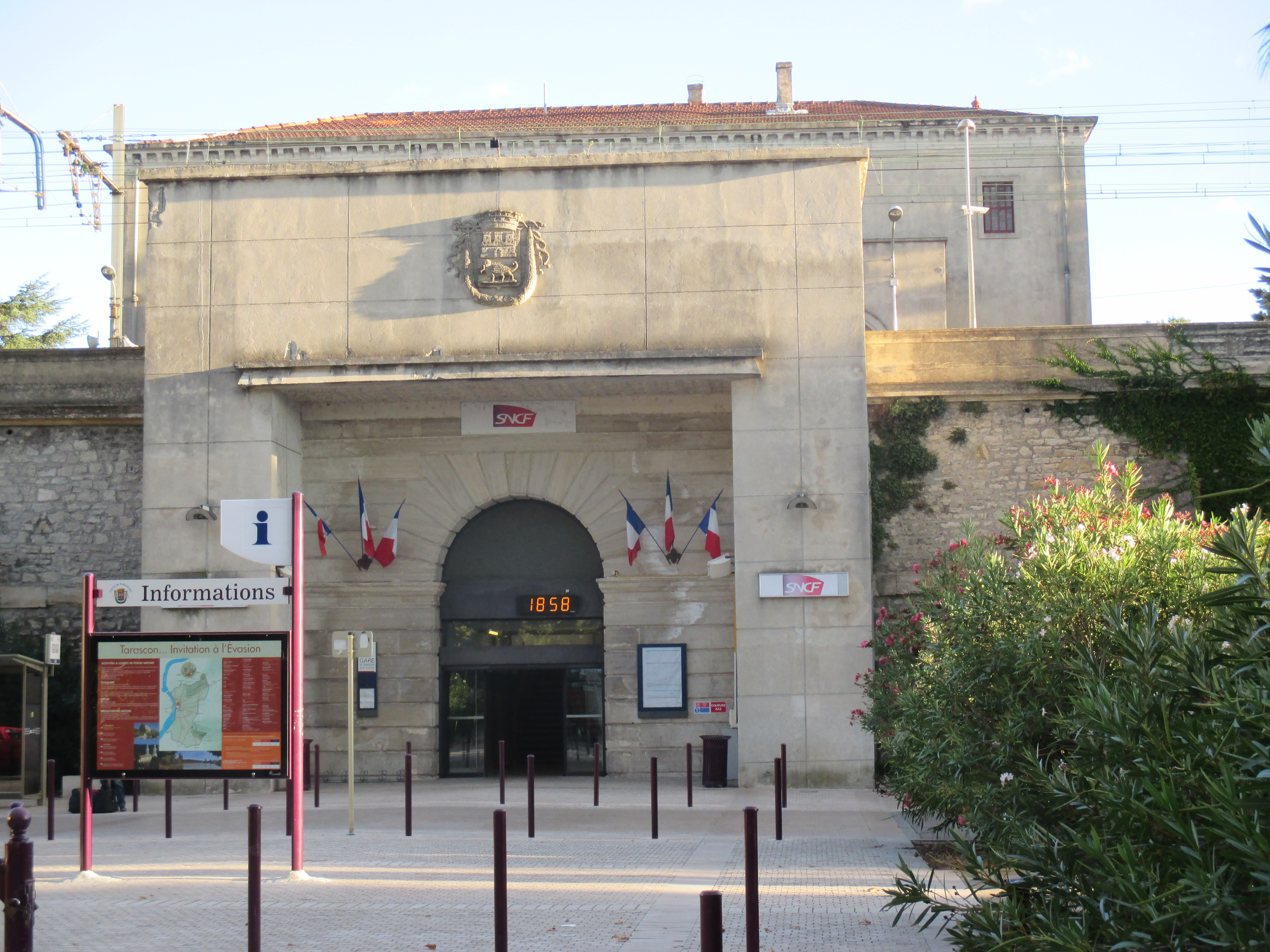
Train station

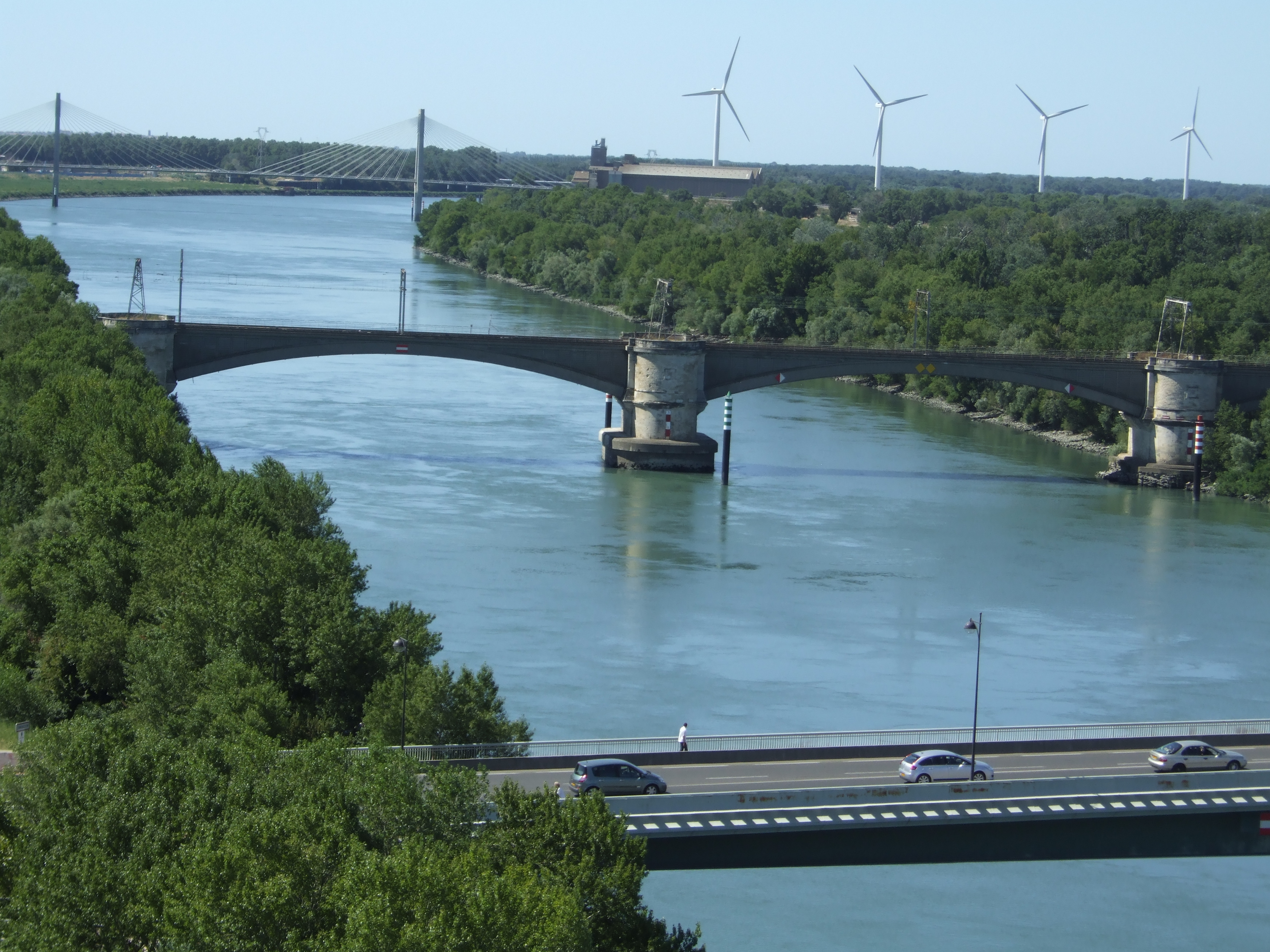
Bridges across the Rhone between Tarascon and Beaucaire (right).

Tarascon is served by a train station and several bus lines.

The GR 6 footpath runs through Tarascon.

== See also ==
- Treaty of Tarascon (1291)
- Pas de la Bergère, a pas d'armes held in Tarascon in 1449
- Alpilles
- Communes of the Bouches-du-Rhône department
