= Saint-Honorat Abbey (Tarascon) =

Former abbey in Bouches-du-Rhône, France

Coordinates: 43.8063°N 4.6557°E

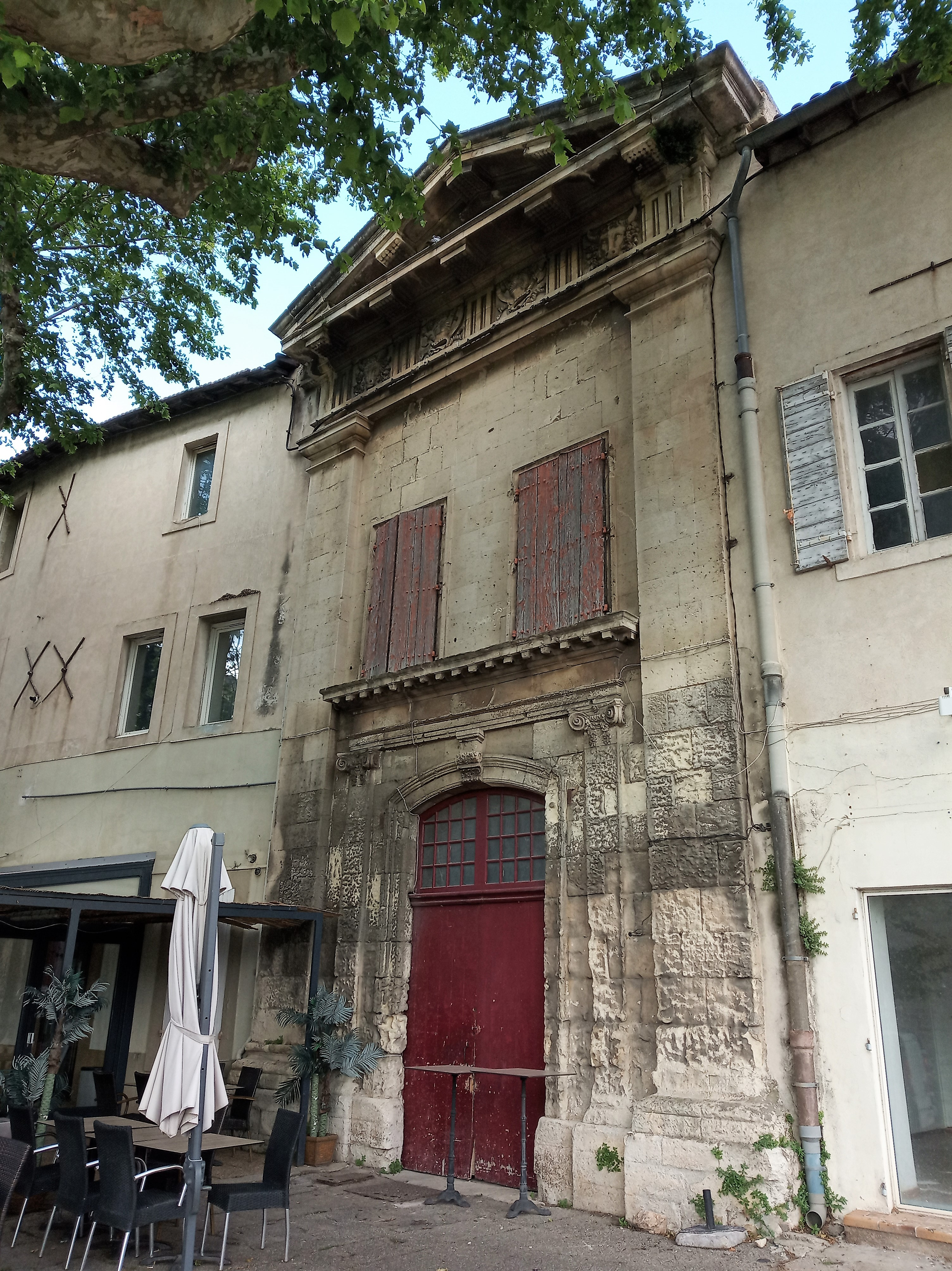
Facade of the former Saint-Honorat Abbey in Tarascon

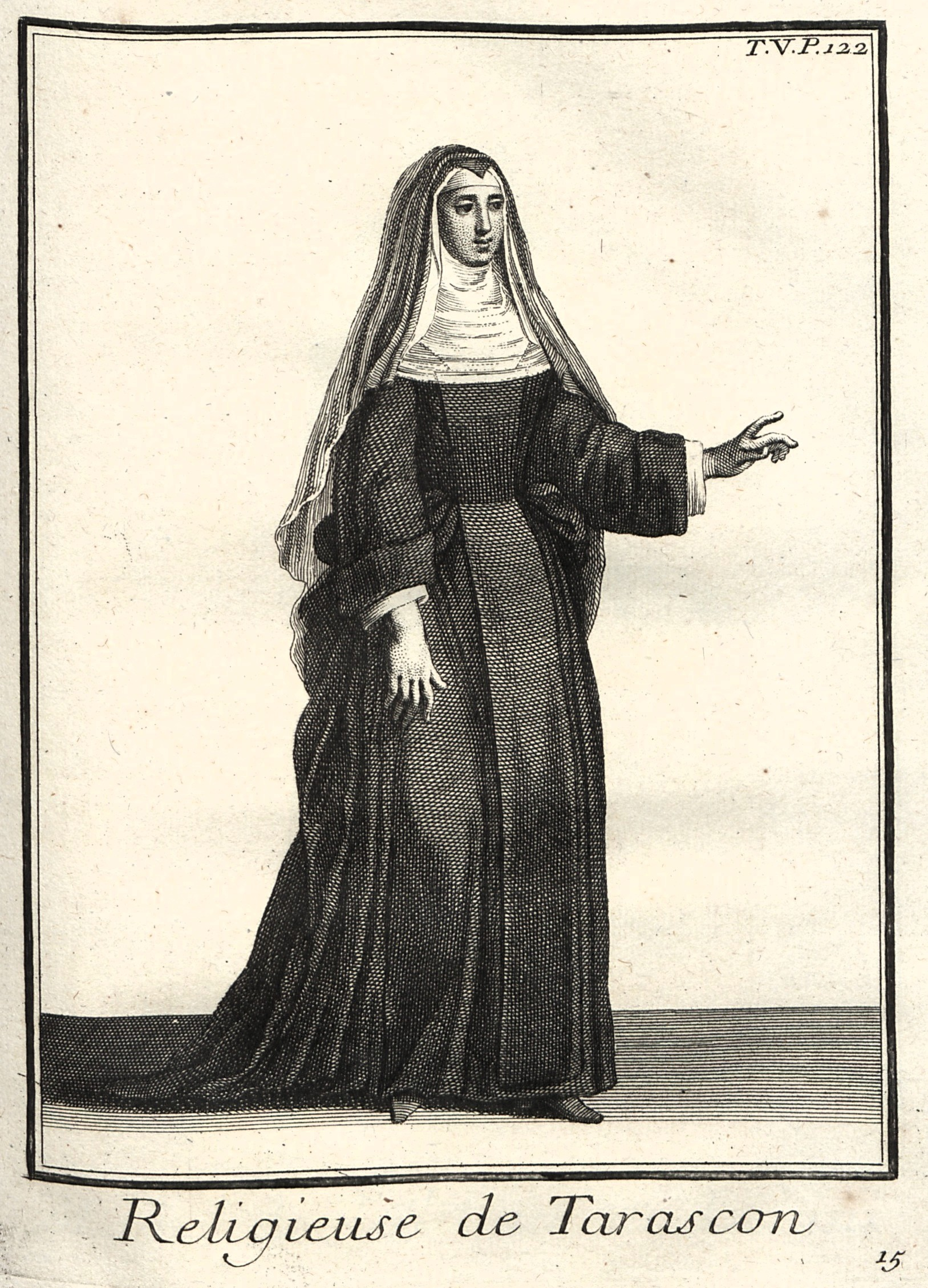
Nun from Saint-Honorat Abbey in 1714.

Saint-Honorat Abbey (Abbaye Notre-Dame et Saint-Honorat de Tarascon) was a convent of Benedictine nuns in Tarascon, then within the Diocese of Avignon in Bouches-du-Rhône. Founded in 1352 it was suppressed in 1790 in the early stages of the French Revolution.

== See also ==
- Lérins Abbey
- Claude de Bectoz
