= Joseph Privat de Molières =

French physicist and mathematician

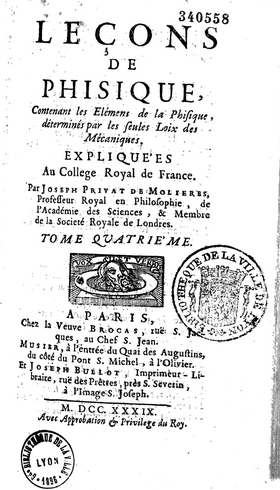
The title-page of Leçons de Phisique; vol. 4, 1739)

Joseph Privat de Molières (26 May 1676 – 12 May 1742) was a French physicist and mathematician, a member of the Académie des sciences and professor at the Collège royal.

== Biography ==
Joseph Privat de Molières was born in Tarascon, province of Provence. He died in Paris.

== Publications ==
- Leçons de mathématique nécessaires pour l'intelligence des principes de physique qui s'enseignent actuellement au Collège royal, 1725
- Leçons de physique contenant les éléments de la physique déterminés par les seules lois des mécaniques, expliquées au Collège royal de France, 4 vol., 1734–1739
- Traité synthétique des lignes du premier et du second genre, ou Éléments de géométrie dans l'ordre de leur génération. Ces lignes sont la ligne droite, le cercle, l'ellipse, la parabole & l'hyperbole, 1740
- « Dissertation posthume sur l'existence de la force centrale dans un tourbillon sphérique » in Principes du système des petits tourbillons, mis à la portée de tout le monde et appliqués aux phénomènes les plus généraux par Jean-Baptiste Le Corgne de Launay, 1743

=== Histoire de l'Académie royale des sciences ===
- Sur la conciliation des deux règles astronomiques de Kepler dans le système des tourbillons, dans Histoire de l'Académie royale des sciences – Année 1733, Imprimerie royale, Paris, 1735, p. 92–98
- Sur les mouvements en tourbillon, dans Histoire de l'Académie royale des sciences – Année 1728, chez Durand, Paris, 1753, p. 97–103
- Sur les tourbillons célestes, dans Histoire de l'Académie royale des sciences – Année 1729, Imprimerie royale, 1731, p. 87–91
- Sur la résistance de l'éther au mouvement des corps, dans Histoire de l'Académie royale des sciences – Année 1731, chez Panckoucke, Paris, 1764, p. 66–72

=== Mémoires de l'Académie royale des sciences ===
- Loix générales du mouvement dans le tourbillon sphérique. Lemmes, dans Mémoires de l'Académie royale des sciences – Année 1728, chez Durand, Paris, 1753, p. 245–267
- Problème physico-mathématique dont la solution tend à servir de réponse à une des objections de M. Newton contre la possibilité de tourbillons calesses, dans Mémoires de l'Académie royale des sciences – Année 1729, Imprimerie royale, Paris, 1731, p. 235–244
- Les loix astronomiques des vitesses des planètes dans leurs orbes expliquées méchaniquement dans le système du plein, dans Mémoires de l'Académie royale des sciences – Année 1733, Imprimerie royale, Paris, 1735, p. 301–312
