= Driss Himmes =

French football player (born 1983)

Personal information
- Date of birth: September 30, 1983 (age 43)
- Place of birth: Tarascon, France
- Height: 1.77 m (5 ft 10 in)
- Position: Midfielder

Team information
- Current team: Alès

Senior career*
Years	Team	Apps	(Gls)
2001–2004	Beaucaire		
2004–2005	Arles		
2005–2006	Narbonne		
2006–2008	Arles	69	(15)
2008–2009	Cassis Carnoux	33	(5)
2009–2010	Arles-Avignon	9	(0)
2010–2014	Martigues	81	(12)
2014–	Alès	25	(4)
- * Club domestic league appearances and goals as of 10:25, 30 May 2015 (UTC)

Driss Himmes (born September 30, 1983) is a French professional football player who currently plays for Olympique Alès.
