= Tartarin of Tarascon =

1872 novel by Alphonse Daudet

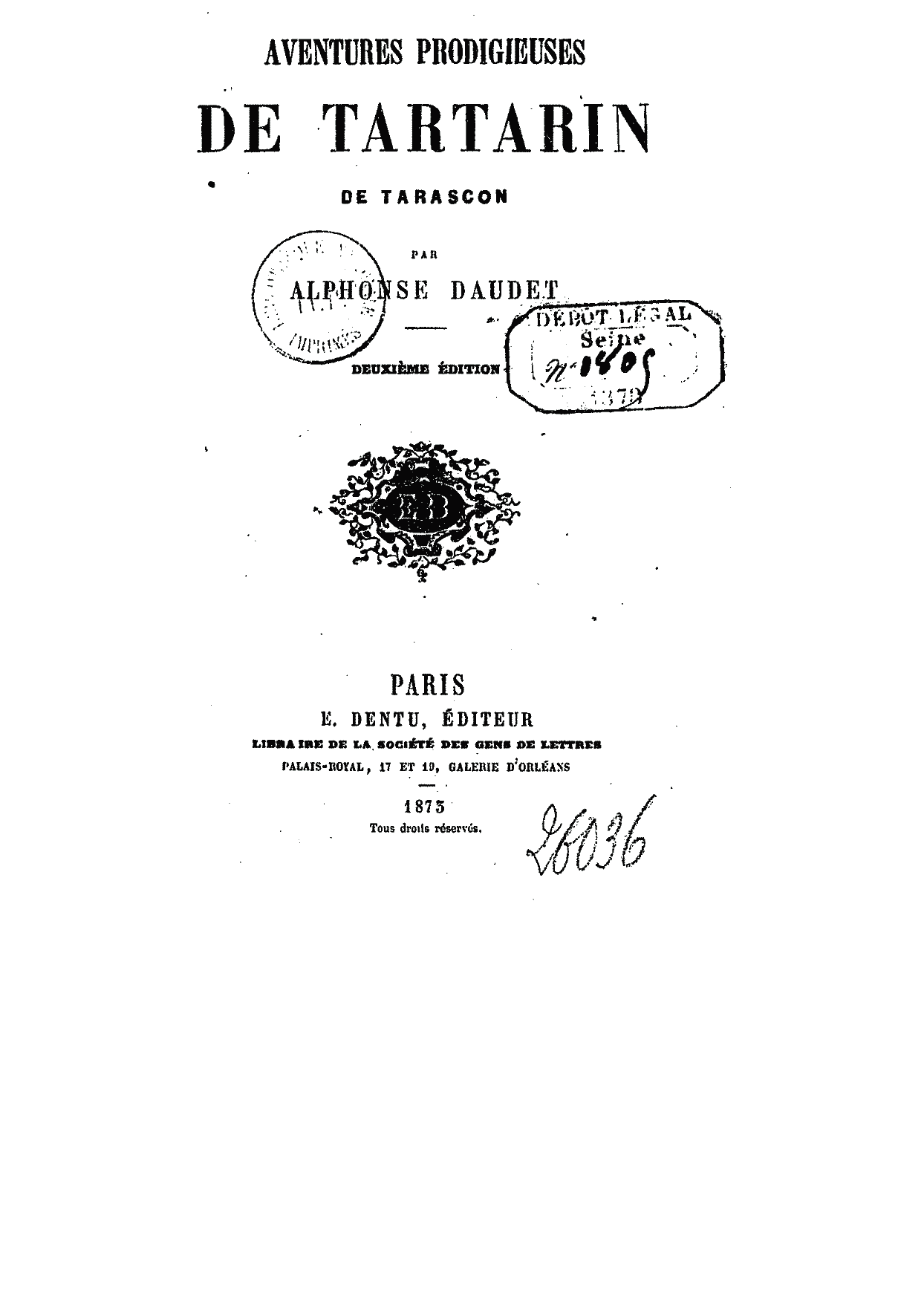
- Author: Alphonse Daudet
- Original title: Tartarin de Tarascon
- Language: French
- Genre: Novel
- Publication date: 1872
- Publication place: France
- Media type: Print (hard & paperback)
- Pages: 92 (Kessinger Publishing paperback edition)
- ISBN: 1-4191-5081-2
- OCLC: 62297553

Tartarin of Tarascon (French: Tartarin de Tarascon) is an 1872 novel written by the French author Alphonse Daudet.

== Synopsis ==
The Provençal town of Tarascon is so enthusiastic about hunting that no game lives anywhere near it, and its inhabitants resort to telling hunting stories and throwing their own caps in the air to shoot at them. Tartarin, a plump middle-aged man, is the chief "cap-hunter", but following his enthusiastic reaction to seeing an Atlas lion in a travelling menagerie, the over-imaginative town understands him to be planning a hunting expedition to Algeria.

So as not to lose face, Tartarin is forced to go, after gathering an absurd mass of equipment and weapons. On the boat from Marseille to Algiers, he hooks up with a conman posing as a Montenegrin prince who takes advantage of him in multiple ways. Tartarin's gullibility causes him a number of misadventures until he returns home penniless but covered in glory after shooting a tame, blind lion.

A sequel Tartarin sur les Alpes appeared in 1885, followed by Port-Tarascon in 1890.

== Legacy ==
Since 1985, a small museum in the town of Tarascon-sur-Rhône is dedicated to the fictional character Tartarin. A festival is held in Tarascon every year on the last Sunday of June to remember Tartarin and the unrelated Tarasque.

== Film, TV or theatrical adaptations ==
Tartarin de Tarascon has been adapted into cinematic form three times, in 1908, 1934, and 1962, with each work being titled after its point of reference. The earliest cinematic version was a short, filmed in 1908 by the pioneering magician-cum-director, Georges Méliès.

The second effort was the 1934 film, which was directed by Frenchman Raymond Bernard and starred Raimu in the role of Tartarin, as well as Sinoël, Fernand Charpin, and Charles Camus in other principal roles.

The 1962 film was directed by Francis Blanche and Raoul André, and starred Francis Blanche, Alfred Adam, Jacqueline Maillan, Bourvil, Robert Porte.

Belgian composer Arthur Meulemans (1884 -1966) created the "Ouverture voor Tartarin de Tarascon" for orchestra in 1955.
