= Église Saint-Jacques de Tarascon =

Church in Tarascon, France

Coordinates: 43.8051°N 4.66048°E

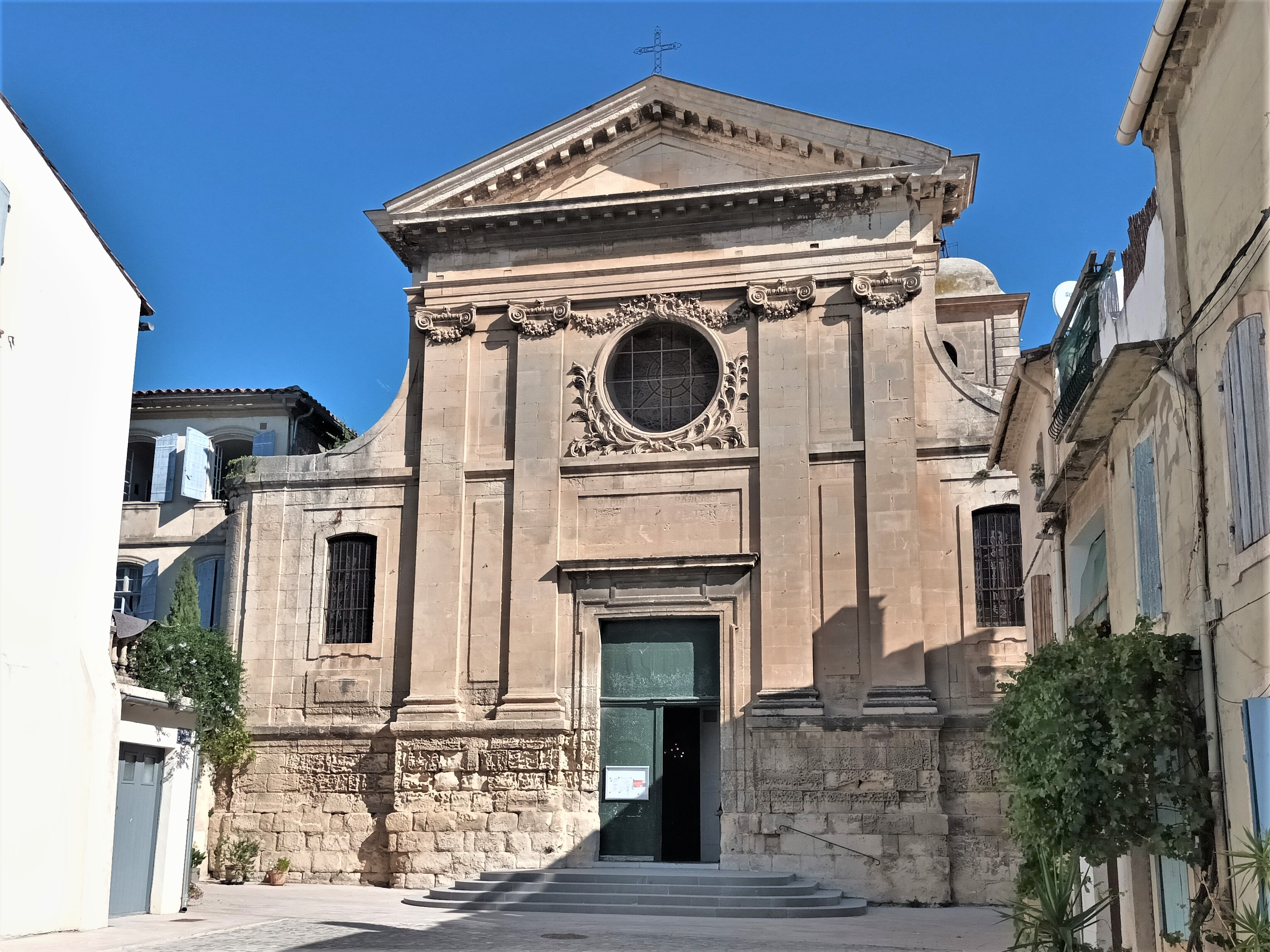
Église Saint-Jacques de Tarascon

The Église Saint-Jacques de Tarascon is a Roman Catholic church in Tarascon, Bouches-du-Rhône, France. It was built between 1740 and 1750 and was listed as a Monument historique in 1994.
