= Château de Beaucaire =

11th-century ruined castle in France

- Part of Beaucaire, France
- Gard
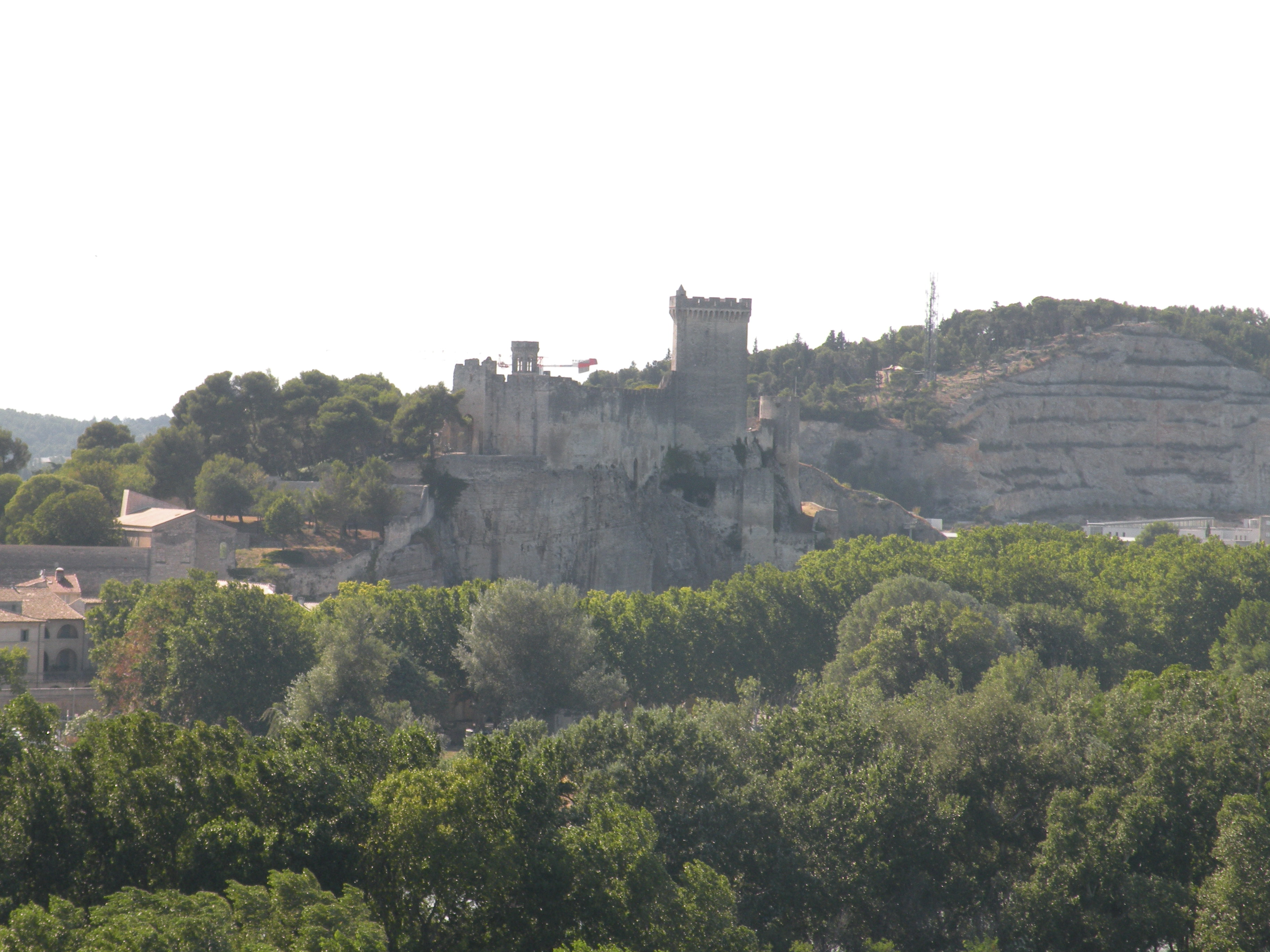

Site information
- Type: Castle
- Open to the public: Yes
- Condition: Ruined

Location
- Location within France
- Coordinates: 43.8099°N 4.6443°E

Site history
- Built: 11th Century
- Built by: Counts of Toulouse
- In use: 1180 – 1632
- Materials: Limestone
- Events: Hundred Years' War; Albigensian Crusade; Wars of Religion

Monument historique
- Official name: Château de Beaucaire
- Type: Classé
- Designated: 1862
- Reference no.: PA00102980

The Château de Beaucaire (Provençal: Castèu de Bèucaire) is a ruined medieval castle in the commune of Beaucaire in the Gard département of France. First built by the Counts of Toulouse, the castle served as an important point in the Albigensian Crusade and was torn down on Richelieu's orders in the 16th century. The castle is owned by the commune and is open to the public, and has been listed since 1862 as a monument historique by the French Ministry of Culture.

== History ==
Built over the site of a Roman settlement, the castle was first constructed in 1180 by the Counts of Toulouse to protect Beaucaire after multiple invasions of the town by groups including the Visigoths and Burgundians and to rival Tarascon Castle across the river. At the start of the Albigensian Crusade, the castle was captured and occupied by Simon de Montfort's troops in 1209, but was later recaptured by Raymond VII in 1216.

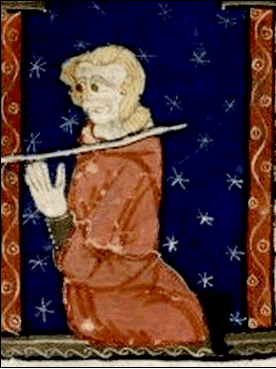
Raymond VII, Count of Toulouse

After the annexation of the Languedoc in 1229, the castle was demolished and completely rebuilt by Louis IX, and Beaucaire became the seat of one of the two seneschalships created along with Carcassonne. In response to the Hundred Years' War, the castle underwent extensive rebuilding, including an extension of the ramparts in 1350 and the widening of the city walls in 1355. (destroyed by Louis VIII to punish the Beaucairois for their loyalty to the Counts of Toulouse).

Beaucaire suffered severely during the Wars of Religion in the 16th century when both the town and its castle were destroyed on the Cardinal de Richelieu’s orders in 1632. The existing structures date from the 12th and 16th centuries, with other elements from various times in the Middle Ages. In 1846, the chapel of the Château de Beaucaire became the first monument in Beaucaire to be classified as a Historic Monument, before the castle itself was listed in 1862. During restoration, Roman remains were unearthed: a Gallo-Roman funerary stele known as the Centonaires, a capital, and fragments of medieval columns were found

== Features ==
The castle used to be protected by a wall, the trace of which can still be followed. It includes a strange polygonal tower perched on a rocky spur, the façades dominating the sheer drop, and a fine round corner tower. Once inside the walls, a staircase leads to a small Romanesque chapel with a charming, sculpted tympanum, and then to the musée Auguste Jacquet. The museum has exhibits on the region's archaeology (dating back more than 40,000 years) and popular arts and traditions.

Beyond its frequentation by tourists passionate about local culture, the castle is sometimes used for filmed historical reenactments, series or films. This intermunicipal association also undertook work to reopen the castle’s main gate in 2014. This gate, which was originally intended as an entrance for garrisons, now opens onto open space and offers visitors a panoramic view of the landscape

== See also ==
- List of castles in France
