= List of works by Auguste Carli =

Auguste Carli was born on July 12, 1868, in Marseille, Bouches-du-Rhône, and many of his works can be seen in Marseille itself and in the Bouches-du-Rhône and Gard regions. This list attempts to cover his recorded works.

== Works ==
Name	Location	Date	Notes
"Faune dansant"	Beaux-Arts de Paris, l'école nationale supérieure.	1895	Carli was taught in the École des Beaux-Arts de Marseille by Émile Aldebert and in 1890, as a result of winning the annual college prize, he was given a bursary which enabled him to travel to Paris to further his studies at the Beaux-arts there and in 1896 he was runner-up in that year's prestigious Prix de Rome for sculpture. Whilst a student at the Beaux-Arts., Carli would have executed many drawings and several of these are held in the college's collection of ex-pupil's work, including "Faune dansant" which Carli submitted in the college's "Prix Bridan" competition for 1895, winning second prize. At the Beaux-Arts, Carli was a pupil of both Louis-Ernest Barrias and Pierre-Jules Cavalier.
Life study ("Figure modelée d'après nature")	Beaux-Arts de Paris, l'école nationale supérieure. Paris.	1895	A work in plaster executed by Carli for the college and submitted for a competition for their "Grande Médaille". The work is held by the college in their collection of the works of former pupils.
"Dante aux enfers, le combat des démons"	Musée des Beaux-Arts de Marseille	1898	This plaster bas-relief was shown at the 1898 Paris Salon and was purchased by the French State. It depicts Dante and Virgil watching two demons fighting. In the exhibition catalogue it was entitled "Combat de démons". A fragment of the work is held by the Musée des Beaux-Arts de Marseille.
"La Fierté"	Beaux-Arts de Paris, l'école nationale supérieure. Paris.	1898	This plaster bust was executed by Carli whilst a student at the college and entered for the competition "la Tête d'expression".
"Sainte Véronique et le Christ"	Cathédrale Notre-Dame-de-la-Major. Marseille	1900	The plaster version of this Carli composition was shown at the Paris Salon of 1900 and purchased by the State. In the same year Carli executed a version in white marble and this can be seen in the Cathédrale Notre-Dame-de-la-Major. Sainte Véronique et le Christ
"Le Rhône"	Marseille. Musée des Beaux-Arts	Date not known	A bronze statuette acquired by the museum in 1930.
Bust of Carmen	Marseille. Musée des Beaux-Arts	Date not known	This marble bust is located in the Opéra de Marseille
"Praxitèle" or "Le penseur"	Parc Henri Barbusse. Issy-les-Moulineaux	Date not known	This study of a pensive Praxiteles is one of several sculptures in this public park.
Monument to Joseph Thome	Bagnols-sur-Cèze	1900	Two sculptors were involved with this monument in Bagnols-sur-Cèze's rue Georges-Besson. The bronze bust depicting Joseph Thome is by Laurent Marqueste whilst Carli executed the bronze medallion which depicts Thome's grandson André Thome the politician and deputy for Seine-et-Oise who was killed at Verdun in 1916. The bust sits at the top of an obelisk and the medallion is attached to the main face of that obelisk. There are marble plaques on the obelisk which record Thome's role as a benefactor of Bagnols and recall the death of André Thome.
"Omphale"	Blois; Musée du château de Blois	Date not known	Terracotta figure acquired by the Blois museum in 1933. This composition was subsequently executed in white marble
"La Lutte de Jacob avec l'ange"	Clermont-Ferrand.Place Michel de l'Hôpital	1902	This marble work was also entitled "La Lutte de l'Esprit pour triompher de la Matière" . Carli's composition depicts a man fighting with an angel and the inscription reads "ESPRIT ET LA MATIERE par CARLI" The working model in plaster was shown at the Paris Salon in 1902 and it was purchased for the Marseille Musée des Beaux-Arts. Carli made two maquettes of the work, one with the angel's wings spread and the second with wings folded.
Bust of the Marquise de Gueidan	Gardenne	1903	The last Marquise de Gueidan was a major benefactor of Gardenne and a bust was executed by Carli and erected in the Marquise's honour. The statue is known by the citizens of Gardenne as "La Bonne Personne".
Caisse d'Épargne	Marseille	1904	The Groupe Caisse d'Épargne is a French semi-cooperative banking group, founded in 1818, with around 4700 branches in the country. This Marseille Caisse d'Épargne building was inaugurated in July 1904. The architect was Albert Tournaire and Carli's sculpture is positioned on one corner of the building. It is entitled "La Prévoyance dans ses fonctions" and in Carli's composition the bank are represented by a female figure holding up a "savings book" and surrounded by workers, farmers and pensioners, some of the groups to whom the cooperative would offer support and protection. A blacksmith offers up money to the safe-keeping of the bank and the pensioners are a reminder of a peaceful retirement which savings can ensure.
Fontaine d'Amphitrite	Marseille. Place Joseph Étienne	1904	In 1904 the daughter of the shipowner Joseph Étienne commissioned this fountain in his memory. A plaque on the fountain records the names of some of Étienne's ships- "le Cèdre", "le Clarisse Louise", "le Goéland" and the " le Nicolas Étienne Jeune". Fontaine d'Amphitrite
Monument Monticelli	Palais Longchamp	1909	This work was shown at the Paris Salon of 1909. It celebrates the life of the painter Adolphe Joseph Thomas Monticelli Monument Monticelli
Bust of Paul Peytral	Marseille; Musée des Beaux-Arts		Bronze bust of the senator for Bouches-du-Rhone acquired by the museum in 1913.
Monument to Victor Leydet	Aix-en-Provence	1910	Shown at the 1910 Salon des Artistes Français. Originally a pedestal supported a bronze bust of Leydet with an allegory for Aix at his feet. The monument was inaugurated in December 1910. The bronze was taken and melted down by the occupying Germans in 1943 but later a smaller plaster bust, which had decorated Leydet's tomb in the local cemetery, replaced the bronze.
Gare Saint-Charles- "Marseille Colonie Grecque" and "Marseille Porte d'Orient"	Marseille	1911 to 1925	This principal railway station has a large flight of stairs designed by the architects Eugène Sénès and Léon Arnal and using reinforced concrete. The competition for the designs of the stairway, intended to improve movement between the town centre and the railway station forecourt, was opened in 1911but the 1914-1918 war delayed completion of the project until 1925. The stairs run from the railway station to the Boulevard d'Athènes. The area is the site of much sculptural work including a group of lions and children by Arry Bitter and the works "Marseille Colonie Grecque" and "Marseille Porte d'Orient" by Carli. There are also six small bronze groups representing the produce of Provence. These are by Henri Raybaud and cover "les vendages", "les fruits", "la pêche", "les fleurs", "la moisson" and "la chasse". At bottom of either side of the main stairs are two large sculptures by Louis Botinelly, one, called "Colonies d'Asie" represents colonial Asia and the other, called "Colonies d'Afrique", represents colonial Africa. "Marseille Porte de l'Orient' by Auguste Carli along the main staircase of the Gare Saint-Charles
Statue of Camille Pelletan	Place de la Ferrage. Salon de Provence	1922	This sculpture of the politician is carved from Cassis stone.

== War memorials ==
Name	Location	Date	Notes
Nîmes War Memorial	Square du 11 novembre. Nîmes	1924	By the end of the 1914-1918 war, 12,866 men of the Gard had lost their lives in the conflict and the Nîmes memorial is dedicated to their memory. The decision to erect a memorial was taken in 1920 and the town organized a competition to select the architect and sculptor which was won by the architect Henri Castan with sculpture by Carli. The memorial's inauguration took place on 13 October 1924, with the French President Gaston Doumergue officiating. The memorial comprises a sunken crypt, an arch ("arc de triomphe") forming an entry to that crypt and an ornate cast iron gate made by Tréchard. Carli's sculptures decorate the arch's sides. On the floor of the crypt there is a huge mosaic made by Patrizio et Frères of Marseille and the names of those 12,866 remembered are engraved on the crypt's walls. The arch itself carries a quotation from Victor Hugo. "Ceux qui pieusement sont morts pour la patrie/ont droit qu'à leur cercueil la foule vienne et prie;/entre les plus beaux noms leur nom est le plus beau/La voix d'un peuple entier les berce en leur tombeau"! Carli's haut relief on the right hand support comprises a female allegory for Nîmes urging a man in working clothes to enlist. The allegorical figure wears a crown depicting the Maison Carrée. By the man's side his wife holds a new-born child. In the relief on the left, the war is over, and the victors pay hommage to the dead. The female allegory now holds a wreath, and below her are three citizens, a soldier and a young girl carry flowers whilst a bare chested working man in apron and wearing clogs offers a wreath. They look towards the centre of the arch and the crypt.
War memorial (Monument aux morts)	Saint-Jean-du-Gard	1922	The memorial stands in the place Carnot and features a female allegory of a victorious France wearing a Roman helmet and antique costume and carrying a sword and flag. In a defiant pose, her left foot rests on the mouth of a canon.
War memorial (Monument aux morts)	Draguignan		Carli's composition includes a female allegory of the town of Draguignan who holds a palm. By her side is a French soldier who holds a wreath of laurel leaves.

== Miscellaneous ==
The cemetery here has several sculptures by Auguste Carli.
