= François Carli =

French sculptor

- Born: 11 April 1872; Marseille, Bouches-du-Rhône, France
- Died: 19 December 1957 (aged 85); Marseille, Bouches-du-Rhône, France
- Occupation: Sculptor
- Relatives: Auguste Carli (brother)

François Carli (11 April 1872 - 19 December 1957) was a French sculptor.

== Biography ==
=== Early life ===
François Carli was born on 11 April 1872 in Marseille, Bouches-du-Rhône, France. His older brother, Auguste Carli (1868-1930), was also a sculptor.

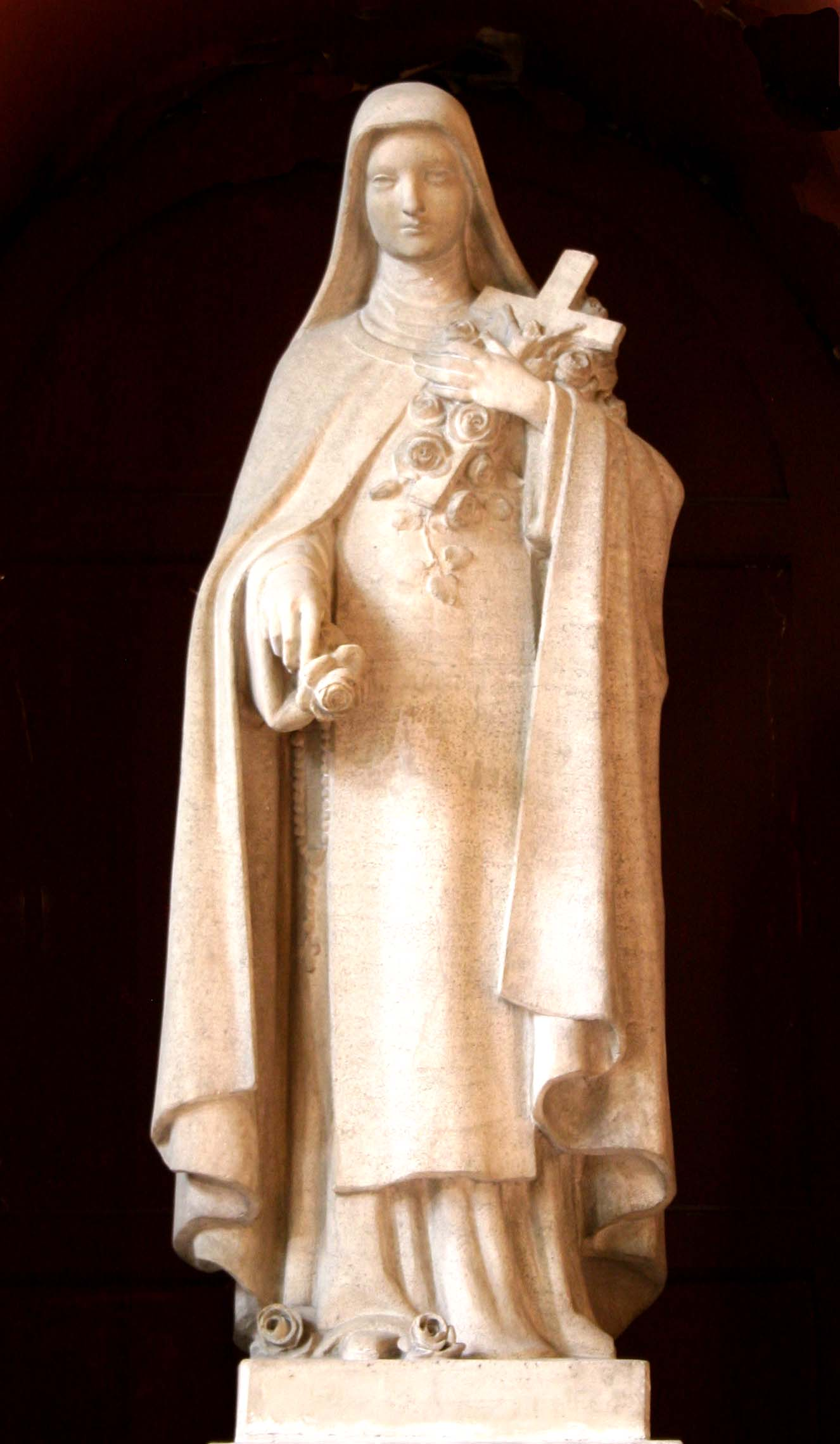
Sculpture of Saint Thérèse de Lisieux inside the Église Saint-Cannat in Marseille

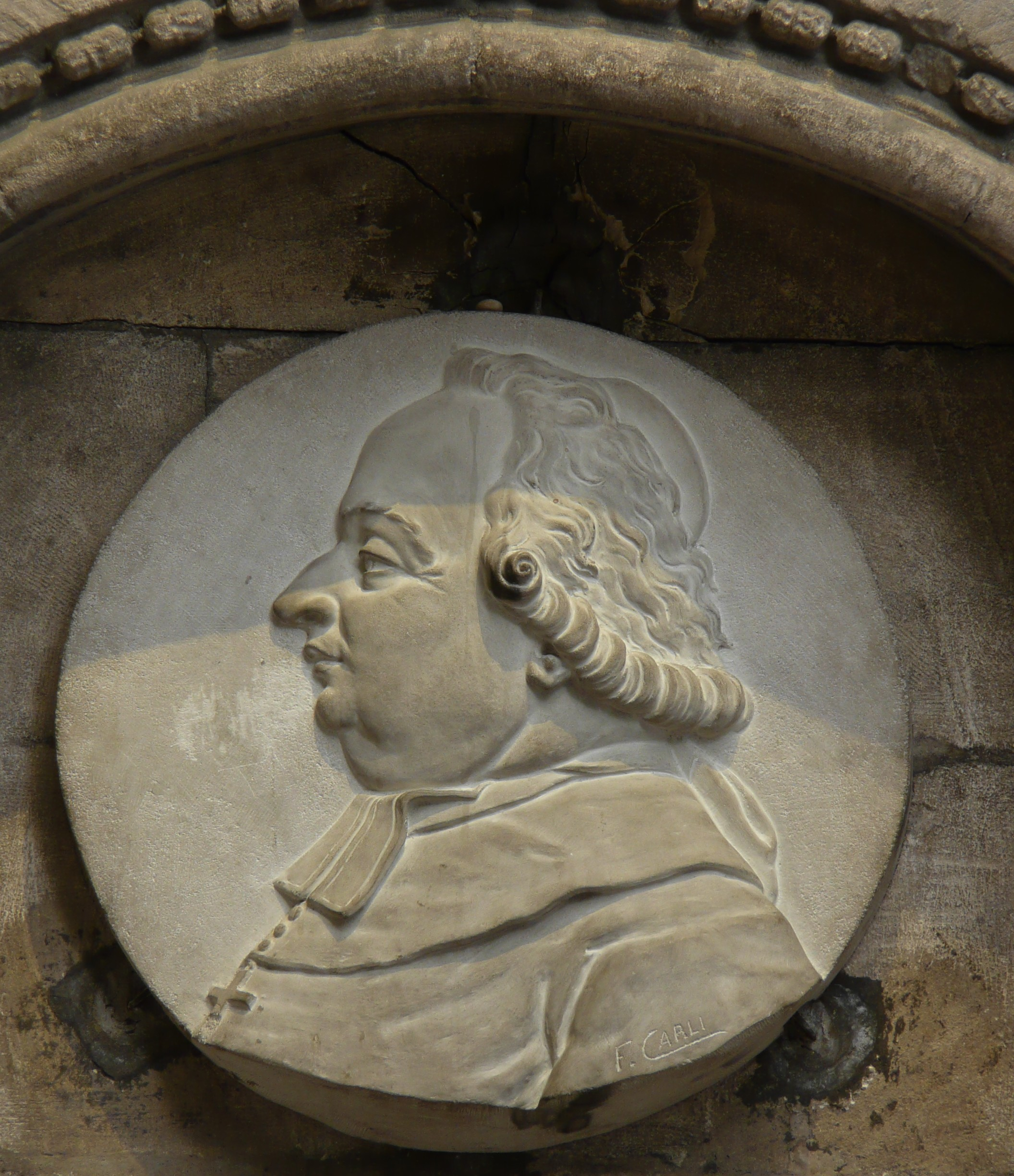
Sculpture of Jean Marie du Lau in the Church of St. Trophime, Arles

=== Career ===
He was a sculptor. From his atelier located at 6 Rue Jean Roque in Marseille, he sold many Tanagra figurines, Egyptian and Chaldean sculptures.

He designed a sculpture of Saint Thérèse of Lisieux (1873–1897), which was displayed in the Église Saint-Cannat in Marseille. Additionally, he did a sculpture of Jean Marie du Lau (1738-1792) for the Church of St. Trophime in Arles. He also designed a war memorial in Eyguières.

=== Personal life ===
In 1897, he married Jeanne Gondard, sister of sculptor Paul Gondard (1884-1953).

=== Death ===
He died on 19 December 1957 in Marseille.

=== Legacy ===
- The Place Auguste et François Carli, a town square in Marseille, is named for him and his brother.
