= Église Saint-Cannat =

Coordinates: 43.2982°N 5.3735°E

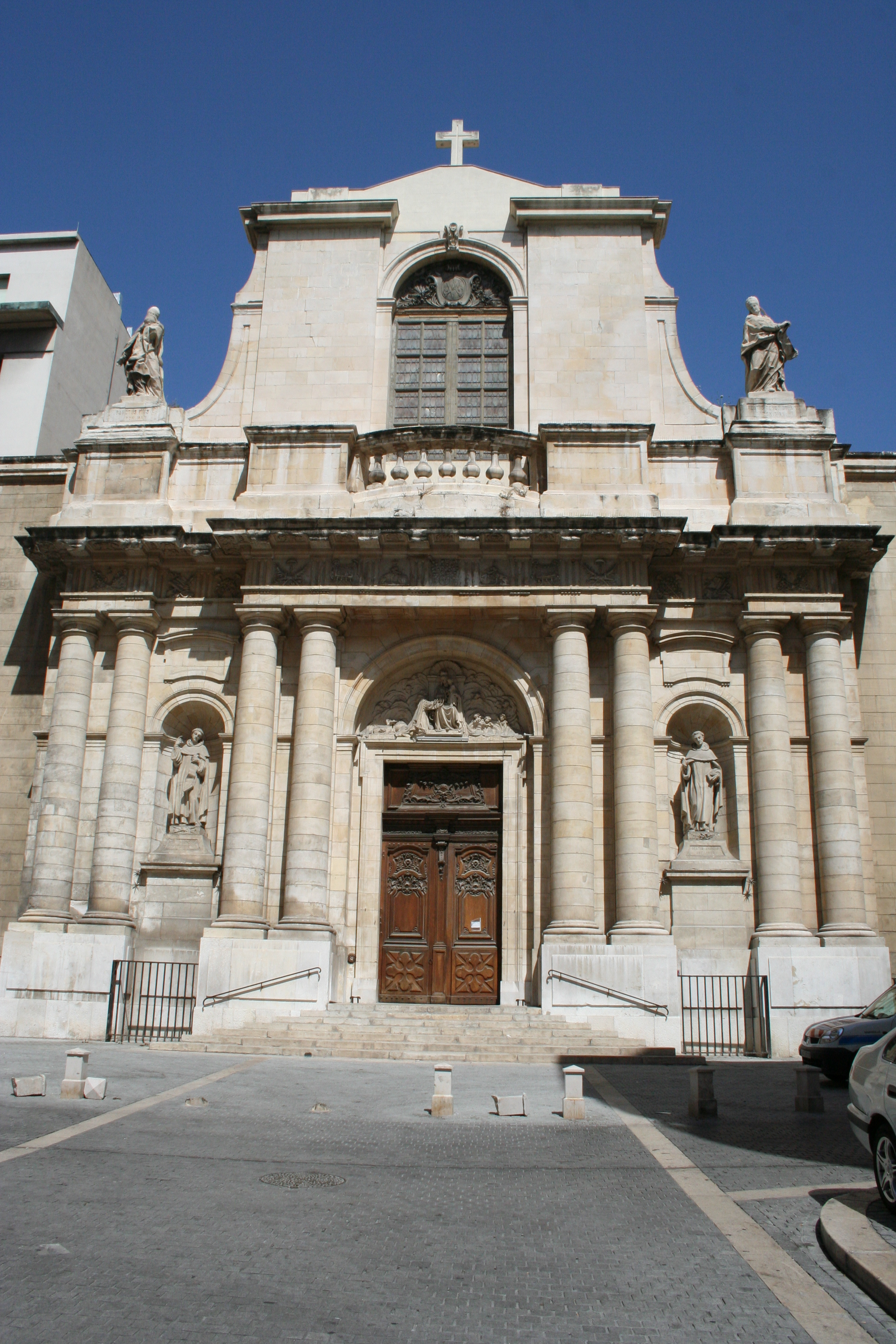
- Facade of the Église Saint-Cannat
- Église Saint-Cannat
- Location: 4, rue des Prêcheurs; Marseille 13001; Bouches-du-Rhône, Provence-Alpes-Côte d'Azur
- Country: France
- Denomination: Roman Catholic
- Tradition: Dominican Order

History
- Status: Cathedral
- Founded: December 31, 1526
- Dedicated: May 18, 1619

Architecture
- Heritage designation: Monument historique
- Designated: November 2, 1926
- Architectural type: Church

Administration
- Diocese: Roman Catholic Archdiocese of Marseille

Clergy
- Vicar: Hervé Giraud

The Église Saint-Cannat is a Roman Catholic church in Marseille.

== Location ==
It is located in the 1st arrondissement of Marseille. The exact address is 4, rue des Prêcheurs, 13001 Marseille.

== History ==
The church was named in honour of Canus Natus, a French Roman Catholic Saint from the fifth century.

Construction of the church building started on December 31, 1526, in the presence of Bernardin des Beaux. It was dedicated on May 18, 1619.

The facade was built from 1739 to 1744 by architect Joseph Gérard.

The church has a few works of art. Two paintings by Michel Serre (1658-1733) are displayed in the church: La vierge à l'enfant et le purgatoire and La purification de la Vierge. There is also a painting by Pierre Parrocel (1664–1739), representing the baptism of Christ. Additionally, one can see a sculpture of Saint Thérèse of Lisieux (1873–1897) designed by François Carli (1872-1957).

The pipe organ, designed by Jean-Esprit Isnard (1707-1781), dates back to 1747.

The church building has been listed as a Monument historique since November 2, 1926.

== At present ==
The church building is open on Mondays and Thursdays from 9 AM to 1 PM, on Wednesdays from 9 AM to 7 PM, and on Tuesday and Fridays from 9 AM to 12 PM. However, no Mass are said at present.

== Gallery ==
Église Saint-Cannat
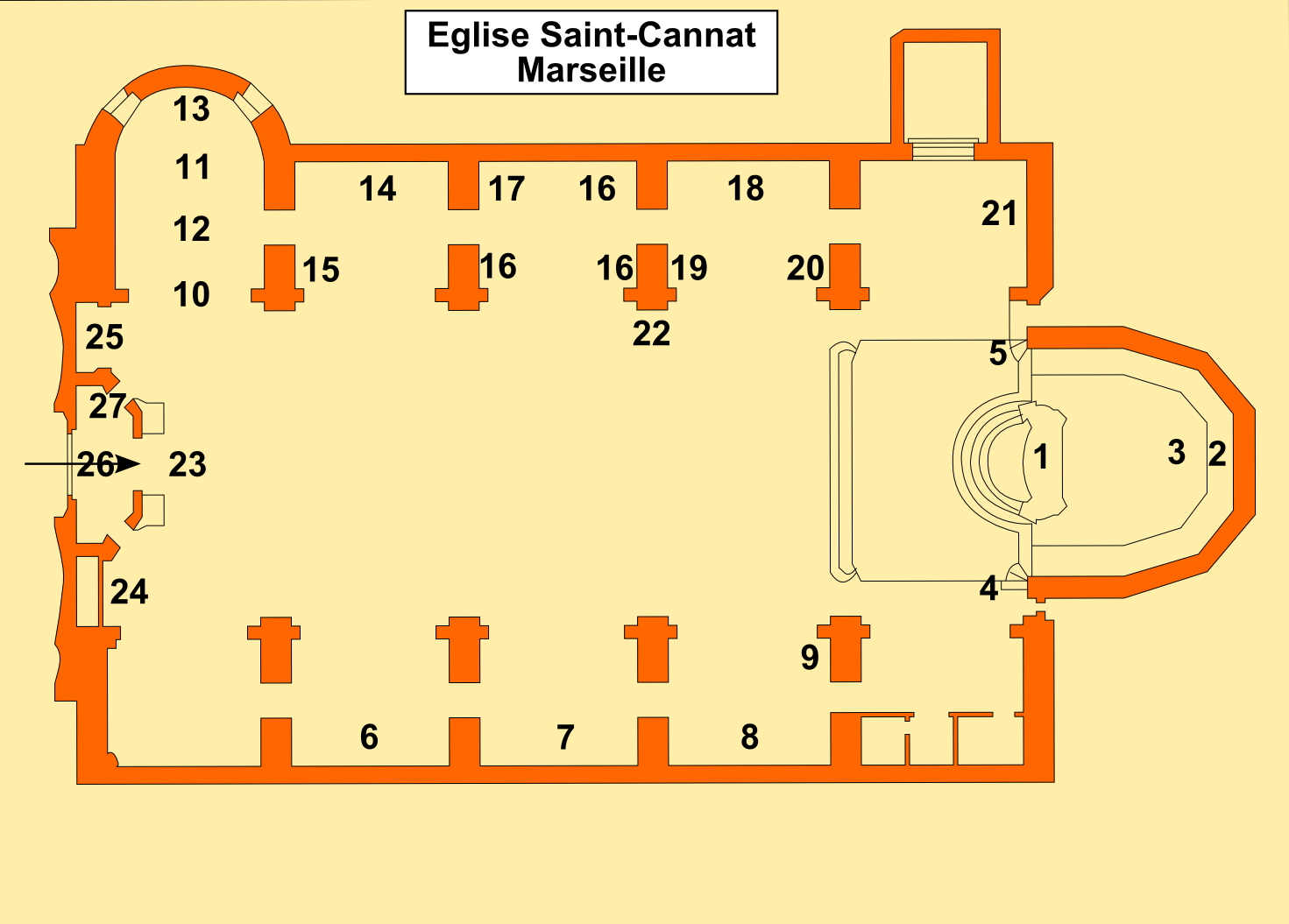
Map of the church

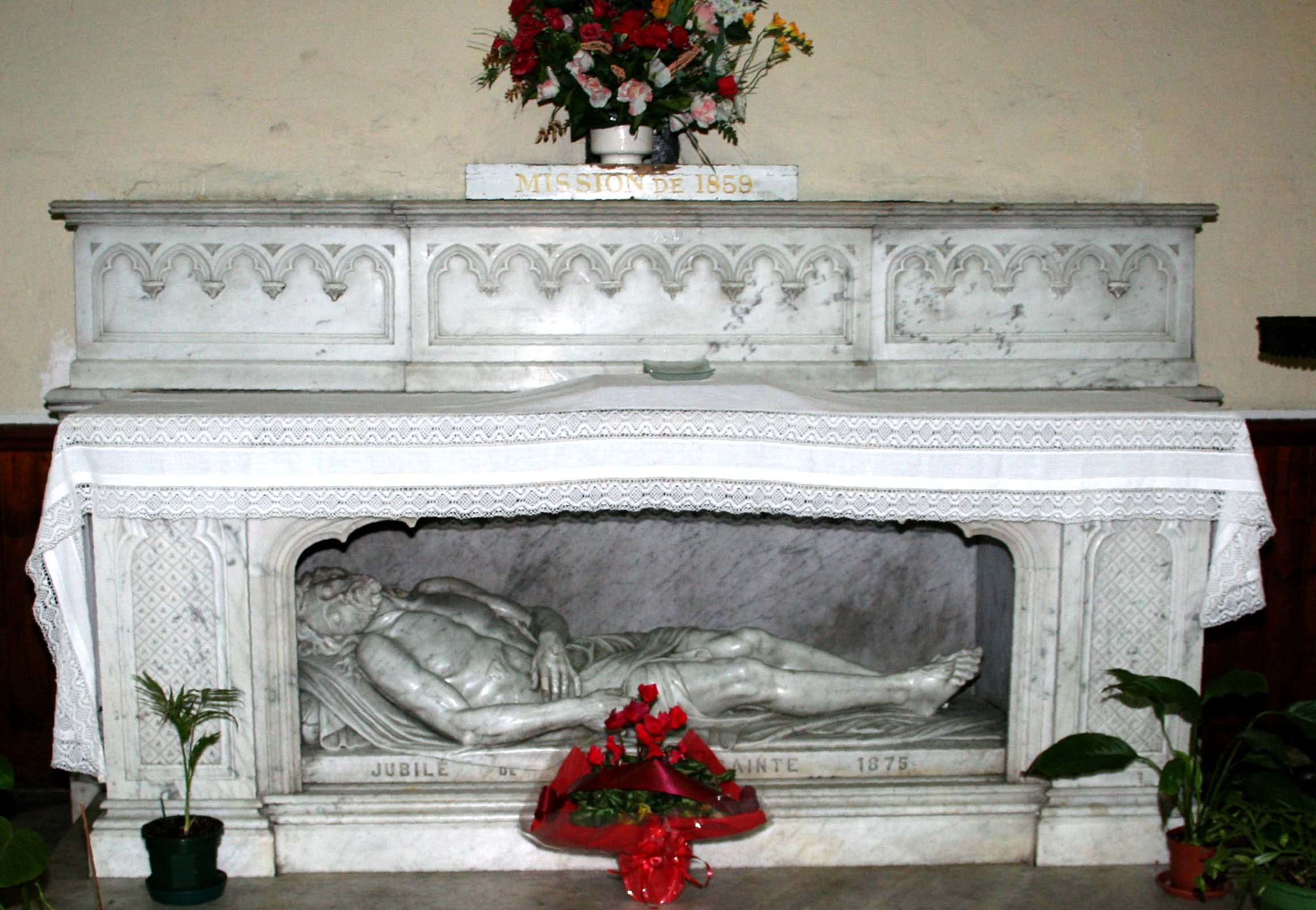
Altar inside the Église Saint-Cannat

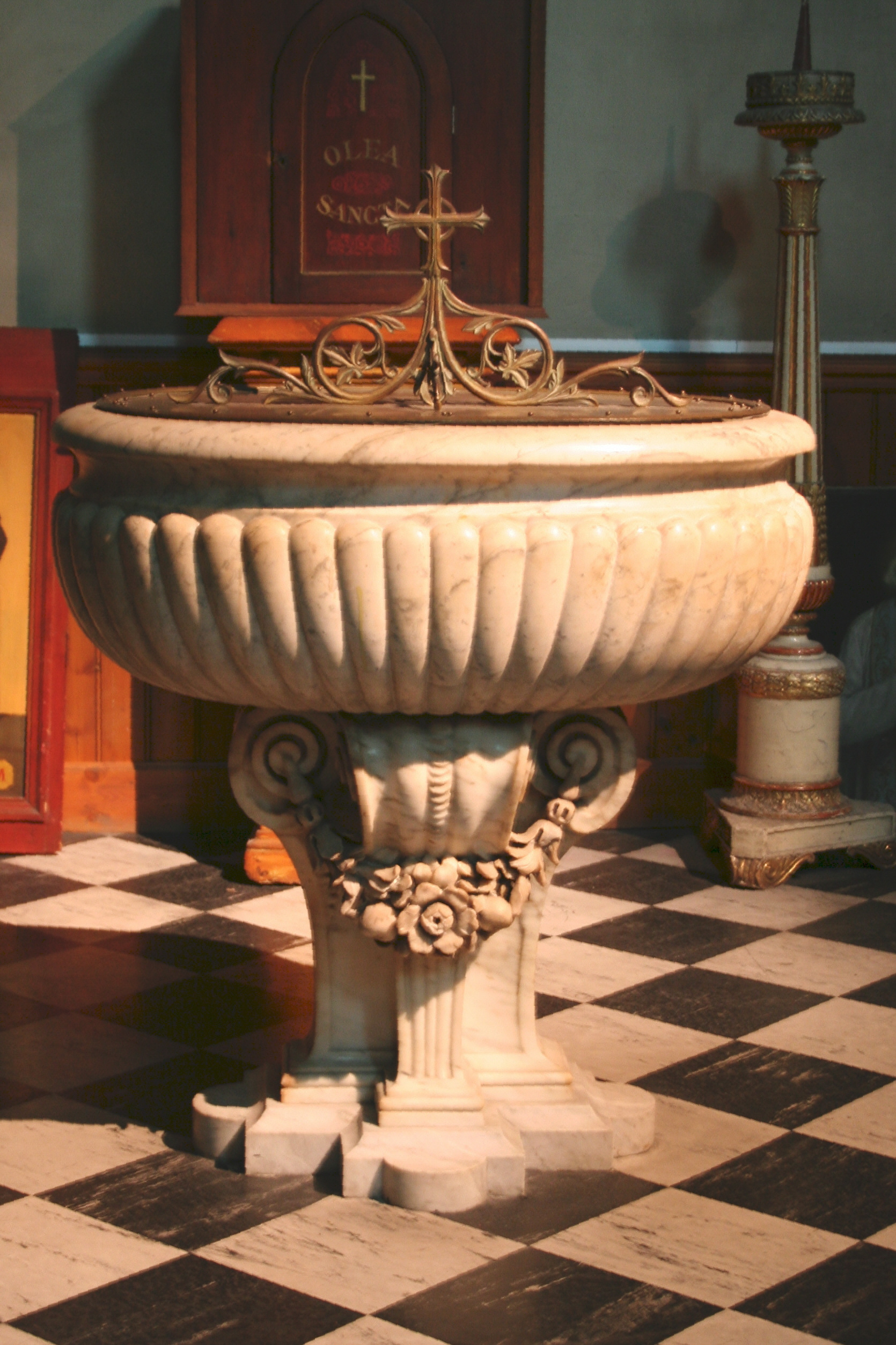
Baptism font inside the Église Saint-Cannat

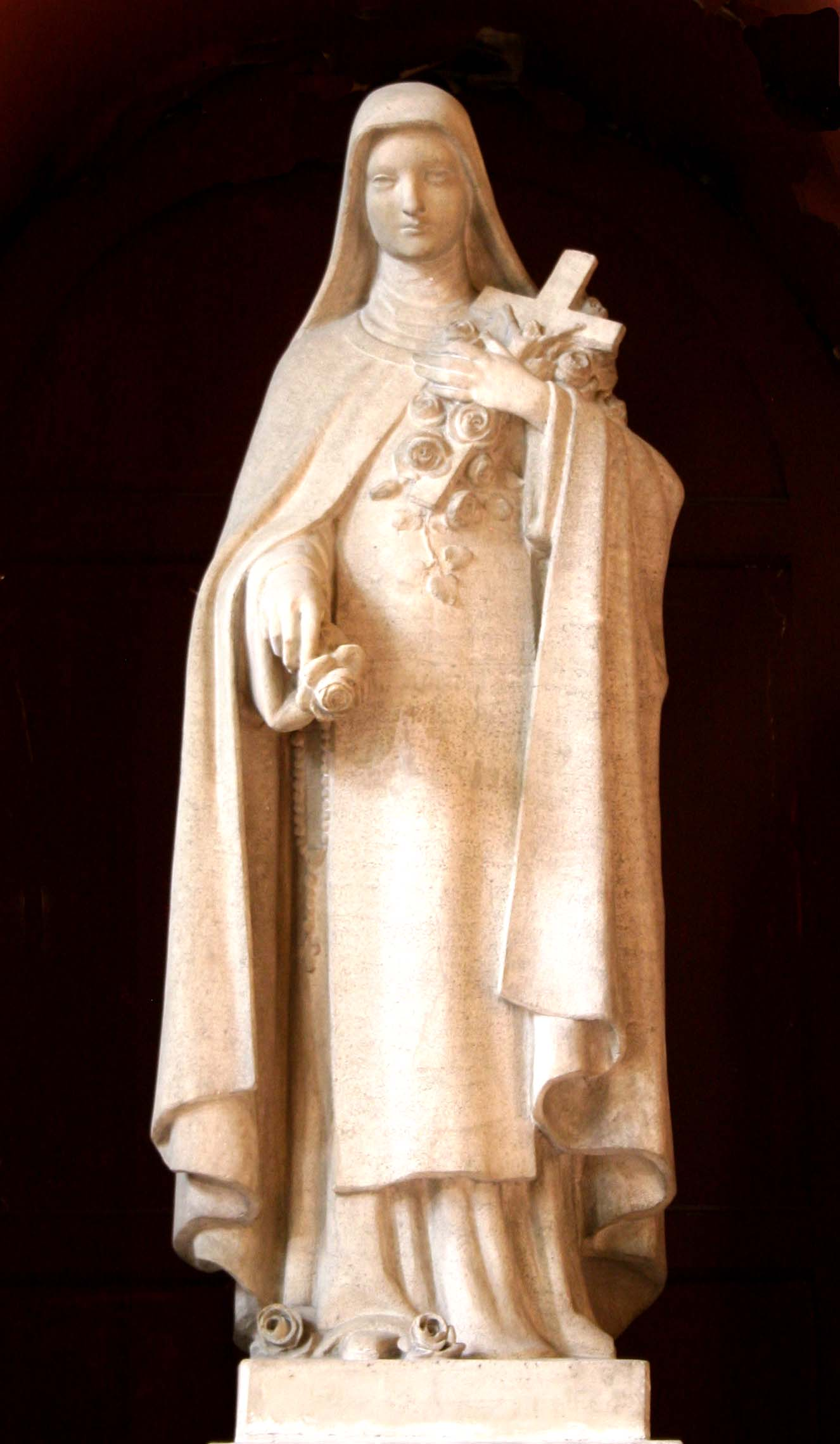
Sculpture of Saint Thérèse of Lisieux designed by François Carli inside the Église Saint-Cannat

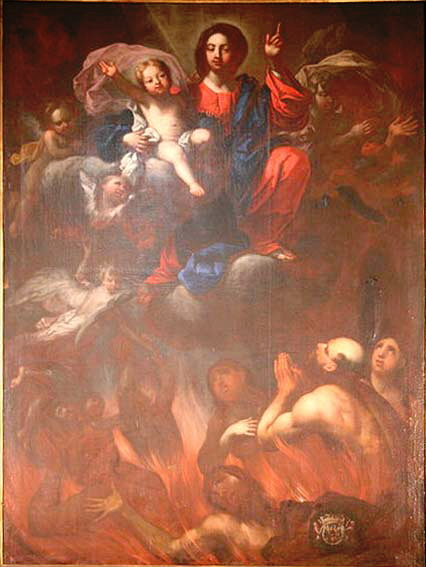
La vierge à l’enfant et le purgatoire by Michel Serre inside the Église Saint-Cannat

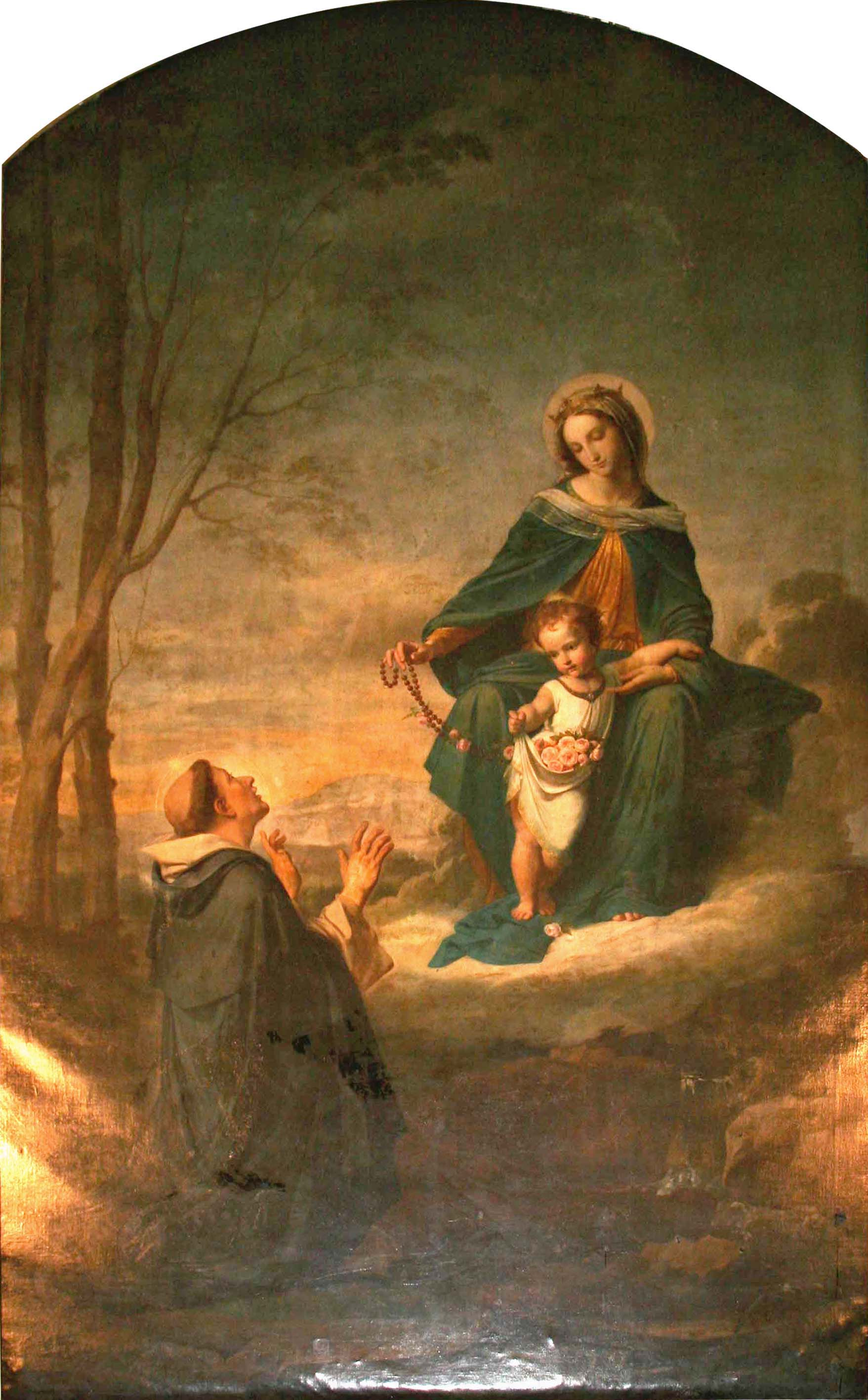
La purification de la Vierge by Michel Serre inside the Église Saint-Cannat
