= Jean-Esprit Isnard =

French organ builder (1707–1781)

- Born: 1707; Bédarrides, Vaucluse, Provence-Alpes-Côte d'Azur, France
- Died: 1781 (aged 73–74); Tarascon, Bouches-du-Rhône, Provence-Alpes-Côte d'Azur, France
- Resting place: Tarascon, Bouches-du-Rhône, Provence-Alpes-Côte d'Azur, France
- Occupation: Pipe organ builder
- Relatives: Joseph Isnard (brother); Jean-Baptiste Isnard (nephew)

Jean-Esprit Isnard (1707–1781) was a French pipe organ builder.

== Biography ==
=== Early life ===
Jean-Esprit Isnard was born in 1707. He was baptised in the Église Saint-Laurent in Bédarrides. He learned how to build pipe organs in Toulouse.

His brother, Joseph Isnard, was also a renowned pipe organ builder, as was his nephew Jean-Baptiste Isnard.

=== Career ===
He became a renowned builder of pipe organs. Many of his pipe organs can be found in Roman Catholic churches in Provence. In 1742, as a lay brother, he restored the pipe organ inside the Église Sainte-Marthe in Tarascon. The following year, in 1743, he built the pipe organ inside the Église de la Madeleine in Aix-en-Provence. He went on to build the pipe organs inside the Cathédrale Saint-Sauveur, also in Aix. In Marseille, he built the organ inside the Église Saint-Cannat in 1747. In, together with his brother Joseph Isnard, he built the pipe organ inside the Basilique Sainte-Marie-Madeleine in Saint-Maximin-la-Sainte-Baume from 1772 to 1774.

Additionally, he taught Jean-Pierre Cavaillé, the father of Dominique Cavaillé-Coll and grandfather of Aristide Cavaillé-Coll (1811-1899), how to build pipe organs.

=== Death ===
He died in 1781 in Tarascon, where he is buried.

== Gallery ==
Jean-Esprit Isnard
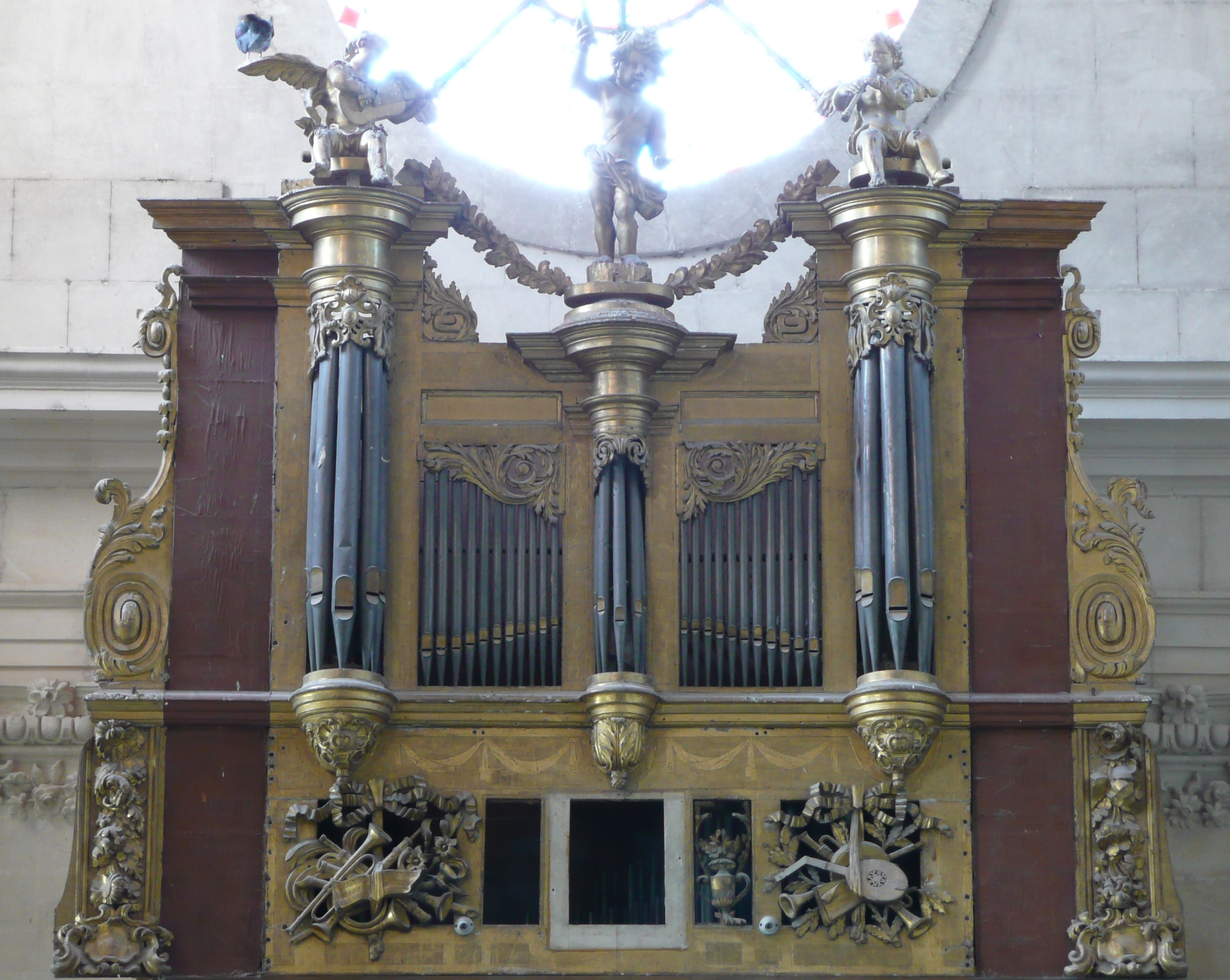
Organ in the Église Sainte-Marthe in Tarascon

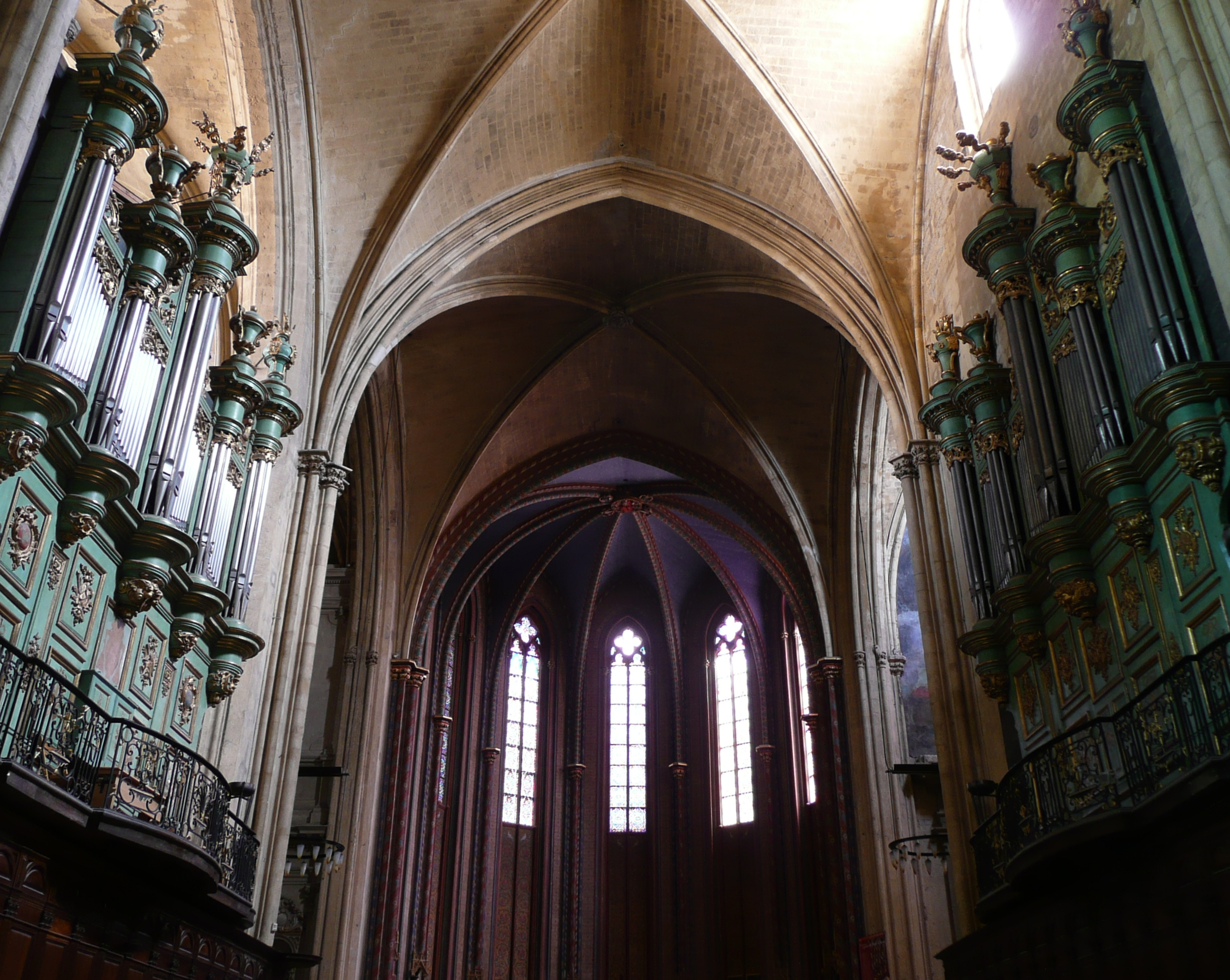
Organ in the Cathédrale Saint-Sauveur in Aix-en-Provence

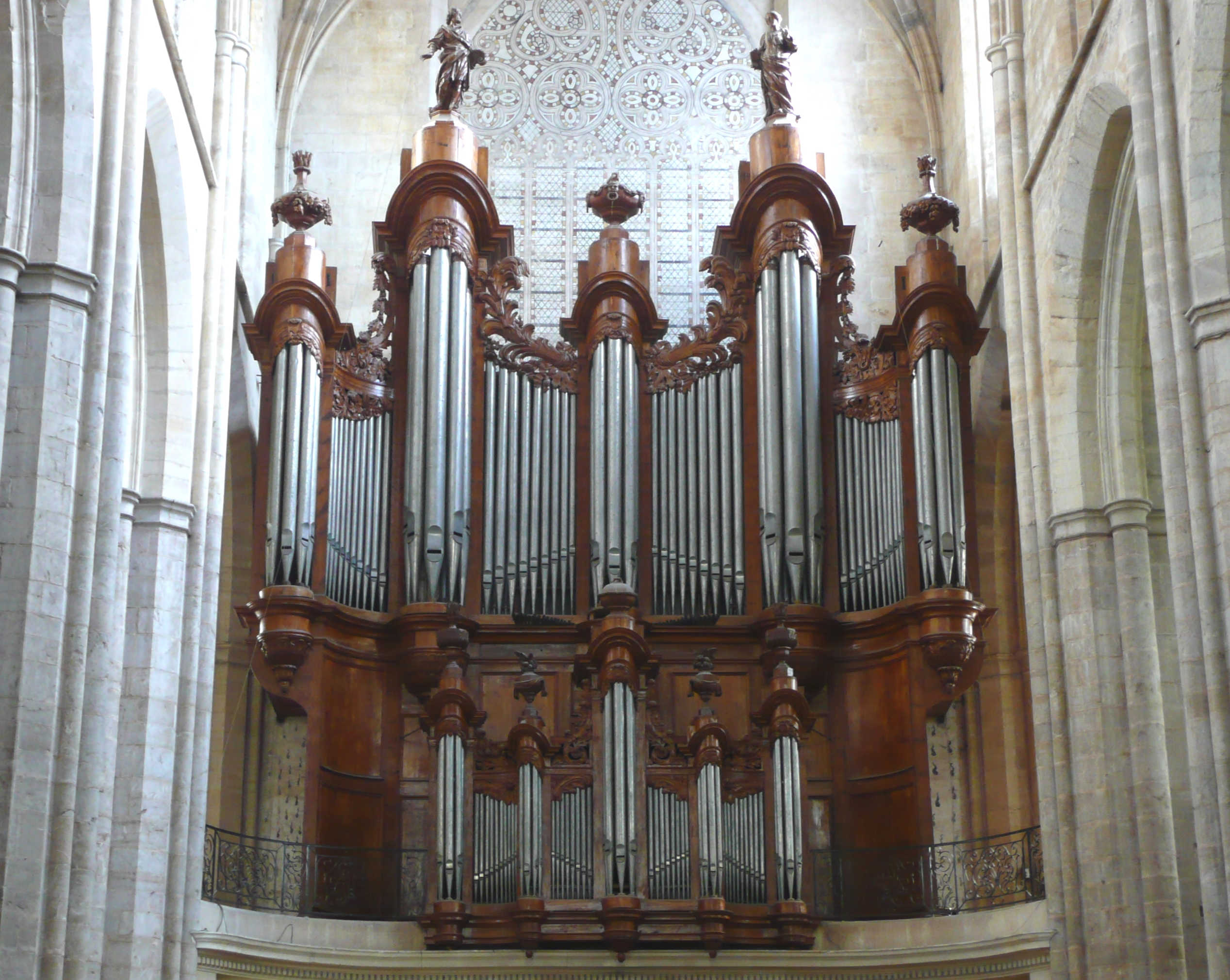
Organ in the Basilique Sainte-Marie-Madeleine in Saint-Maximin-la-Sainte-Baume

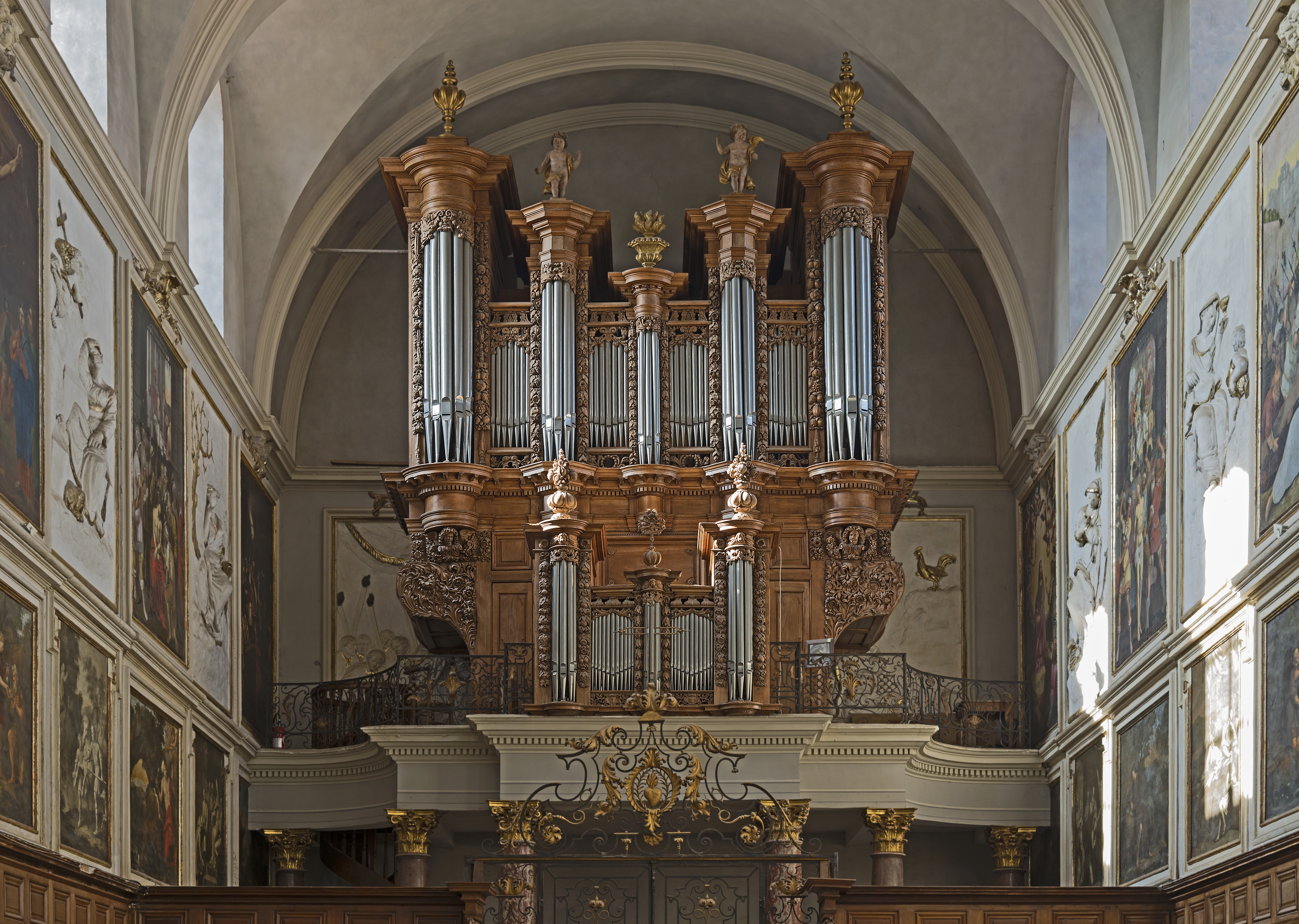
Organ in Saint-Pierre des Chartreux in Toulouse
