= Paul Gondard =

French sculptor (1884–1953)

- Born: 7 September 1884; Marseille, Bouches-du-Rhône, France
- Died: 27 February 1953 (aged 68); Marseille, Bouches-du-Rhône, France
- Occupation: Sculptor
- Relatives: François Carli (brother-in-law)

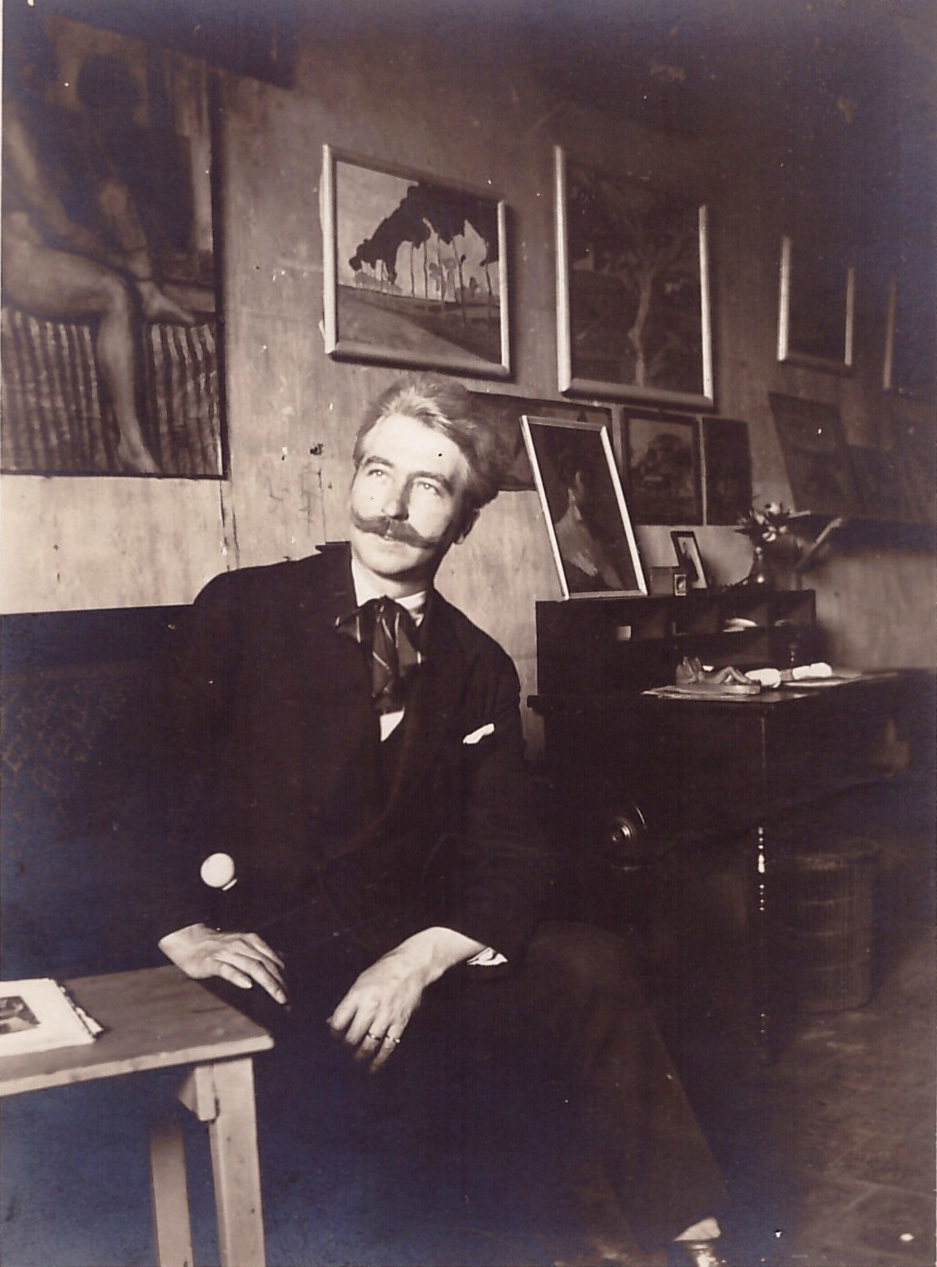
Gondard in 1922.

Paul Gondard (1884–1953) was a French sculptor.

== Biography ==
Gondard studied at the École des Beaux-Arts in Marseille but did not pursue further studies in Paris as was usual with provincial sculptors at that time, choosing instead to remain in the Bouches du Rhône region and practise there. He exhibited regularly at the Salon de l’Union des Artistes in Provence from 1919 to 1948. He also exhibited his work at the 1922 Éxposition Coloniale and the 1935 Éxposition catholique, both held in Marseille. His work in Marseille and his contribution to helping to make Marseiile an artistic centre resulted in him being elected to the Académie de Marseille on 4 May 1950.

== Main works ==
1. Imbert medallion. Gondard executed a medallion celebrating the life of Leon Imbert.

2. The La Fare-les-Oliviers war memorial. This memorial was erected in 1920 and covers the dead of the 1870, 1914-1918 and 1939-1945 wars and the conflicts in Algeria, Morocco and Tunisia. On the west face of the memorial is Gondard's statue of a veiled woman who holds a broad sword and on the north and south faces are verses in the language of Provence by Victorin Lavison dedicated to those lost in the 1914-1918 war.

3. The monument to the composer Ernest Reyer. In Gondard's 1934 marble composition Reyer sits meditating in an armchair. The right side arm of the chair carries the portrait of a woman based on the character Salammbõ, a Reyer opera based on the novel by Gustave Flaubert and on the left side arm there is a portrait of Sigurd. Both Salambõ and Sigurd were characters from Reyer operas. The statue was installed in front of the Marseille's Opera House in 1934 and subsequently relocated in the grounds of the Palais Longchamp (Parc Longchamp)in Marseille.

4. Émile Ripert. Gondard's bust of this Provence poet and writer Émile Ripert can be seen in a public garden in La Ciotat. Gondard executed this work in 1949.

5. Monument aux morts (War memorial) known as "Monument de l'Ange guardien". Gondard was the sculptor of the war memorial in Château-Ville-Vieille. The octagonal pyramid shaped memorial, made from stone from a local quarry, lists the dead both of Château-Ville-Vieille and the neighbouring villages of Arvieux, Aiguilles, Ristolas, Saint-Véran and Molines; the seven communes of the Aiguilles canton. Central to the memorial is Gondard's sculpture of a standing Gallic warrior, naked and muscular, whose arms are crossed over the hilt of a large broadsword. Gondard received the commission in 1924. At the foot of the warrior are inscribed the words in Latin "PAX GALLIAE". A total of 210 men are listed.

6. Le Voix de la Mer. The 1928 composition in marble "Le Voix de la Mer", adorns a tomb in the Marseille Saint-Pierre cemetery. Gondard's composition is also known as "Les Deux Doulers". The two women depicted appear to have risen from the sea.

7. Statue of Alfred Vivien. This work can be seen in Bandol

8. Bouisson. The 1935 study of the mayor Bouisson in La Ciotat

9. Mozart. A bust of Mozart dating to 1936 and held by the Musée des Beaux-Arts in Marseille. This marble bust was acquired by the Marseille Musée des beaux-arts in 1936 The museum also hold a Gondard "Tete d'Enfant" acquired in 1933.

10. Monument to François Fabié. In the Jardin Alexandre 1er de Yougoslavie in Toulon is a Gondard sculpture, dating to 1935, dedicated to the poet and academic

11. Monument to Edmond Rostand. The 1930 monument in Marseille to the poet Edmond Rostand

Paul Gondard was born on 7 September 1884 in Marseille, Bouches-du-Rhône, France.

== Note ==
After the end of the 1914-1918 war, a Franco-Italian committee was formed in Marseille to organise the erection of a monument dedicated to those Italian soldiers who had given their lives for France. Gondard produced a maquette and in May 1923 a subscription fund was set up. The amount raised was insufficient to cover the costs and the monument was never erected.

== Death ==
He died on 27 February 1953 in Marseille. and was buried in the Cemetery Saint-Pierre in Marseille.
