= Canus Natus =

Gallo-Roman Roman Catholic saint

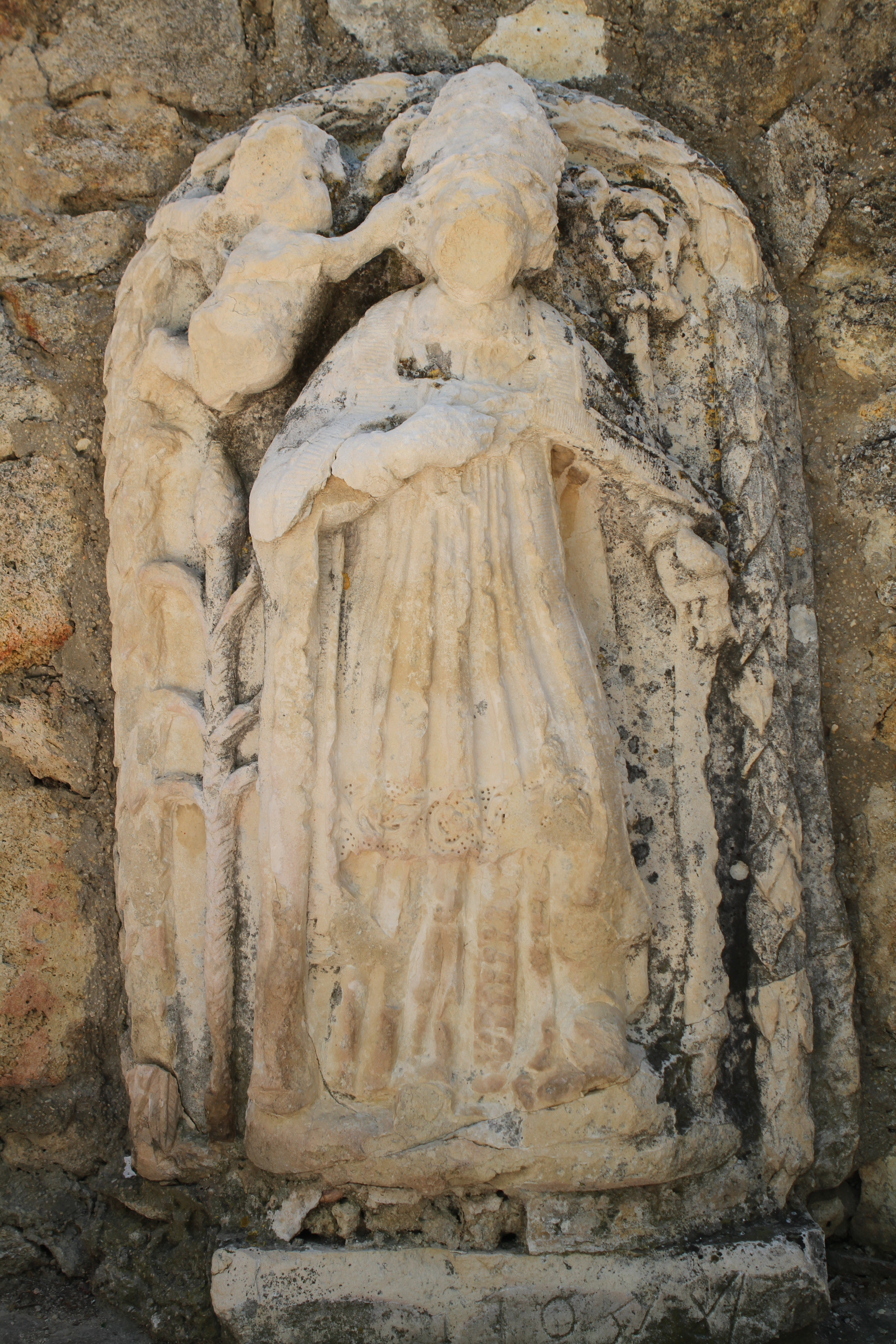
- Statue in Saint-Cannat

Pilgrim
- Born: Fifth century
- Died: October 15, 490; Saint-Cannat, France

Canus Natus was a Gallo-Roman saint in the fifth century.

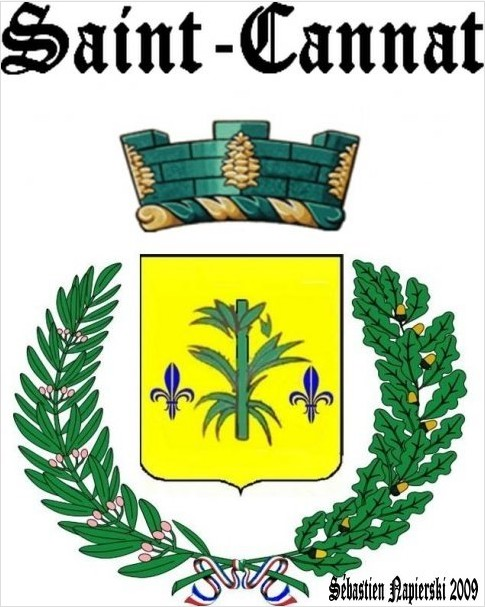
Escutcheon of the village of Saint-Cannat.

== Early life ==
Canus Natus was born in the fifth century. He was white-haired upon his birth, a sign of wisdom at the time. The phrase "canus natus" in Latin means "he was born old."

== Religious vocation ==
He became a hermit in a place called Sauzet, described by Christophe de Villeneuve-Bargemon (1771–1829) as a "desert" with "willow trees."

According to Henri François Xavier de Belsunce de Castelmoron (1671–1755), one of his miracles occurred when a dead reed he used as a cane was brought back to life, looking green again. This miracle led him to accept a tenure as the Bishop of Marseille in the second half of the fifth century. During his tenure, he strongly opposed paganism and heresy.

== Death and legacy ==
Upon retirement, he settled in Sauzet again, and died there on October 15, 490. After he was buried there, it became a hamlet and took his name. It is now known as the village of Saint-Cannat. Additionally, the Église Saint-Cannat in Marseille, built from 1526 to 1619, is named in his honour.

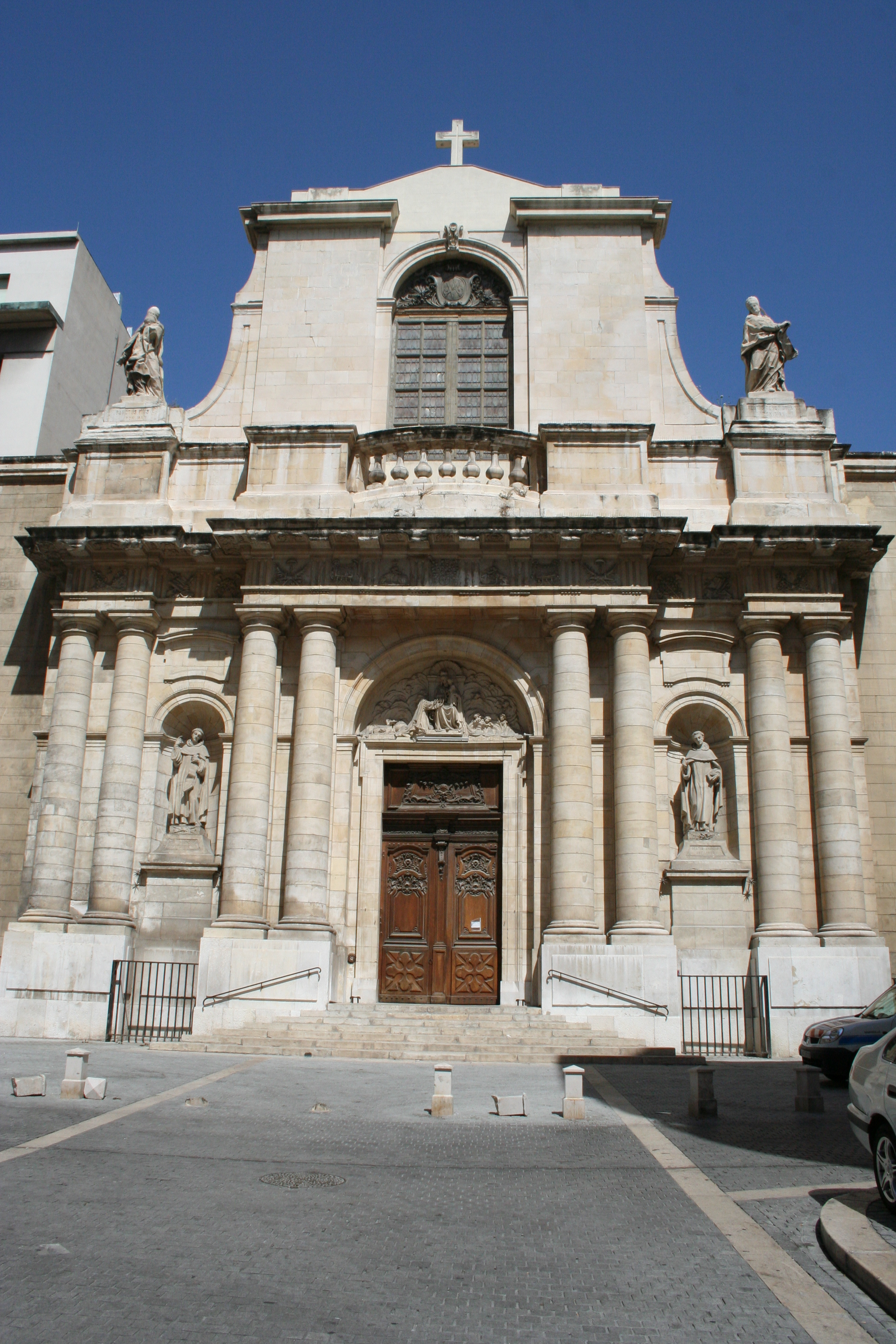
Église Saint-Cannat in Marseille.
