= Auguste Carli =

French sculptor

- Born: 12 July 1868; Marseille, Bouches-du-Rhône, France
- Died: 28 January 1930 (aged 61); Paris, France
- Occupation: Sculptor
- Relatives: François Carli (brother)

Auguste Carli (12 July 1868 – 28 January 1930) was a French sculptor.

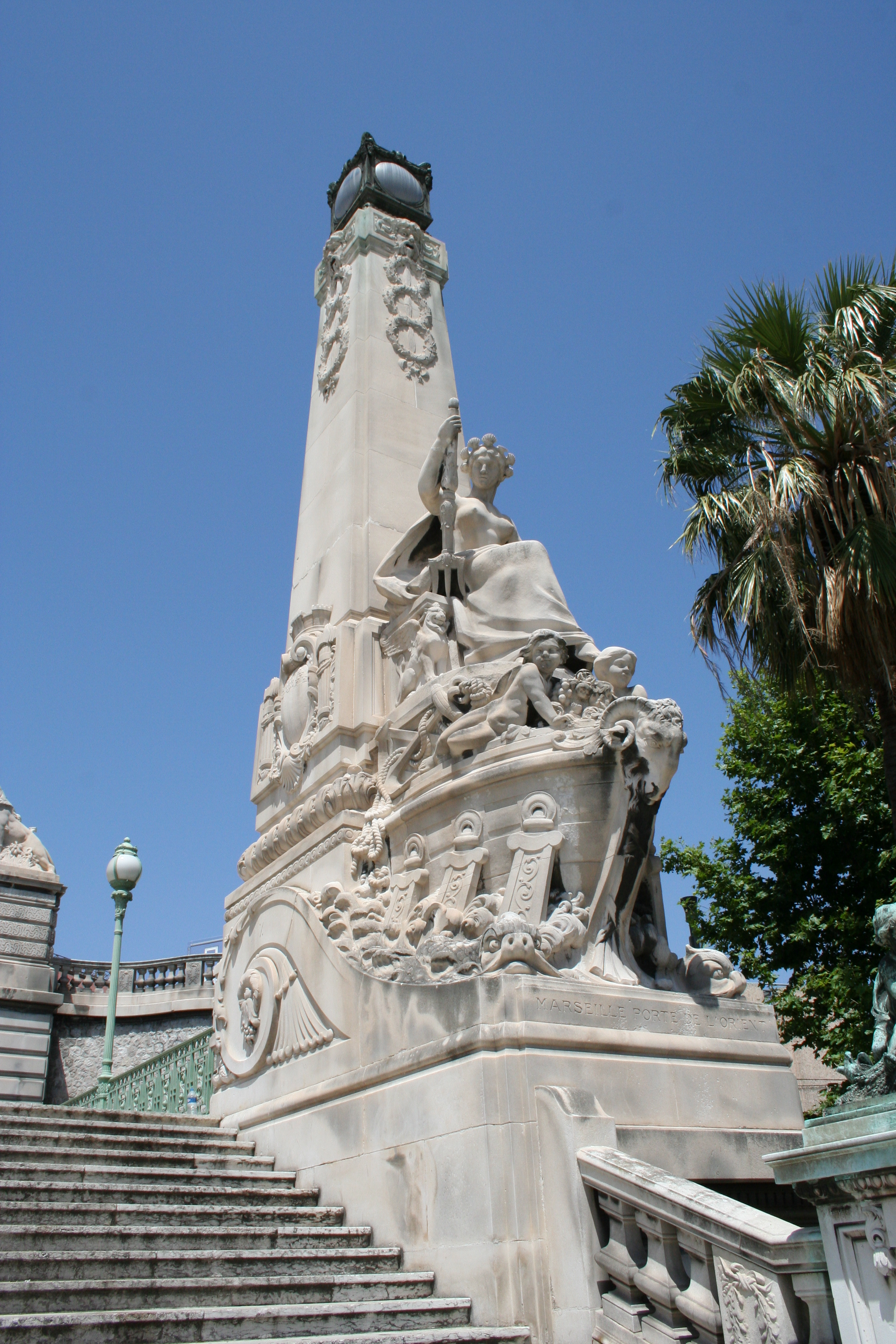
'Marseille Porte de l'Orient' by Auguste Carli along the main staircase of the Gare Saint-Charles

== Biography ==
=== Early life ===
Auguste Carli was born on 12 July 1868 in Marseille, Bouches-du-Rhône, France. His younger brother, François Carli (1872-1957), was also a sculptor.

=== Career ===
He was a sculptor.

He designed two statues on either side of the main staircase of the Gare de Marseille-Saint-Charles: one, called 'Marseille colonie grecque' ("Marseille, Greek colony") and the other one, called 'Marseille Porte de l'Orient' ("Marseille, door to the East"). Additionally, he designed a sculpture on the building of the Caisse d'Épargne on the corner of Cours Pierre Puget and Place Estrangin in Marseille. He also designed a fountain with a sculpture of Amphitrite on the Place Joseph Etienne for Joseph Hippolyte Etienne (1790-1881), which was dedicated in 1906.

He designed a statue of Jesus Christ and Saint Veronica, which is displayed inside the Marseille Cathedral.

He also designed the tomb of Adolphe Joseph Thomas Monticelli (1824-1886) in the Palais Longchamp Marseille. Additionally, he designed sculptures in the Cimetière Saint-Pierre, a cemetery in Marseille.

=== Death ===
He died on 28 January 1930 in Paris.

=== Legacy ===
- The Place Auguste et François Carli, a town square in Marseille, is named for him and his brother.

== See also ==
List of works by Auguste Carli

== Gallery ==
Auguste Carli
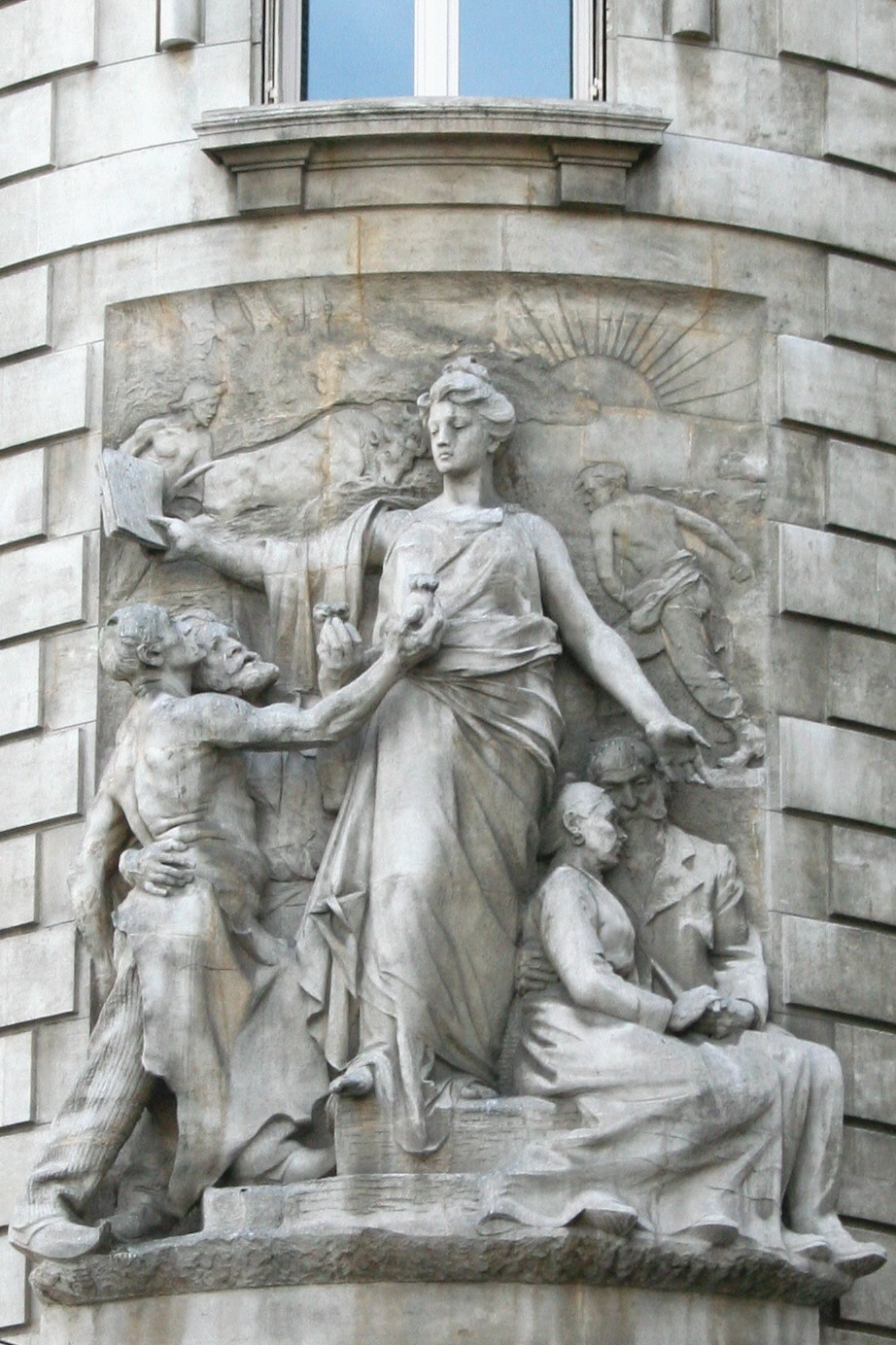
Sculpture by Auguste Carli on the Caisse d'Épargne building in Marseille

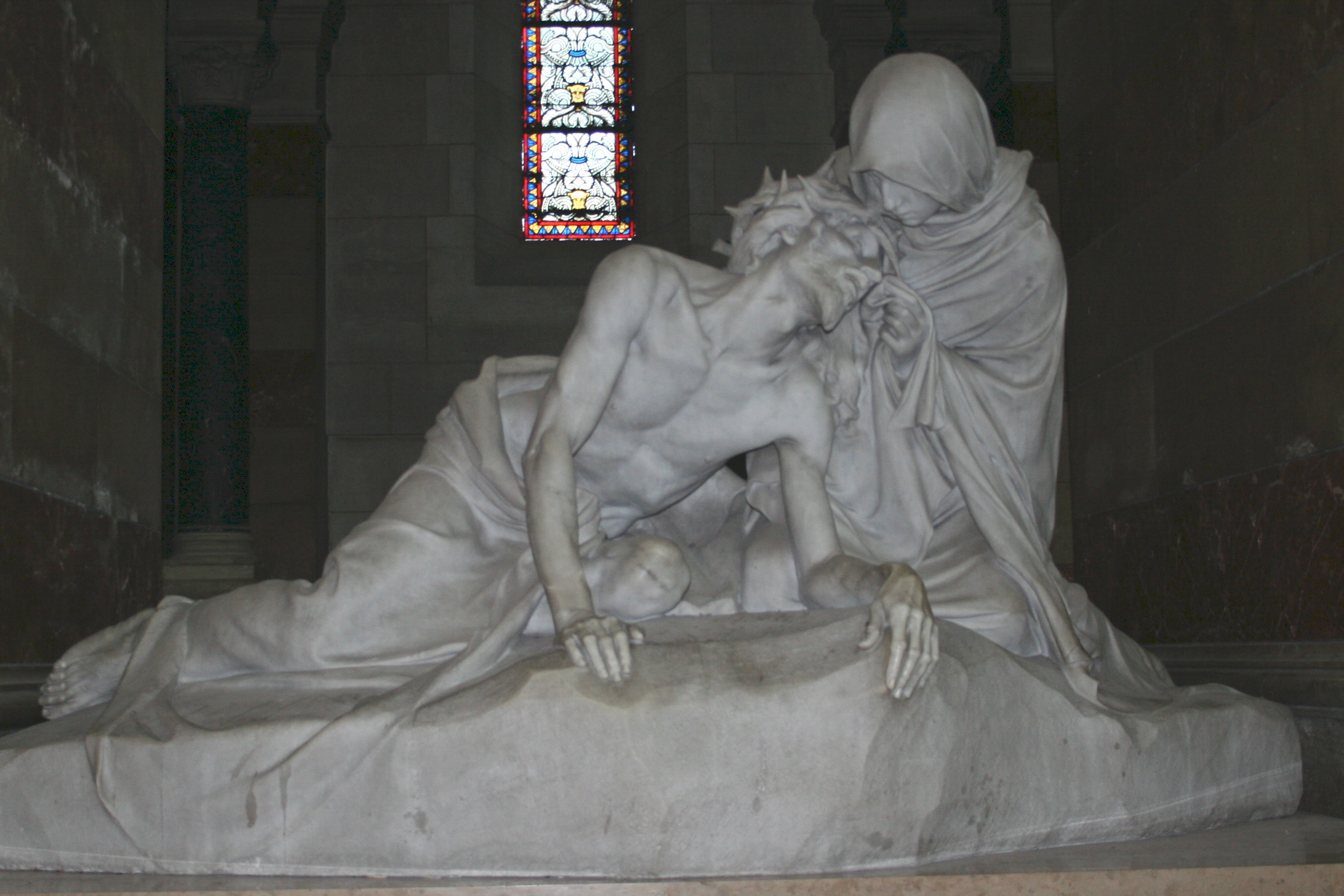
'Christ and Saint Veronica' by Auguste Carli inside the Marseille Cathedral

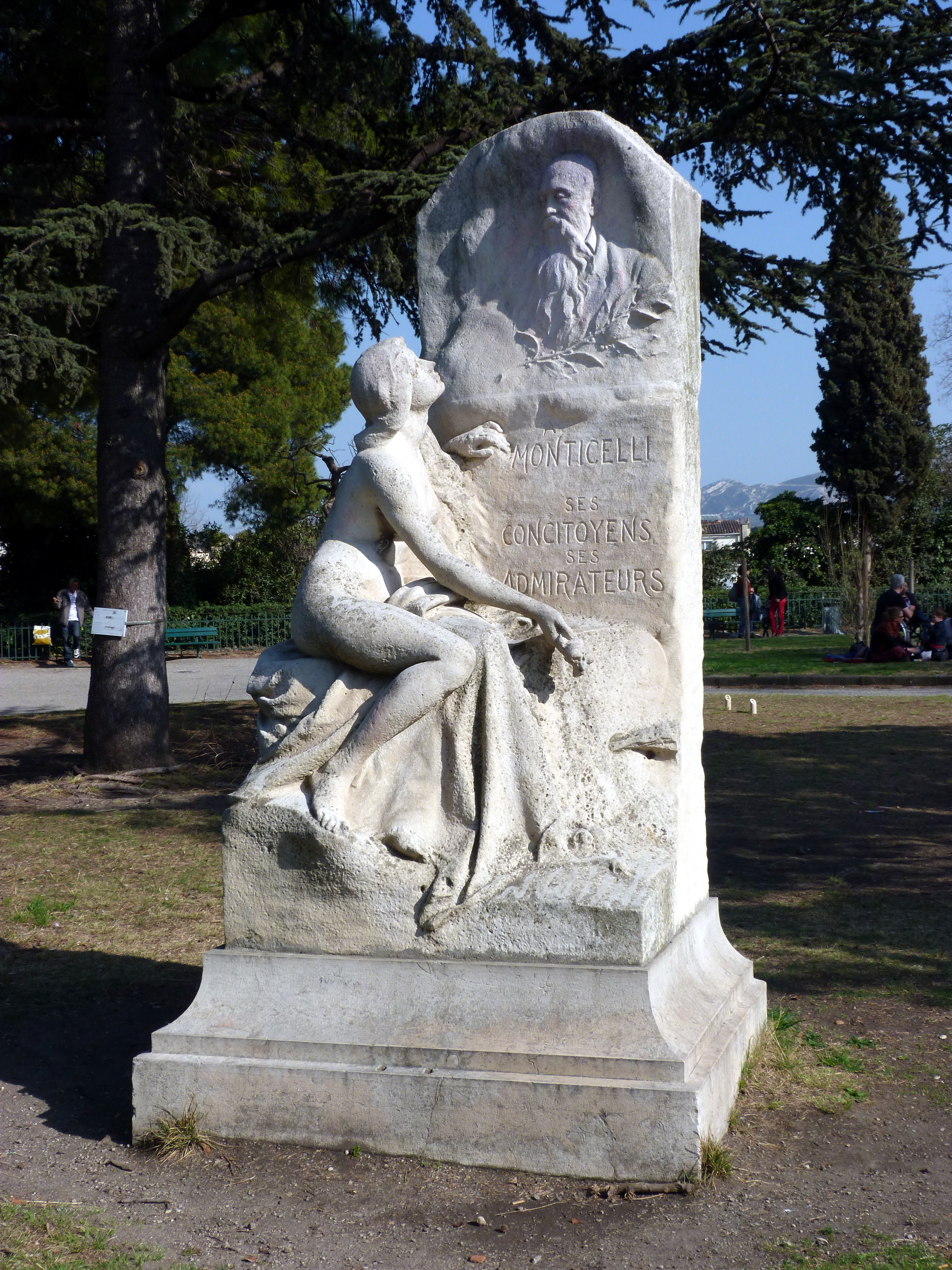
Tomb of Adolphe Joseph Thomas Monticelli designed by Auguste Carli in Marseille

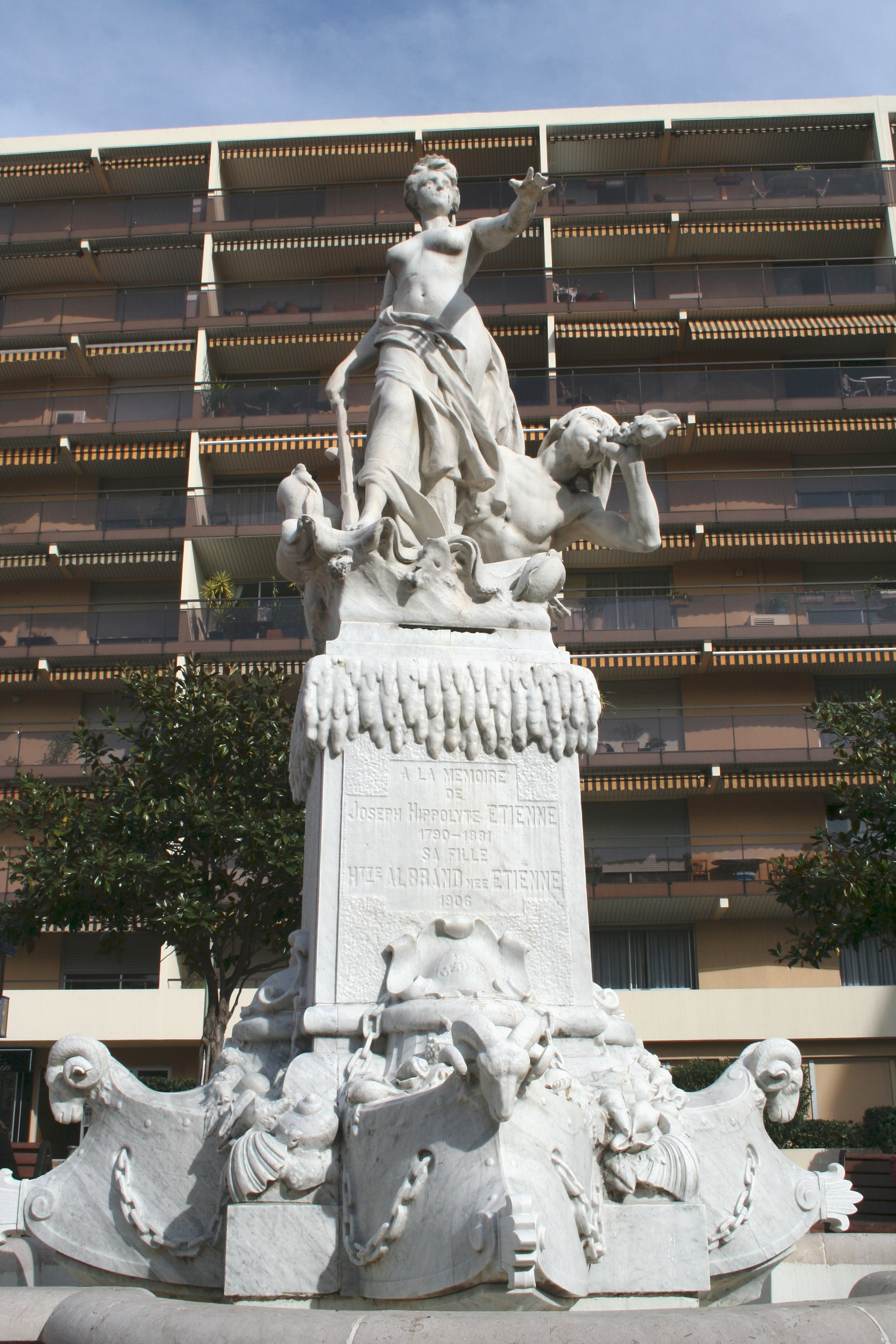
Fountain with a sculpture of Amphitrite on Place Joseph Etienne in Marseille

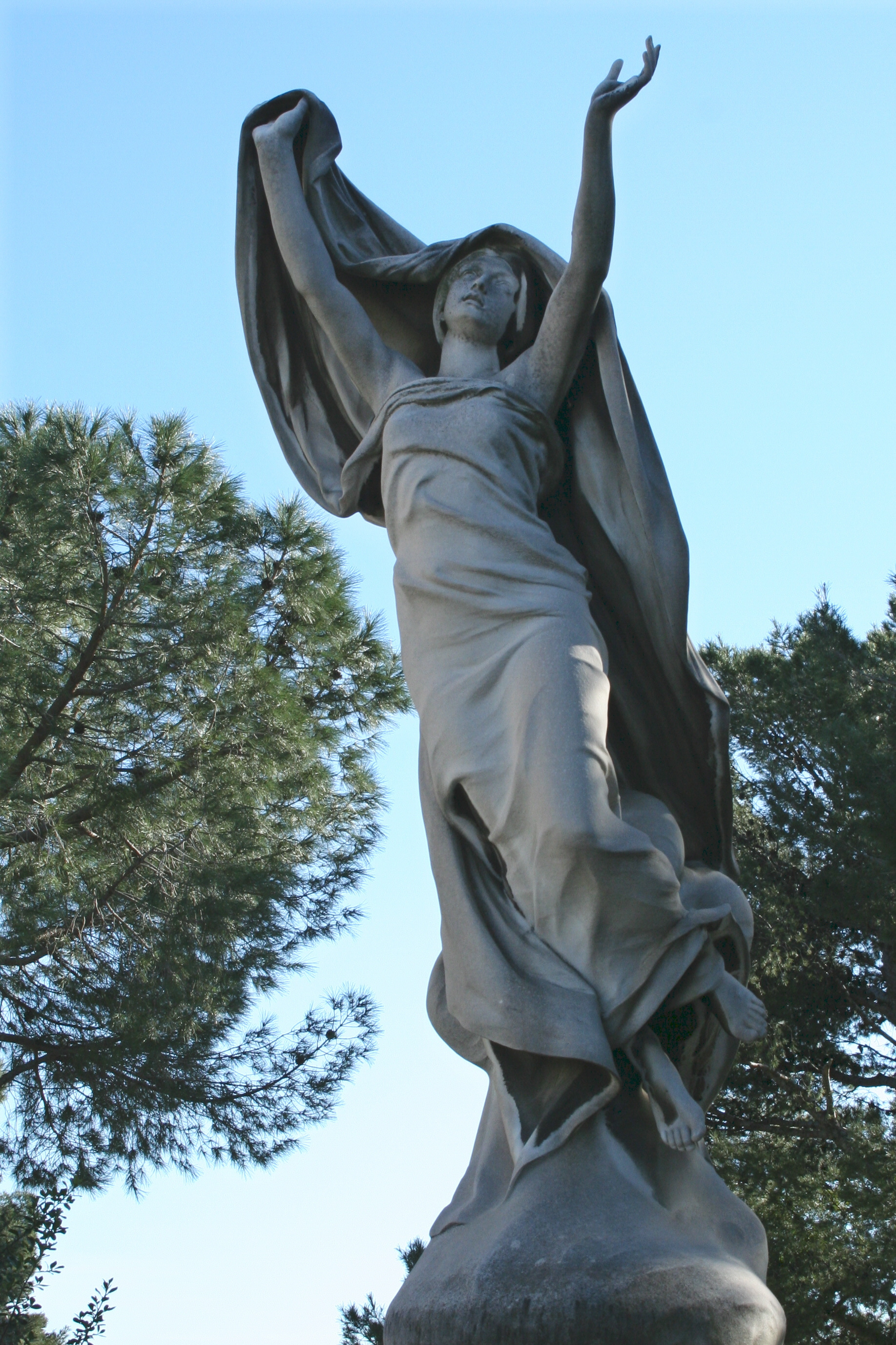
Statue designed by Auguste Carli in the Cimetière Saint-Pierre in Marseille

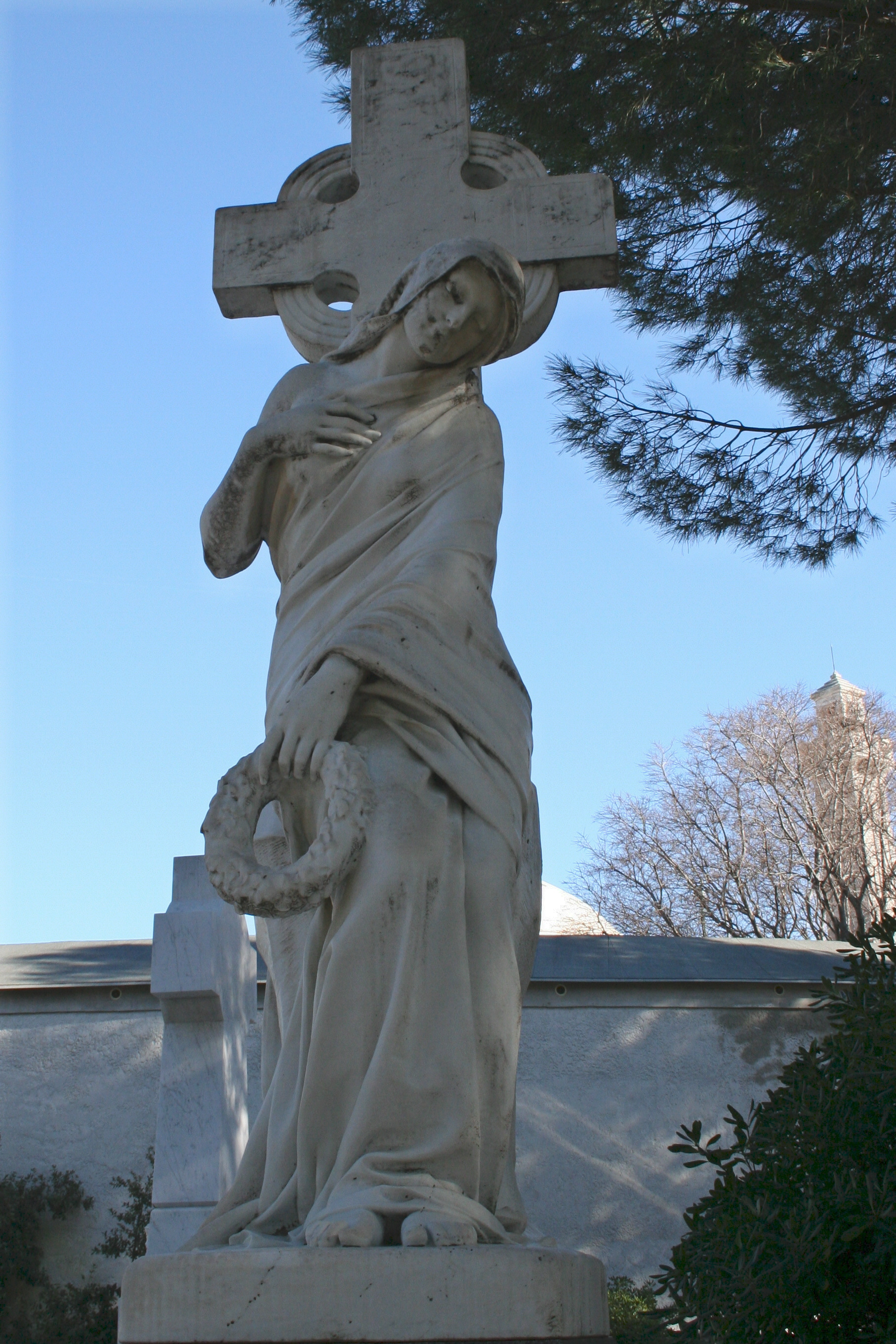
Another statue designed by Auguste Carli in the Cimetière Saint-Pierre in Marseille
