= Adolphe Monticelli =

French painter (1824–1886)

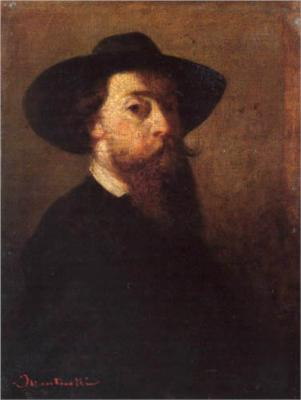
- Adolphe Monticelli, Self-portrait
- Born: Adolphe Joseph Thomas Monticelli; 14 October 1824; Marseille, France
- Died: 29 June 1886 (aged 61); Marseille, France
- Education: École Municipale de Dessin, Marseille (1842-1846); École des Beaux-Arts, Paris
- Movement: Orientalist; Romanticism

Adolphe Joseph Thomas Monticelli (14 October 1824 – 29 June 1886) was a French painter of the generation preceding the Impressionists.

== Biography ==
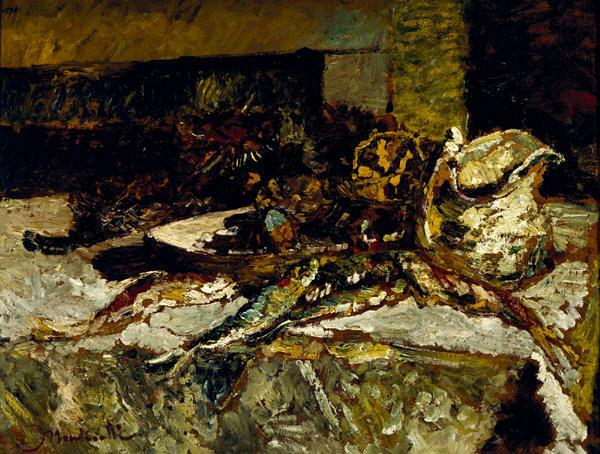
Still life with Sardines and Sea Urchins, 1880–1882, Dallas Museum of Art

Monticelli was born in Marseille in humble circumstances. He attended the École Municipale de Dessin in Marseille from 1842 to 1846 and continued his artistic training in Paris, where he studied under Paul Delaroche at the École des Beaux-Arts. In Paris, he made copies after the Old Masters in the Louvre and admired the oil sketches of Eugène Delacroix. In 1855 he met Narcisse Diaz, a member of the Barbizon school, and the two often painted together in the Fontainebleau Forest. Monticelli frequently adopted Diaz's practice of introducing nudes or elegantly costumed figures into his landscapes.

Monticelli developed a highly individual Romantic style of painting in which richly colored, dappled, textured and glazed surfaces produce a scintillating effect. He painted courtly subjects inspired by Antoine Watteau; he also painted still lifes, portraits, and Orientalist subjects that owe much to the example of Delacroix.

After 1870, Monticelli returned to Marseille, where he lived in poverty despite a prolific output, selling his paintings for small sums. An unworldly man, he dedicated himself single-mindedly to his art.

The young Paul Cézanne befriended Monticelli in the 1860s, and the influence of the older painter's work can be seen in Cézanne's work of that decade. Between 1878 and 1884, the two artists often painted landscapes together, once spending a month roaming the Aix countryside. Although Monticelli experimented briefly around 1870 with a treatment of light reflecting the discoveries of the Impressionists, he found the objectivity of this approach uncongenial.

Confronted with criticism of his style of painting, Monticelli himself remarked, "I paint for thirty years from now". His work reached its greatest spontaneity in the decade before his death in 1886.

== Legacy ==
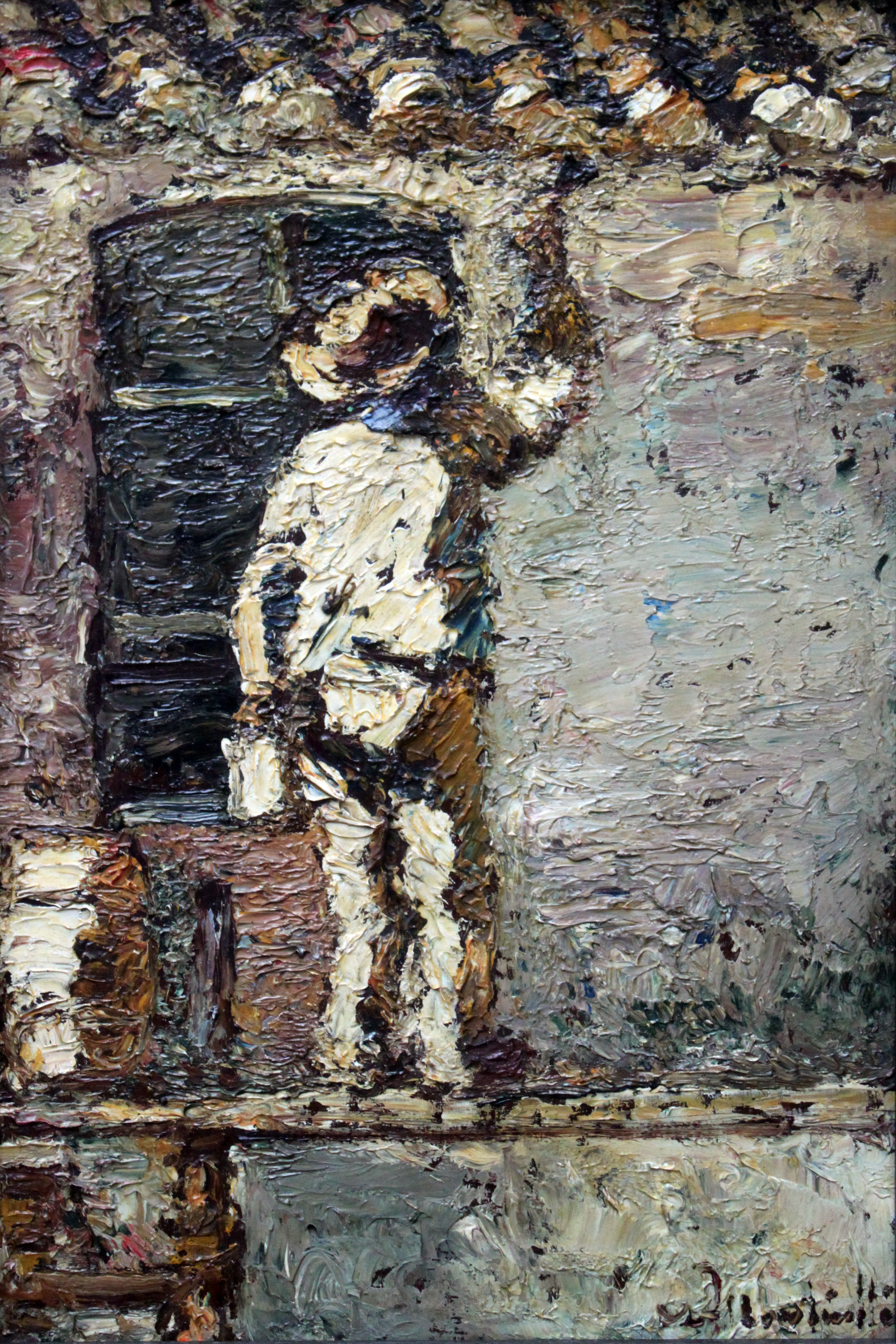
A Painter at Work on a House Wall, 1875, Städel

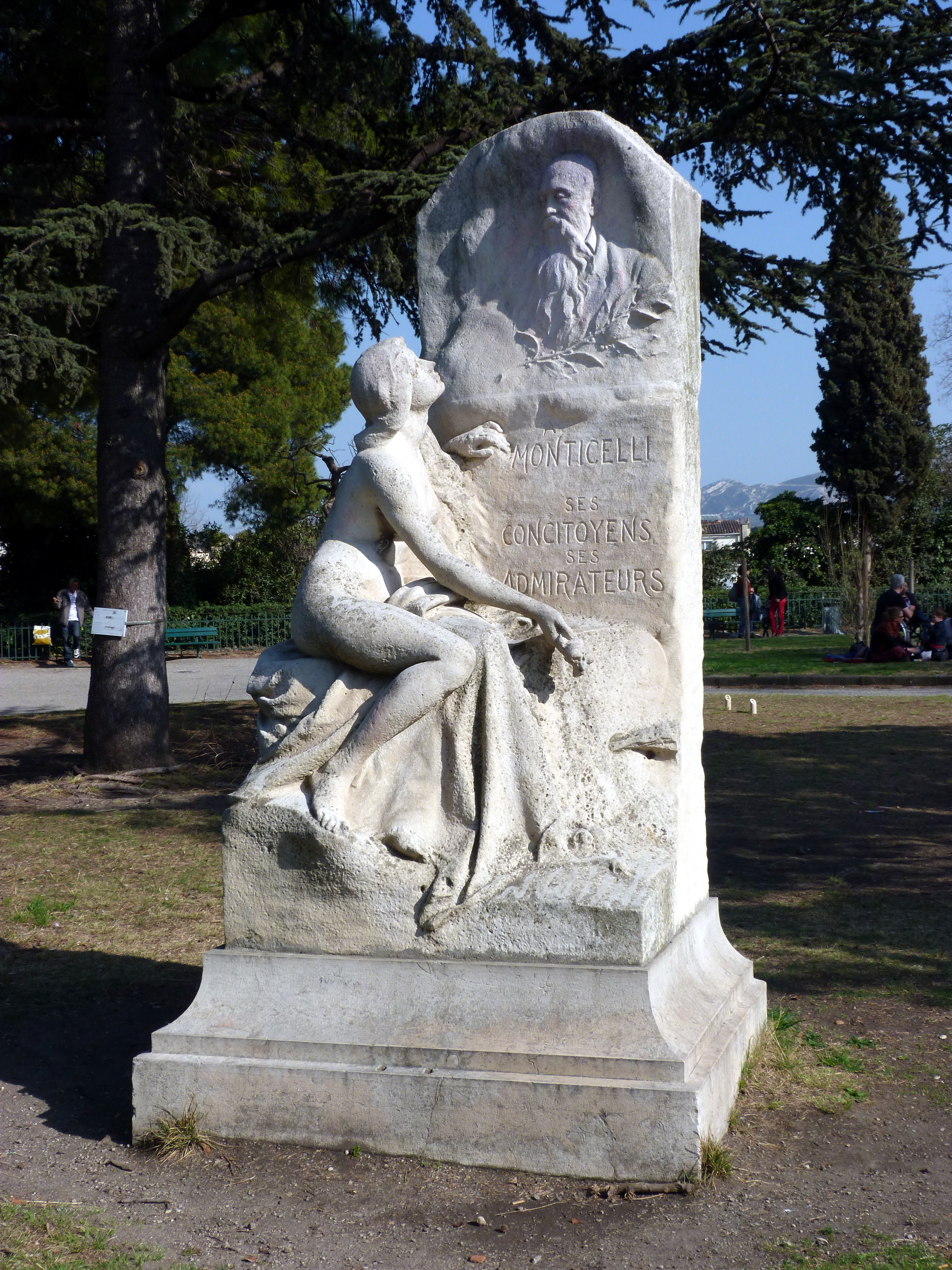
Monument à Monticelli in the Palais Longchamp Marseille

More than a century after his death, Monticelli's art is still subject to controversy.

In its painterly freedom, Monticelli's work prefigures that of Vincent van Gogh, who greatly admired his work after seeing it in Paris when he arrived there in 1886. Van Gogh immediately adopted a brighter palette and a bolder attack, and later remarked, "I sometimes think I am really continuing that man." In 1890, Van Gogh and his brother Theo were instrumental in publishing the first book about Monticelli.

Monticelli's reputation grew after his death. Among his collectors was Oscar Wilde who, after going to prison in 1895, wrote of his bankruptcy in a letter to Lord Alfred Douglas, "De Profundis": "That all my charming things were to be sold: my Burne-Jones drawings: my Whistler drawings: my Monticelli: my Simeon Solomons: my china: my Library..."

Others have expressed disdain for Monticelli's work. In a statement published in 2005 in The Guardian, Sir Timothy Clifford, director general of the National Galleries of Scotland, Edinburgh, even chose Monticelli's A Garden Fete as the worst painting in Britain, and commented, "We have been bequested eight paintings by Monticelli, each one more hideous than the last. In my 21 years here, none has been hung because I think Monticelli produces screamingly awful art. I call this one a Fete Worse Than Death."

A monument honouring Monticelli, designed in 1909 by the sculptor Auguste Carli, is installed in the Palais Longchamp, Marseille.

== Exhibitions ==
From September 2008 until January 2009, an exhibition entitled "Van Gogh and Monticelli" took place in Marseille's Centre de la Vieille Charité, highlighting Monticelli's influence on Van Gogh's work.

From 25 April until 27 September 2015, an exhibition entitled "Van Gogh and Co. Criss-crossing the collection" at the Kröller-Müller Museum in Otterlo, The Netherlands, displayed paintings by Van Gogh and his predecessors, contemporaries and followers, among them François Bonvin, Charley Toorop, Henri Fantin-Latour, Jean-Baptiste Corot, Paul Cézanne, Bart van der Leck and Adolphe Monticelli.

== Gallery ==
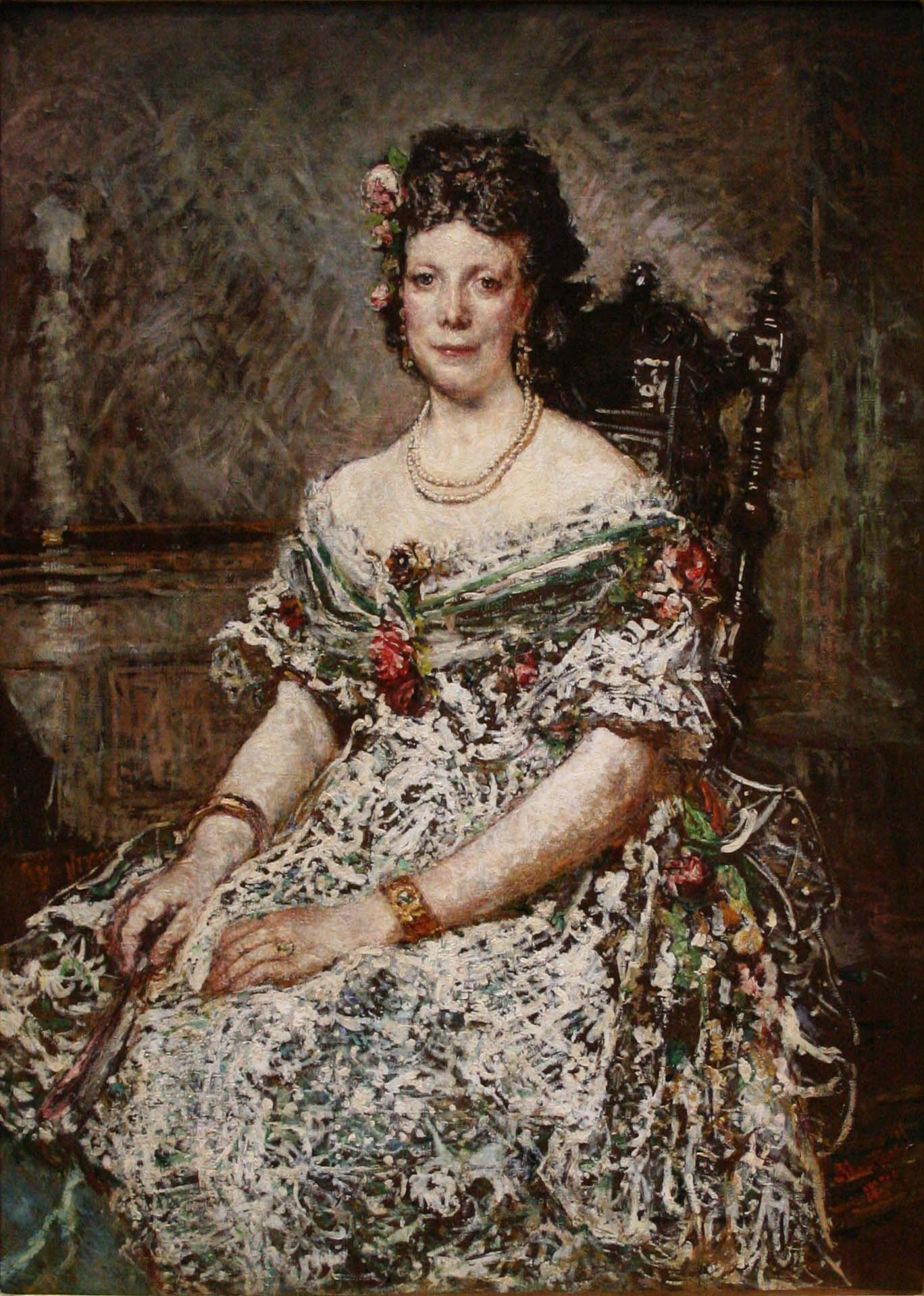
Portrait de Madame Pascal, 1871

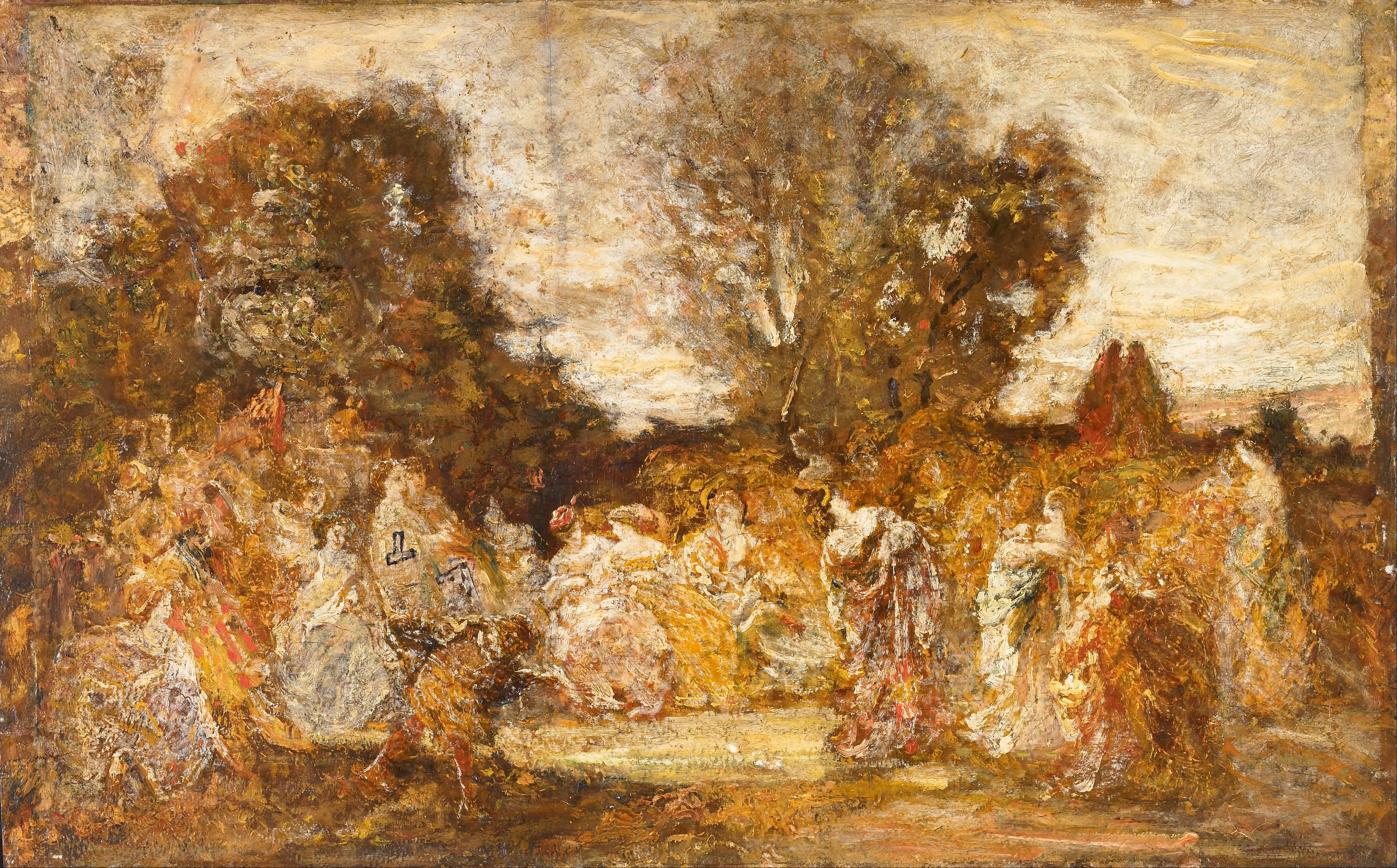
Ladies in a Garden, 1870

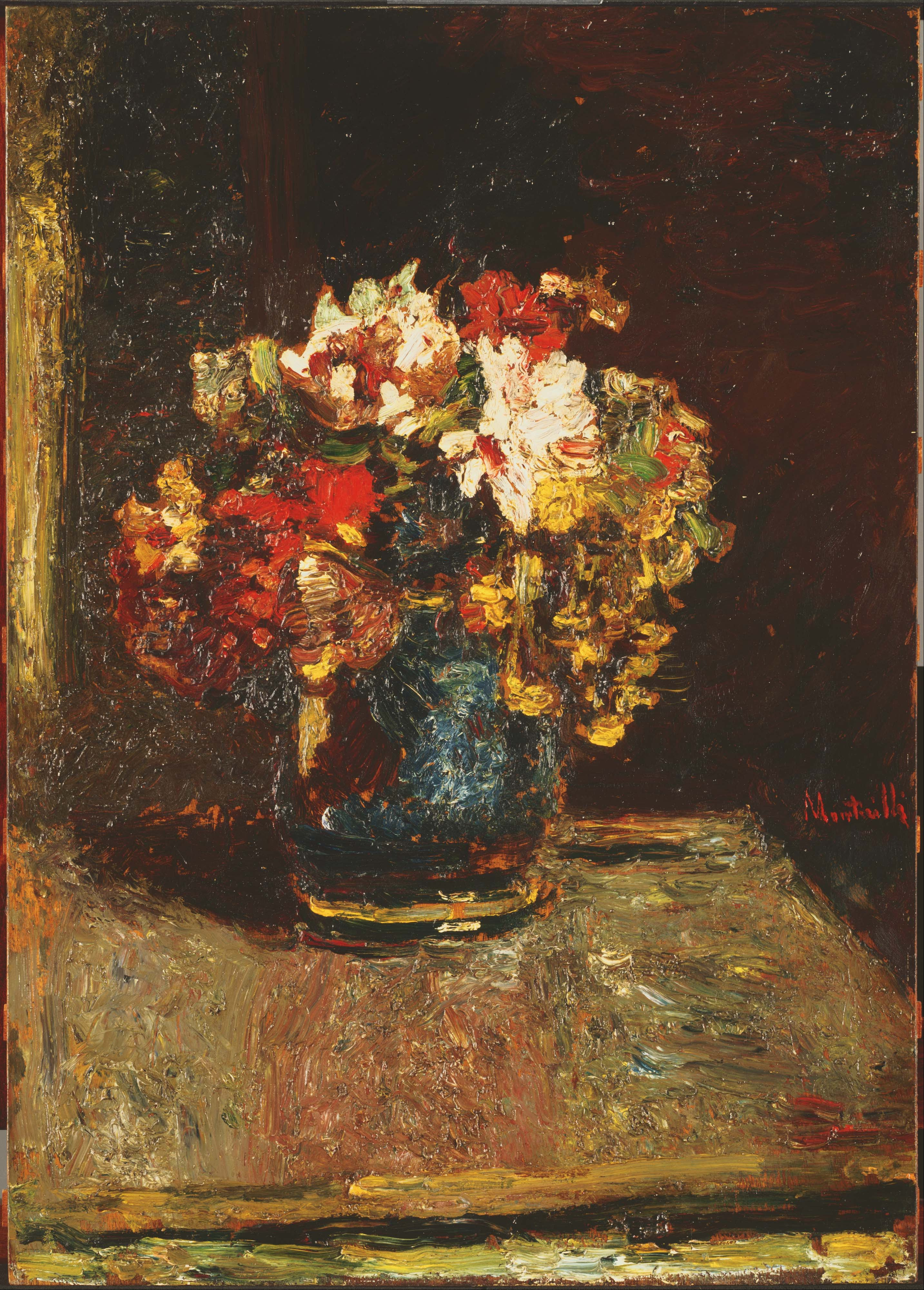
Flowers in a Blue Vase, c. 1875. Clark Art Institute

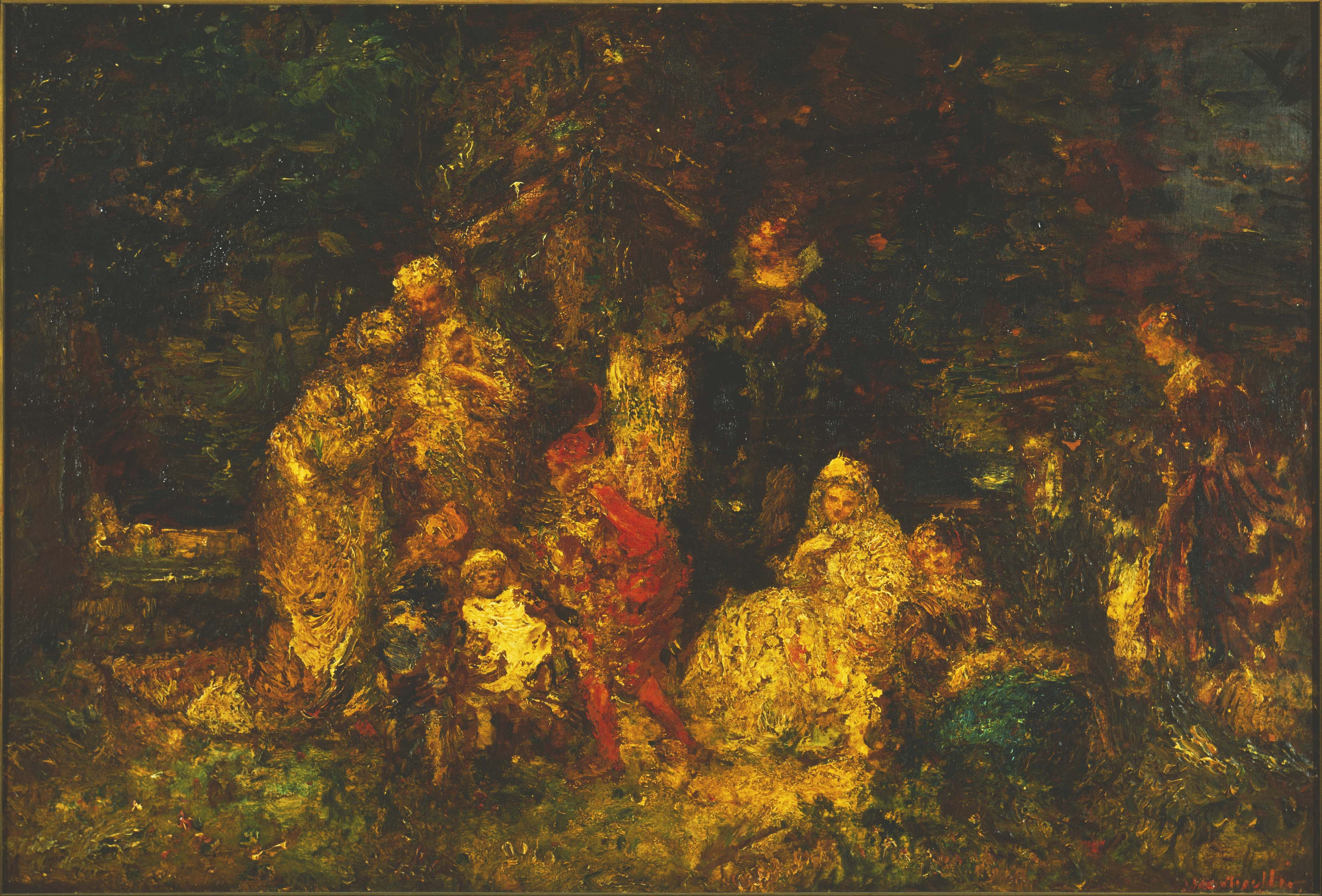
As You Like It

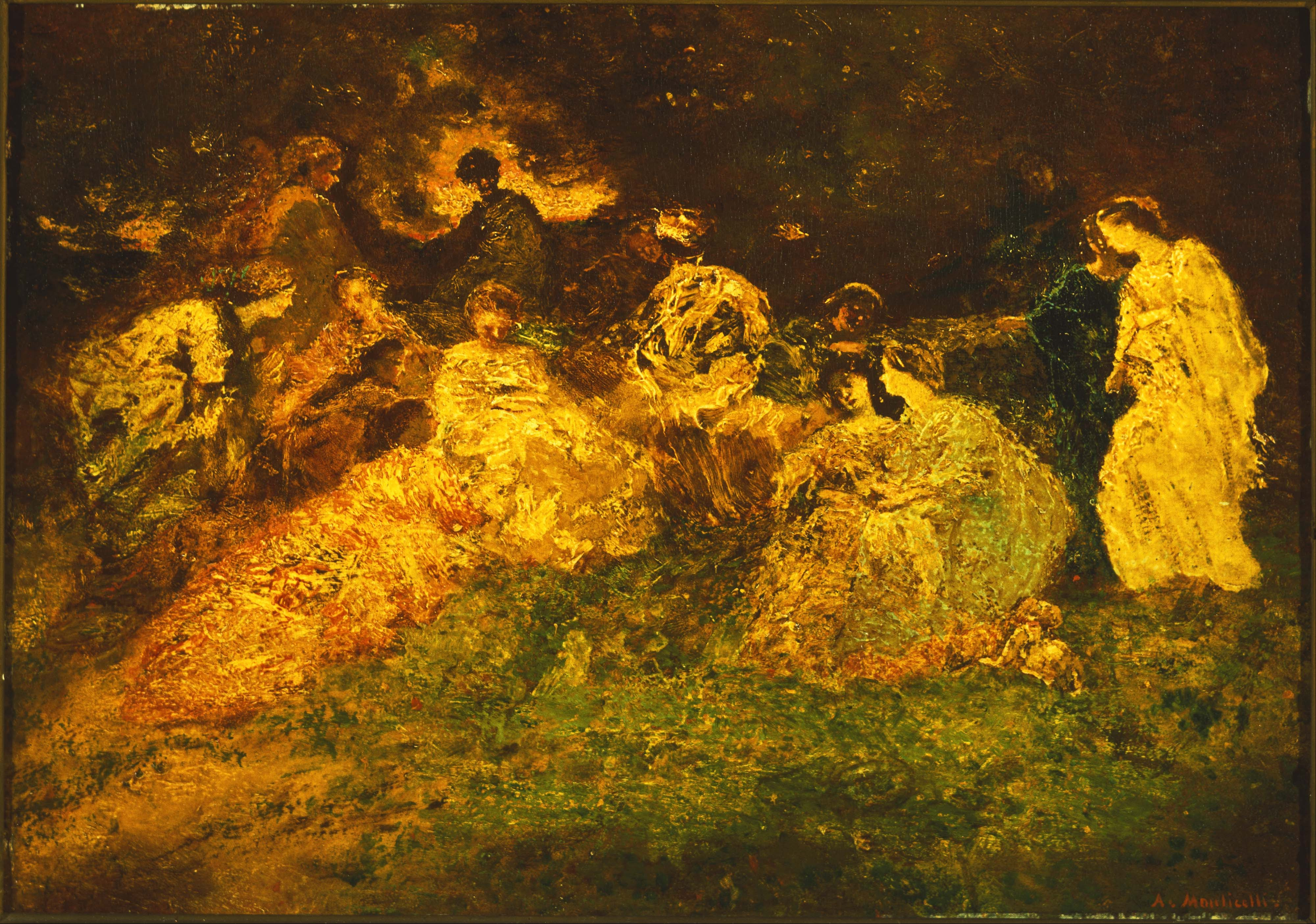
Fete Champetre

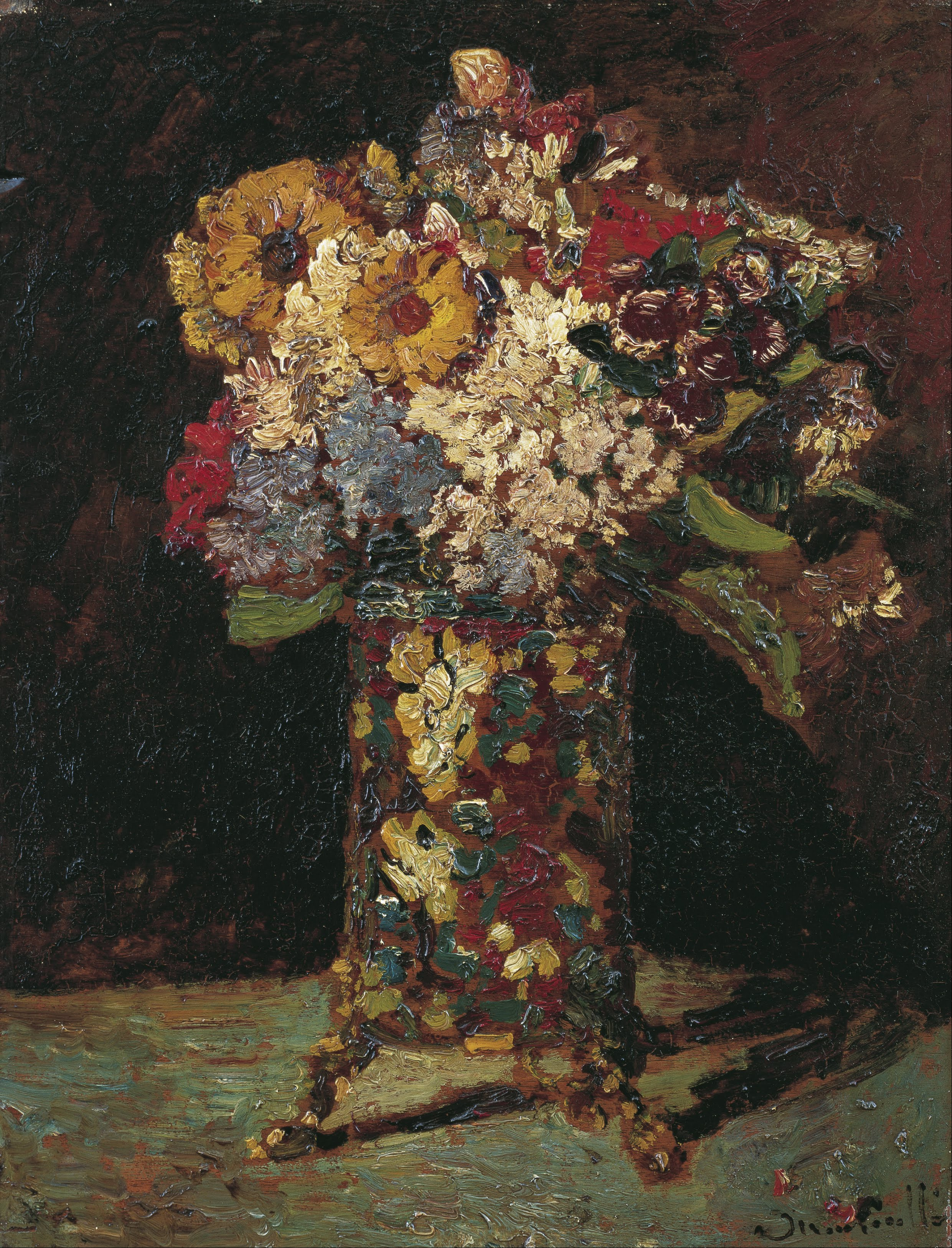
Flower Still Life, 1875

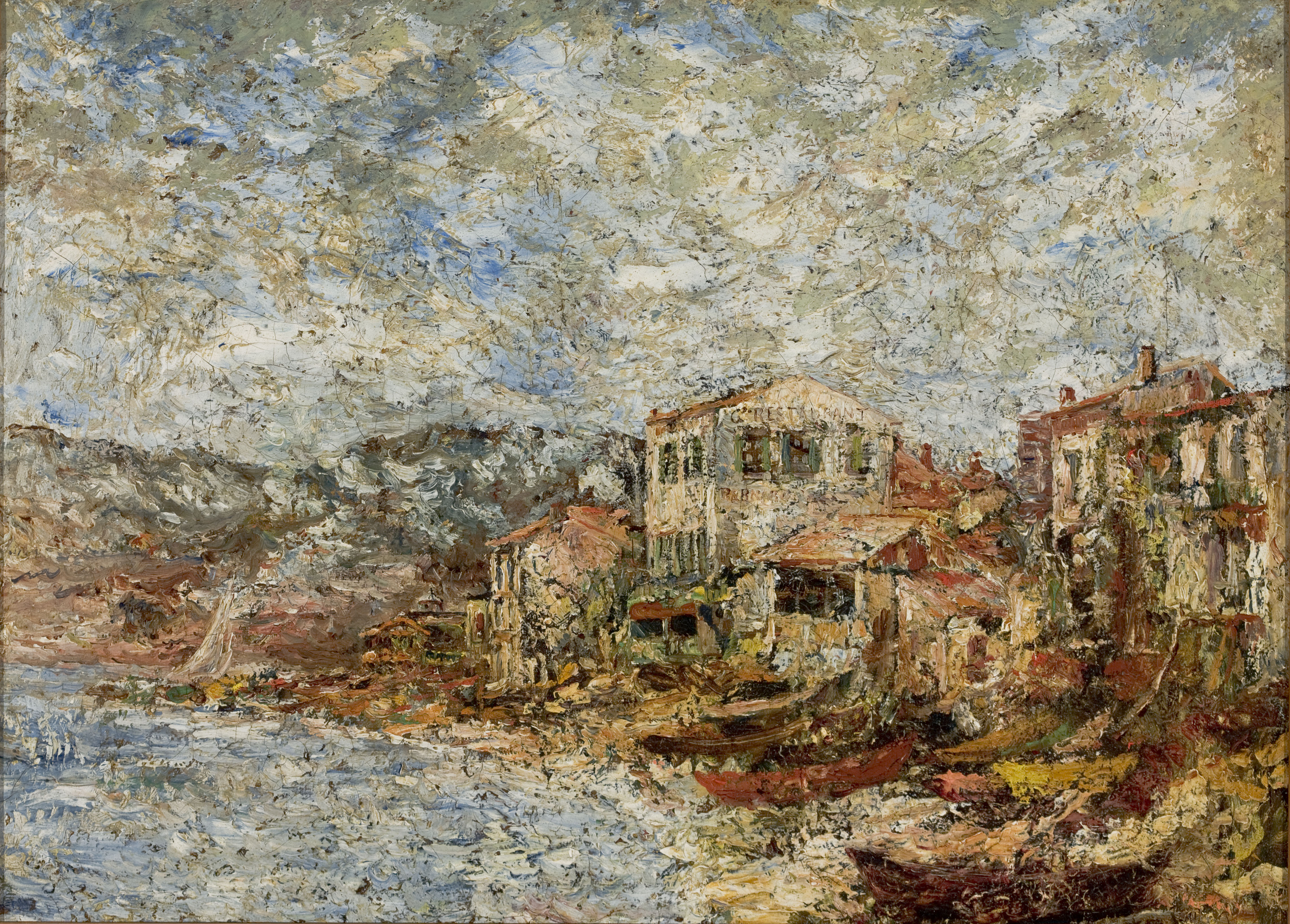
Seascape Near Marseille, 1880, São Paulo Museum of Art

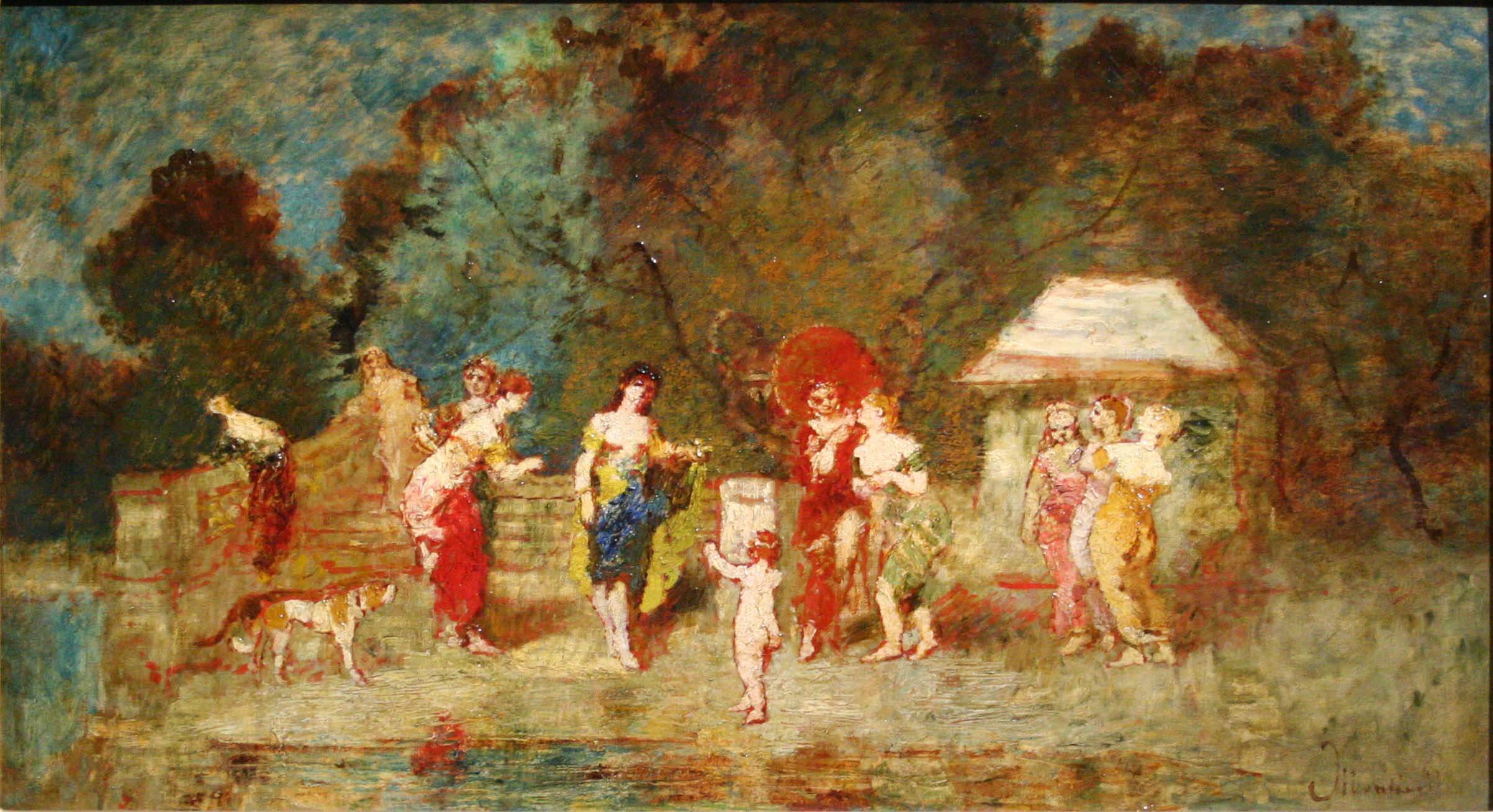
Scène de parc, femmes, enfants et chiens

== Sources ==
- Loan exhibition of paintings by Adolphe Monticelli. New York: Paul Rosenberg & Co. Catalogue no. 91, 1954. LC 73171702 Loan exhibition of paintings by Adolphe Monticelli (1824-1886) 15 November to 11 December 1954 | Open Library
- Monticelli Ausstellungskatalog, Hamburger Kunsthalle, April - Mai 1966. [Text in German] Monticelli | Open Library
- Impressionism. (1973). New York, N.Y.: Chartwell Books Inc.
- Sheon, Aaron. Monticelli, his contemporaries, his influence. Pittsburgh: Museum of Art, Carnegie Institute, 1978. LC 78060375 Monticelli, his contemporaries, his influence | Open Library
- Garibaldi, Charles, and Garibaldi, Mario. Monticelli. Geneva: Skira, 1991. ISBN 2-605-00190-3 [Text in French.]
- Turner, J. (2000). From Monet to Cézanne: late 19th-century French artists. Grove Art. New York: St Martin's Press. ISBN 0-312-22971-2
- Stammegna, Nadine. Monticelli écrit par Van Gogh. Marseille: Transbordeurs, 2003. ISBN 2-912728-20-7 [Text in French]
- Raillard, Joseph. Monticelli l'étrange. Marseille: A. Dimanche, 2008. ISBN 978-2-86916-163-4 [Text in French]
- Catalogue of the Van Gogh - Monticelli exhibition. Paris, Editions RMN, 2008. ISBN 978-2-7118-5418-9

== Bibliography ==
- Arnaud d’Agnel, Gustave and Isnard, É. Monticelli, sa vie et son œuvre, Paris: Occitania, 1926.
- Gouirand, André. Les Peintres provençaux: Monticelli, 1900.
- Guidou, Paul. Adolphe Monticelli, étude biographique et critique, Paris: 1890.
- Guinand, Louis. La Vie et les Oeuvres de Monticelli, 1891.
- Maglione, André. Monticelli intime, 1903.
- Martin, Étienne. "Impromptu sur Monticelli," a paper read at the Académie de Marseille in 1922.
- Monge, Jules. Adolphe Monticelli, heures intimes, Revue Massilia, 1910.
- de Montesquiou, Robert. "Monticelli," Gazette des Beaux-Arts, 43° année, 3° période, vol. XXV.
- Négis, André. Adolphe Monticelli: châtelain des nues (Collection: La Vie de bohème #7), Paris: Bernard Grasset, 1929.
- Servian, Ferdinand. "Adolphe Monticelli" in Remarques sur la technique de quelques peintres provençaux, Marseille: de Barlatier, pp. 79–89.
