= Tarasque =

Creature from French mythology

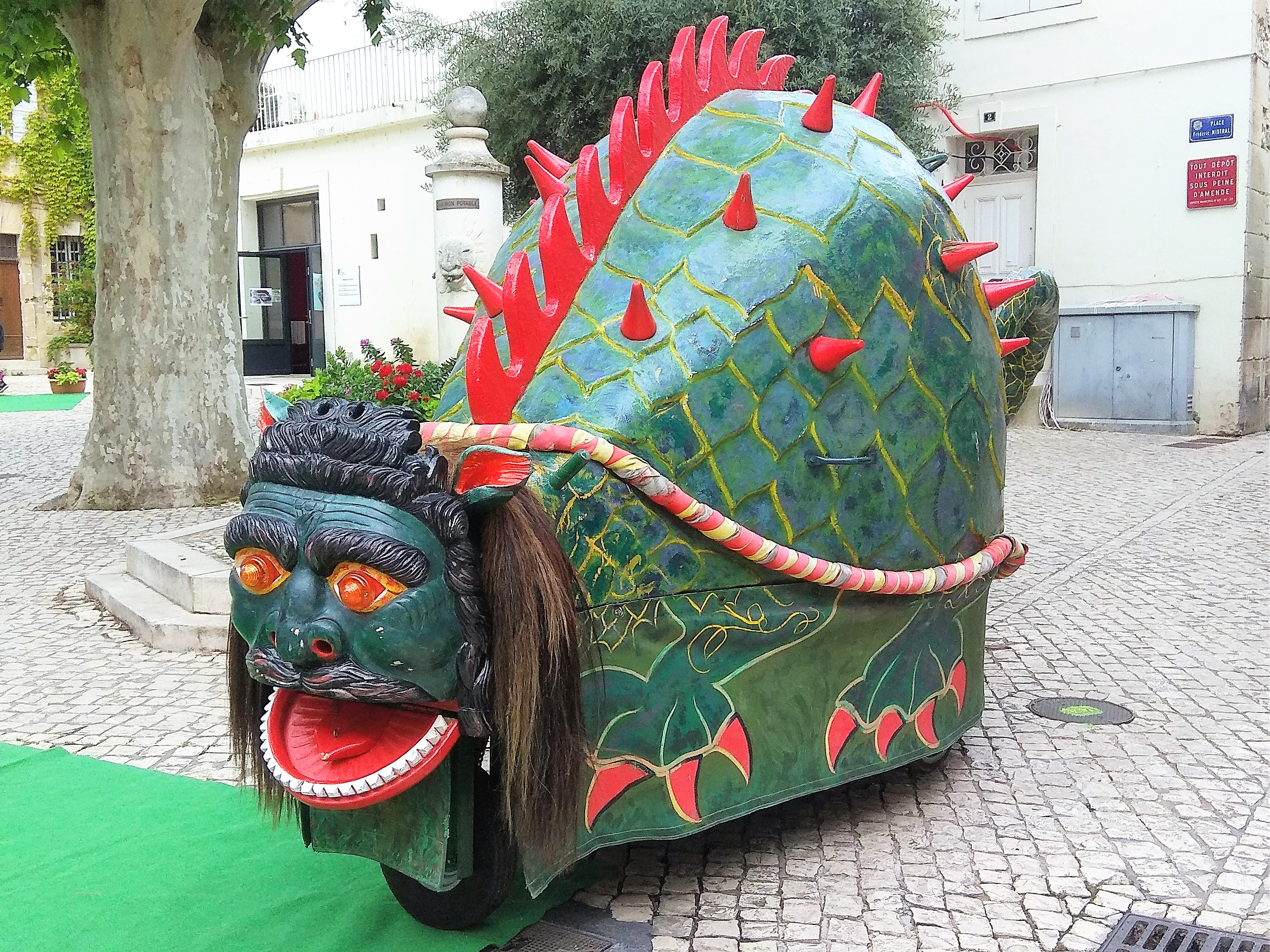
Fibreglass Tarasque in Tarascon

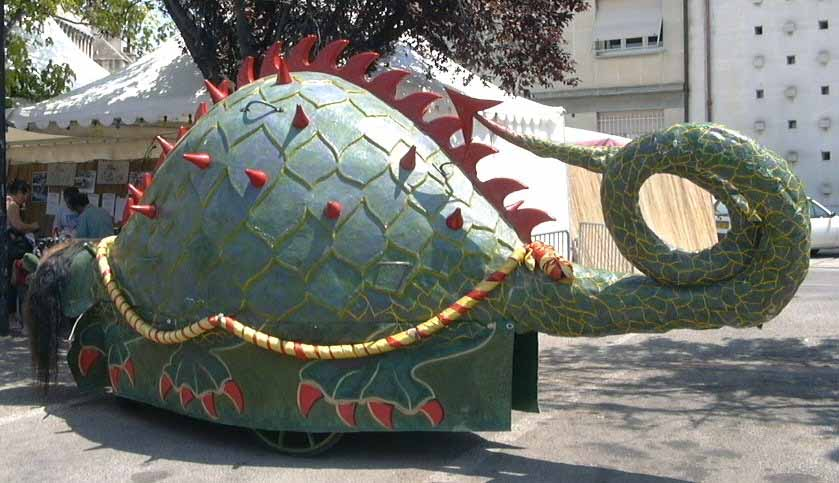
Rear view

——Tarascon, during the June celebrations

The Tarasque (Occitan: Tarasca) is a creature from French mythology. According to the Golden Legend, the beast had a lion-like head, a body protected by turtle-like carapace(s), six feet with bear-like claws, a serpent's tail, and could expel a poisonous breath.

Medieval iconography such as renditions in church sculpture did not necessarily conform to this description in the earlier Gothic period, and examples which seemed to were assigned later, in the 14th century. The six-footed, turtle-shelled tarasque was the form depicted on the city seal of Tarascon around the 15th century, and this held to be the norm in 16th- and 17th-century paintings. As St. Martha purportedly encountered the beast in the act of swallowing a human victim, it has become a stock motif in art to portray the monster swallowing a human (e.g. head first, with the victim's legs still dangling).

According to tradition, in 1474, René of Anjou initiated the use of the tarasque in the Pentecostal festival, and later used also on the saint's feast day of July 29. Yearly celebration in the last weekend of June was added in the modern day. The effigy or float (French: char) of the tarasque has been built over the years for parading through town for the occasion, carried by four to a dozen men concealed inside.

== Legend ==
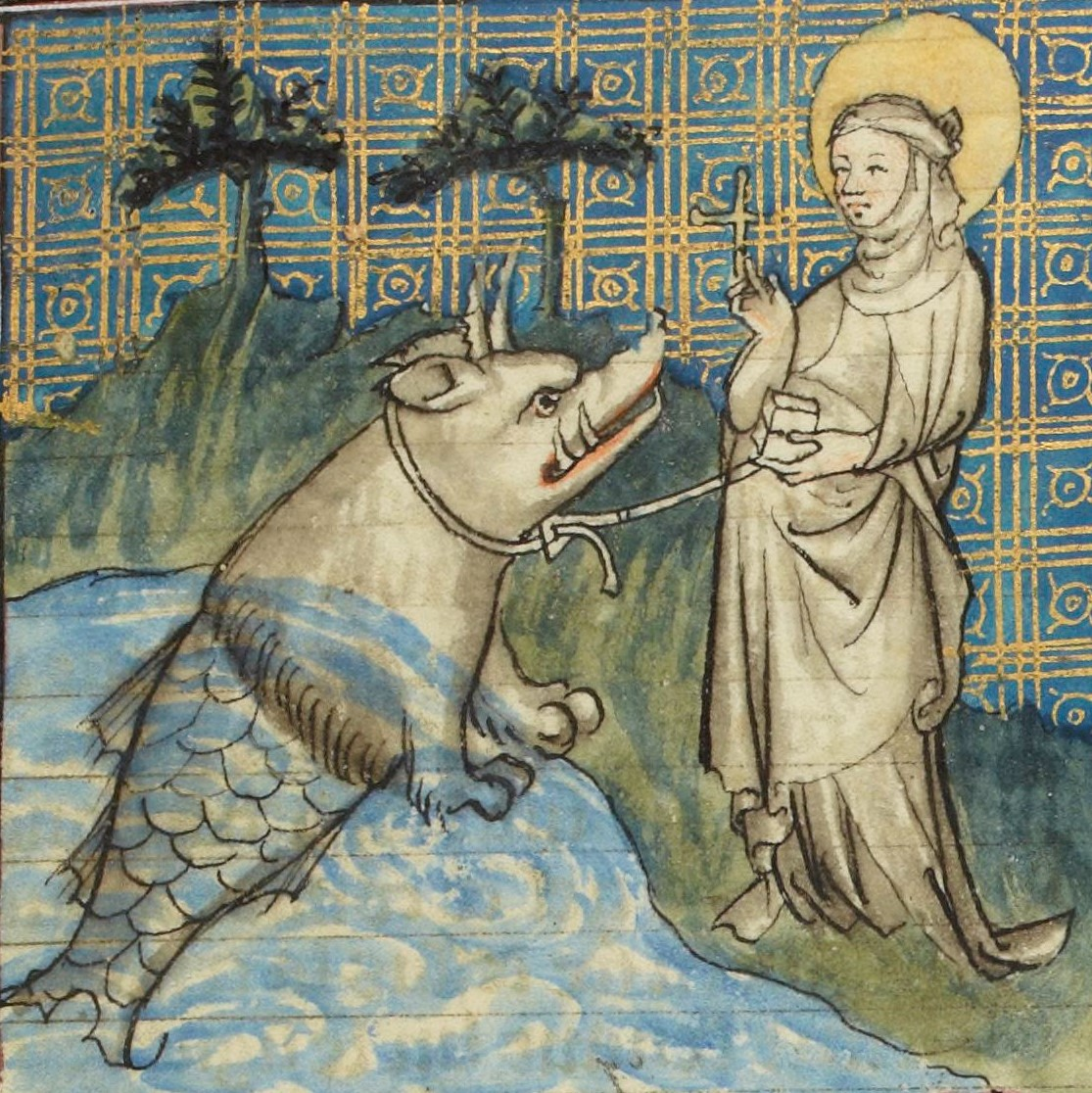
St. Martha and the tarasque, Legenda aurea
—BnF ms. français 242, c. 1402

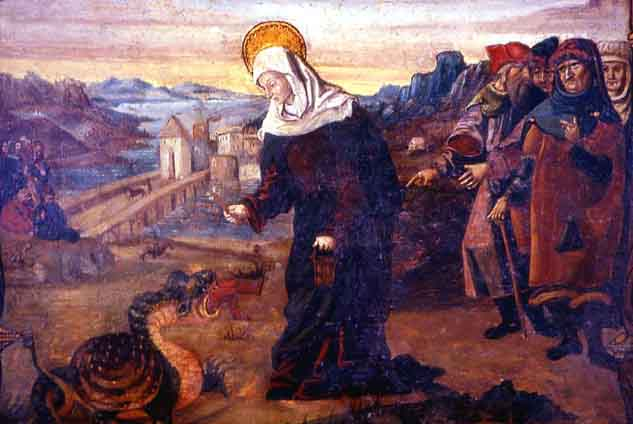
St. Martha and the Tarasque
—Painting by a 15c. Provençal artist. Chapel of St. Eligius/Eloi, Basilica of Saint-Maximin-la-Sainte-Baume.

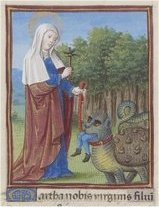
St. Martha and tarasque, Diurnal of René II of Lorraine
—c.1492/93 by Georges Trubert. BnF ms. Latin 10491

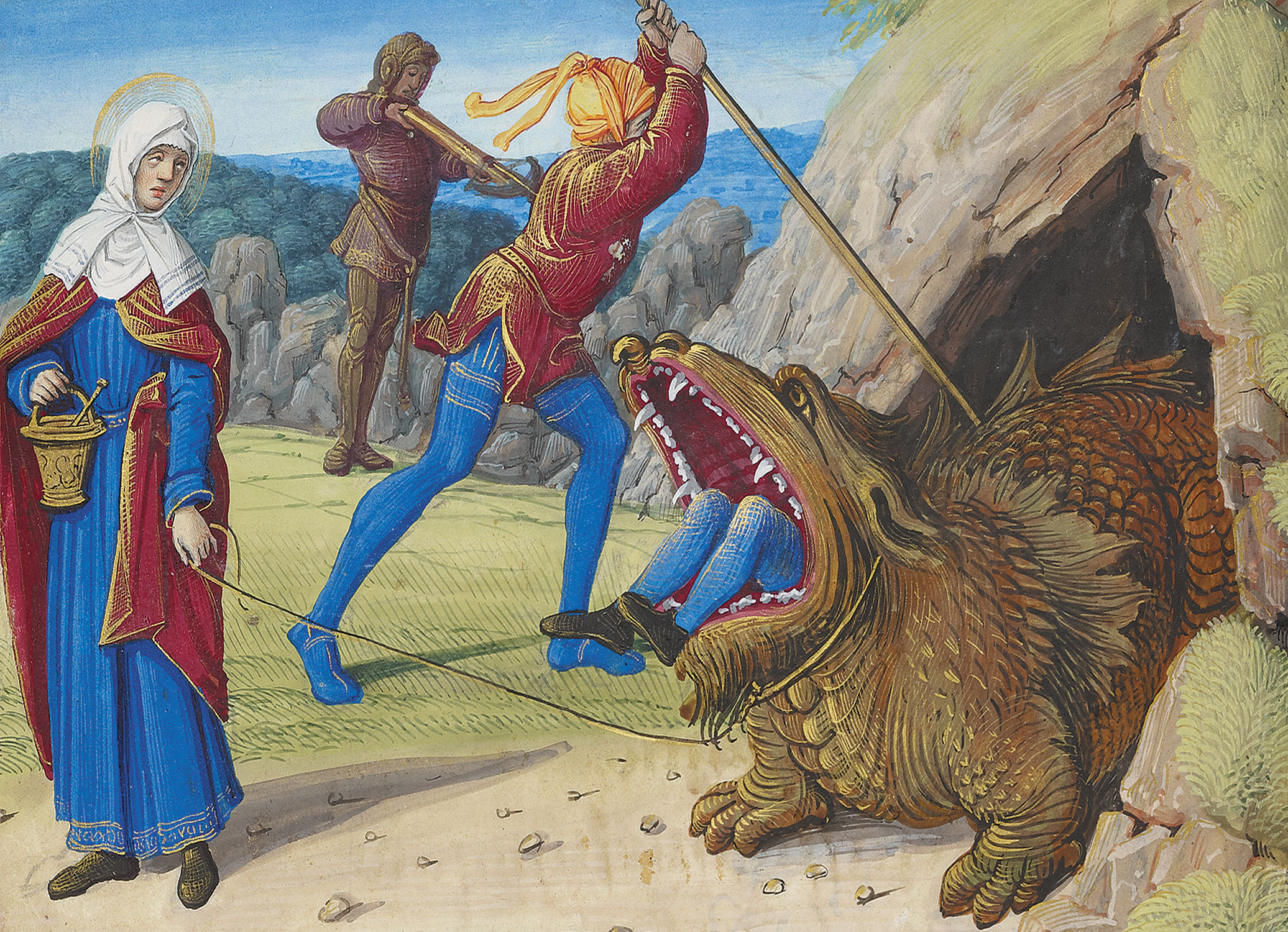
St. Martha and tarasque, Hours of Henry VIII
—ca 1500. Held by Morgan Library

The legend of the Tarasque probably arose in Provence, France, from early to late 12th century. The legend is recorded in several sources, but especially in the story of St. Martha in the Golden Legend (Legenda aurea), which was "the most influential". (Note: "LA" is the shorthand abbreviation used by Dumont, as compared "SH" for the Speculum Historiale version and "V" for the pseudo-Marcella version of the Life of St. Martha. These three texts are essentially similar.)

=== Legenda aurea ===
In Provence, France, the monster allegedly inhabited the forested banks of the Rhône between Arles and Avignon, around what is now the town Tarascon (then called Nerluc or 'black place'), but lurked in the river and attacked the men trying to cross it, sinking boats. The creature was described a dragon, half animal, half fish, thicker than an ox, longer than a horse, with "sword-like teeth". (Note: Cf. Latin text excerpted by Metcalfe.)

The Tarasque (Latin: Tarasconus) was said to have come from Galatia, a cross-breed between the biblical Leviathan and the legendary Onachus (or onacho, or bonacho (Note: The Latin onacho could be taken to be ablative with onachus being nominative.) (Note: Onachus/onacho (Latin: onacho) is read "bonacho" and given other spellings as well in variant texts. Caxton's translation also gives "Bonacho".)) of Galatia, this onachus being a creature that retaliated against pursuers by flinging its dung (Latin: stercus) like an arrow, and causing burns. (Note: Cf. Pliny's description of the bonnanus (Nat. 8.16) which shoots out burn-causing excrements.) The people besought Saint Martha for help, and she found the creature in the act of devouring a man. (Note: Medieval sculptures and paintings depict the creature still gorging on a man.) Merely by sprinkling holy water and holding up the cross, she caused the creature to become submissive and obedient. (Note: In art, Martha is frequently holding an aspergillum (holy water sprinkle). In the Hours of Henry VIII she holds a holy water bucket with an aspergillum dipping in it.) She then tied her girdle (to its neck (Note: to its neck (Latin: collum) is explicitly stated in the pseudo-Raban: "with her own girdle she bound its neck" or "having bound its neck with the girdle which she had been wearing (zona sua propria collum cinxit)".)), leading the beast to the villagers who cast rocks and spears at it until it died. (Note: Cf. Latin text excerpted by Metcalfe, and an excerpt from the Latin GL folio appended with Caxton's rendering in Brown's thesis.)

=== Other sources ===
The account of St. Martha and the tarasque in the Golden Legend ("LA") roughly correspond to the versions of the legend found in the pseudo-Marcella ("V"), and in Vincent de Beauvais's Speculum historiale ("SH"). (Note: "LA" (for Legenda Aurea), "V" for the Pseudo-Marcelle (ps.-Marcella), and "SH" for "Speculaum Historiale" are the shorthand used by Dumont (1951), p. 150.) (Note: Salomon (1962) refers to the pseudo-Marcelle as "ps.-Marcella".) are near contemporaneous works (late 12th and 13th century), with the pseudo-Marcella probably being the oldest, and dating "between 1187 and 1212 or 1221". The three texts LA, SH, and V are similar in content with only modest variations.

There is also a fourth variant Latin account, a "Life of St. Mary Magdalene and her sister St. Martha" (Vita Beatae Mariae Magdalenae et sororis ejus Sanctae Marthae) with somewhat divergent content from the other three, whose authorship had formerly been credited to Raban Maur (d. 856 AD), but since rejected as a false attribution, being the work of an unknown author perhaps as early as the late 12th century, or as late as the second half of the 13th century. The work is referred to as the "pseudo-Raban" by Louis Dumont and others.

There is also a brief notice on the tarasque which occurs in Gervase of Tilbury (Gervais de Tilbury). Gervase assigns the habitat of the tarasque (Latin: tarascus) to be an abyss near the city-gates of Arles and the rock/cliff beneath the castle/fort at Tarascon. (Note: Some redactions of Gervais lack the mention of the castle: "sub rupe Tarasconensis", and Watson (1901), p. 238 gives a translation without mention of castle. However a different copy reads "rupe castri Tarascensi", hence 'beneath the rock of the castle (castrum) of Tarscon'.)

== Description ==
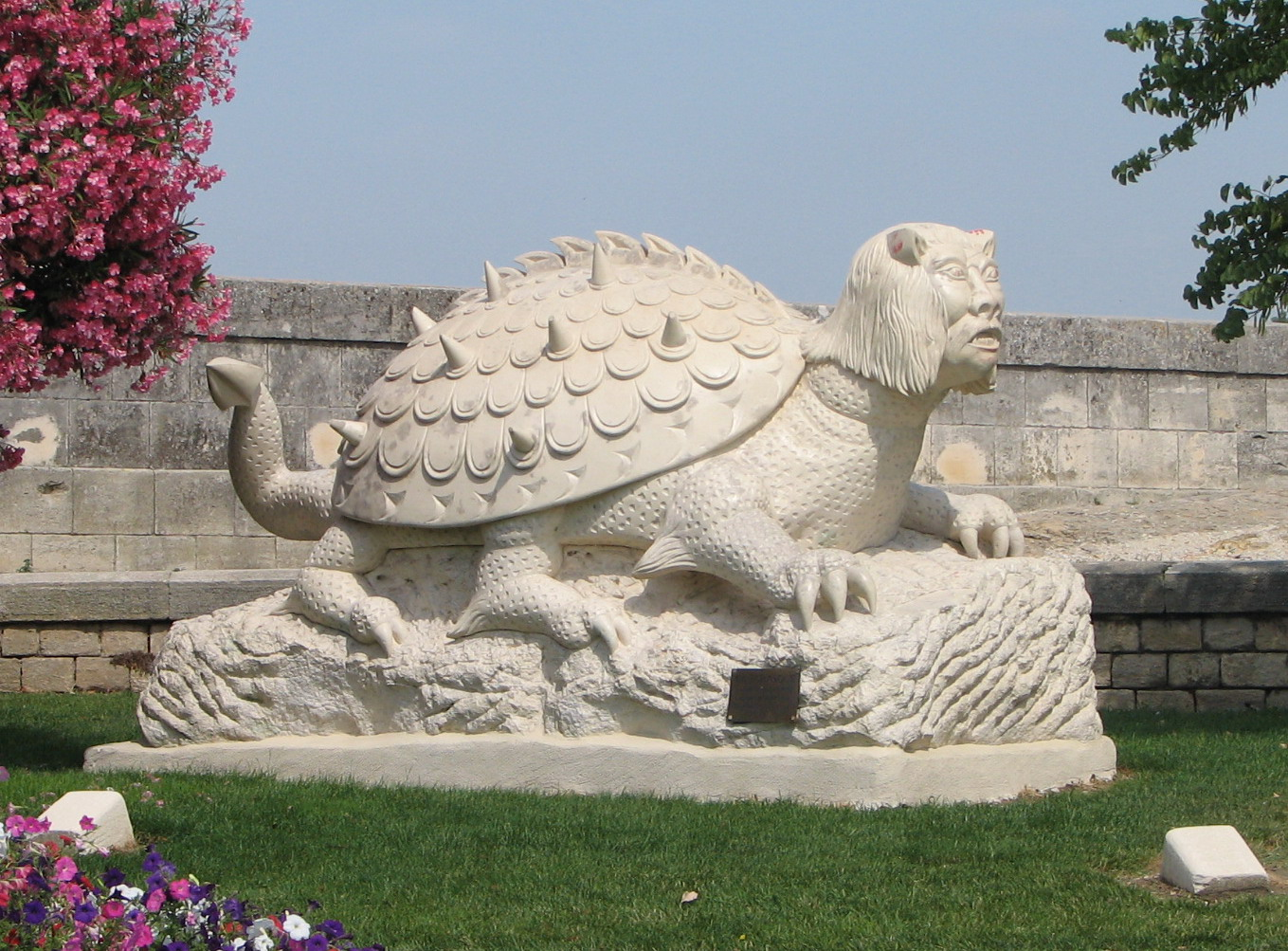
The Tarasque, near King René's castle in Tarascon

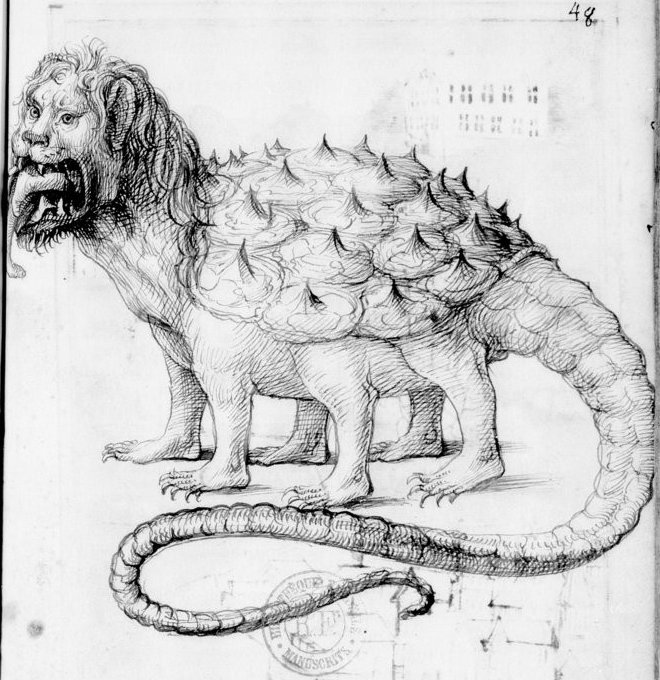
Tarasque. From Pierre Sala's Antiquités de Lyon (16c.)

As for the description of the tarasque's physical appearance given in the Legenda aurea, it is given a somewhat dissimilar treatment in the corresponding passage in the c. 1200 pseudo-Marcella:

draco ingens, medius animal terrestre, medius piscis . . . et erat grossior bove, longior equo, os et caput habens leoninum, dentes ut spata acutos, comas equinas, dorsum acutum ut dolabrum, squamas hirsutas ut taravos scindentes, senos pedes et ungues ursinas, caudam vipeream, binis parmis ut tortua utraque parte munitus.

— Pseudo-Marcella
Translation:

A huge dragon, half animal, half fish ... fatter than a bull, longer than a horse, it had the face and head of a lion, teeth sharp as swords, the mane of a horse, a back that was hatchet-sharp with bristly scales keen as augers, six feet with bear-like claws, the tail of a serpent, and a double shield/carapace, like a tortoise's, on each side.

— From the French translation

This description is said to "correspond rather closely" to 17th and 18th century iconography in paintings and woodcuts and to the modern-day effigy. Even the turtle-like carapaces (Latin: parmae "shields") is attested in this c. 1200 piece of writing, (Note: The tarasque has tough "flanks" like shields according to Stace's modern rendering, which Caxton translate as sturdy "wings".) even though some commentators ventured it to be a 15th-century addition, created out of expedience to conceal the men carrying the beast's effigy paraded through town for the Pentecostal festivities.

The head has later been described as being similar to a bull and a lion or having the muzzle/face of a lion, or, having the head of a lion with a black mane.

=== Tail ===
The "tail of a serpent" detail is given in both the Pseudo-Marcella and the Speculum Historiale. The tail was "long and ringed and looked considerably like that of the scorpion" in a lost sculpture on a face of an old church (Église Sainte-Marthe de Tarascon) according to surgeon-author Laurent Jean Baptiste Bérenger-Féraud. (Note: Bérenger-Féraud did not view the sculpture itself, but a "portrait" of this church. The sculpture is no longer extant, but described and illustrated by Conrad Mouren in his Notes mélangées, Tome IX, shortly before the church was damaged in 1793.) It is a ringed tail, and does turns upright as can be verified in facsimile sketch of the sculpture printed by Faillon. Some modern-day authors have gone a step further, claiming the tarasque's tail ended in a scorpion sting. Or rather, the tail terminated in a (cock's) spur according to writer Jean-Paul Clébert. There has also been past comment that the tail should end in an arrowhead's shape, according to tradition.

=== Poison breath ===
The pseudo-Raban speaks at length of the poisonous fumes exhaled by the tarasque:

draco terribilis oberrabat, incredibilis longitudinis, et magnae molis; fumum pestiferum flatu, scintillas sulphureas oculis, sibilos stridentes ore, rugitusque horribiles aduncatis dentibus, proferens; quidquid incidisset in eum ungulis et dente dilanians; quidquid propius accessisset anhelitus sui fetore mortificans.

— Pseudo-Raban, De vita beatae Mariae Magdalenae et sororis ejus sanctae Marthe. Cap. XL
Translation:

... terrible dragon of unbelievable length and great bulk. It breathed out poisonous fumes, shot sulfurous flames from its eyes, and emitted fierce hissings with its mouth and horrible noises with its curved teeth. With its talons and teeth it tore to pieces anyone who crossed its path; with its poisonous breath it killed anyone who came too near.

— Mycoff's translation

Rather than its eyes literally shooting flames, some French sources take it to be a figure of speech, that "its eyes glare sulfurously". (Note: Gilmore (2008), p. 367, translation of French local historian Jean Paul Nourri (1973), pp. 52–53, who gives "les yeux des étincelles sulfureuses".) (Note: Although Migne notes a passage in the Book of Wisdom (Sap. XI:18–19) for comparison which states that God's hand did not lack the means to send to sinners "a multitude of bears or bold lions,/ Or new-created wild beasts.. blowing out a fire-breathing blast, / Or mouthing out roarings of smoke, /Or flashing dreadful sparks from their eyes".) One source (Abbé François Canéto) has Raban Maur stating that the poison breath shot out of the tarasque's nostrils in thick vapours.

=== Medieval depictions ===
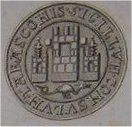
A dragon-like tarasque on the seal of Tarascon, 11th and 12th centuries (Note: On Faillon (1835), p. 16 and opposing plate, this illustration is captioned as 11th and 12th centuries, but the footnote (2) states 12th or 13th centuries, and also refers to a commentator which described the beast as a dragon guarding the castle.)

A crocodile-like tarasque, coin during King René's reign

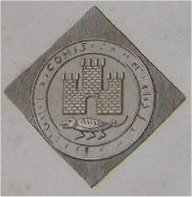
Tarasque on the greater seal of the city of Tarascon, 15th century

A tarasque, lesser seal of the city of Tarascon, 15th century. Labeled "TARAS" underneath

==== Heraldry and numismatics ====
The Tarasque is featured on the coat of arms of Tarascon, and here too, the beast/dragon is depicted as devouring a human, at least in later versions of the seal. In 11th or 12th century seals of the city, the tarasque is given an appearance of a crocodile or some sort of amphibian according to one opinion. The city seal from the 13th century appears much as a plain dragon according to one 18th century writer on medieval coats of arms, (Note: The author of Recueil de sceaux du moyen âge (1779).) though Faillon counters that this represents not a dragon guarding the city, but the tarasque. This early type perhaps dates to as far back as the 11th century, seen on seals struck on méreau type tokens. (Note: Or the twelfth century. Faillon inconsistently states that this representation "paroît sous une forme nouvelle, au douzième siècle, sur les sceaux (appeared in the 12th century in seals)" in the text proper, but "Le sceau de Trasocon, en usage aux douzième et treizième siècles (12th or 13th)" in note (2), then figure in the interleaving plate is labeled "Sur les sceaux de la Ville au XI et XII siècles (on the seals of the city in the 11th and 12th centuries)".) The later design of the seal depicting the tarasque with a (turtle-like) carapace appeared in the 15th century. (Note: Although Gutch states: "The carapace was already invented in René's time and it may be studied on his seals and coins", the supposed tarasque on the seal of King René resembles a crocodile; see also the illustration of a coin struck under King René 's rule.)

Later design of the city seal distinctly shows the tarasque swallowing a human. In the language of heraldry, the coat of arms has been described as featuring "below [the castle with crenelated towers argent] a dragon of sinople devouring a man and covered with scales of gold". (Note: A description of the blazon is also quoted and paraphrased by Gutch (1952), p. 200, taken from a postcard, and gives details down to the devoured man wearing golden garb and "blue stockings and black shoes".)

==== Illuminated manuscripts ====
In late medieval manuscripts, the monster is often depicted devouring people.

==== Architecture ====
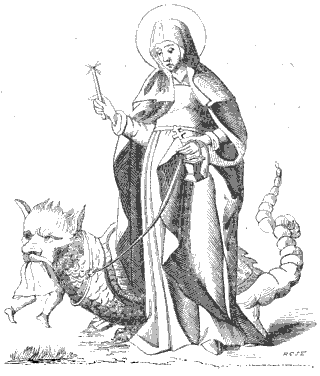
Lost sculpture at Église Sainte-Marthe de Tarascon
—After Conrad Mouren's drawing in the 1790s

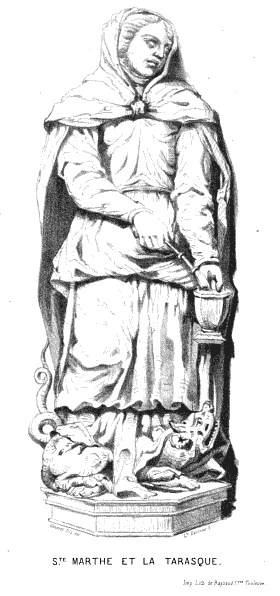
Martha and Tarasque sculpture, Auch.
—Choir stall of the Cathédrale Sainte-Marie d'Auch

There are also depictions in architecture.

The aforementioned sculpture once incorporated into the right side exterior of Église Sainte-Marthe de Tarascon purportedly dated to the 11th century, and counted as the oldest representation recorded. (Note: A facsimile of the lost sculpture is printed by Watson, as aforementioned, and the sketch which survived, according to a different source, was the one drawn by Conrad Mouren.) This sculpture of the tarasque depicted the beast in the act of devouring a human, in typical fashion. This tarasque was a quadruped that bore close resemblance to the beast trodden underfoot by St. Martha in the paneling sculpture of the choir stalls at Cathédrale Sainte-Marie d'Auch, according to Abbé François Canéto. (Note: A sketch of the Auch Cathedral sculpture is appended at the end (opposite p. 30) of Canéto's piece.) It depicts the monster that has (already swallowed the child head first), with the pair of the child's legs still showing between its lips.

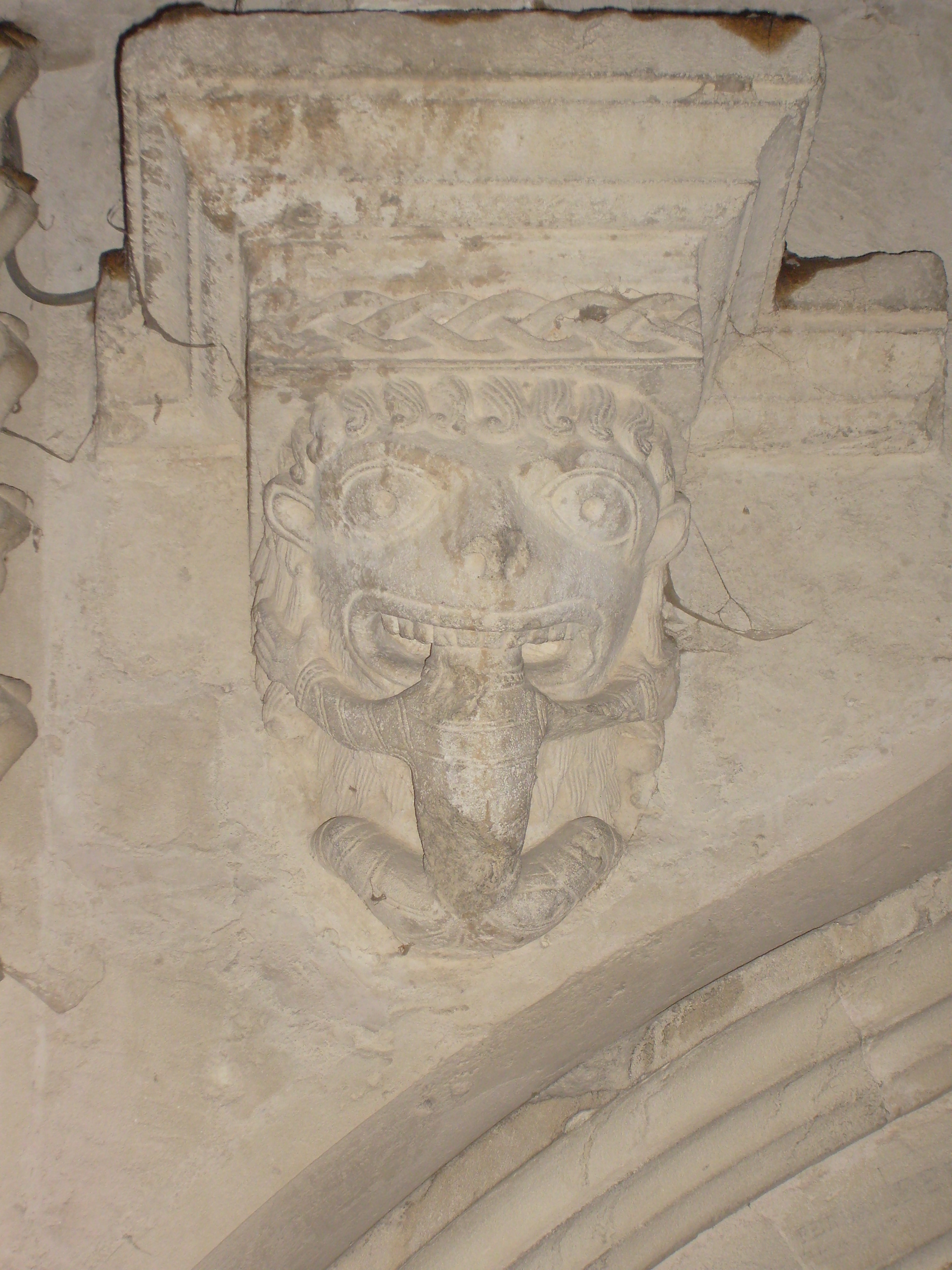
Tarasque devouring a man.
—Montmajour Abbey near Arles.

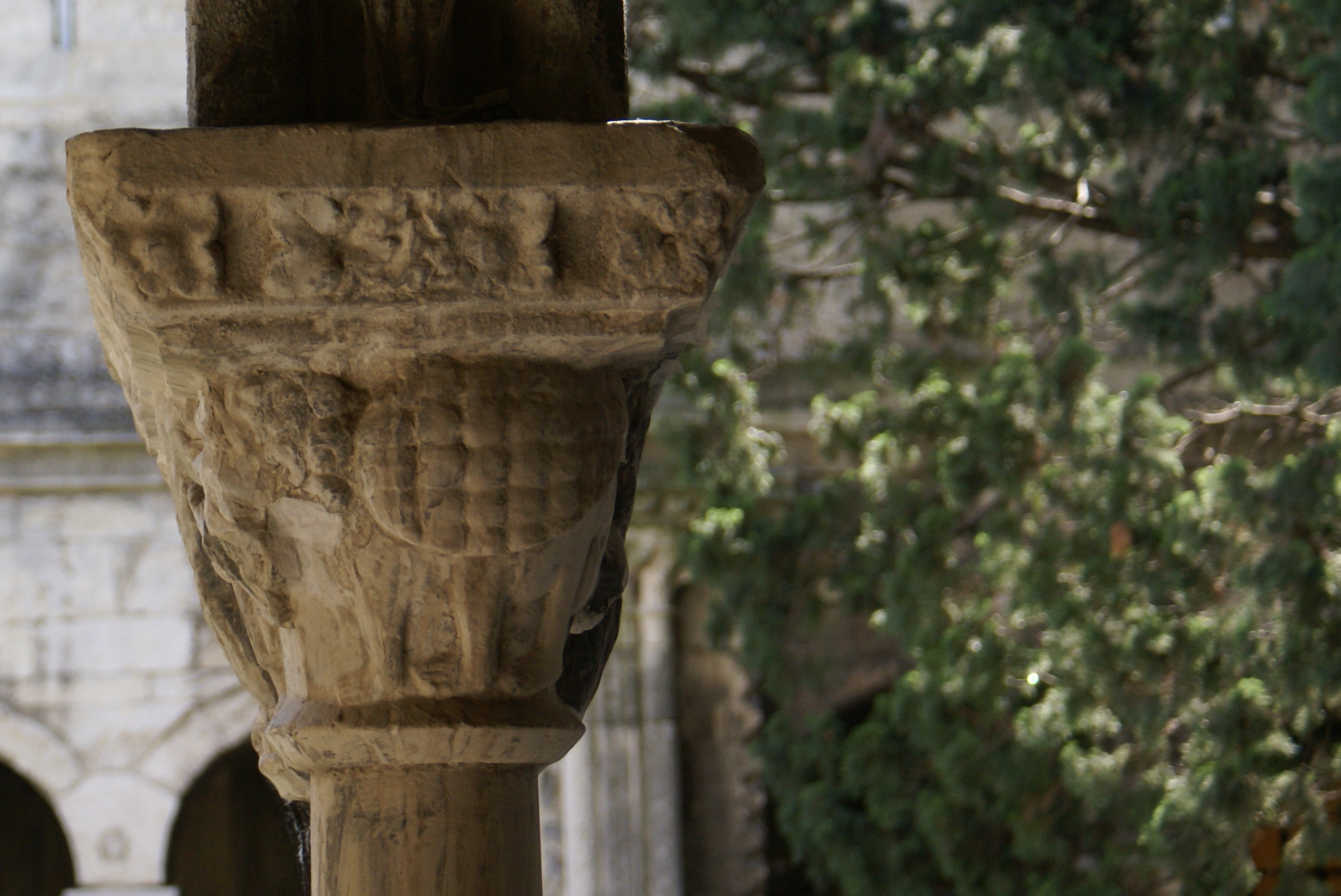
Column capital.
—Cloister of the Church of St. Trophime in Arles, 14th century, depicting the Tarasque.

Another example is the carving of a tarasque in the Montmajour Abbey near Arles.

Yet another is carved in the capital column of the Church of St. Trophime (Église Métropolitaine de Saint-Trophime) in Arles, dating to the mid-14th century, though earlier commentators, such as Faillon who supplied detailed drawings of the capital, considered it to be an example of early Gothic art from the 11th century.

== Festivities ==
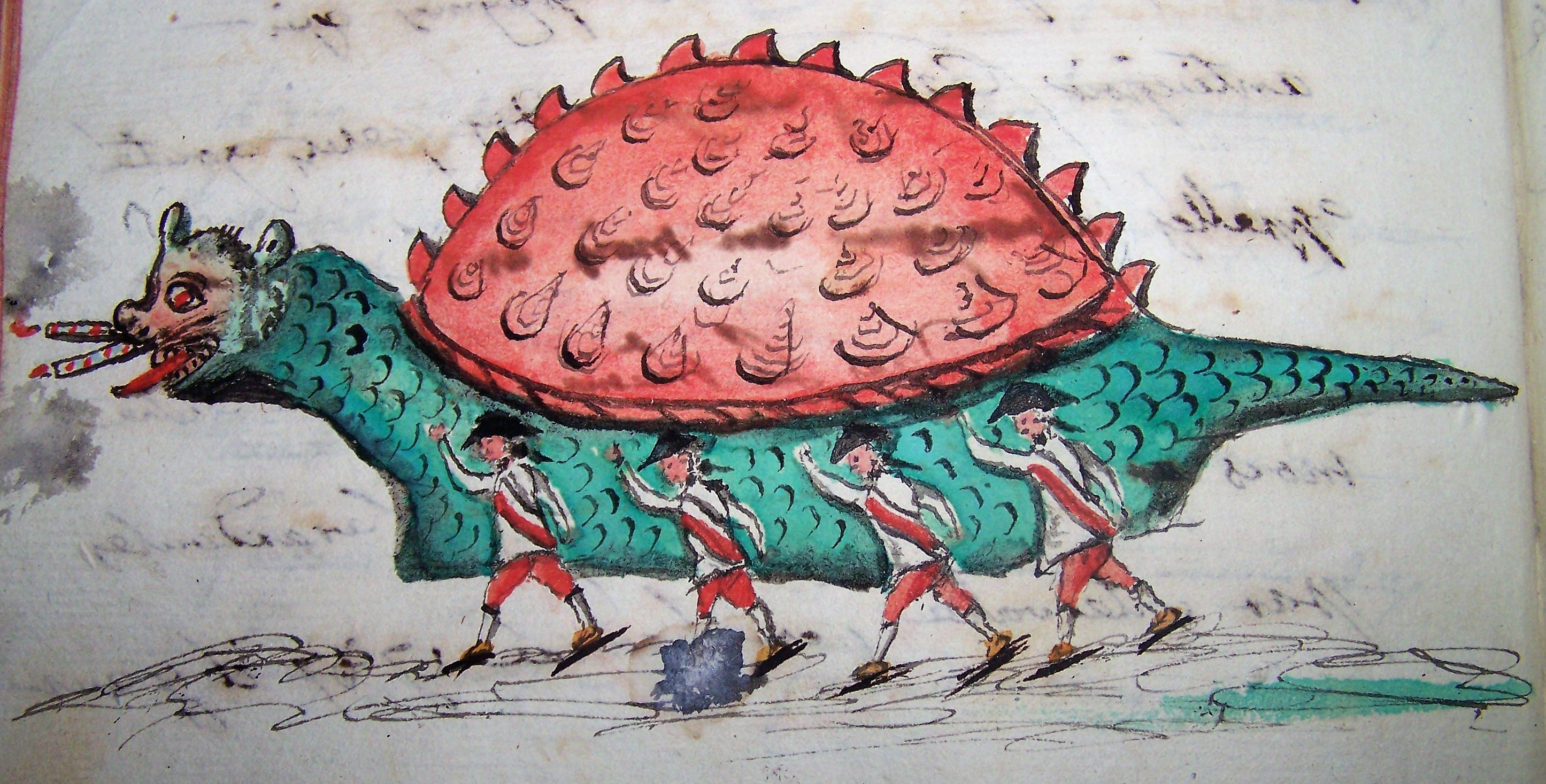
Tarasque effigy, illustration by Conrad Mouren, late 18th century

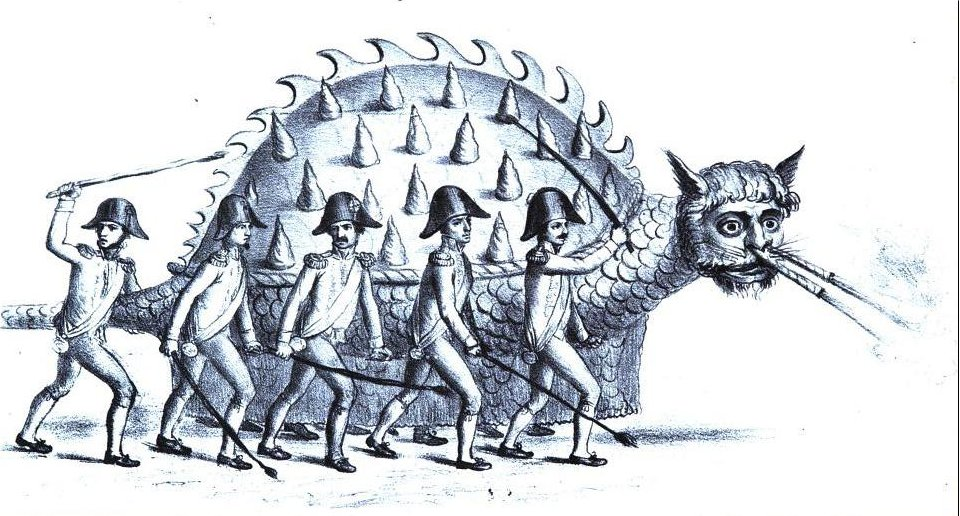
Tarasque effigy of Tarascon, 1846 illustration

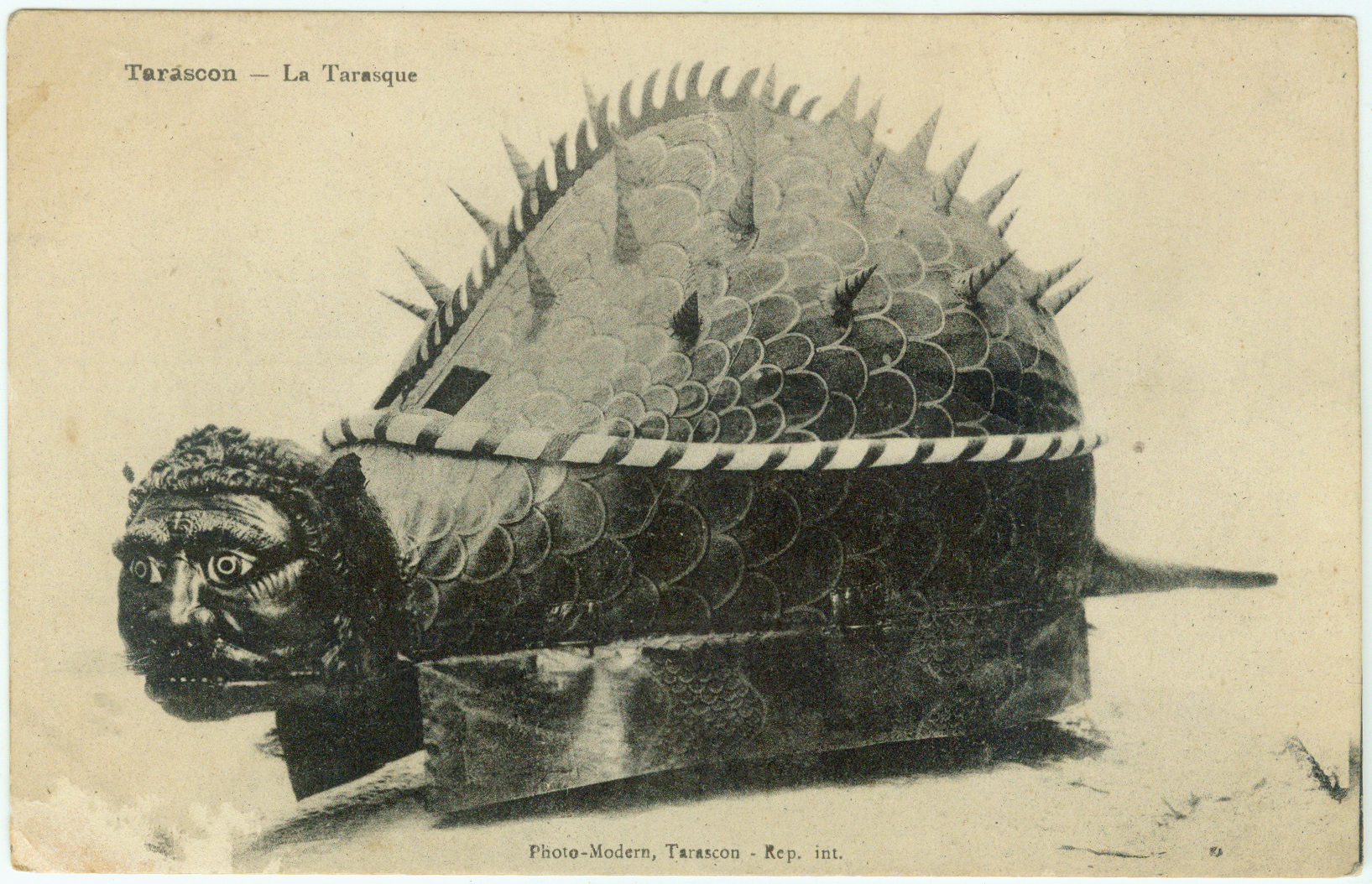
Tarasque effigy of Tarascon, early 20th century photograph

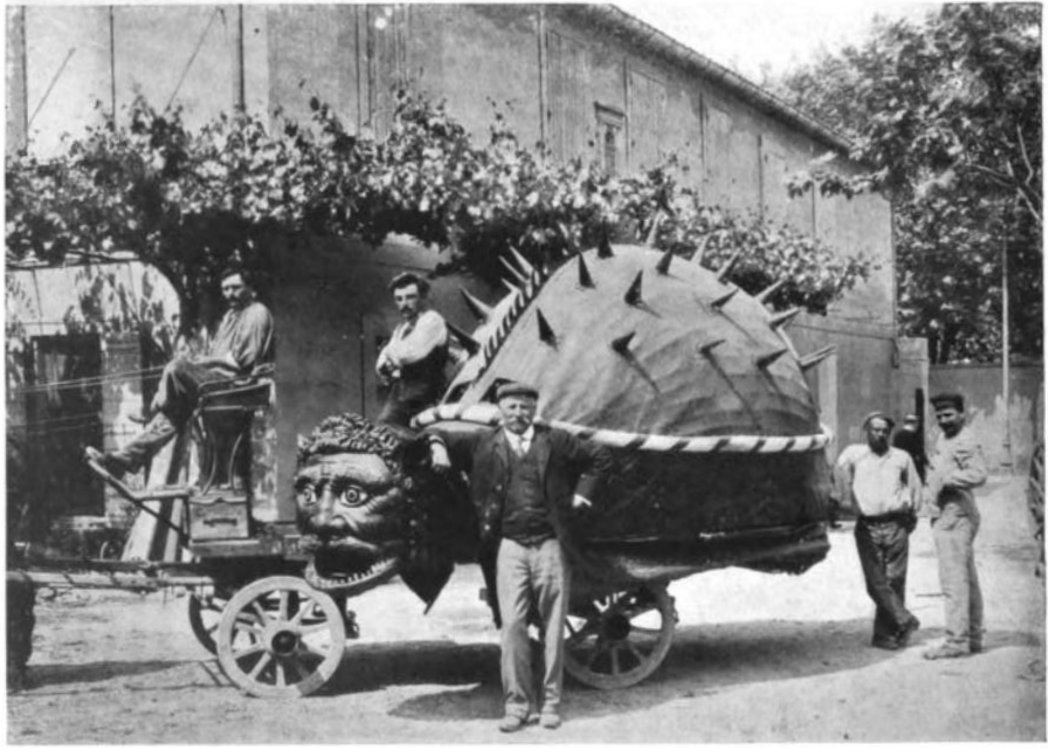
With mouth open, early 20th century photograph

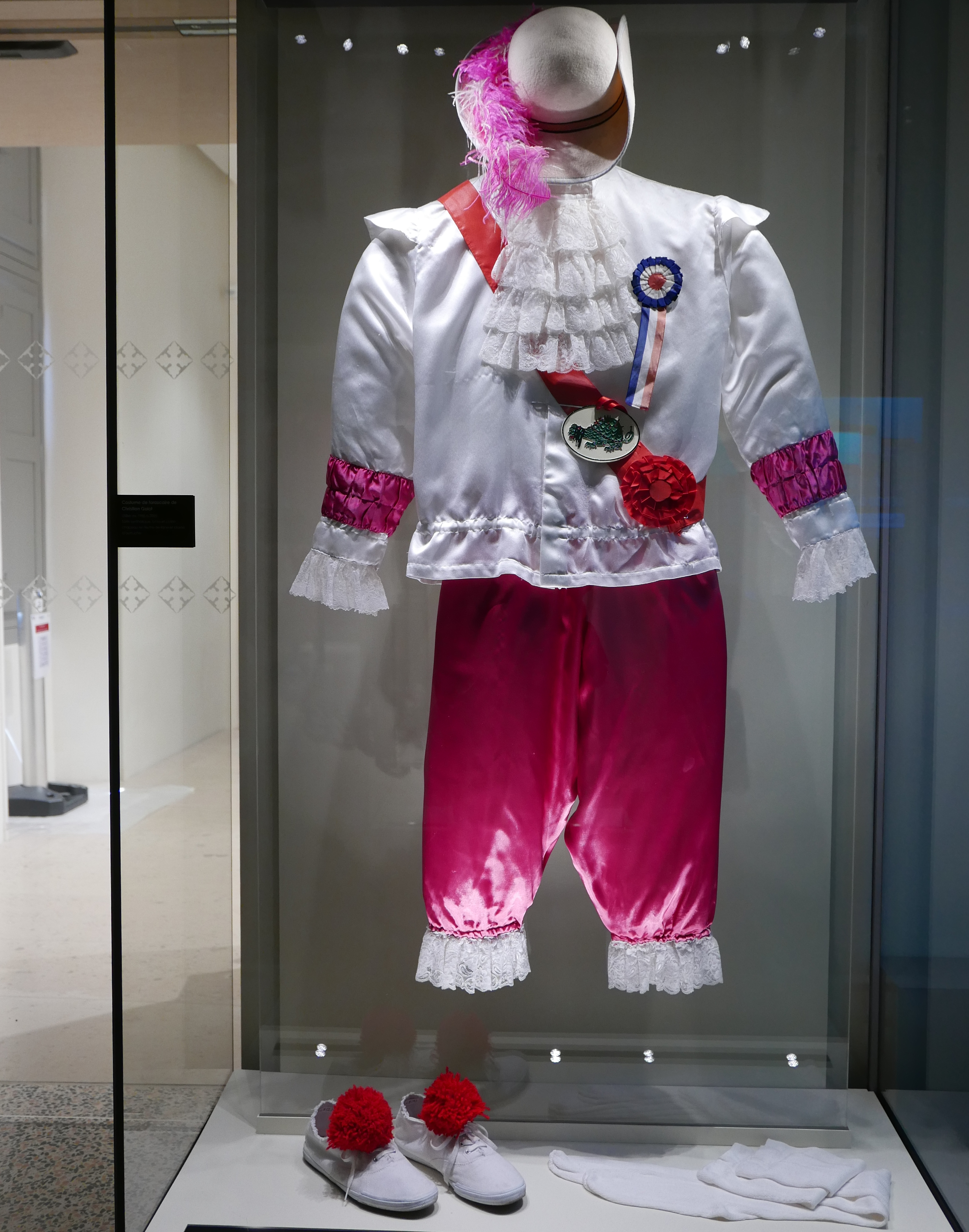
Tarascaïre costume in Museon Arlaten.

The festival of the tarasque was initiated on April 14, 1474, during Pentecost in Tarascon, at the behest of René of Anjou, in order to amuse his citizens with a reenactment of St. Martha's miracle. (Note: The 1474 date assertion by Villeneuve has been repeated by others, but it has not been possible to trace the corresponding base material, although there is an unedited document of 1478(?) found by Charles Mourret indicating the king order the fashioning of the effigy ("pro faciendo unam tarascam mandato regio".) (Note: René dressed up as a tarasque in the 1469 masquerade, noted by Walter Scott.) Later, a second festival was held on 29 July, the feast-day of Saint Martha.

In former days, the effigy of the tarasque was paraded through the streets twice a year, and a maiden portraying St. Martha escorting the tarasque held it by the leash (or a white ribbon) in one hand.

In the modern day (post-World War II), the festival came to be held annually on the last Sunday of June, to tell the tale of the Tarasque, as well as Tartarin, the main character of Alphonse Daudet's Tartarin of Tarascon.

=== 19th century descriptions ===
The tarasque paraded through the streets once changed from a wooden prop painted green to a metallic contraption in the early 19th century. Aubin-Louis Millin (1808) described the tarasque effigy as wooden, and consisting of hoops covered in painted cloth. German writer Christian Friedrich Mylius (1818) elaborated that "Every year on the 2nd day of Pentecost, a grotesque wooden likeness of the dragon, or the Tarasque, is carried through the city; it resembles a turtle; it consists of a wooden framework covered with wax canvas, (Note: Or calico.) painted apple-green, with gilded hooks and thorns on its back". A tarasque used in the jeu de tarasque during the Pentecostal festival is described by the Count of Villeneuve in 1826, as an effigy of a "monstrous dragon, whose torso is assembled from hoops covered with a painted sheet metal, and whose back is made using a huge shield to imitate a turtle's carapace. The paws are clawed, the tail scaly and several times curved, the head is like a bull and a lion. A gaping mouth reveals several rows of teeth".

The wooden hull described in 1818 required eight men to carry, the metallic version needed 12 men. The tarasque of the festival of 1846 concealed four porters inside, (Note: Revue Britannique (1846), p. 799: "quatre portefaix".) and the one in 1861 needed six men.

The head could be manipulated by a person inside, making the effigy's jaws open or close; from out of its nostrils fuses or rockets were made to poke out and ignited so it issued fiery sparks.

During the festival, while the huge effigy of the Tarasque is carried through the streets, there are shouted the traditional cries for the tarasco in a popular song attributed to King René of Anjou: (Note: The first and the third—"let the witch (masquo) pass"—lines are quoted by Desanat; the first two lines are also quoted in 1846 article, though rendered in French, thus: "Lagadigadeau! la trasque! le château".)

Lagadigadèu, la Tarasco, la Tarasco
Lagadigadèu, la Tarasco dóu castèu
Leissas-la passa la vièio masco,
Leissas-la passa que vai dansa.

— Text of song as set down by Frédéric Mistral
Translation:

Lagadigadèu, The tarasque, The tarasque
Lagadigadèu, The tarasque of the Chateau
Let her go by, The old witch
Let her go by, For she's going to dance! (Note: French translation by Koschwitz is as follows: "Lagadigadèu, la tarasque,.. / Lagadigadèu, .. du Château / Laissez-la passer La vieille sorcière /Laissez - la passer – Car elle va danser !)

— English translation by Janvier

It later became established that the jeu de Tarasque would commence at Pentecost and continue to the feast day of Saint Martha on July 29, or the festival was held on those two days as two acts.

=== Modern-day effigy ===
By the 20th century, the tarasque effigy used in Tarascon was mounted on a wheeled cart, which are dragged or pulled by persons known as Tarascaïres, and these attendants of the tarasque could intermittently break off and engage in dance (farandole).

=== Dates of observation ===
In the past, the festivals were only held sporadically in a major way, e.g., in the years 1846, 1861, 1891 and 1946 but since 1946 they have become a yearly event and tourist attraction.

In the gap years (first half of the 20th century) when the jeu de Tarasque was in hiatus, different authorities were claiming different weeks and weekdays around Pentecost Sunday for the proper day for the ceremony, according to Eliza Gutch (d. 1931)'s paper, published posthumously. (Note: According to her, the first of two tarasque festivals was to be held somewhat later than Pentecost, on the Thursday after Trinity Sunday according to her best authority, though she was aware of others claiming Whitsunday (Pentecost Sunday) or two Sundays after it.)

A tarasque feast was held on a non-traditional day on 23 June 1946 in Tarascon, for practical reasons. Subsequently, the holding of the tarasque festival in this last Sunday or weekend of June became annually recurrent.

The Tarasque was designated one of "Processional Giants and Dragons in Belgium and France" listed in November 2005 as part of UNESCO's Masterpieces of the Oral and Intangible Heritage of Humanity.

=== In Spain ===
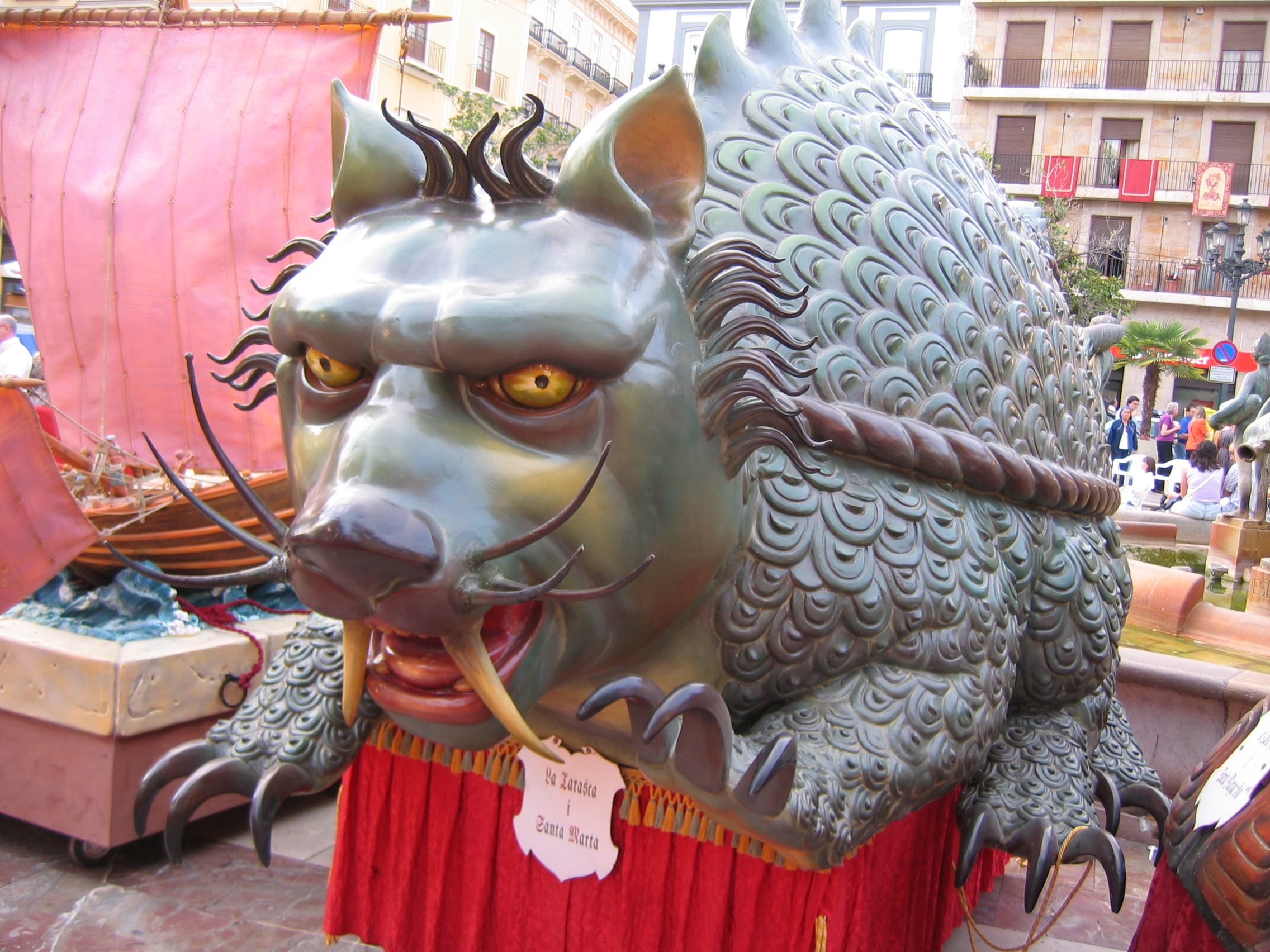
Tarasque at a Corpus Christi procession in Valencia

The Tarasca (Spanish for Tarasque) is one of the statues of the Corpus Christi procession, paraded through a number of Spanish cities, and elsewhere throughout the Iberian peninsula, for example, the cities of Granada, Toledo, and Valencia, and the city of Madrid.

The first record of the tarasca legend in the peninsula comes from Seville in the year 1282, shortly after the reconquista of the city in the mid-13th century. (Note: Gilmore (2008), p. 368 citing Cuesta García (2002), p. 182.)

The Spanish version is tinged with misogynistic elements, or rather repudiations against biblical and historical temptresses, with statues and statuettes of such female figures (called "tarasquillas") surmounted on top of the tarasca dragon. The figure atop the Granada dragon is a life-size doll resembling a retail store mannequin, and the tiny blonde-hair figurine set atop the papier-mâché tarasca of Toledo is supposed to represent Anne Boleyn.

Historically in the city of Seville, it was originally a young boy called a tarasquillo (rather than a modeled figure) who was seated atop the processional dragon. But in 1637 the boy was replaced by a well-adorned woman, and in 1639 it was prescribed that she should be an ugly old woman.

The word tarasca has entered the Spanish vocabulary in the sense of an ill-natured woman, or a "hussy". A 19th-century dictionary defines the tarasca as a "crooked, ugly, lewd, and impudent woman", and the word is known to have been used in the sense of "ugly old woman" in the 16th century.

== Theories ==
=== Celtic origin hypothesis ===
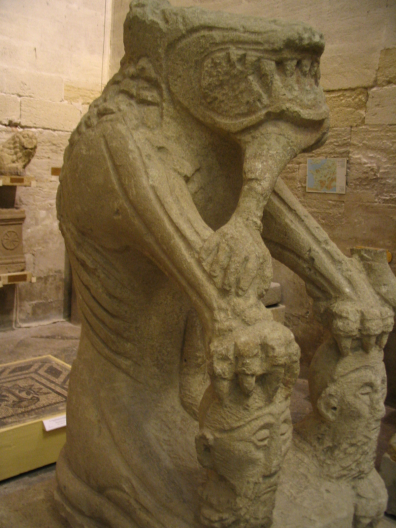
Tarasque de Noves, dated to 3rd to 1st century B.C.

A pre-Christian Celtic origin for the legend has been proposed, and endorsed by some writers.

French archeologist Isidore Gilles proposed the pre-Christian pagan origins for the legend of the tarasque, and connected with the so-called "tarasque of Noves", unearthed at the village Noves, once called "Tarasconnet". The find was a stone statue of a sharp-toothed chimeric beast with a scaly back, "crunching a human arm in its mouth". (Note: Gilles states a child in the mouth, but it looks to be an adult arm.) Gilles postulated this was a Celtic deified beast to which human sacrifices were offered.

Gilles's theory was embraced by the Provençal poet Frederic Mistral, and Dumont was disinclined to dismiss Mistral's belief altogether. French scholar Philippe Walter also states that the Saint Martha legend is undoubtedly "superimposed on old beliefs of Celtic paganism".

=== Parallels ===
Parallels have been drawn with the French legends of the Graouilli in Metz, and the Gargouille of Rouen defeated by St. Romanus, which are also processional dragons in religious observances.

A legendary dragon or dragon-like marine creature reported to have appeared in Vietnam's Halong Bay has been called the "Tarasque" after the famed creature of Tarascon.

== Commemorations ==
The Tarasque was designated one of "Processional Giants and Dragons in Belgium and France" listed in November 2005 as part of UNESCO's Masterpieces of the Oral and Intangible Heritage of Humanity.

== See also ==
- Saint Martha
- Tarasque, a towed 20 mm anti-aircraft gun (53 T2) used by the French military
- Tarrasque, a monster in Dungeons & Dragons
- Bowser
- Tarascosaurus, a dinosaur named after the Tarasque
- Ankylosaurus
- Mont Gerbier de Jonc
- Gargouille of Rouen
- Graouilli
- Peluda
- Coco or coca

== Works cited ==
- Barbour, John (1896), Metcalfe, William Musham (ed.), Legends of the Saints in the Scottish Dialect of the Fourteenth Century, vol. 3, Edinburgh: William Blackwood and Sons, pp. 198–204 Alt URL
- Benoit, Fernand [in French] (1952), "(Book review) Dumont (Louis). La Tarasque. Essai de description d'un fait local du point de vue ethnographique", Revue belge de Philologie et d'Histoire (in French), 30 (3–4): 1012–1015
- Bérenger-Féraud, Laurent Jean Baptiste [in French] (1886). "2 La Tarasque". Réminiscences populaires de la Provence (in French). Paris: Ernest Leroux. pp. 33–80.
- Brown, Patricia (July 1998). The role and Symbolism of the Dragon in Vernacular Saints' Legends, 1200-1500 (PDF) (Ph.D.). University of Birmingham. pp. 1–199.
- Canéto, Abbé (François) (1853–1860), "Essai Iconographique sur Sainte Marthe et sur le monstre qui l'accompagne ordinairement dans les oeuvres d'art chrétien: à propos d'une sculpture des boiseries du choeur de Sainte-Marie d'Auch", Mémoires de la Société Archéologique du Midi de la France (in French), 7: 7–30
- Desanat, Joseph (1846). Coursos dé la Tarasquo et jocs founda per lou rey Réné (in Occitan). Arles: D. Garcin.
- de Courtois, Alfred (1848), "Méreaux des monnoyers de Tarascon, lettre à M. de Lagoy", Revue numismatique (in French), 13: 66–71
- Dumont, Louis (1951). La Tarasque: essai de description d'un fait local d'un point de vue ethnographique L'Espèce humaine (in French) (6 ed.). Paris: Gallimard. ISSN 2649-8952.
- Ettlinger, Ellen (1964), "The Ligurian Heracles and la Tarasque", Ogam Tradition Celtique, 16: 157–172
- Faillon, Étienne-Michel (1818). Monuments inédits sur l'apostolat de Sainte Marie-Madeleine en Provence (in French). Vol. 1. Paris: J.P. Migne.; Volume 2 (1848); 1865 edition at the HathiTrust Digital Library
- —— (1835). Monumens de l'église de Sainte-Marthe à Tarascon, département des Bouches-du-Rhône: avec un essai sur l'apostolat de Sainte-Marthe et des autres saints tutélaires de Provence (in French). Tarascon: Aubanel.
- Fournier, Laurent-Sébastien (2013), "Intangible Cultural Heritage in France: From State Culture to Local Development", in Bendix, Regina; Eggert, Aditya; Peselmann, Arnika (eds.), Heritage Regimes and the State (2nd rev. ed.), Universitätsverlag Göttingen, pp. 327–340, ISBN 9783863951221
- Gilmore, David D. (September 2008), "'Tarasca': Ritual Monster of Spain", Proceedings of the American Philosophical Society, 152 (3): 362–382, JSTOR 40541592, PMID 19831233
- Gueusquin, Marie-France (1992). Cités en fête: Musée national des arts et traditions populaires, 24 novembre 1992-19 avril 1993 (in French). Monique Mestayer. Paris: Éd. de la Réunion des musées nationaux. p. 95. ISBN 9782711827138.
- Gutch, Eliza, Mrs. (December 1952), "Saint Martha and the Dragon", Folklore, 63 (4): 193–203, doi:10.1080/0015587X.1952.9718131, JSTOR 1257108
- Ingersoll, Ernest (1928). Dragons and Dragon Lore. Henry Fairfield Osborn (intro.). New York: Payson & Clarke.
- —— (2005) [1928]. Dragons and Dragon Lore. Mineola, NY: Dover. ISBN 9780486440743.
- —— (1995) [1928]. The Illustrated Book of Dragons and Dragon Lore. Chiang Mai: Cognoscenti Books. ASIN B00D959PJ0.
- Millin, Aubin-Louis (1808a), Voyage dans les départements du midi de la France, vol. 3, Paris: De l'Imprimerie Imperiale
- —— (1808b). Travels in Southern France's départements – via Wikisource. (translation)
- Mistral, Frédéric (1862a), "Li fèsto de la tarasco", Armana Prouvençau (in Occitan), 3: 71–84
- —— (1862b). Les fêtes de la Tarasque, suivi des Airs traditionnels des Jeux de la Tarasque (in French).
- —— (1900). Koschwitz, Eduard (ed.). Mirèio: poème provençal (in French). Oskar Hennicke. Marburg: N. G. Elwert.
- Mycoff, David, ed. (1989). The Life of Saint Mary Magdalene and of Her Sister Saint Martha: A Medieval Biography. Kalamazoo, Michigan: Cistercian Publications. ISBN 9780879076085.
- Mylius, Christian Friedrich (1818). Malerische Fußreise durch das südliche Frankreich und einen Theil von Ober-Italien (in German). Vol. 2. Karlsruhe.
- Peters, Diane E. (September 1997), "The Life of Martha of Bethany by Pseudo-Marcilia", Theological Studies, 58 (3): 441–460, doi:10.1177/004056399705800303, S2CID 56448114, ProQuest 212690323
- Salomon, Richard G. (January–June 1962), "Aftermath to Opicinus de Canistris Saint Martha and the Dragon", Journal of the Warburg and Courtauld Institutes, 25: 137–146, doi:10.2307/750550, JSTOR 750550
- Véran, Joseph (1868). Histoire de la vie et du culte de Sainte Marthe, hôtesse de Notre Seigneur Jésus Christ, patronne ... d'Avignon, etc (in French). Avignon: Seguin ainé.
- Very, Francis George (1962) [1956]. The Spanish Corpus Christi procession: a literary and folkloric study. Tip. Moderna.
- Villeneuve, Christophe de (1826). Statistique du département des Bouches-du-Rhône: avec Atlas (in French). Vol. 3. Marseilles: Antoine Ricard.
- Watson, Arthur (1901), "The Tarasque", The Antiquary, 37: 234–239 Tarasque
- Westerbeck, Cynthia (Winter 2002), "From Kitchen Scold to Dragon Slayer: The Gospel According to Martha" (PDF), Spectrum: Journal of the Association of Adventist Forums, 30 (1): 11–16; copy via Google
