= Linsdorf monster =

External image
- The Linsdorf monster via Armit (2012)

The Linsdorf monster is a limestone sculpture of a large beast with its paws over two human heads. It is named for Linsdorf, in Alsace, where one (probably unreliable) provenance places its discovery. Though doubts exist about its authenticity, it is generally classified as a work of Iron Age Celtic sculpture, perhaps from the south of Gaul. It has been compared stylistically to the Tarasque of Noves.

== Provenance ==
The Linsdorf monster first came to the attention of archaeologists in 1984, when its owner attempted to export the statue to the United States. When papers provided were inadequate to identify the statue, the shipping agent agreed to bring it to the British Museum for identification. It was agreed there that (whatever it was) the statue had certainly only been in England for a short period, and therefore an export license could be provided. Ian Stead, then Deputy Keeper at the British Museum's Department of Prehistoric and Romano-British Antiquities, published a paper on the monster in order to "acquaint the archaeological world with a puzzling object."

The British intermediary who was attempting to export the statue claimed that it had been "discovered at the end of the [19th] century at Linsdorf, near Durmenach in Alsace". Archaeologists Gilles Langloys and Ian Armit are unconvinced by this provenance. The Carte archéologique de la Gaule records no such find in Alsace. The Parisian art dealer from whom the statue has been obtained (and whom, himself, bought it at auction in 1975) wrote in 1984 that "the place of discovery is unknown, but successive collections placed it in the south of France". (Note: Original French: "le lieu de la découverte est inconnu, mais les collections successives le situaient dans le Midi de la France".) When the export license was being considered, Stead's colleagues in continental Europe "confirmed that they had seen it in recent years" on the market there.

After the export license was approved, the Linsdorf monster was acquired by the Menil Foundation in Houston, Texas.

== Description ==
The statue is carved from dark grey oolitic limestone. It is 55cm tall. The statue stands on a flat base, 33cm deep and 30cm wide. The monster itself leans back dramatically, extending 8.5cm from the base. The back of the sculpture is largely uncarved. The back corner of the statue has been damaged.

The sculpture is of a seated monster (perhaps, as Stead suggests, a bear). It has four limbs. Under each of its (three-clawed) forepaws is a human head. The monster's mouth is open, its eyes are round and bulging, its nostrils are large and hollow. The ears are carved in the same plane as the head. The creature's maw has a row of pointed fangs, five on top and six on bottom. The creature is hairy, with deeply carved locks decorating its body and ridges decorating its forehead. The hair is interrupted on each side of its torso by carved ribs. A large, ovoid hole has been carved through the front of the creature's torso: 23cm tall and 17 cm wide. The heads under the creatures paw are not identical (one is 13cm tall whereas the other is 16cm), but are both hairless and have closed eyes. The larger head has a noticeably drooping mouth.

A powdery green dye is visible on the top of the monster's head, especially in the crevices of its hair. Susan La Niece identified this as barium sulfate for the British Museum. Stead suggests this residue is modern, but according to Alix Barbet (of the CNRS) nothing about this pigment is incompatible with a much earlier date.

== Interpretation ==
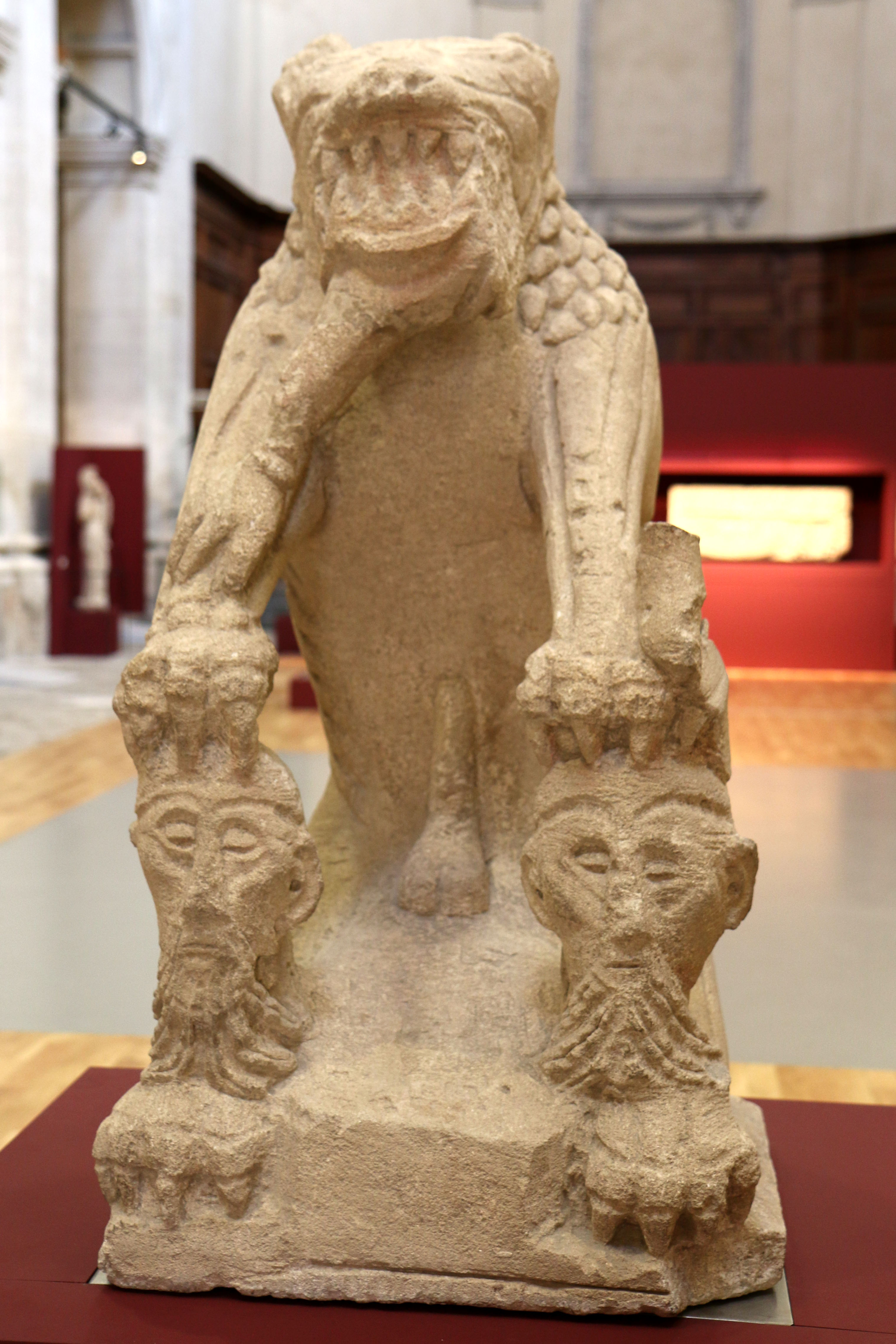
The Tarasque of Noves

When the statue first came to the attention of the British Museum it was thought that it might be Mayan or medieval, but these conjectures were not sustained by experts on those subjects. Stead communicated that "doubts remain about its authenticity", but that on stylistic grounds it had been classified at the British Museum as a work of Iron Age Celtic sculpture.

The strong resemblance of the statue to the Tarasque of Noves, a stone sculpture of a monster with severed heads found in France, has been noted. Armit calls it the Tarasque's "closest iconographic parallel". The Tarasque de Noves is, however, also poorly provenanced and uncertainly dated, though it is thought to have been found in the 19th century near Noves (in the south of France) and is classified (except by some dissenters, such as Alain Duval and Danielle Heude) as Iron Age Celtic.

The stone has been interpreted by Stead, Armit, and Langloys with reference the widespread Celtic cult of the severed head. Stead has suggested that the open hole between the two carved heads was intended for the insertion of a real human head. Sanctuaries from the southern Gaul, such as Roquepertuse, are known to have had niches cut for skulls. This somewhat corroborates the attribution of the find to the south of France.

Archaeologist Susan Walker has conjectured that the stone represents the influence of Roman funerary traditions on native Celtic sculpture, suggesting that the heads "may represent men in the hours following death".
