= Tarasque of Noves =

Celtic Iron Age statue

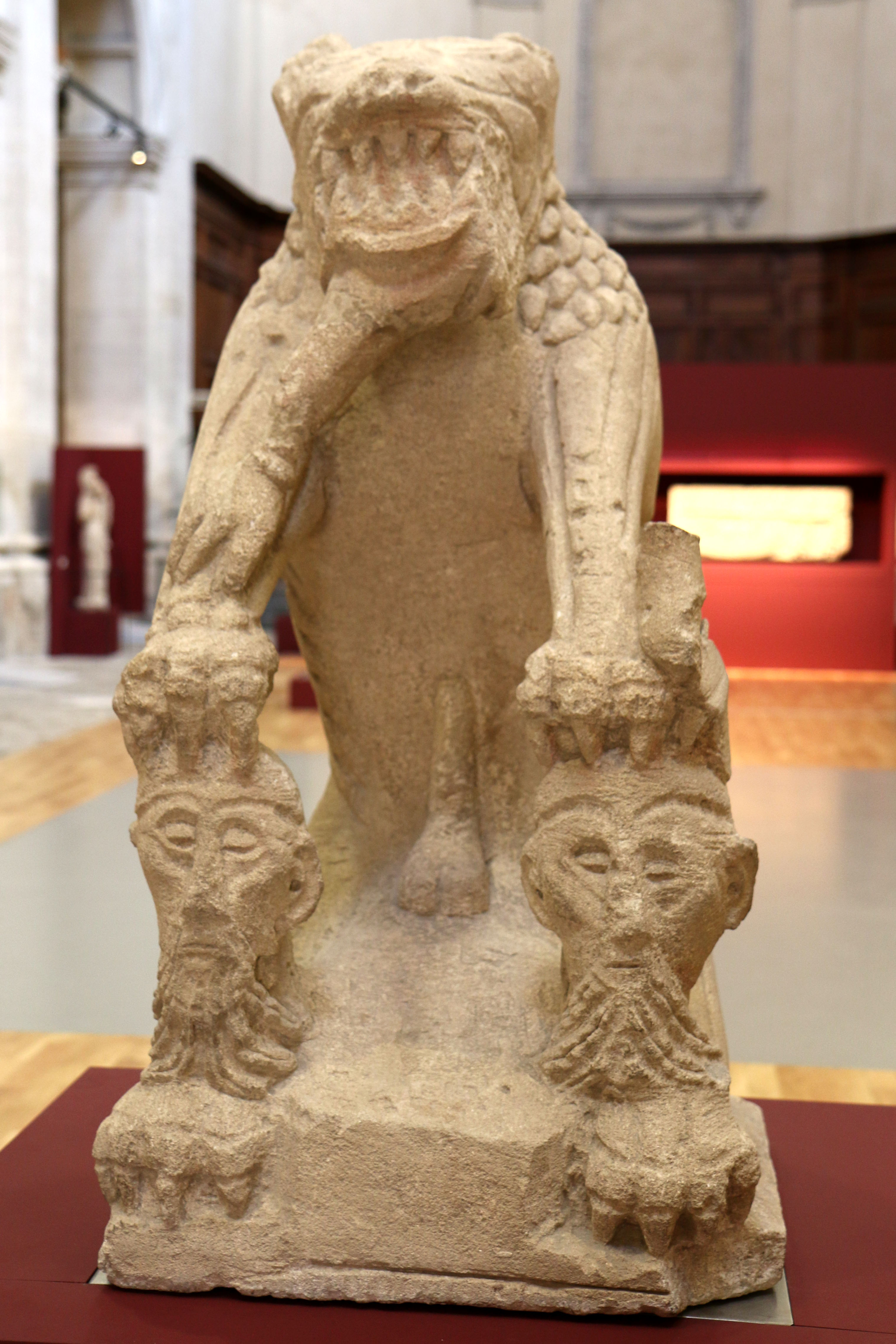
The Tarasque of Noves.

The Tarasque of Noves is a Celtic statue of a seated monster with its paws over two human heads. Found in the 19th century, the statue itself has been dated to between the 3rd and 1st centuries BCE. It was deposited in the 1st century BCE, not far from Noves, Bouches-du-Rhône. The meaning and function of the statue (as well as the nature of the monster) are unknown, but it has been conjectured that the niche in its torso was intended to hold a severed human head.

== Discovery ==
Though all provenances are in agreement that the statue was found near Noves, the precise circumstances of its discovery are murky. Jean-Baptiste Michel wrote in 1889 that the statue was discovered in 1849 at a depth of 2.5m in a pile of ancient pottery ("poteries antiques") near Noves. On the contrary, Isidor Gilles reported in 1896-98 that the statue was found in 1826 at a depth of 1m among Celtic, Greek, and Roman pottery ("poteries celtiques, grecques et romaines") about 500m from the château de Noves.

The area around Noves is known to have had a long-standing Iron Age and Gallo-Roman settlement.

The Tarasque was acquired in 1849 for the Musée Calvet in Avignon.

== Description ==
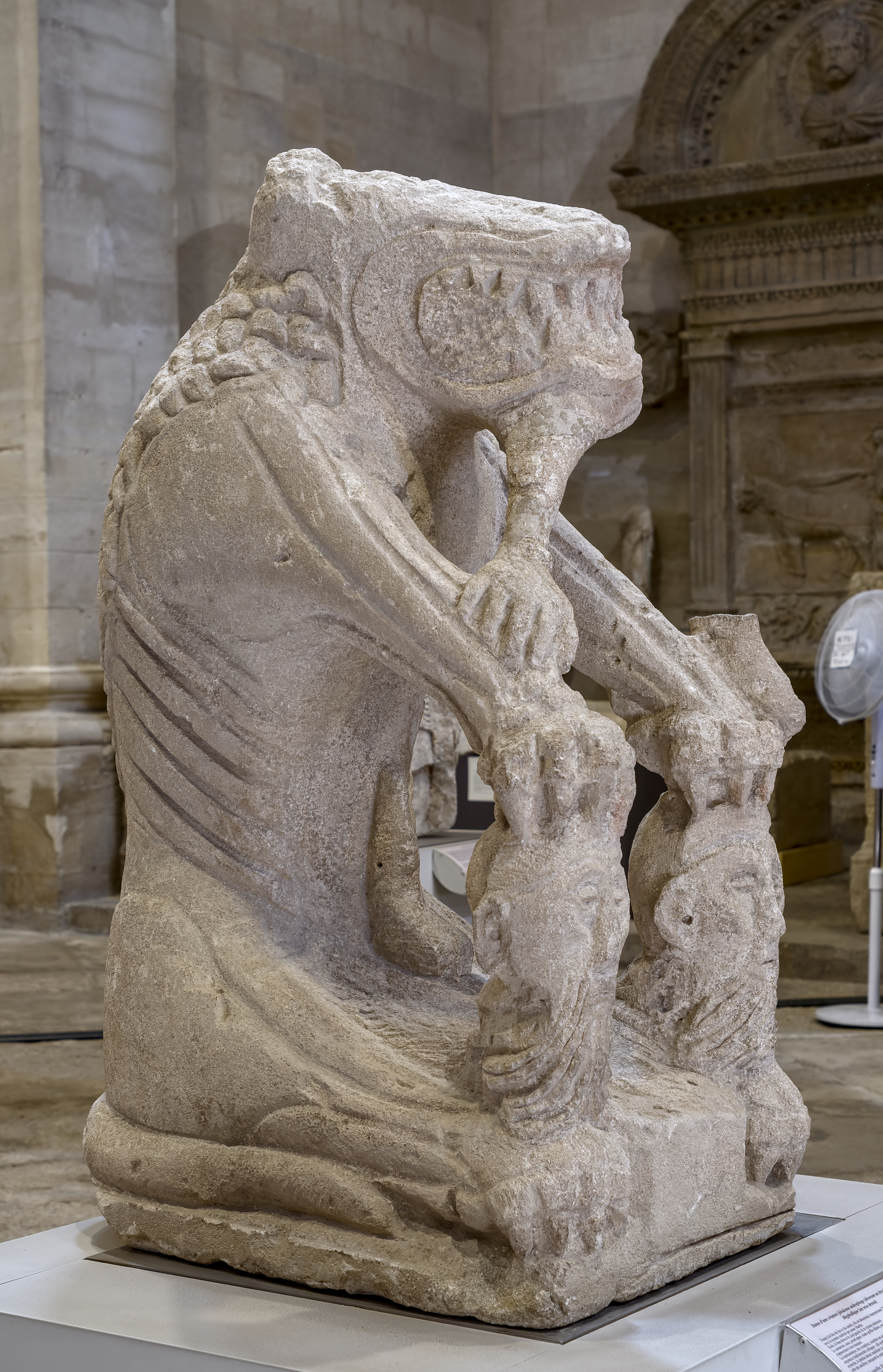
The Tarasque of Noves in profile.

The statue is 1.12m tall and made of limestone. The limestone is local, quarried not far from the statue's findspot.

The statue is of four-legged creature, sat upright on a pedestal. The figure's hind legs rest in an indent to the pedestal. Its penis is large and erect. The back is carved with scales, which ride up around the neck onto sides of the creature's head. On both sides of its torso, ridges give the impression of visible ribs. The forelegs have carved ridges to represent the creature's musculature. Two human heads (each about 30cm tall) are held between the creature's hind and its front paws. The heads have curly, prominent beards and moustaches; closed eyes; and straight (slightly downturned) mouths.

The creature's head is long and broad, but rather low. Its ears are small and its eyes are barely visible. Its mouth is large and open, baring its fangs. A braceleted human arm hangs between the creature's jaw and its right foreleg. The left and right side of the creature's mouth bear identical damage. Fernand Benoit has suggested that a human head and leg originally hung out of the creature's mouth, alongside the arm.

== Dating ==
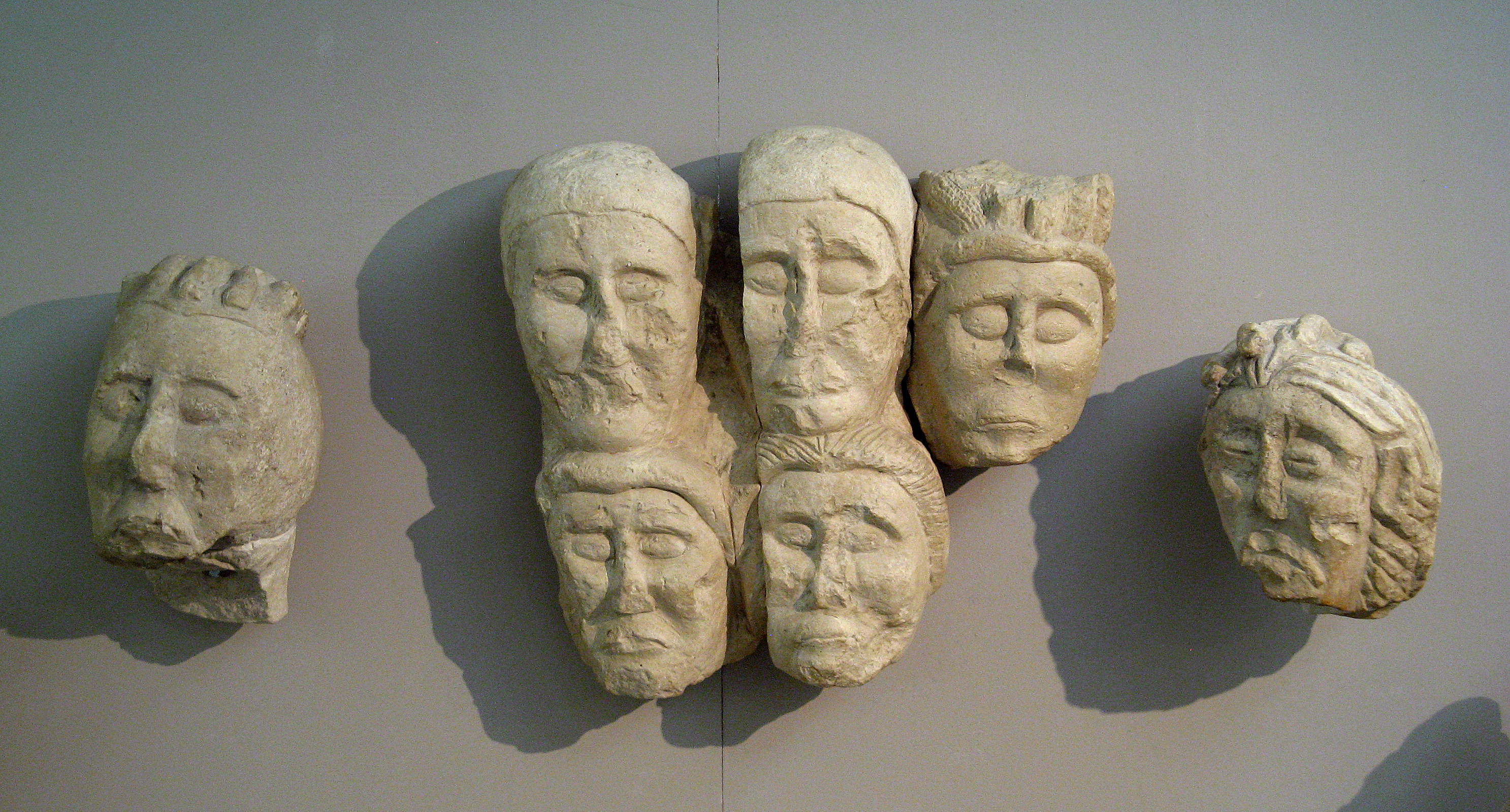
Sculpted heads from Entremont.

The statue is a peculiar piece, with few analogues, and therefore not easy to date. It is generally (but not unanimously) identified as a piece of Iron Age Celtic sculpture. The rendering of the human heads is very characteristic of this period. Dissenters from this view include Joseph Déchelette, who identified the piece as medieval, and Alain Duval and Danielle Heude, who speculate that it is a work of the early Romanesque. The Linsdorf monster, a statue of a bear-like monster with its paws on two severed heads, is by far the Tarasque's closest iconographic parallel. However, the Linsdorf monster is poorly provenanced (first coming to academic attention in 1980 with a provenance placing it in the south of France) and uncertainly dated (probably Iron Age Celtic, though doubts have been cast on its authenticity). The Tarasque is not likely to be a fake given its early date of discovery and the (securely authentic) iconographic parallels that have been discovered since, such as the sculpture from the oppidum of Entremont.

Among those who identify it as Iron Age, the statue has been assigned dates between the 1st and 3rd centuries BCE. Roland and Olivier Coignard have noted a distinct similarity between the beards on the Tarasque's human heads and the manes on the horse statues of Entremont, so similar that they were perhaps carved by the same sculptors. The statues at Entremont have been dated to the end of the 3rd century BCE, which is a plausible date for the Tarasque. If the pottery around the statue was Roman, the statue would have been deposited around 100-50 BCE, not long after the Roman occupation of Provence.

== Interpretation ==
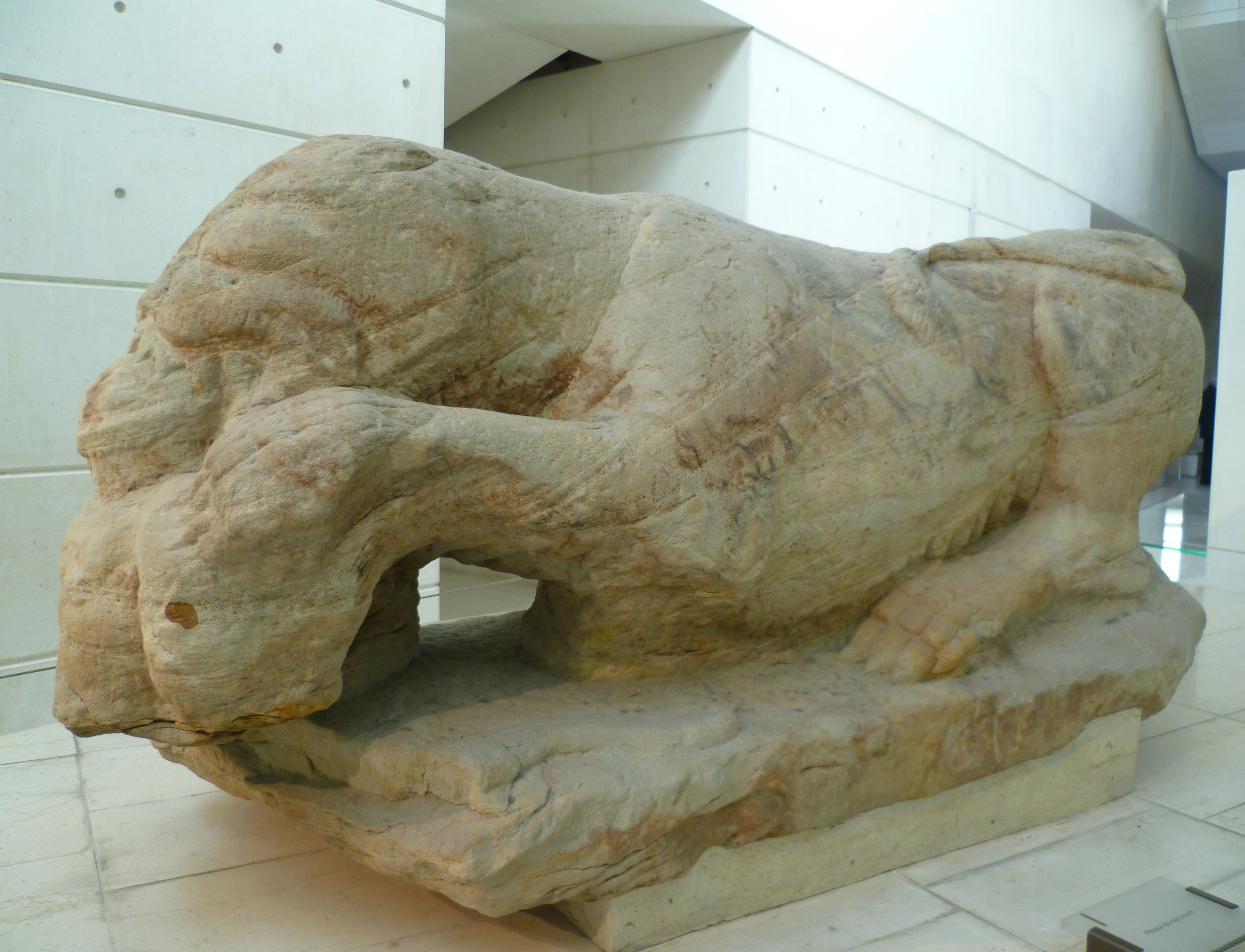
The Cramond Lioness devouring a bound male.

The monster, which Megaw described as a "great ithyphallic carnivore", has been identified as a lion, a wolf, a bear, or some unidentifiable mythological creature. The sculpture's anachronistic name refers to the Tarasque, a man-eating dragon of medieval French legend. The motif of carnivore devouring human is an influential one in both native Celtic and broader Mediterranean traditions. It is ubiquitous in Roman and Etruscan art. Life-sized lions clasping human heads are known from Iron Age sites in France and Iberia. A 2nd or 3rd century AD Romano-British sculpture (the Cramond Lioness) of a lioness devouring a male prisoner attests to this motif's longevity. The anthropomorphism of the Noves monster, however, is a characteristic without easy parallels among these examples. For the Romans, the carnivore devouring human motif expressed the triumph of death over human life, which is perhaps what is meant here, however Ian Armit has interpreted the statue as an expression of Saluvian political identity.

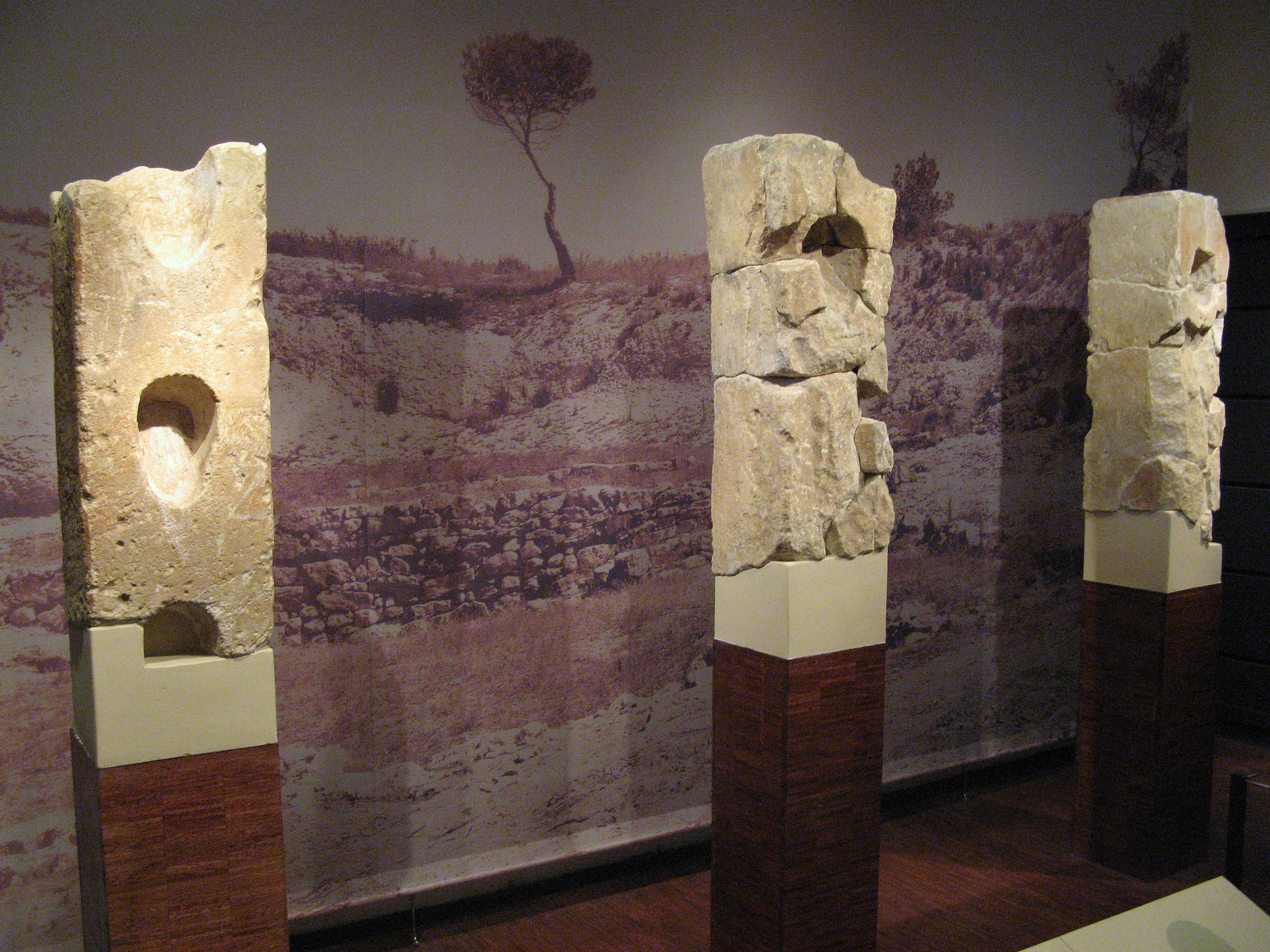
Pillars with recesses for human skulls from Roquepertuse.

We have no evidence as to the statue's original use. Patrice Arcelin has conjectured that it featured in a Celtic necropolis. The human heads show the influence of the Celtic cult of the human head (which had an especial obsession with severed heads). It has been noted that the niche in front of the phallus and between the two heads is the right size to fit a human head. The Linsdorf monster has an oval hole in its torso which has been similarly conjectured to hold a human head. Sanctuaries from the south of Gaul, such as Roquepertuse, had niches carved in them for human heads. Coignard and Coignard note that when a human skull is placed in this niche, the monster's penis is just visible, rising over the skull.
