= Conrad Mouren =

Secretary of Municipality of Tarascon

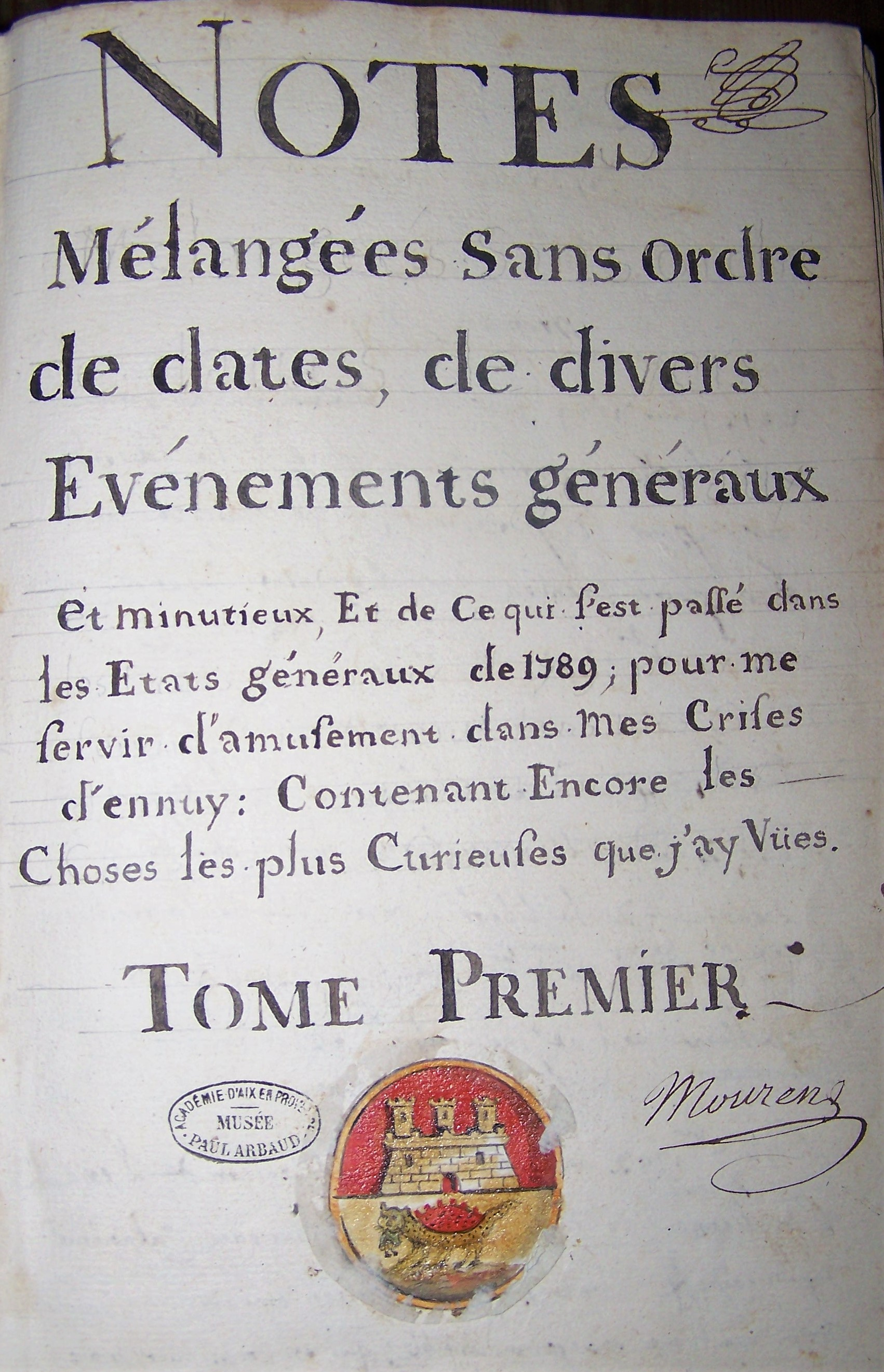
First volume of Conrad Mouren's manuscripts.

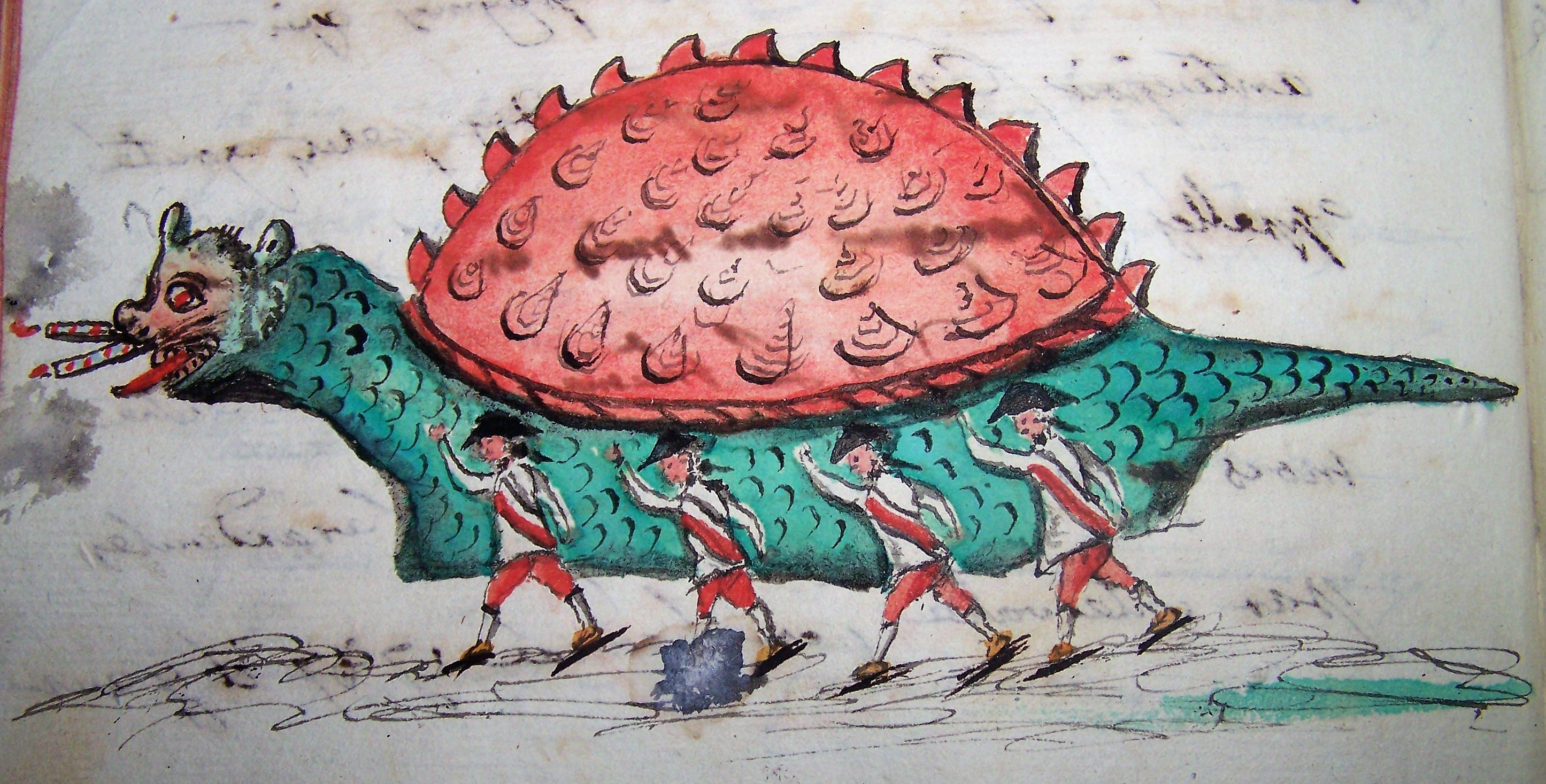
Drawing of Tarasque festival in Tarascon, by Conrad Mouren.

Esprit-Conrad Mouren (1731-1795) was a secretary of the Municipality of Tarascon who wrote nine manuscripts during the French Revolution.

Conrad Mouren was part of a family of notaries, originally from Marseille, which had settled in Tarascon during the second half of the 16th century. He was secretary of the Municipality of Tarascon from 1773 to 1786. He was briefly incarcerated in Marseille in 1794.

== Works ==
Volumes 1-9:

- Volume 1 (197 pages): Notes mélangées sans ordre de dates, de divers événements généraux et minutieux, et de ce qui s'est passé dans les États-Généraux de 1789; pour me servir d'amusement dans mes crises d'ennuy : contenant encore les choses les plus curieuses que j'ay vues
- Volume 2 (200 pages): Notes mélangées sans ordre de dates, de divers événements généraux et minutieux; et la continuation des États-Généraux
- Volume 3 (198 pages): Notes mélangées sans ordre de dates, de divers événements généraux et minutieux; et la continuation des États-Généraux
- Volume 4 (274 pages): Notes mélangées sans ordre de dates, de divers événements généraux et minutieux; et la continuation des États-Généraux
- Volume 5 (333 pages): Notes mélangées sans ordre de dates, de divers événements généraux et minutieux; et de ce qui s'est fait dans la seconde session de l'assemblée Nationale
- Volume 6 (190 pages): Notes mélangées sans ordre de dates, de divers événements généraux et minutieux, et de ce qui s'est fait dans la seconde session de l'assemblée Nationale, contenant encore les choses les plus curieuses que j’ay vues
- Volume 7 (294 pages): Notes mélangées sans ordre de dates, de divers événements généraux et minutieux, et de ce qui s'est passé dans la Convention nationale, contenant encore les choses les plus curieuses que j'ay vues
- Volume 8 (286 pages): Notes mélangées sans ordre de dates, de divers événements généraux et minutieux, contenant le jugement et la mort de Louis XVI et de ce qui s'est passé dans la Convention nationale, contenant encore les choses les plus curieuses que j'ay vues
- Volume 9 (447 pages): Notes mélangées sans ordre de dates, de divers événements généraux et minutieux, et de ce qui s'est passé dans la Convention nationale, contenant encore les choses les plus curieuses que j'ay vues
