= Linsdorf =

Commune in Grand Est, France

- Commune
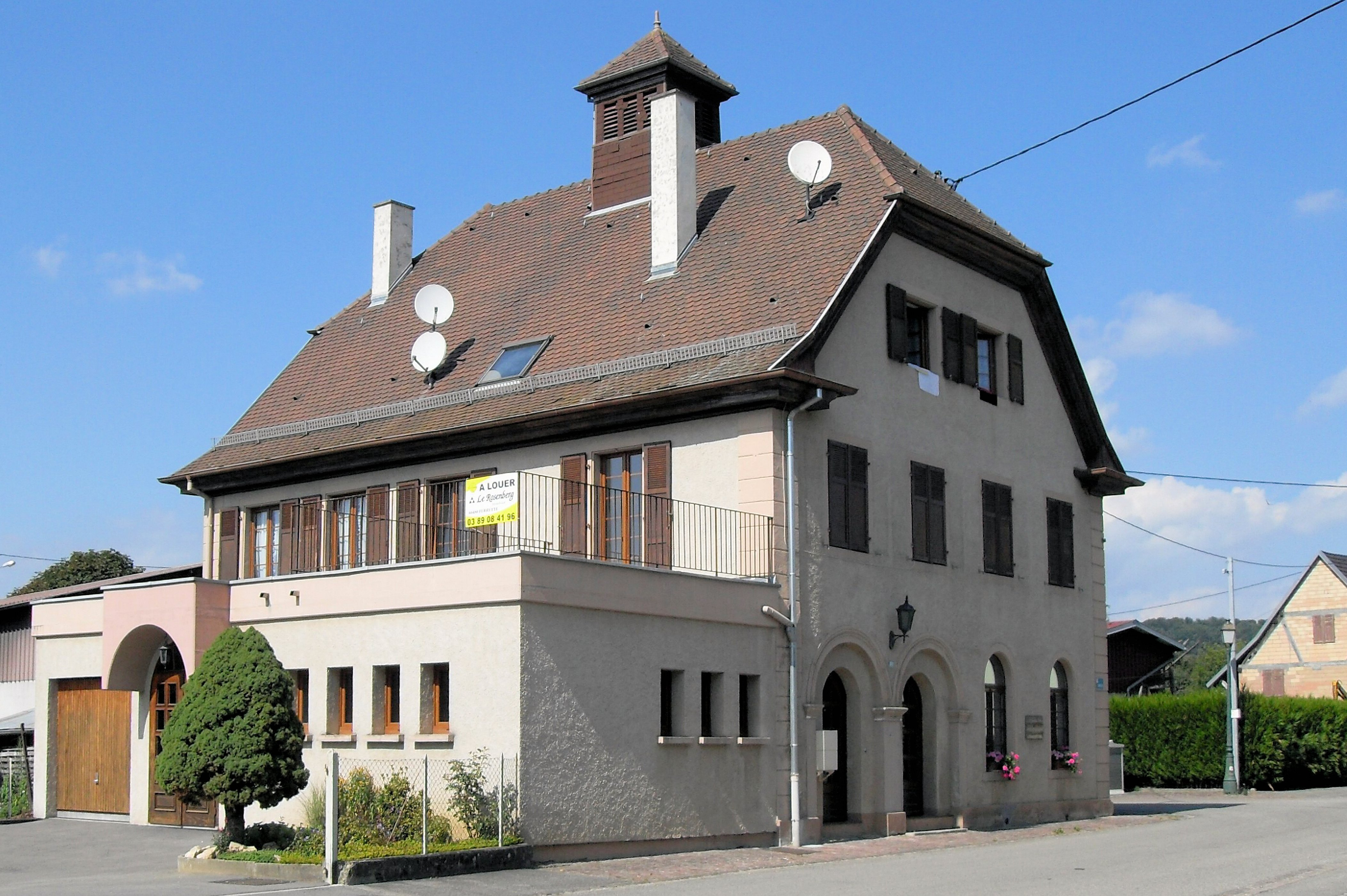
- The village hall in Linsdorf

- Coat of arms
- Location of Linsdorf
- Location within France Location within Grand Est
- Coordinates: 47°30′21″N 7°23′52″E
- Country: France
- Region: Grand Est
- Department: Haut-Rhin
- Arrondissement: Altkirch
- Canton: Altkirch

Government
  - Mayor (2020–2026): Serge Gaisser
- Area^{1}: 3.36 km^{2} (1.30 sq mi)
- Elevation: 400 m (1,300 ft)
- Highest elevation: 498 m (1,634 ft)
- Lowest elevation: 387 m (1,270 ft)
- Population (2023): 334
  - Density: 99.4/km^{2} (257/sq mi)
- Time zone: UTC+01:00 (CET)
  - Summer (DST): UTC+02:00 (CEST)
- INSEE/Postal code: 68187 /68480
- ^{1} French Land Register data, which excludes lakes, ponds, glaciers > 1 km^{2} (0.386 sq mi or 247 acres) and river estuaries.

Linsdorf (French pronunciation: [linsdɔʁf]) is a commune in the Haut-Rhin department in Alsace in north-eastern France.

== See also ==
- Communes of the Haut-Rhin département
- Linsdorf monster
