= Christophe de Villeneuve-Bargemon =

French aristocrat and civil servant

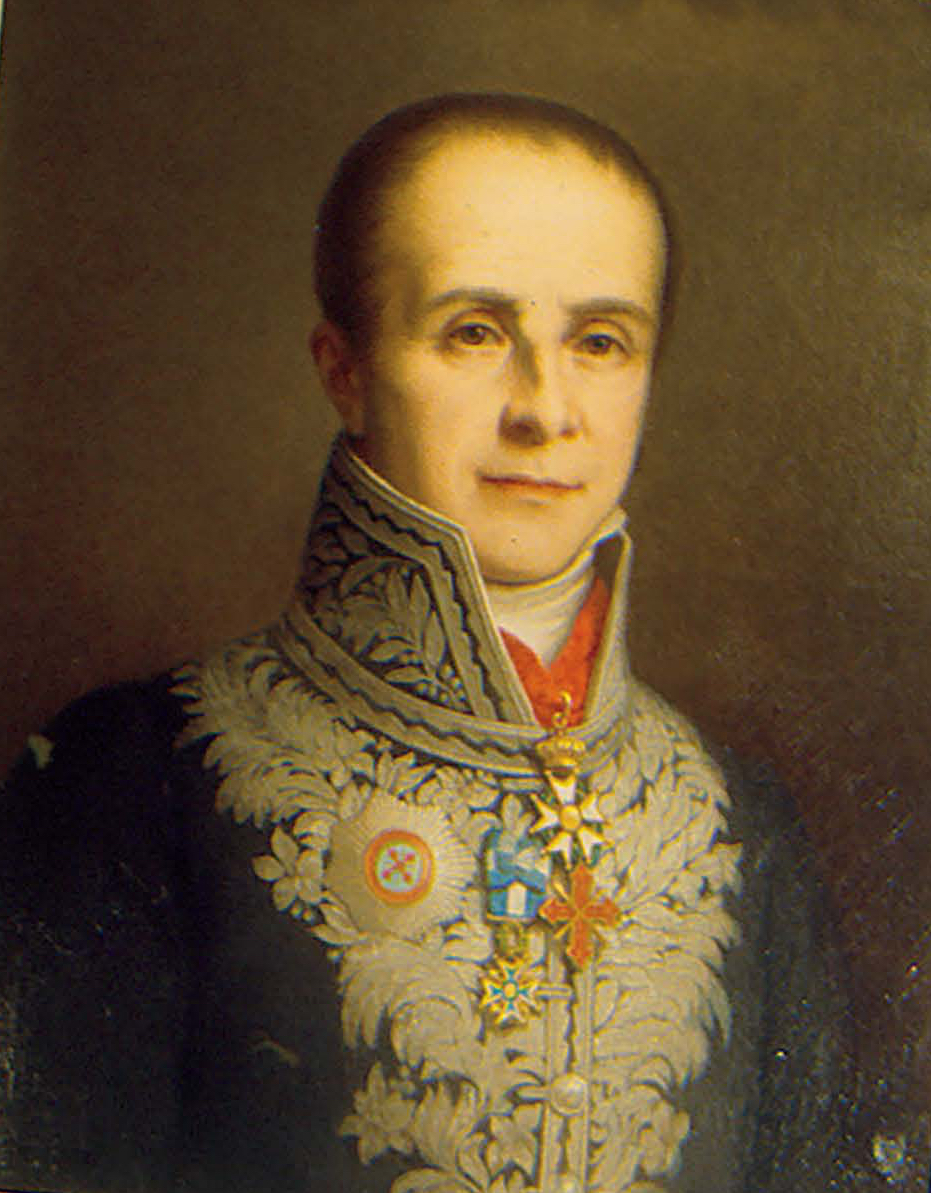
Christophe de Villeneuve-Bargemon

Count Christophe de Villeneuve-Bargemon (1771–1829) was a French aristocrat and civil servant.

He was born into an aristocratic family of Spanish origin, on June 27, 1777, in Bargemon, Provence.

De Villeneuve-Bargemon was appointed Prefect of Lot-et-Garonne in 1806, and in 1816, Prefect of Bouches-du-Rhône. In this capacity, he commissioned the Porte d'Aix in Marseille.

He died on October 13, 1829, and The Espace Villeneuve Bargemon conference centre in Marseille is named after him.

== Bibliography ==
- Statistique du département des Bouches-du-Rhône
