= Roquepertuse =

Human settlement

Coordinates: 43.5328°N 5.2715°E

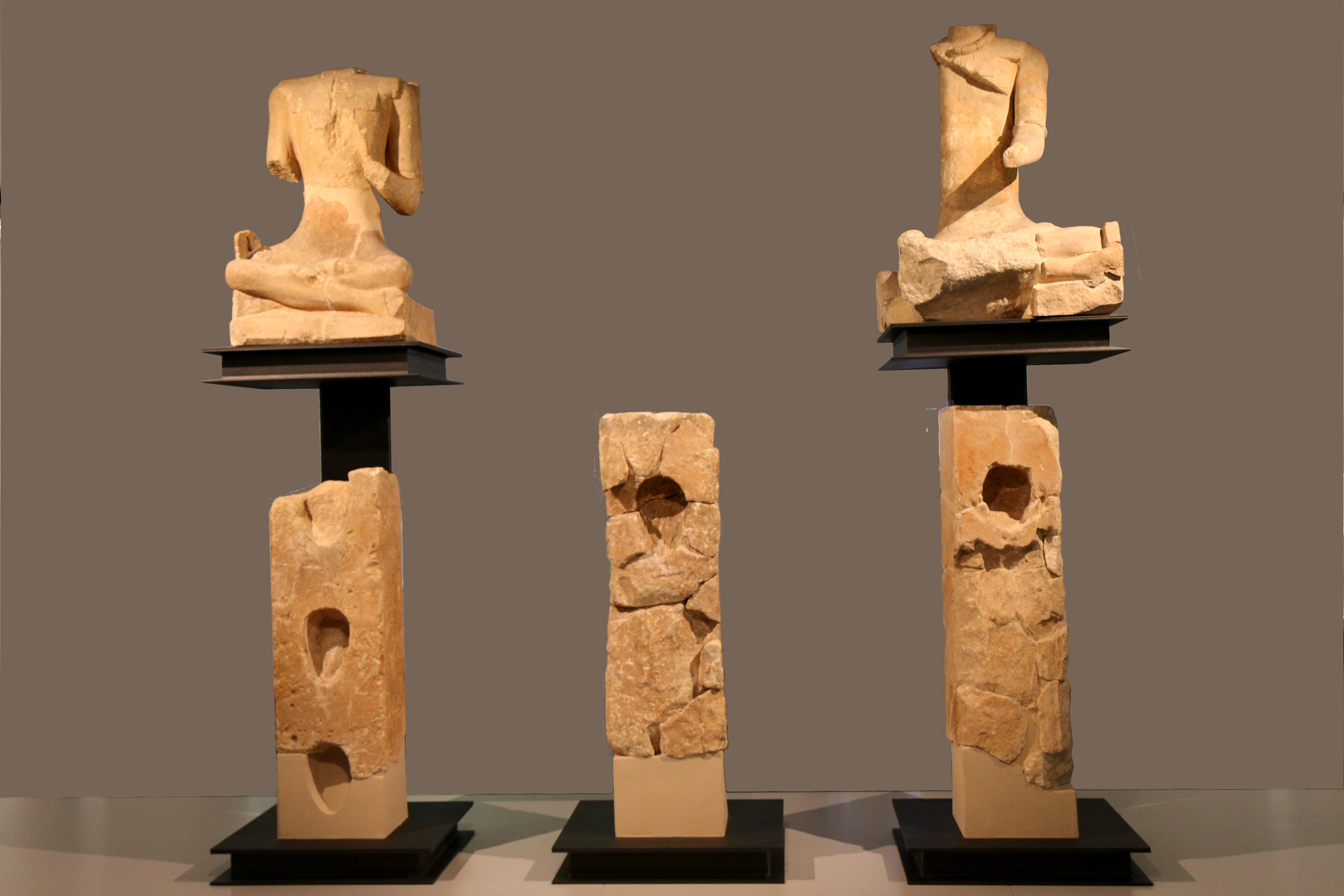
Roquepertuse. The pillars of the portico, with cavities designed for receiving skulls. III-II B.C. Musée d'archéologie méditerranéenne in Marseille.

Acropolis Roquepertuse is an ancient Celtic religious center. It is located near the city of Velaux, north of Marseille 16 miles west of Aix-en-Provence, in the Provence-Alpes-Côte d'Azur region of southern France. The site was first recorded in the Bouches-du-Rhône civil statistics in 1824 when a partially buried statue of a cross-legged warrior was discovered in the garden of the parish priest. The structure was destroyed by the Romans in 124 BC and re-discovered in 1860 when a partially uncovered statue was fully excavated. Most of the excavations were done in 1923 by Henri de Gérin-Ricard.

== Excavations ==
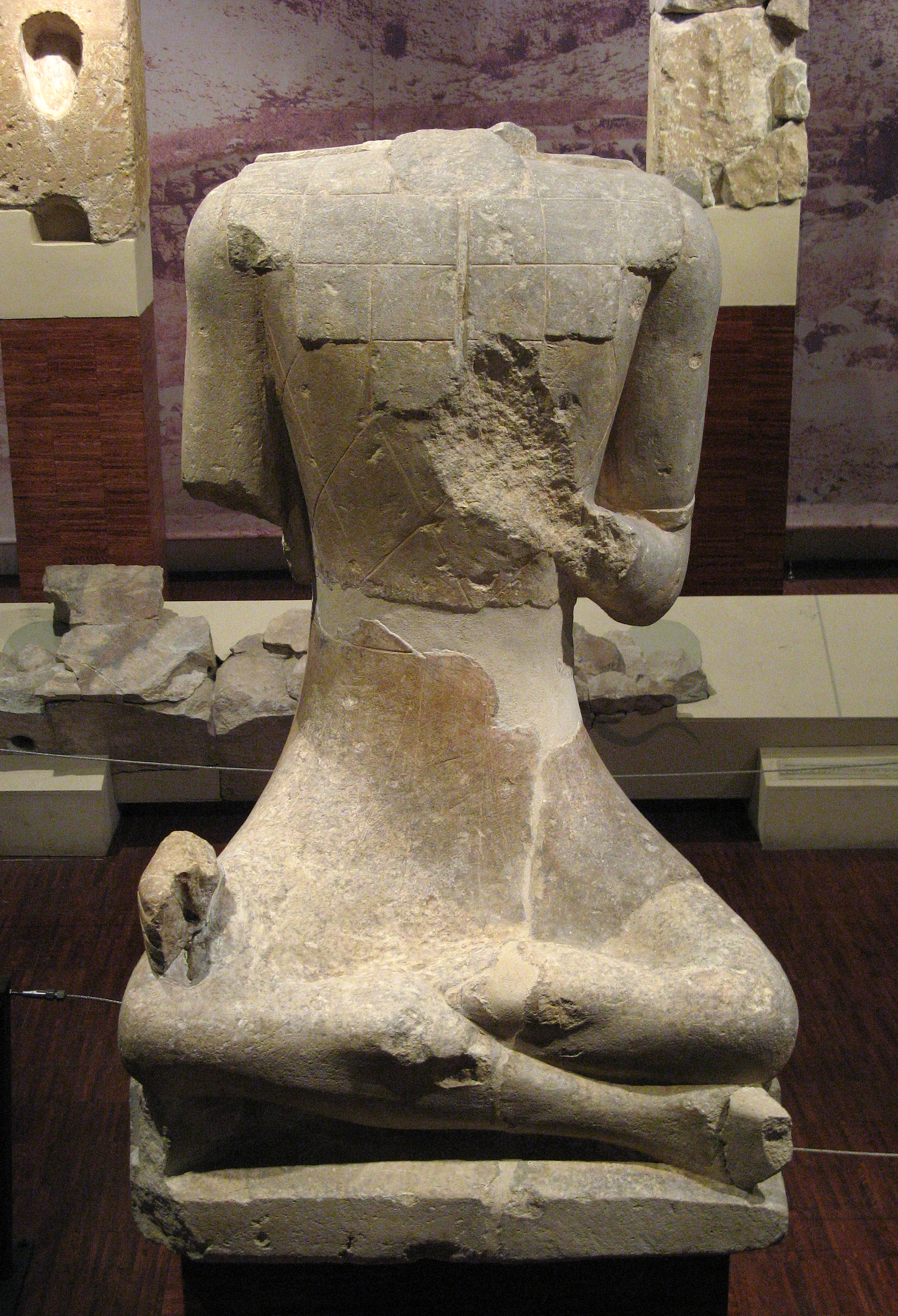
Seated warrior from Roquepertuse

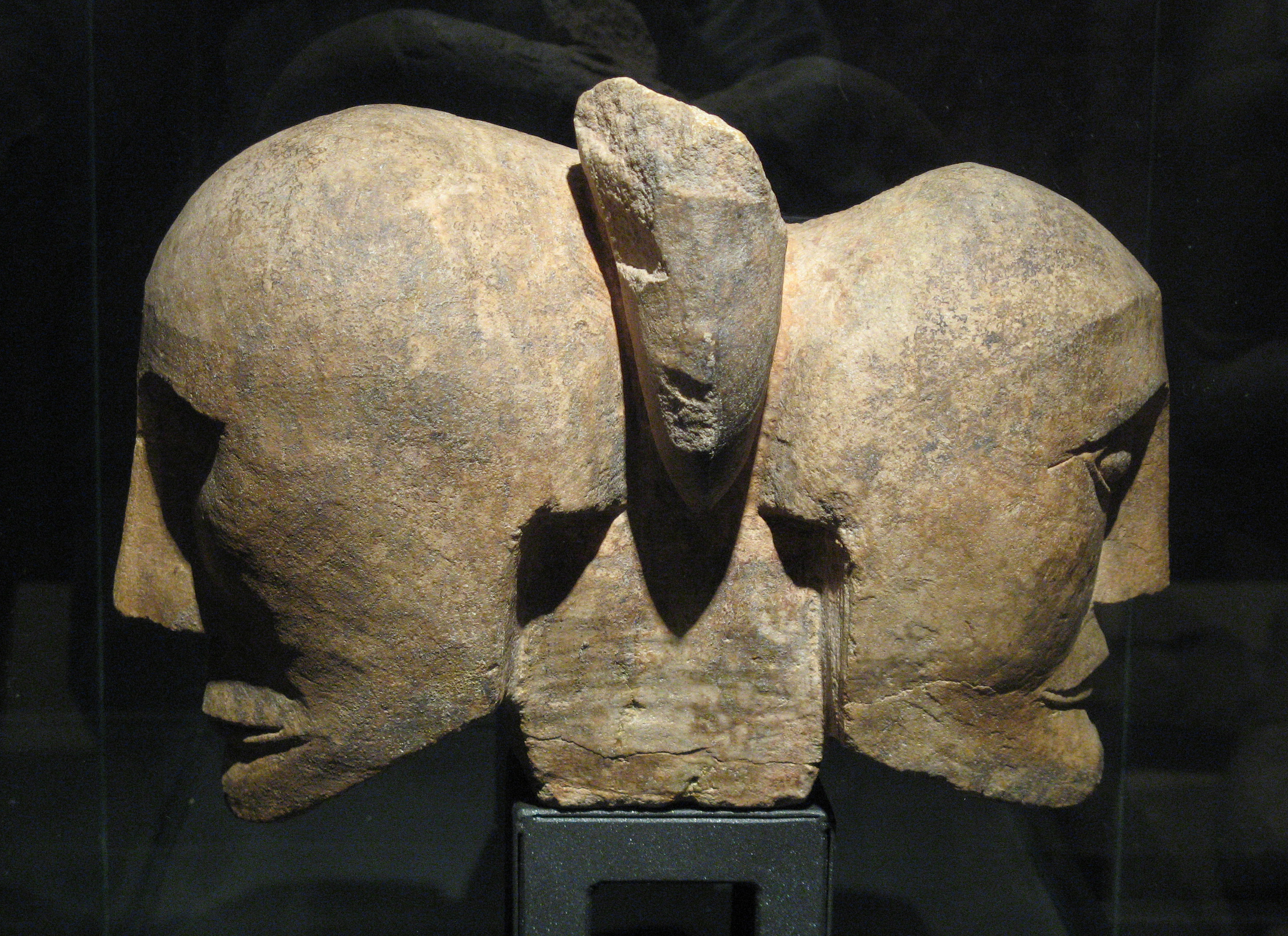
Three-headed sculpture from Roquepertuse

The accidental discovery of the first sculptures in the 19th century triggered the first excavation of the site by Count Henry de Gérin-Ricard. A series of excavations then took place over the next ten years, from 1917 to 1927, and brought to light structures identified as a sanctuary attributed to the Celto-Ligures, initially dated to just before the Roman conquest.

Officially, the relics have now been dated to the 3rd century BC, based on Celtic expansion into the area at the time. However, the clothing and gestures of certain statues found at the site suggest that they date from the 5th or 6th century BC. These statues are distinguished by their cross-legged seated position.

A platform of 50 m by 22 m paved with flat stones including a couple of reused headstones, was discovered, divided in the middle by a staircase made of large blocks of stone. Stone walls to the left and to the right of the stairs formed a terrace, probably one of several which the complex originally had.

On the platform was what has variously been called a portal, door frame, and portico with pillars, carved of limestone. Its columns have cavities in which human stone masks, and human skulls, had been placed. Its lintel was carved with the heads of four horses, and additional decoration in paint. At the top of the lintel was a limestone statue of a bird of 60 cm by 60 cm which has been called a goose, but is now thought more likely to depict a raptor.

A two-faced androgynous sculpture of limestone (0.2 m high and 30 cm long) was also found, as well as two statues of figure sitting cross-legged(0.62 m high).

The first interpretation of archaeologists was that this was a secluded sanctuary. The latest findings from various multidisciplinary studies suggest that it was an agglomeration of about 0.5 hectares with a sanctuary to the north, as well as a bulwark for protection.

The site is important in part because it provides evidence for the Celtic head cult described in Greek and Roman accounts.

The site is near another Celtic-Roman site at Entremont, which had similar relief sculpture of severed human and horse heads, as well as skull niches carved into pillars. Nearby archaeological sites include several oppida from approximately the same period. Roquepertuse was declared a monument historique, or protected historical site, in 1967.

Roquepertuse had no domicile available for worshippers and has been used as a sanctuary where only priests may have lived permanently.

== Bibliography ==
- Le sanctuaire préromain de Roquepertuse à Velaux, by Henri de Gérin-Ricard (Marseille, 1929)
- Le sanctuaire préromain de Roquepertuse à Velaux (Bouches-du-Rhône) (The Pre-Roman Sanctuary of Roquepertuse in Velaux (Bouches-du-Rhône), Henri de Gérin-Ricard Marseille, Société de statistique d'histoire et d'archéologie de Marseille et de Provence, 1927
- Brigitte Lescure, 'Roquepertuse", in Voyage en Massalie: 100 ans d'archéologie en Gaule du Sud (Travel to Massalia: 100 Years of Archaeology in South Gaul), Marseille, Musées de Marseille/Édisud, 1990 (ISBN 2-85744-496-6), p. 165-171
- L'art primitif méditerranéen de la vallée du Rhone (Primitive Mediterranean Art of the Rhone Valley), by Fernand_Benoit (1955)
- Art et dieux de la Gaule (Art and Gods of Gaul), by Fernand Benoit (1969) (in English)
- "The Celtic Realms: The History and the Culture of the Celtic Peoples from Pre-History to the Norman Invasion", by Myles Dillon & Nora Chadwick (1967), pages 294-297.
