= Constant Roux =

French sculptor

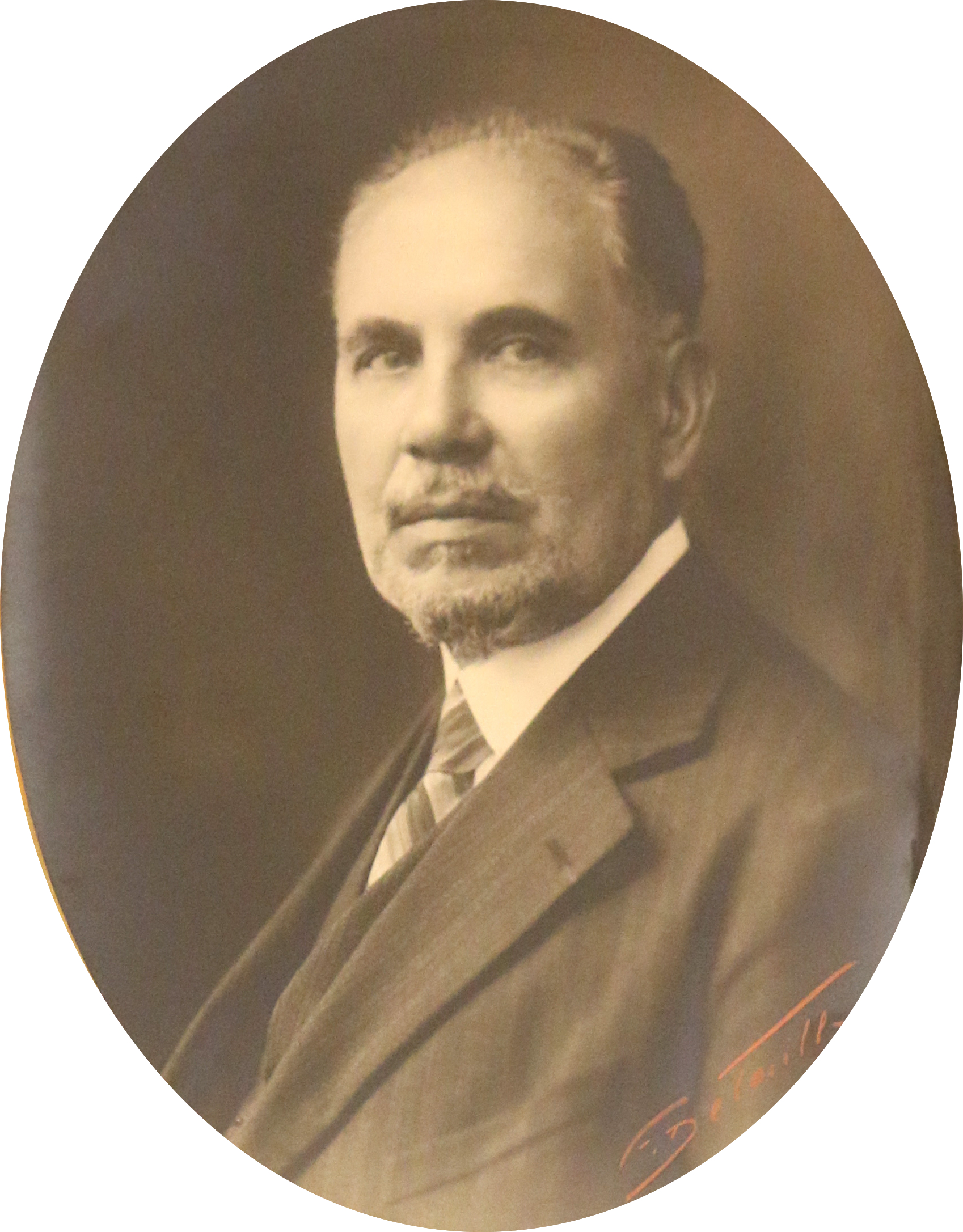
- Born: 20 April 1865; Marseille, Bouches-du-Rhône, France
- Died: 17 November 1942 (aged 77); Marseille, Bouches-du-Rhône, France
- Occupation: Sculptor

Constant Ambroise Roux (20 April 1865, Marseille - 17 November 1942, Marseille) was a French sculptor.

== Biography ==
Roux' parents ran a chemist shop and Roux started working at a young age for Achille Blanqui, who was a furniture maker. Roux helped with the wood carving involved.

Roux studied at the École supérieure des Beaux-Arts of Marseille, enrolling in 1879, and working under the tutelage of Émile Aldebert, Marius Guindon and Théodore Jourdan, and was subsequently admitted to the École nationale supérieure des Beaux-Arts in Paris, studying under Jules Coutan, Jules Cavelier and Louis-Ernest Barrias. In 1894 he won the Prix de Rome for sculpture with the ronde-bosse ""Enflammé de colère, Achille revêtant après la mort de Patrocle, l'armure apportée par Thétis, sa mère" and winning this prestigious prize meant that he was able to study in Rome from 1895 to 1898 at the Villa Medici.

In 1898, Roux submitted the work "Pourquoi naître esclave" (Why be Born a Slave?) to the Salon des Artistes Français, sending it from Rome, and it was awarded a bronze medal. In 1900 he submitted the composition "L'amour au guet" (Love on the Lookout) to the Exposition Universelle, again winning the bronze. 1910 saw his work for the façade of the Institut de Paléontologie Humaine in Paris and for his work "Nicolas Poussin" submitted to the Salon in that year he was awarded a gold medal. After the war he was commissioned to work on various war memorials. He died in Marseille in 1942.

Where ever possible Roux supported art in his native city of Marseille participating for example with Émile Aldebert, André-Joseph Allar, François Carli, Stanislas Clastrier, Charles Delanglade, Jean-Baptiste Hugues, Marius Malan and the painter Pauline Mace, in supporting the Marseille Salon des Indépendants in 1913 and 1914. He also founded the Galerie Caors-Cottier in 1922 and participated in the Provence Exposition de l'Académie Régionale des Peintres et Sculpteurs held at the Galerie Détaille. His work was part of the sculpture event in the art competition at the 1928 Summer Olympics. From 1931 he served regularly on the jury of the École des Beaux Arts of Marseille together with Charles Delanglade, Louis Botinelly, Paul Gondard, Marius Malan, José Silbert and David Dellepiane. Marseille showed their appreciation when he was elected to the Académie Marseille.

=== Main works ===
1. Institut de paléontologie Humaine frieze.Paris. A frieze comprising twenty bas-reliefs on the theme of "L’Homme primitif" were created by Roux for the façade of the Institut of human paleontology in Paris. Photographs of some of these remarkable bas-reliefs are shown below.

== Images of Institut de paléontologie humaine frieze ==
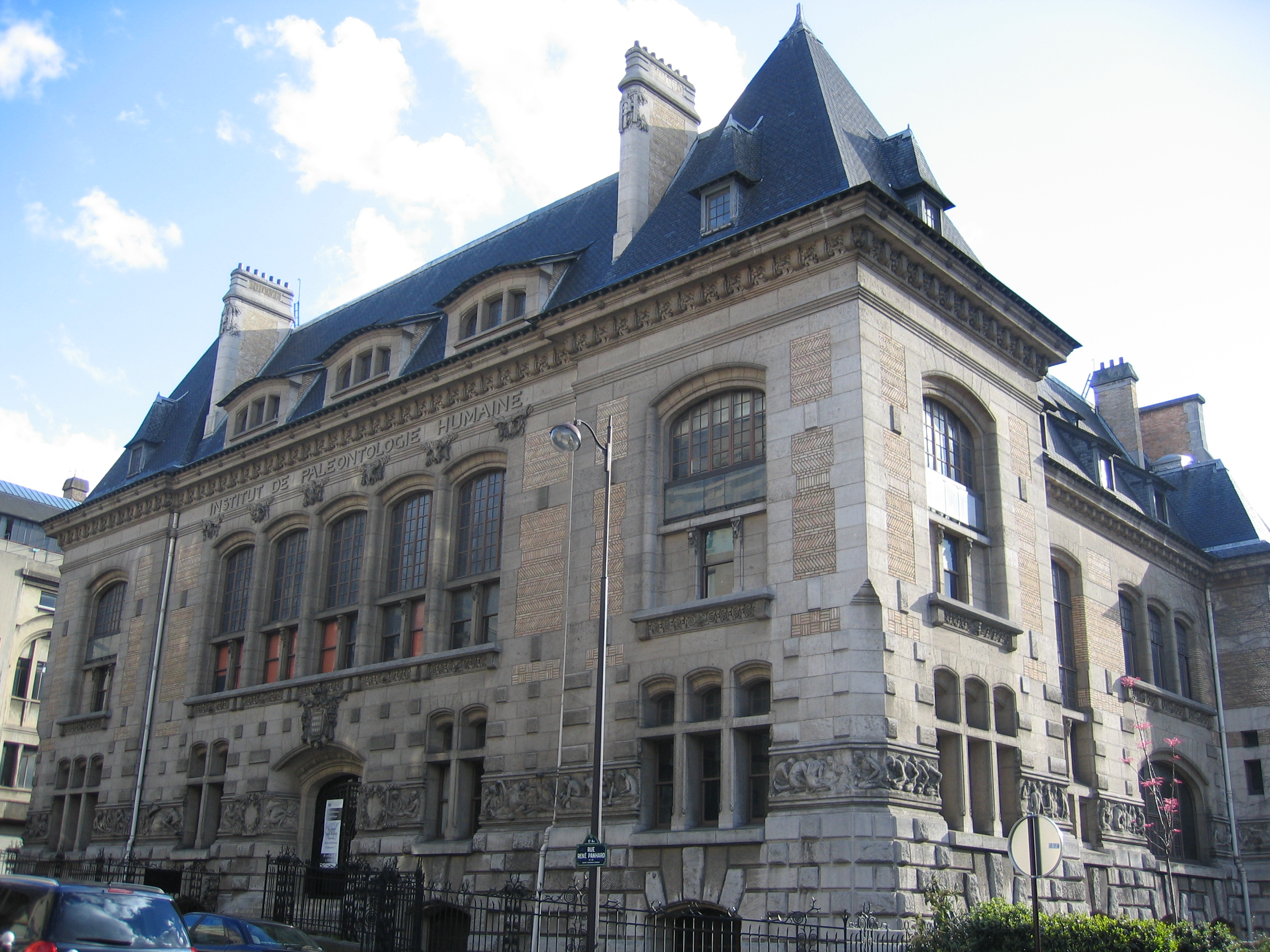
View of the Institut de paléontologie Humaine. Choux's frieze can be seen,

Part of the Choux frieze on Paris' Institut de paléontologie Humaine

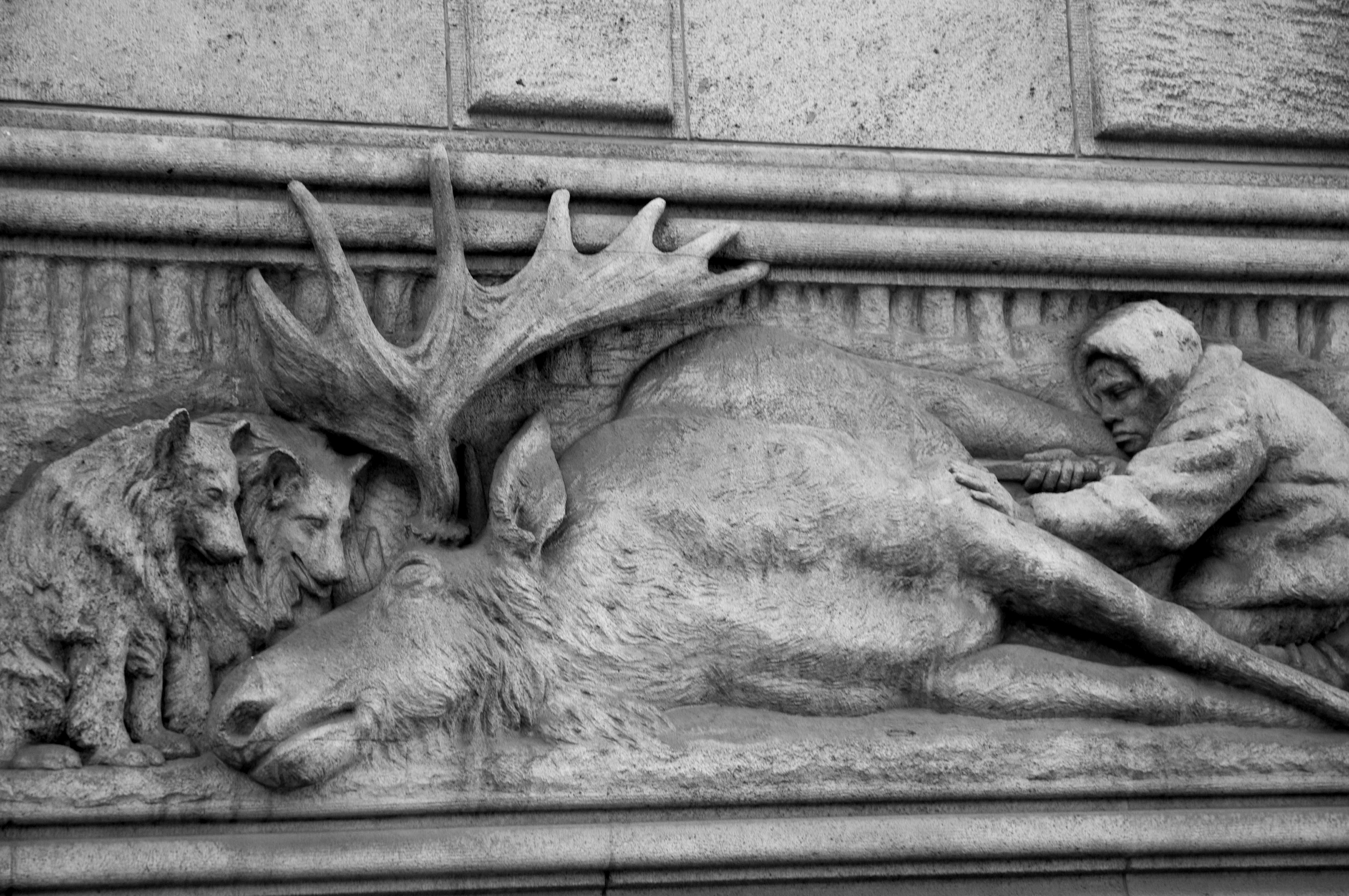
Part of the Choux frieze on Paris' Institut de paléontologie Humaine

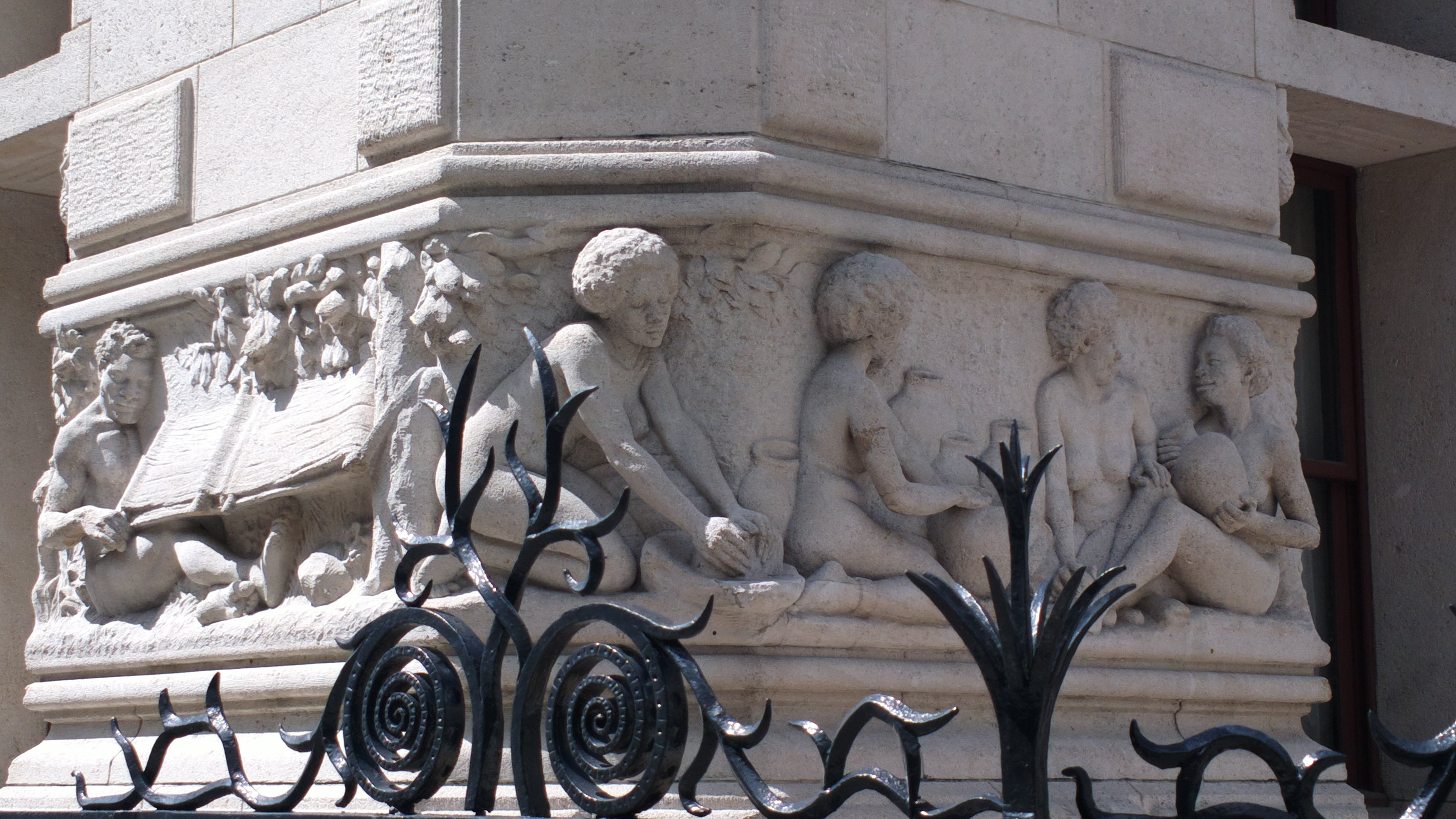
Part of the Choux frieze on Paris' Institut de paléontologie Humaine

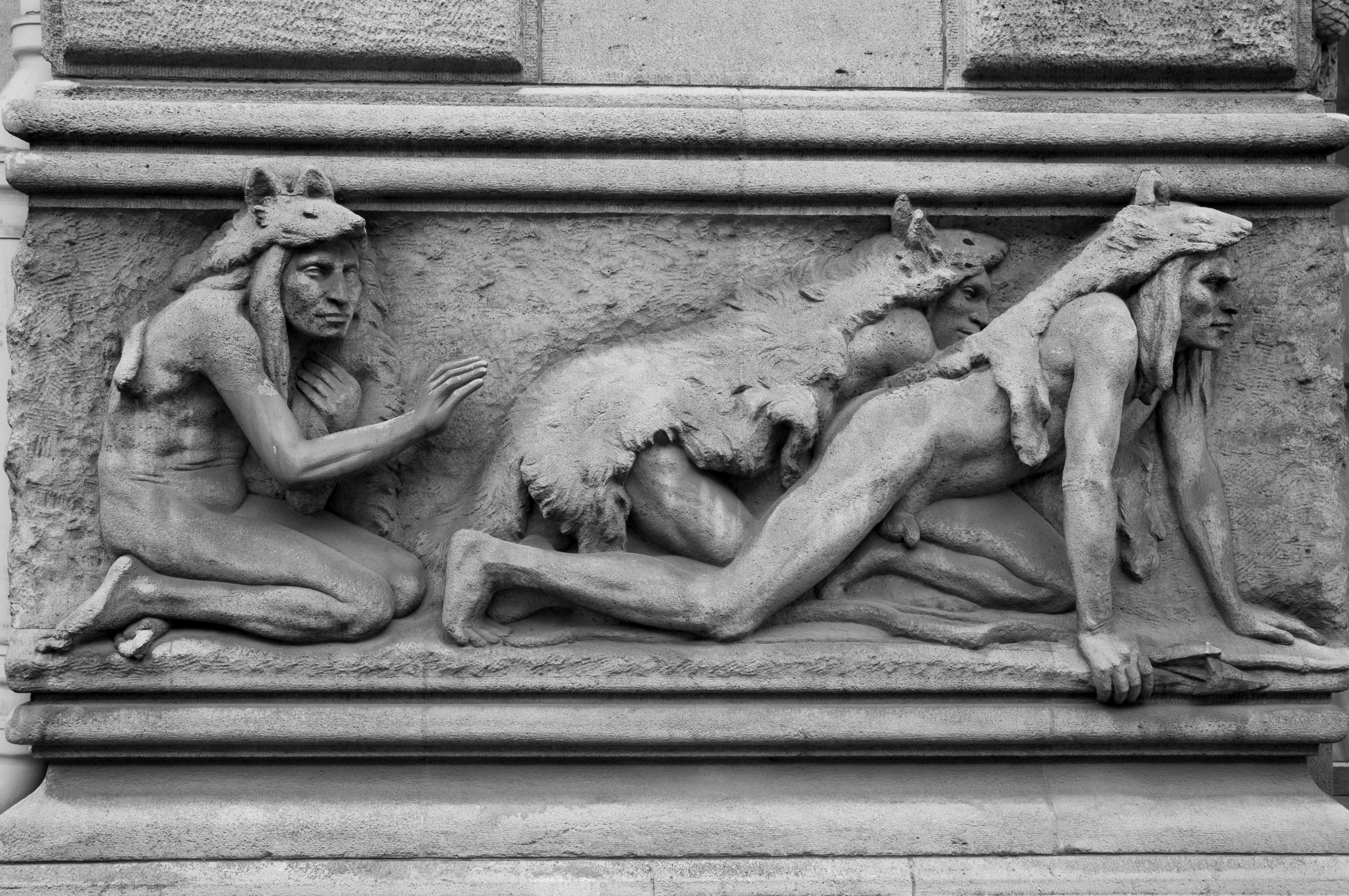
Part of the Choux frieze on Paris' Institut de paléontologie Humaine

2. The Salle des Quatre Colonnes in the Palais Bourbon now the Assemblée nationale. On a wall in this room, and facing Armand Martial's marble sculpture "La République", a marble plaque lists the names of the deputies who gave their lives for France in the 1914-1918 war. The plaque is decorated by Roux's carvings of a gallic cock, the hand of justice, a bundle of lances and a sword with garlands of oak leaves. Also, and on 8 June 1900, Roux was commissioned to create two decorative bas-relief panels for the refreshment room ("Buvette") of the National Assembly, and his compositions entitled "L’Automne" and "L’Hiver" were produced in grey ceramic by Sèvres. Roux submitted the bas-reliefs to the 1902 Salon and they were awarded a medal (2nd class) and in 1903 two further panels were ordered, these entitled "L’eau" and "Le Feu". A second copy of "L’eau" was made by Sèvres in 1904 and this can be seen in "La Piscine" in Roubaix, where an old public swimming bath has imaginatively been converted into an art gallery and museum. A photograph of this bas-relief is included in the gallery below.

3. "La République". Hôtel de préfecture des Bouches-du-Rhône. The statue in white marble by Roux entitled "la République" can be seen on the main staircase ("l'escalier d'honneur") of the Bouches-du-Rhône prefecture. It was inaugurated on 14 March 1904.

4. Statue Palais Princier on Le Rocher- "La science découvrant les merveilles de l'Océan"- This statue, standing outside the Palais Princier, was created in 1914 by Constant Roux in hommage to Prince Albert 1st of Monaco and to commemorate the 25th year of his reign.

5. 'The war memorial (monument aux morts) at Saint-Martin-de-Crau- Roux's sculpture of a dying French soldier defending the national flag stands on a pedestal. The monument is dedicated to those men killed in the 1914-1918 and 1939-1945 wars and all the victims of an explosion at a munitions depot in Beaussenq on 3 June 1918. 200 soldiers were killed in the explosion. Roux had exhibited the composition at the Salon des Artistes Français of 1920. It was destined for the commune of Trelly in la Manche and depicted a young soldier dying at the foot of a cross and pressing the national flag to his chest. This composition was used for Saint-Martin-de-Crau but without the cross. The same composition was used for the memorials in the Marseille's suburb of Saint-Loup and also for Nanton, Privas and Seillans.

6. Les convalescents rendant hommage à Louis Salvator -This statue by Roux depicts convalescing patients paying hommage to Louis Salvator and stands in the grounds of the Hôpital Salvator in Marseille. Roux won the competition to select the sculpture for the statue in 1908. See photograph in the gallery below.

7. Jean Bouin. Roux's bronze study of the athlete Jean Bouin stands in the courtyard of the Marseille stade Vélodrome. A photograph of this work is included in the gallery below. Bouin was killed in action during World War I fighting near Saint-Mihiel. The casting was carried out by Gatti and inauguration took place on 5 June 1922. Roux also completed a bust of the athlete.

9. 'Masks of "Thétis, Mercure et Ceres. These can be seen at the top of the three entrances to the Caisse d'Épargne in Marseille, place Estrangin-Pastré? This is a much decorated building. Built in 1904 and designed by the architect Tournaire, the pediment was sculpted by Henri-Édouard Lombard and Auguste Carli created a bas-relief for the face of the building giving on to the cours Pierre Puget.

10. La France armée. A Roux bronze which stands on the top of the Monument des Mobiles des Bouches-du-Rhône in front of Église des Réformés in Marseille. This honours the reservists and members of the "garde mobile" who fought in the Franco-Prussian war of 1870. At the base of the monument, Roux added four groups of soldiers.

11. Monument celebrating the American aid and friendship given to France 1914-1918. This monument in Chaumont is inscribed "A l'amitié et à l'aide Américaines La France Reconnaissante Hommage du département de la Haute-Marne et de la ville de Chaumont". Roux completed the sculptural work involved. A woman representing France holds the shoulder of a French soldier who is shaking the hand of an American soldier. The sculpture was inaugurated on 3 June 1923 in the presence of the French President, Mr. Millerand, the Chairman of the council, Mr. Poincaré, the Justice Minister, Ambassadors from the Allied Nations, representatives of foreign press and numerous civilian and military dignitaries from the town and Haute-Marne.

12. Antoine Fortuné Marion. This bust by Roux, executed in 1903, is located on the esplanade of Marseille's Palais Longchamp.

13. Nicolas Poussin. Roux' 1911 statue of Nicolas Poussin can be seen in Les Andelys, Poussin's birthplace.

14. Charles Delanglade Roux submitted a plaster bust of Delanglade to the 1931 Salon des artistes français.

== Gallery of works by Constant Roux ==
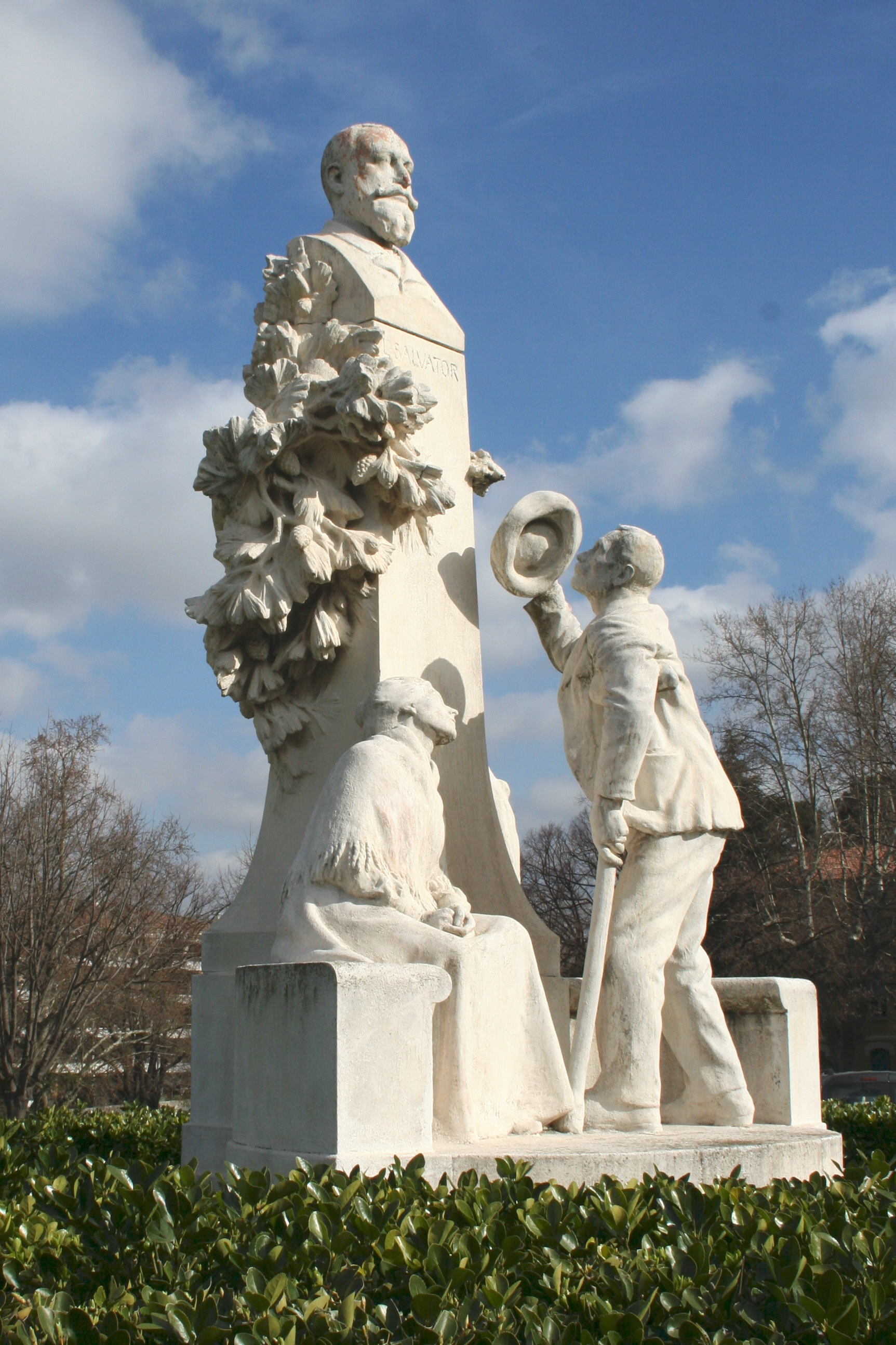
Les convalescents rendant hommage à Louis Salvator

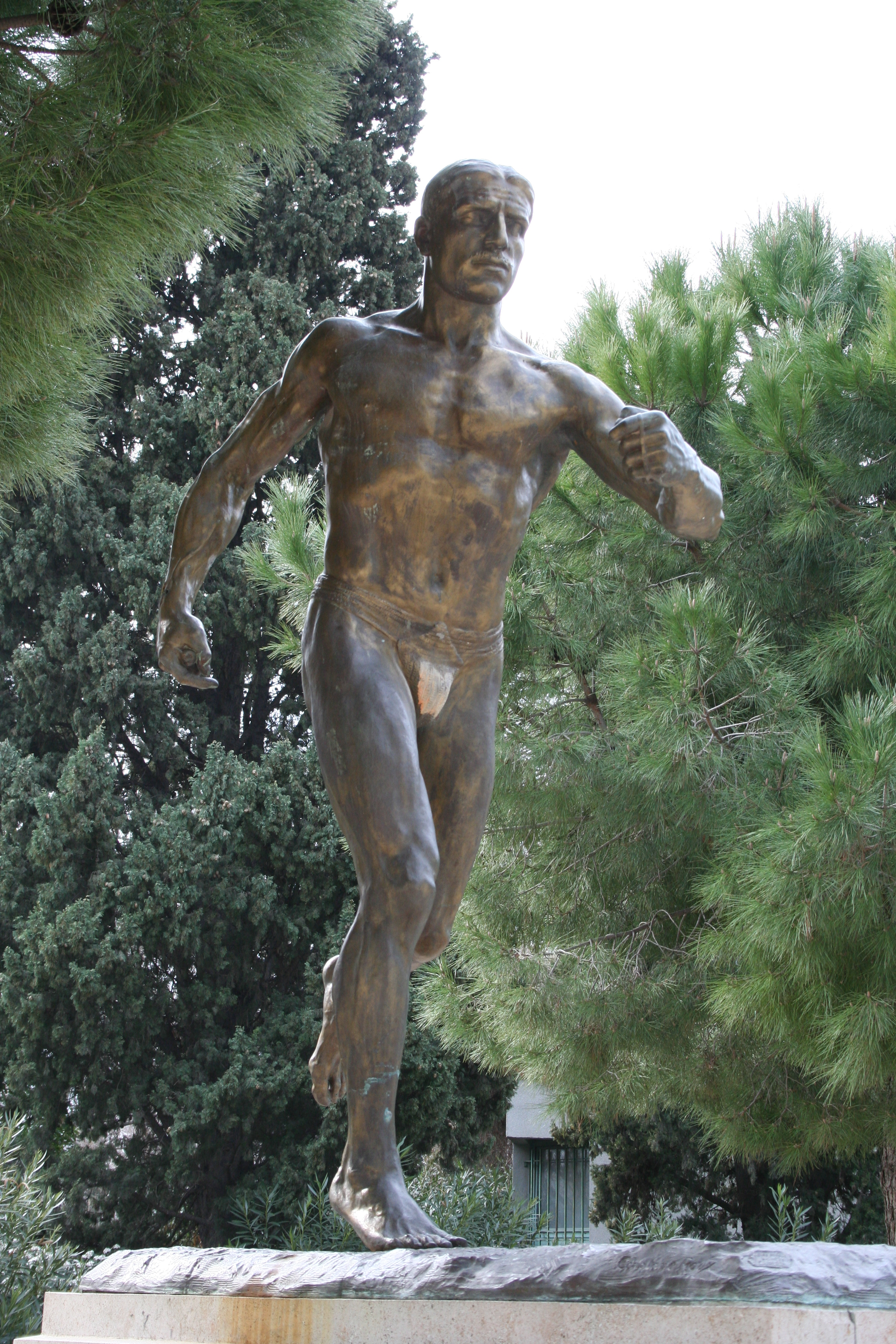
Jean Bouin statue.

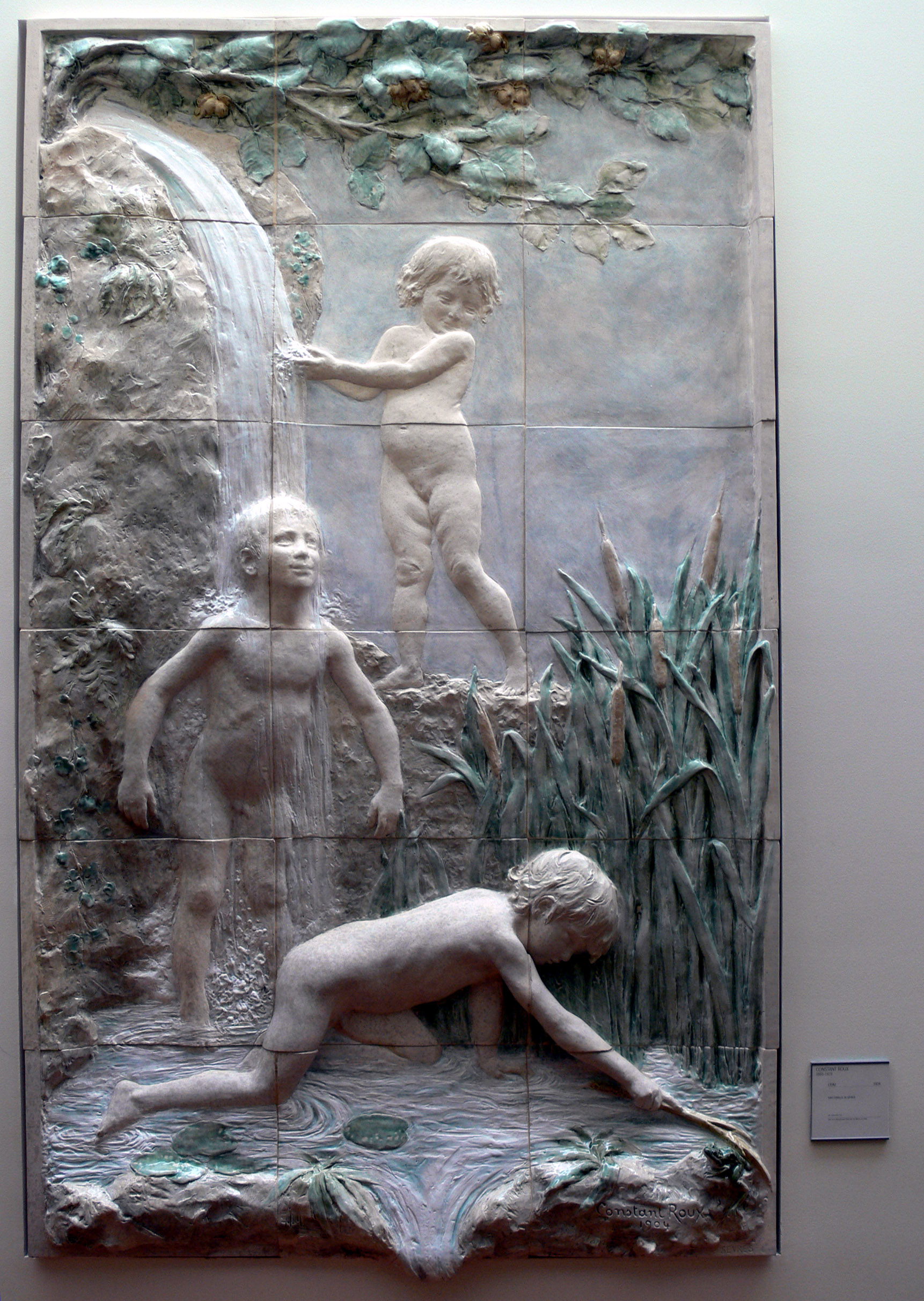
L'eau in La Piscine, Musée d'art et d'industrie. Roubaix.

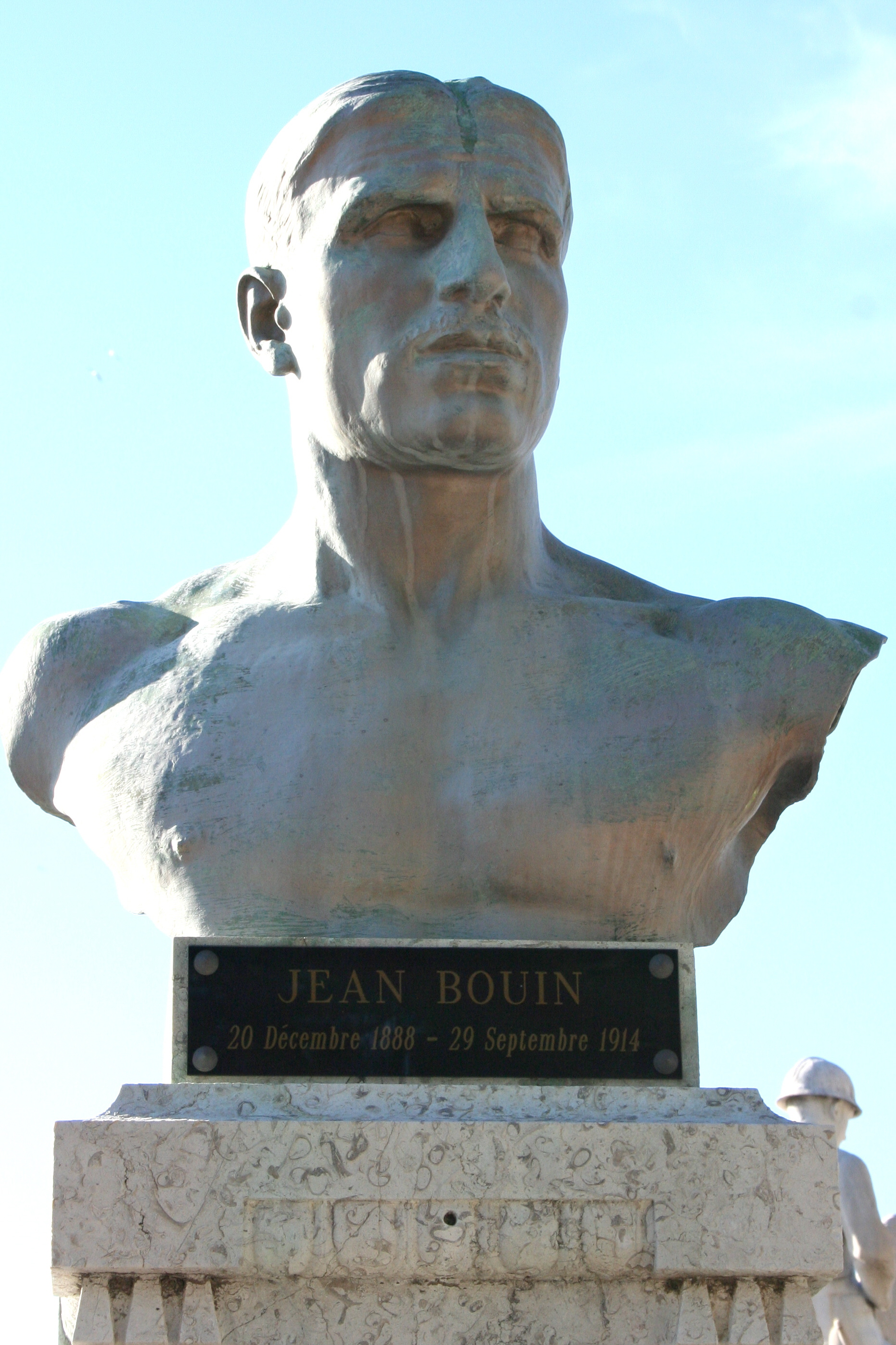
Bust of Bouin.

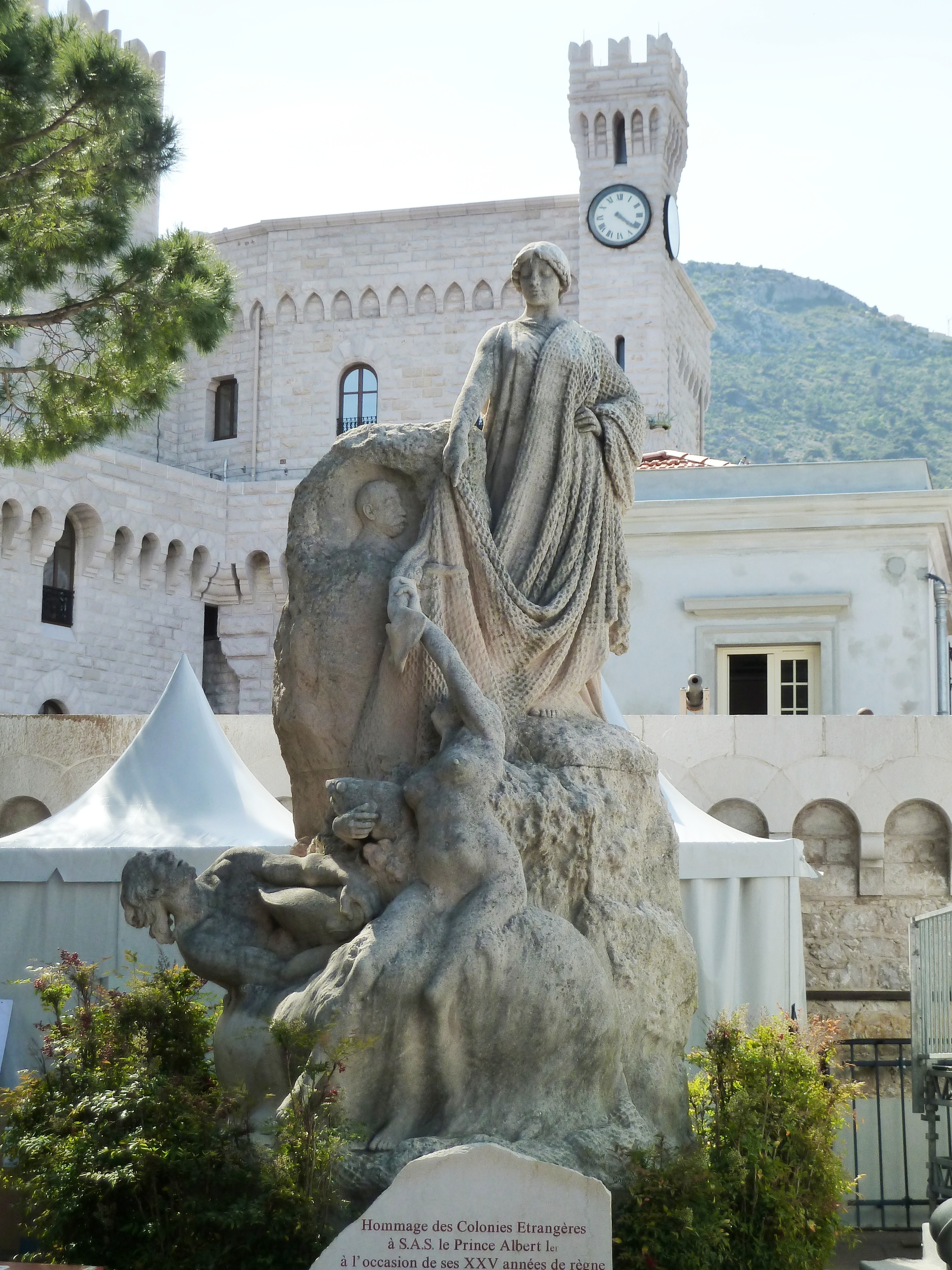
Monaco sculpture
