= Fernande de Mertens =

Belgian-French painter

Baroness Fernande Hortense Cécile de Mertens
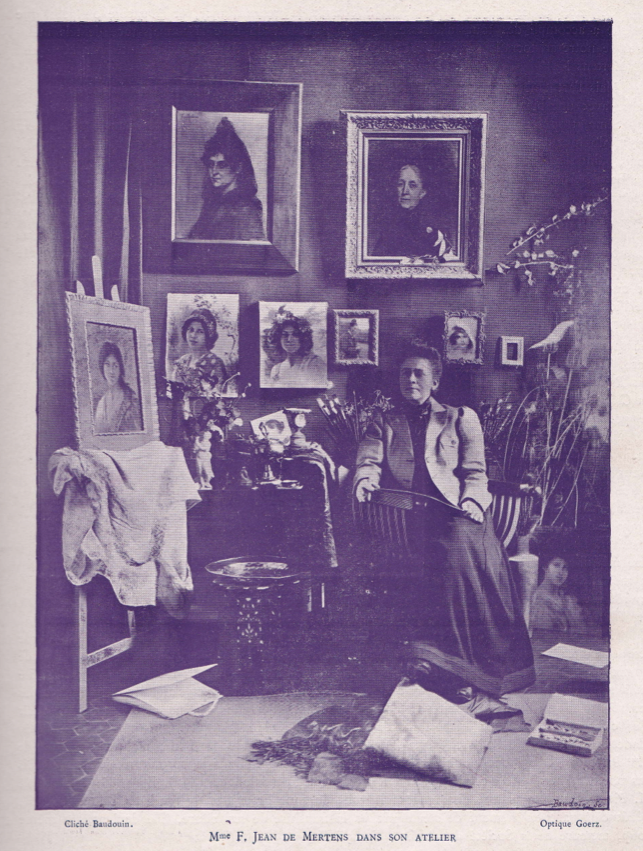
- Fernande de Mertens in her studio, 1900
- Born: 9 May 1850; Brussels
- Died: 24 January 1924 (aged 73); Marseille
- Education: École des Beaux-Arts, Marseille
- Spouse: Pierre Jean

Fernande Hortense Cécile de Mertens (9 May 1850 - 24 January 1924) was a Belgian-French painter.

== Life ==
Fernande de Mertens was the fifth of six children of the baron Edouard Mertens and his wife Sophie Lambertine Woelfing, and Fernande was thus a baroness herself. Hélène Échinard writes that in Marseille, Fernande attended the École des Beaux-Arts where she was taught by Théodore Jourdan and Dominique Antoine Magaud. Aged 35, on 27 April 1886, she married the French painter Pierre Jean, and thus acquired French citizenship. In 1888, she became a member of the Société des Artistes Français.

The couple had a dedicated studio at the Boulevard de la Corderie in Marseille, where she taught the use of pastel – a popular technique at the time for young girls of respected background.

Fernande and her husband never had children. Although her father Edouard and his three brothers had a total of fourteen children among them, there were no grandchildren for the Mertens nobility; the last known bearer of the name and title died in 1926, not long after Fernande's own death.

== Work ==
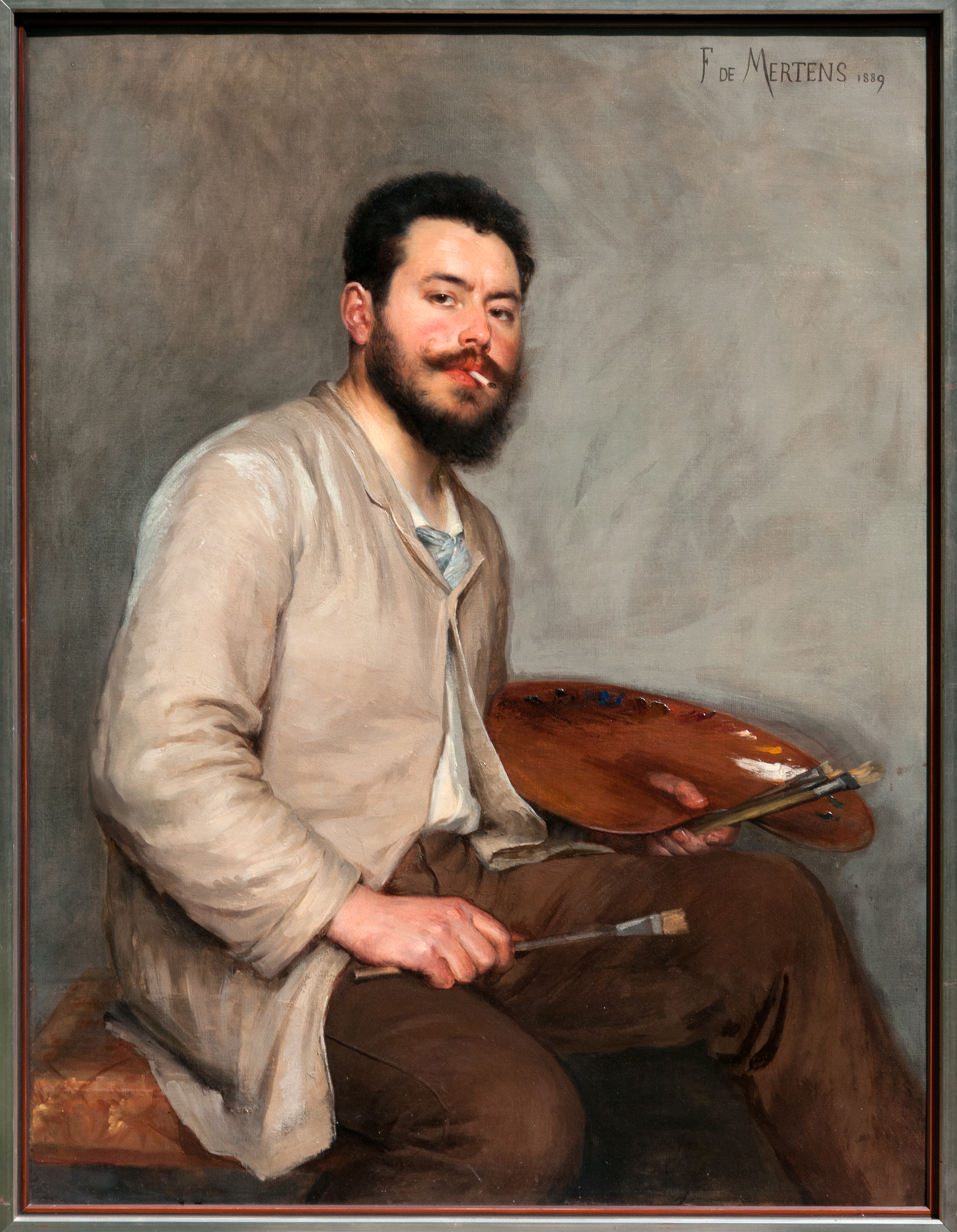
Portrait of Pierre Jean (1889).

The Provençal painters of the late 19th and early 20th century, favouring subjects from the Provence region, are often referred to as the Provençal School, with Fernande de Mertens being one of their few female painters.

Aside from pastel, in which she has produced primarily female portraits, she also worked with oil, producing portraits as well as genre scenes.

Her works have been exhibited in multiple salons, including Nîmes, Montpellier, Lyon, Niort, Draguignan, Aix-en-Provence, and her hometown Marseille. Starting from 1879, her paintings have been exhibited in Paris as well, including in the Paris Salon, where she has presented at least 13 paintings between 1879 and 1900, primarily portraits. Many portraits were of Marseille locals, and known or attributed portraits include one she painted of the painter Alfred Casile, of Gabriel Fabre, and of her husband Pierre Jean. (Her husband, incidentally, had presented a portrait of her at the salon two years earlier.)

A portrait of her mother, presented in 1882, received a gold medal at Nîmes the next year, the same year her mother died; following this, the portrait would remain in Mertens' own private possession. In 1884, her work received an honorable mention at the Paris Salon, and between 1886 and 1897, most of her contributions have received illustrations in the Salon's catalogue. Her genre scene Chez Grand-Père was lauded as "a family scene from which a great poetry emerges".

Among others, her works are now in the collections of Musée Ziem in Martigues and Musée des Beaux-Arts as well as Musée Cantini in Marseille. Since her marriage, her works have been signed as F. de Mertens, J.-F. de Mertens, and F. Jean de Mertens.

== Gallery ==
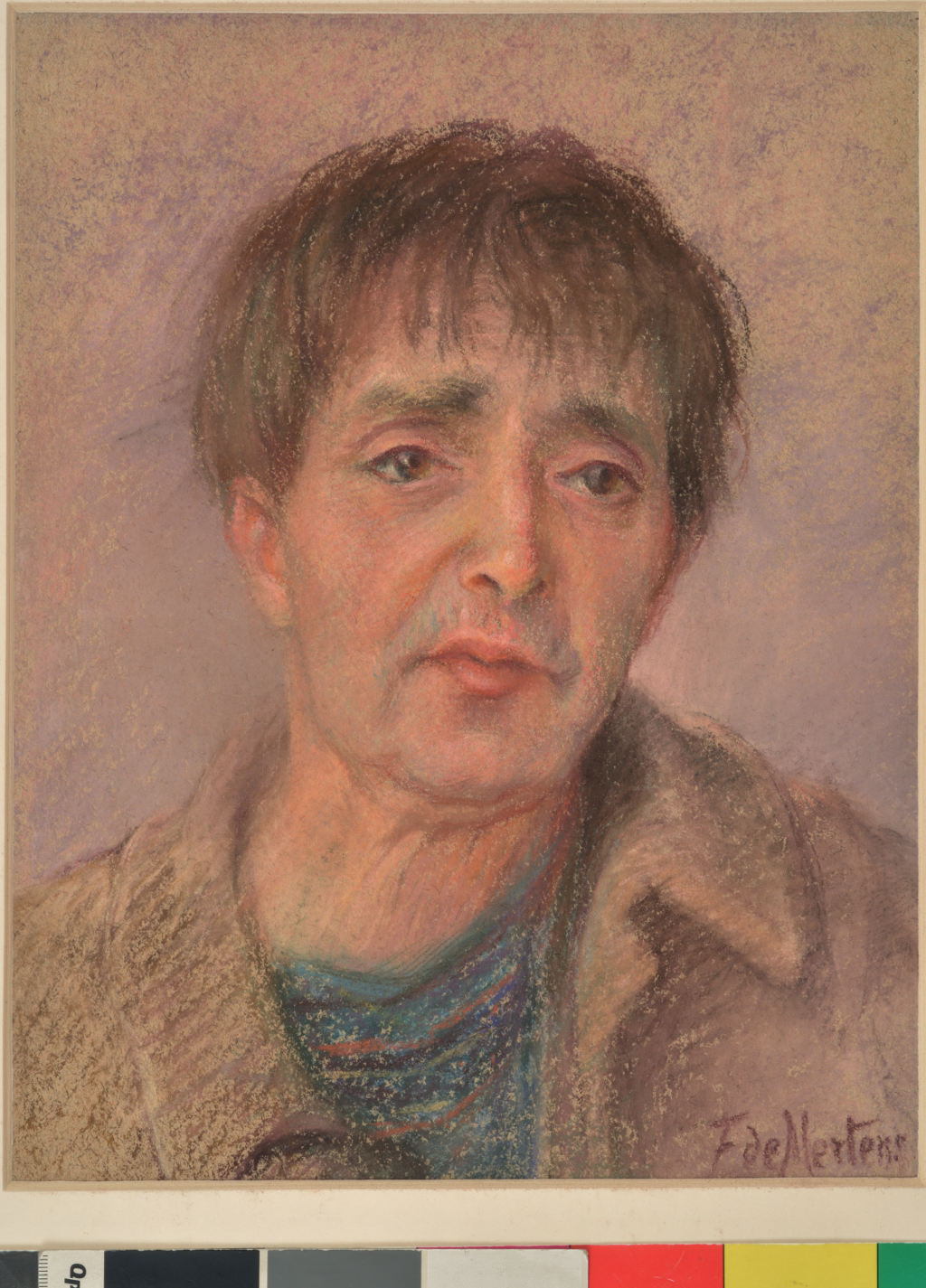
Portrait of Gabriel Fabre (1917)

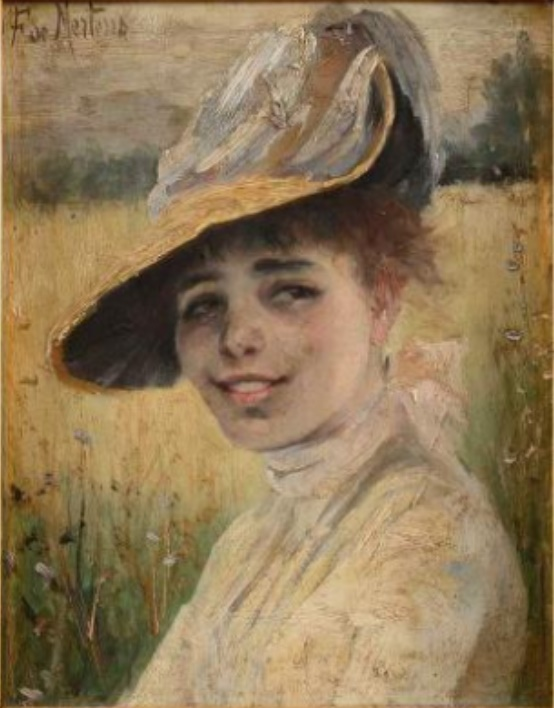
Portrait of a woman

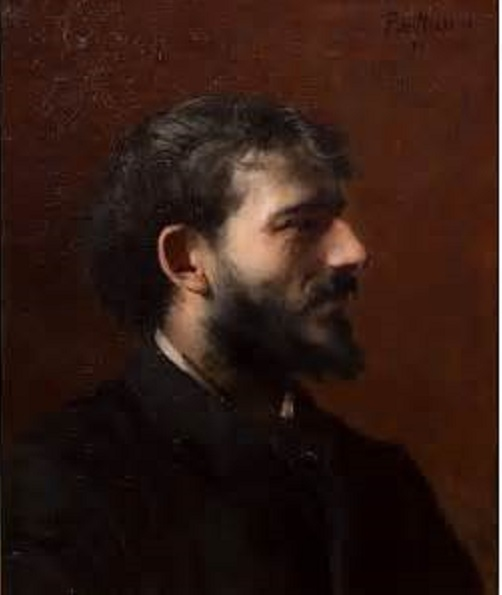
Portrait of Alfred Casile (Attributed)

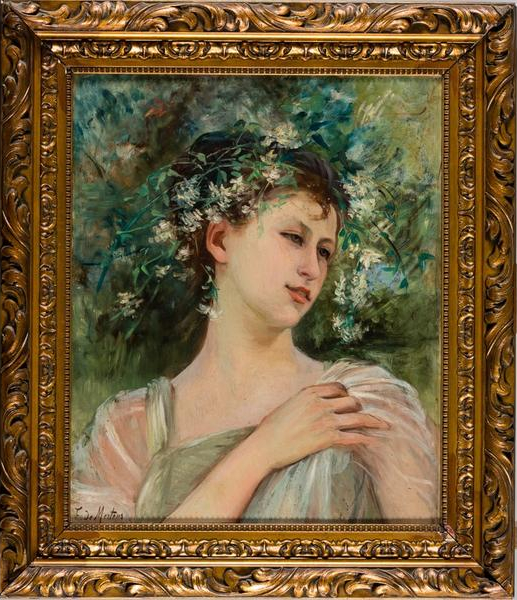
Portrait of a woman with a crown of flowers

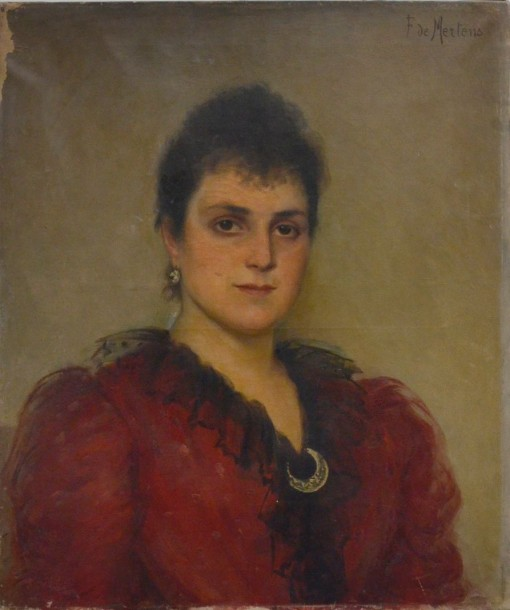
Portrait of a woman

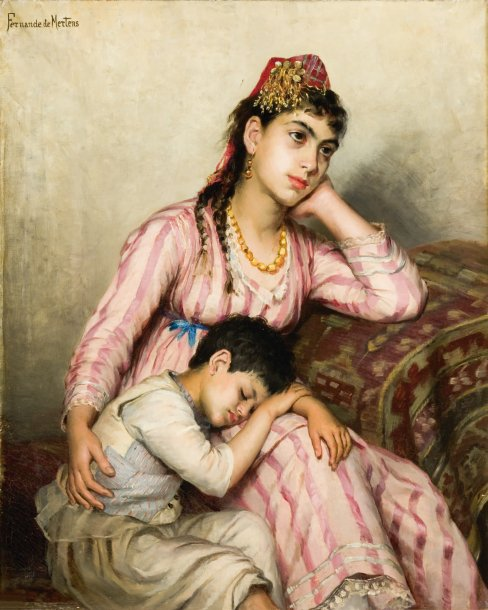
Daydreaming (c. 1880)

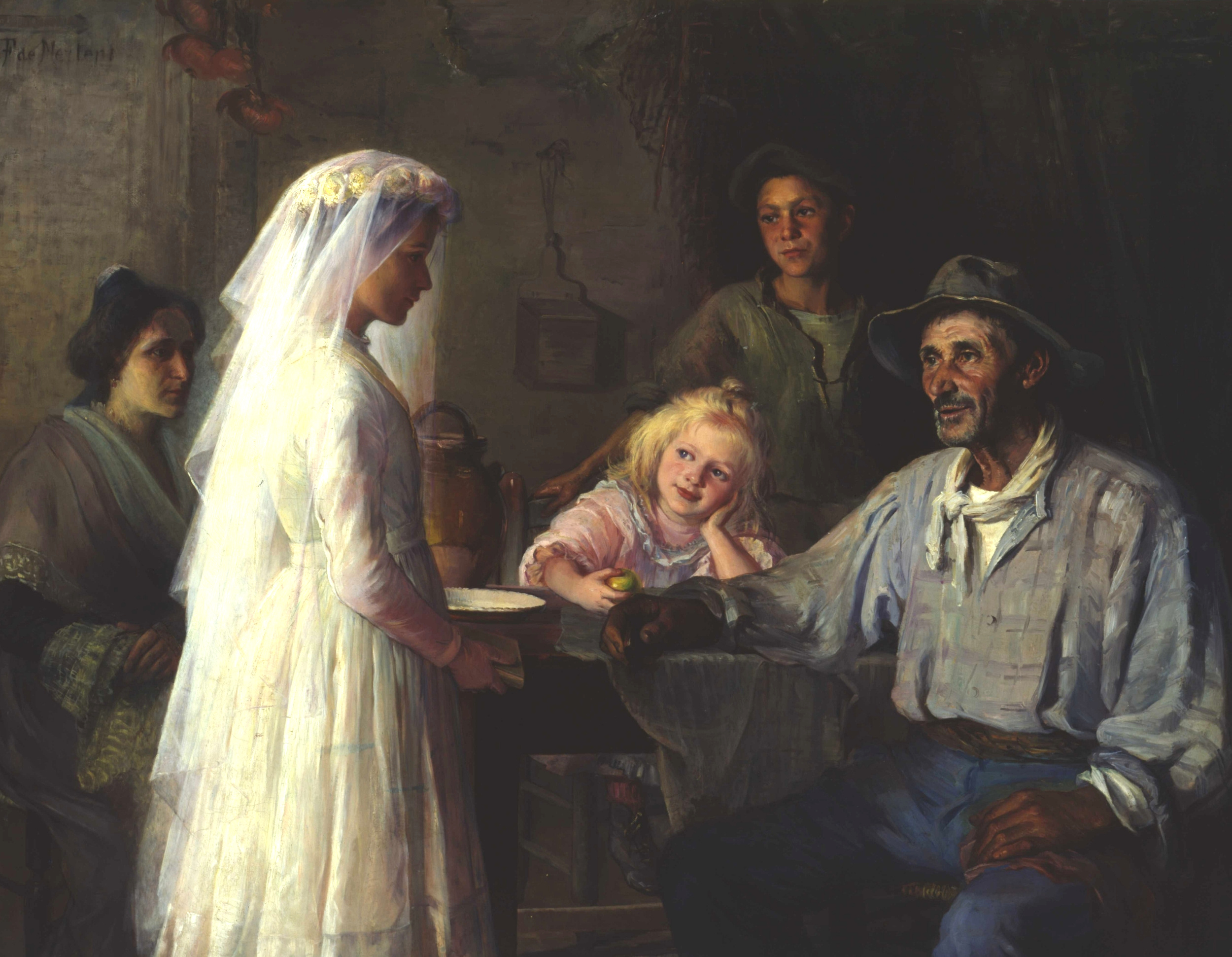
Chez Grand-Père (1900)
