= Alfred Casile =

French painter (1848–1909)

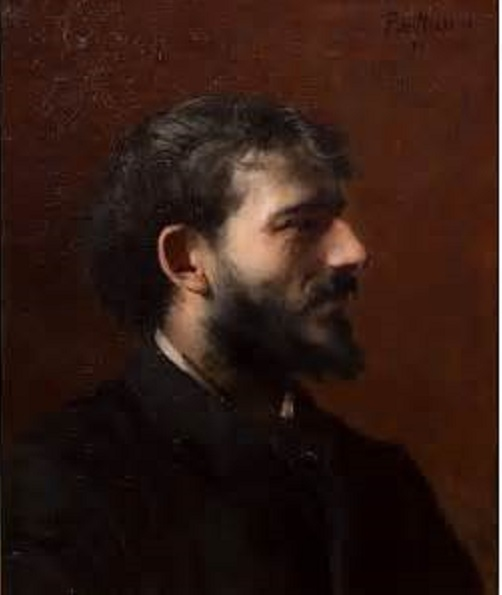
- Portrait attributed to Fernande de Mertens
- Born: February 9, 1848; Marseille, France
- Died: June 1, 1909 (aged 61); Marseille, France
- Occupation: Painter

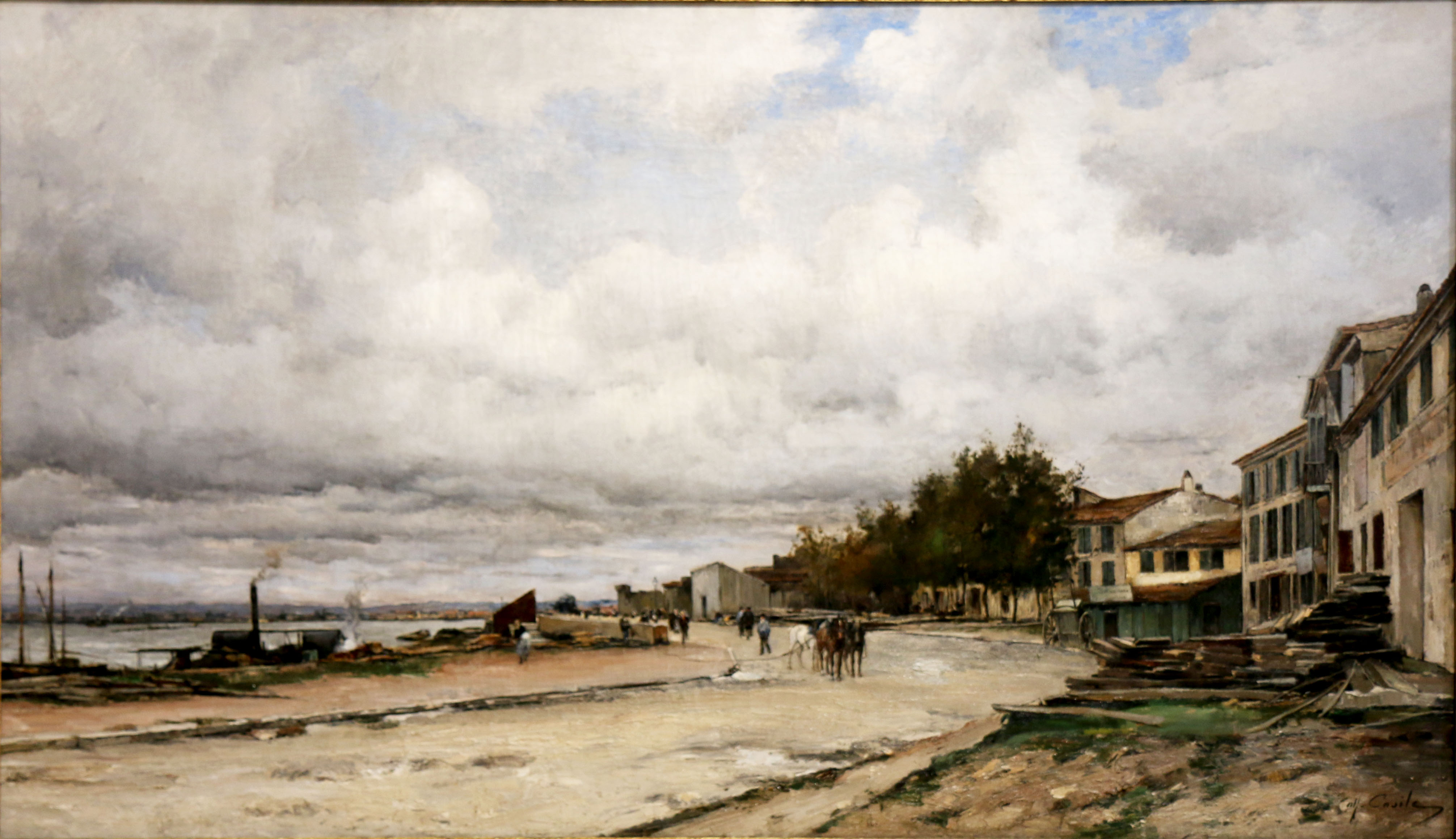
Quay on the Rhône at Avignon

Alfred Casile (1848–1909) was a French landscape and marine painter.

== Biography ==
His mother was from an old, established Marseille family. His father was of Corsican origin and held a high position in the railroad company. He received his art instruction from Philippe-Auguste Jeanron at the École Supérieure des Beaux-Arts de Marseille. At first, he was employed by the dock company but, in 1879, was able to relocate to Paris, where he had his first showing at the Salon in 1880.

Once he had become settled there, he took further lessons from Antoine Guillemet and made the acquaintance of several well known artists, including Camille Pissarro, Alfred Sisley and Claude Monet. After a lengthy trip to Italy, he returned to Marseille where, in 1891, he married Constance Dutoint, a woman from Brussels he had met in Paris.

He and Constance spent several years in Belgium, where he painted in Bruges, Antwerp, Ghent and many other locations. After going back to Marseille, he slowly became addicted to absinthe, and died of its effects in 1909.

Their youngest daughter would marry the painter, Louis-Mathieu Verdilhan. His granddaughter, Geneviève Casile, is an honorary Sociétaire of the Comédie-Française.

His works may be seen at the Musée Granet, Musée Calvet, Musée des Beaux-Arts de Béziers, Musée de la Castre, Musée d'Évreux, Musée de Grenoble, Musée Cantini, Musée des Beaux-Arts de Marseille, Musée Grobet-Labadié and the Musée d'Art de Toulon. A street in Marseille is named after him.
