= Louis Mathieu Verdilhan =

French painter

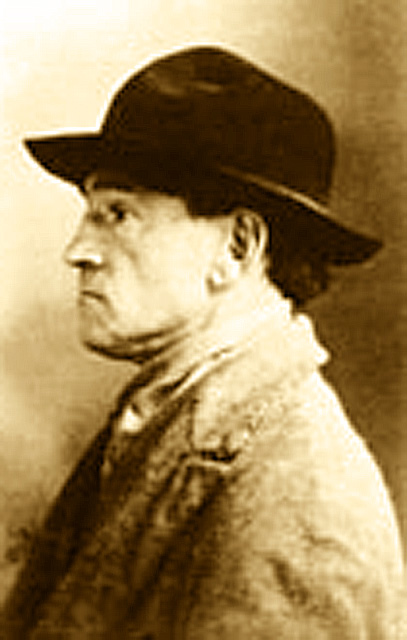
Louis Mathieu Verdilhan

Louis Mathieu Verdilhan (24 November 1875 – 15 December 1928) was a French artist known especially for his paintings of the Old Port of Marseille.

He was born in Saint-Gilles-du-Gard. His family moved to the Chartreux district in Marseille in 1877. Born into a poor family, he apprenticed to a house painter in 1890 but began drawing with the support of the Marseille artist Eugène Giraud. In 1895, he established a studio that he kept for his entire life, at No. 12 rue Fort-Notre-Dame. In 1898, he traveled for the first time to Paris and worked with the decorator Adrien Karbowsky to produce part of the ornamentation of the Salon du bois of the decorative arts pavilion for the 1900 World's Fair. He returned to Marseille in 1900. In 1902, he lost his left eye in an accident.

His artistic career began in 1902 with an exhibition at Galeries Braun in Marseille and then, in 1905, an exhibition at the Palace of Architects at the Avenue du Prado. He exhibited in Paris in 1906 at the Salon des Indépendants. His early works were painted in a style reminiscent of Monticelli and van Gogh. From 1907 to 1913 his work was influenced by Fauvism and German Expressionism. From 1908 he participated regularly in the Salon d'Automne. In 1909, he spent six months in Versailles where he made many paintings. He occupied from 1910 to 1914 a workshop at No. 12 quay of Rive Neuve. Mobilized in Toulon during the First World War, Verdilhan met Albert Marquet and was influenced by his work. He also met André Suarès and Antoine Bourdelle.

After the war, he resided successively in Aix-en-Provence, Cassis and Toulon. On 16 March 1919, he married Hélène Casile, the younger daughter of painter Alfred Casile. He exhibited in New York at the gallery Kraushaar.

The paintings he made between 1920 and 1926 are characterized by light, flat colors and harmonious forms bounded by simplified outlines. In 1925 he painted a mural for the Provence pavilion of l'Exposition universelle. In 1926 he painted a decoration for the Opéra de Marseille: this painting represents the festival of 14 July in Marseille and was much criticized during the inauguration of the opera.

His palette darkened in the works of his final years. He died of laryngeal cancer on 15 December 1928 in Marseilles.

Verdilhan's brother was the painter and sculptor André Alexandre Verdilhan (1881–1963).

== Gallery ==
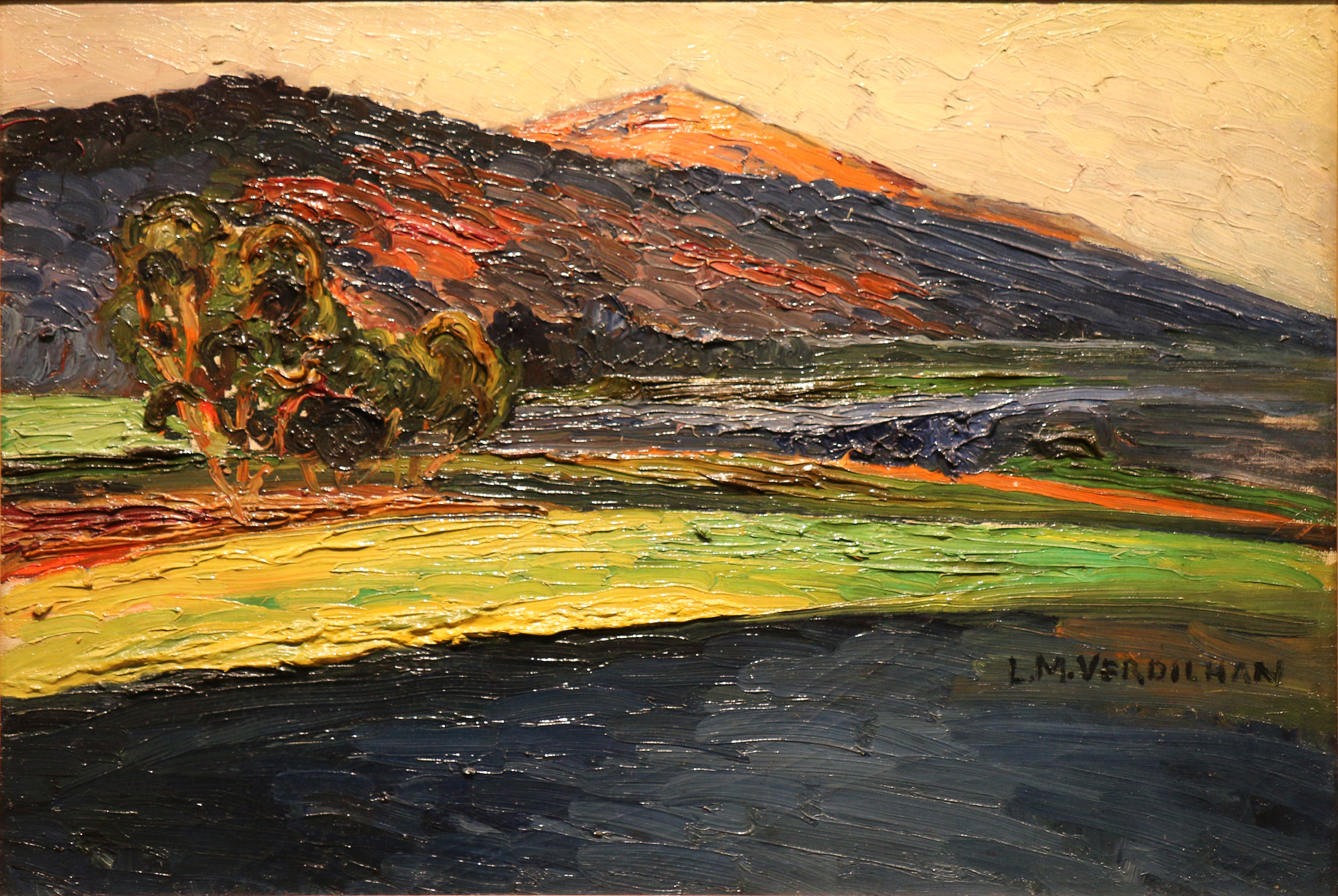
Paysage - Aix-en-Provence, ca. 1902–1907, Toulon, Musée d'Art

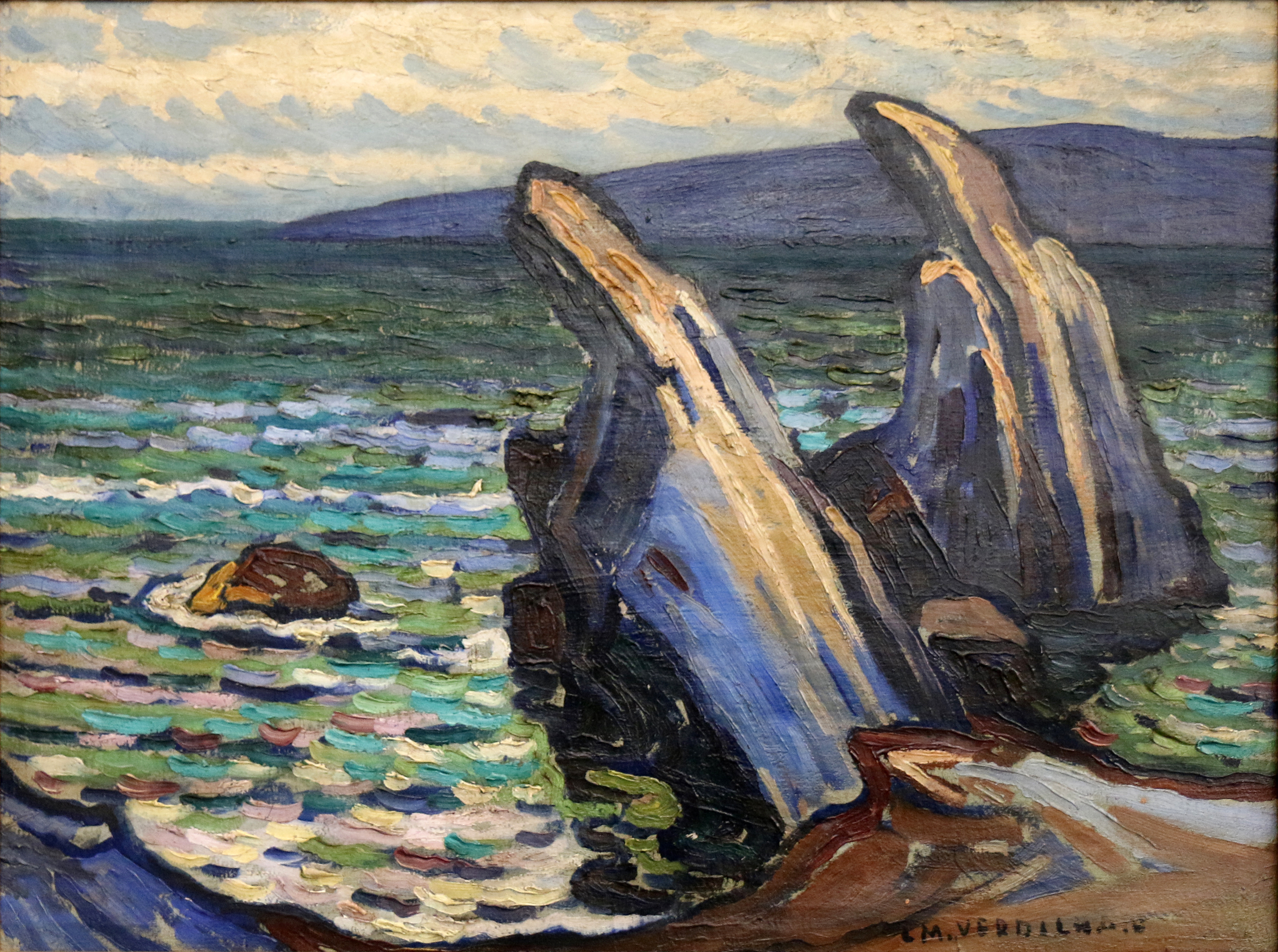
Littoral Varois, ca. 1907

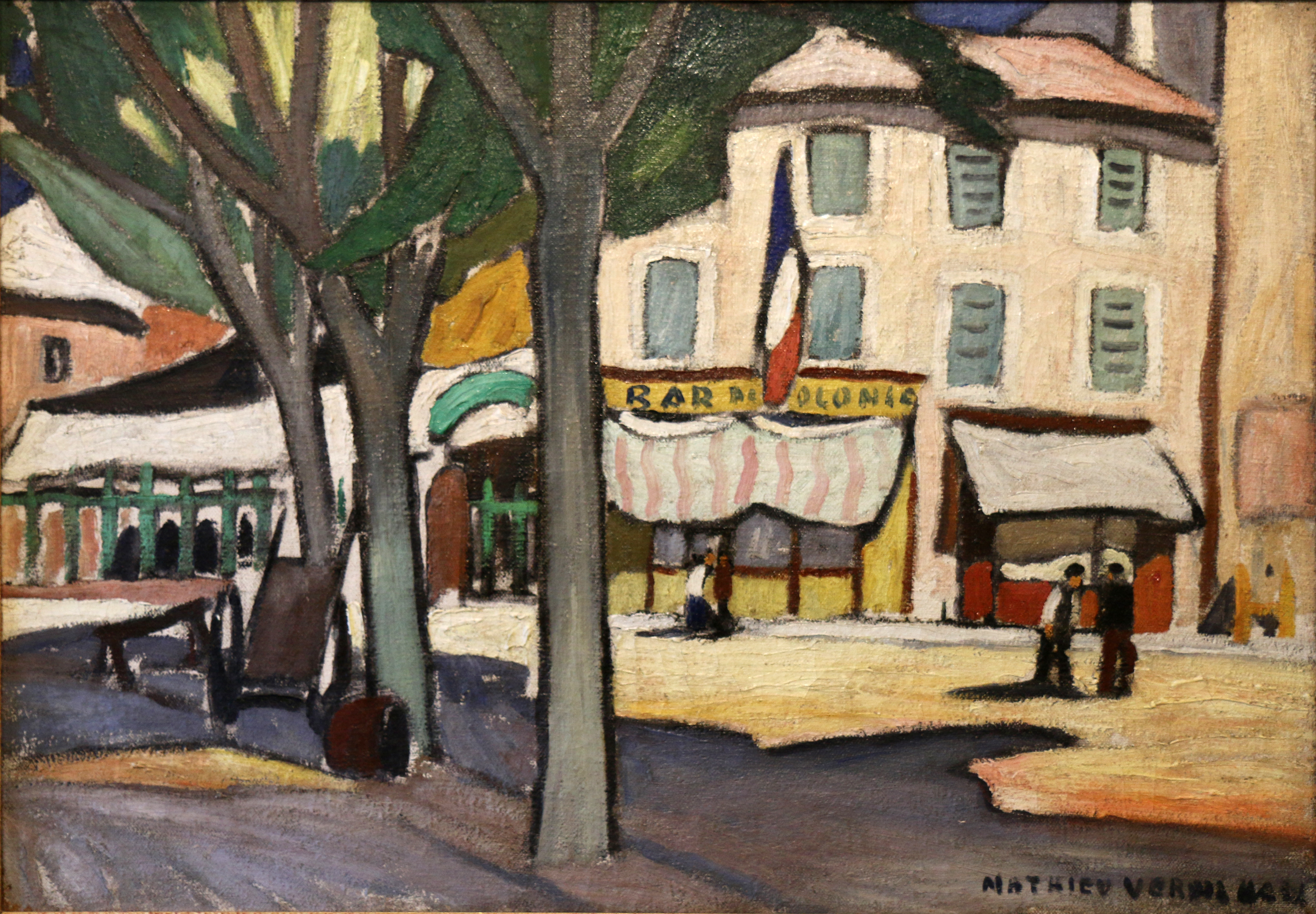
Le bar des colonies à Toulon, ca. 1910–1915

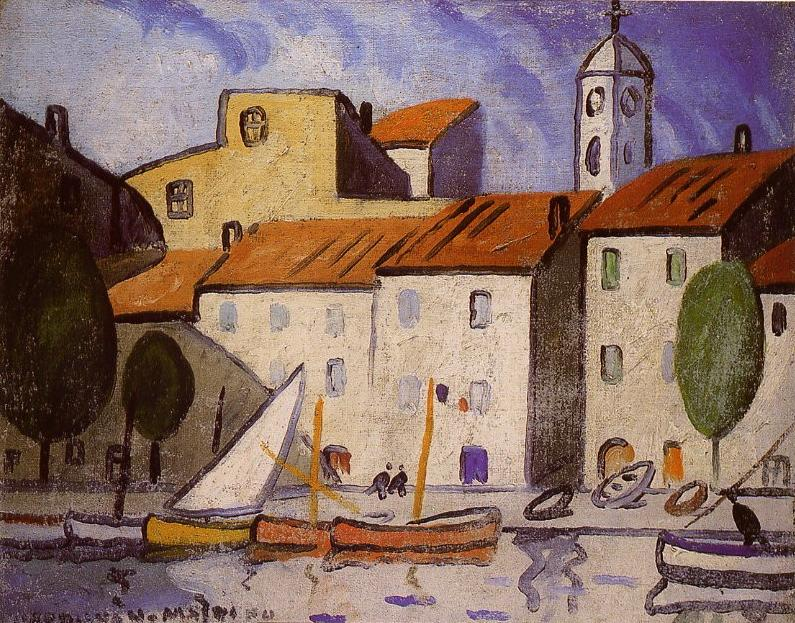
Le Port de Martigues, ca. 1913–1925

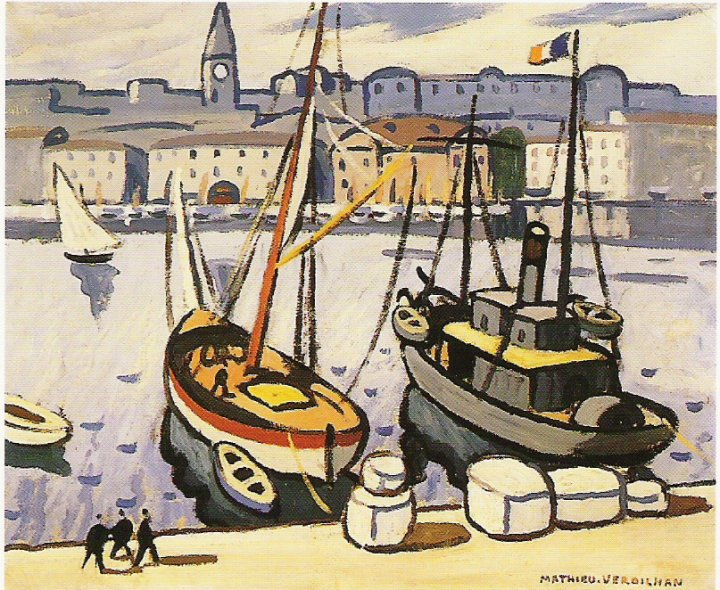
Le vieux-port de Marseille

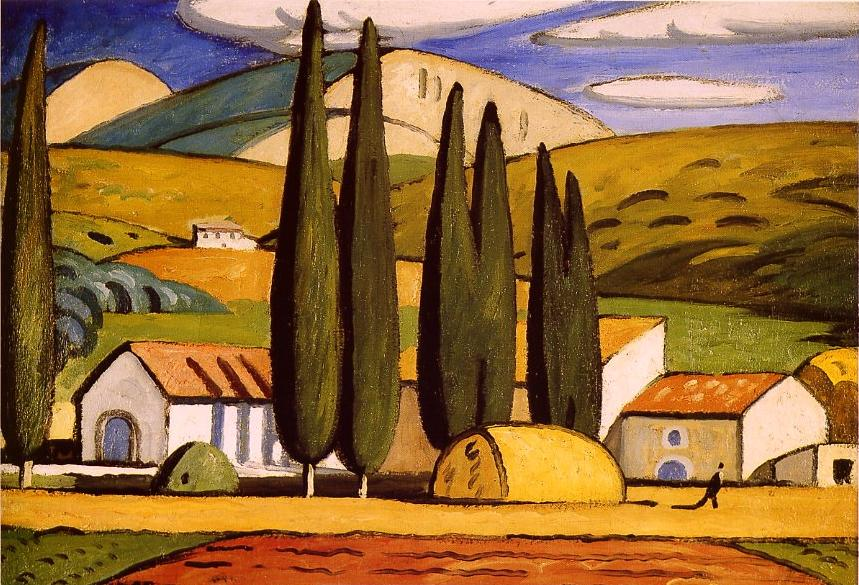
Paysage, maison et cyprès

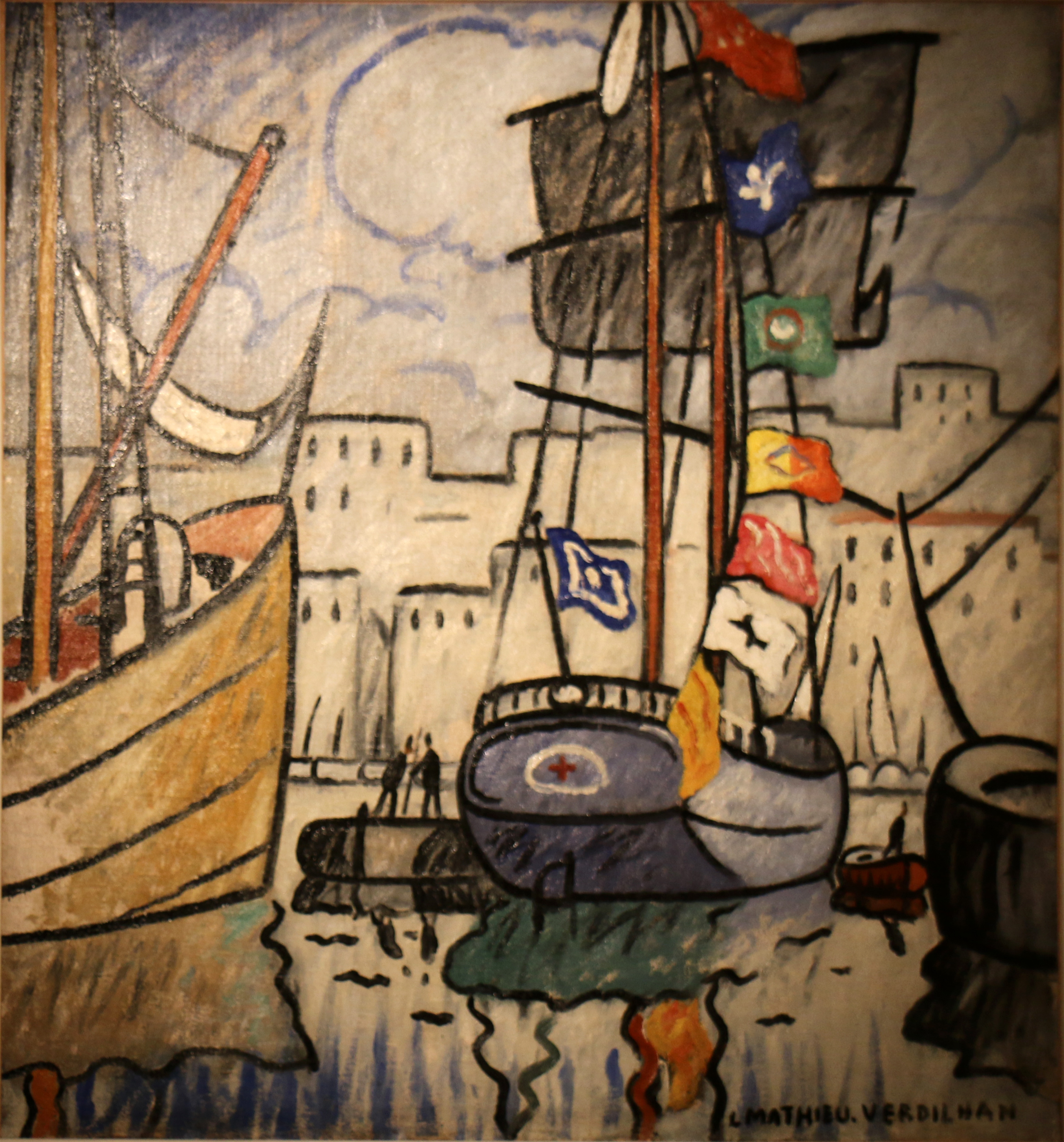
Le Grand Pavois dans le port de Marseille

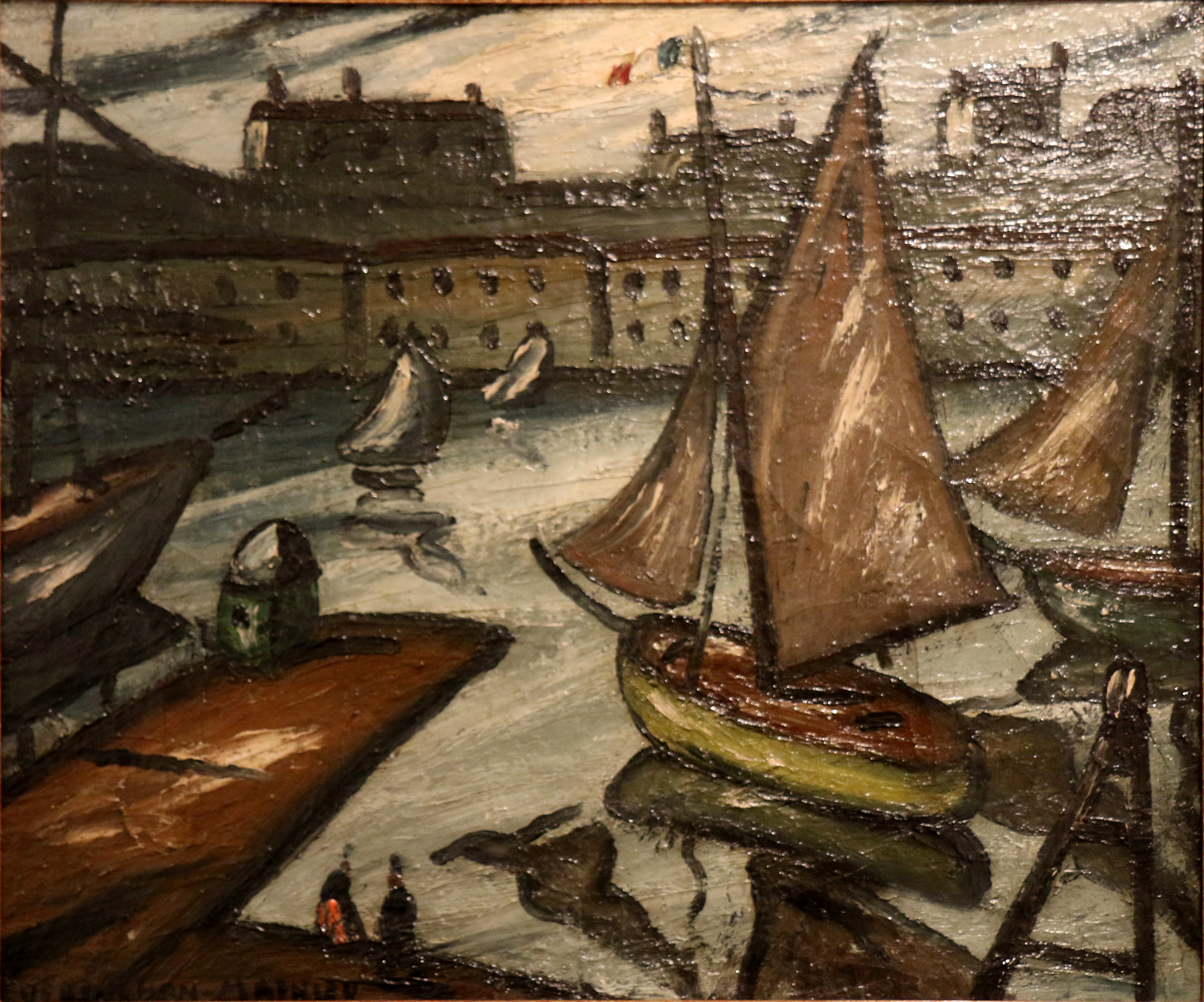
Vieux port de Marseille, 1927
