= José Silbert =

French painter (1862–1936)

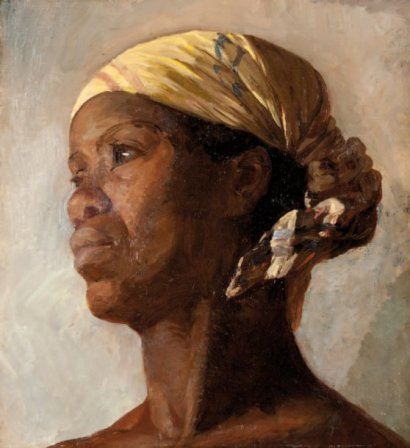
Moorish Woman

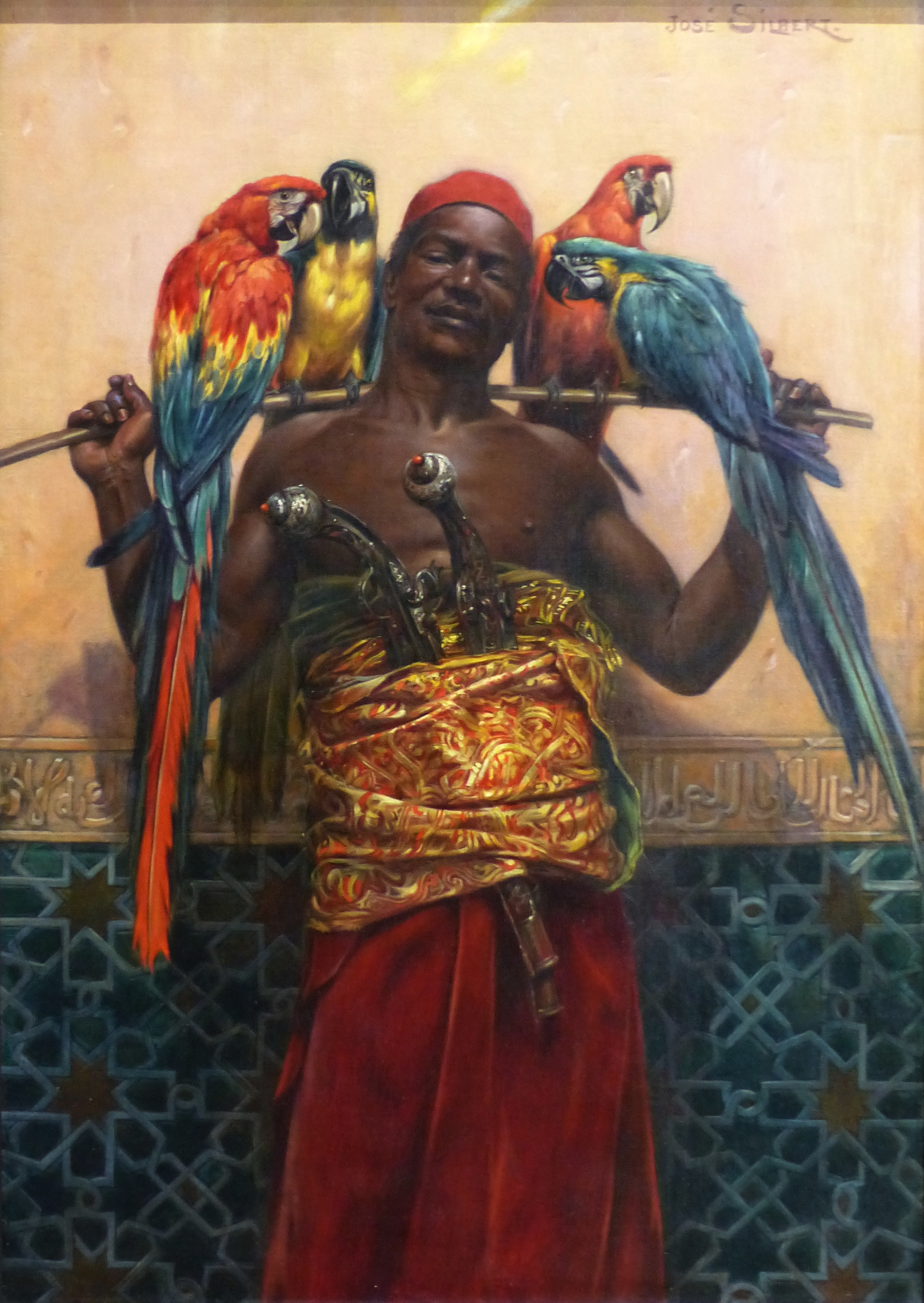
The Macaw Trainer

Marie Joseph Jean Raymond Silbert, known as José Silbert (20 January 1862, Aix-en-Provence - 1 July 1936, Marseille) was a French Orientalist painter.

== Biography ==
His father, Sébastien Pierre Antoine Silbert (1820–1895), was a doctor. He received his first painting lessons locally from Jean Baptiste Martin (1818–1901). He then moved to Paris and enrolled at the Académie des Beaux-Arts, where he studied with Jules-Joseph Lefebvre and Luc-Olivier Merson Malerei studierte.

He made his debut at the Paris in 1884, with a scene from the life of Saint Marinus. In 1885, he displayed a portrait of his father and, in 1887, a portrayal of Francis of Assisi with the Wolf of Gubbio.

During this period, and later, he made numerous trips to North Africa. There, he often stayed in Algeria with the Orientalist painter, Étienne Dinet. Under his influence, Silbert created similar works, which are now among his best known. At the Exposition coloniale de Marseille (1922), he was responsible for organizing the art exhibits. For several years, he was Director of the Association des Artistes Marseillais.

In 1908, he was named a Knight in the Legion of Honor. He was also an Officer in the Tunisian Order of Glory and the Order of the Dragon of Annam.

His works may be seen at the Musée des beaux-arts de Marseille, Musée des beaux-arts de Chambéry and the Musée Cantini

== Sources ==
- André Alauzen di Genova: Dictionnaire des peintres et sculpteurs de Provence, Alpes, Côte d'Azur. Laffitte, Marseille 1986, ISBN 978-2-86276-441-2.
- Roger Benjamin: Orientalist aesthetics, art, colonialism, and French North Africa, 1880–1930. University of California Press, Berkeley 2003, ISBN 0-520-22217-2.
- Sophie Biass-Fabiani: Peintres de la couleur en Provence. Provence-Alpes-Côte-d'Azur, Office Régional de la Culture, Marseille 1995, ISBN 2-7118-3194-9.
- Élisabeth Cazenave: L' Afrique du Nord révélée par les musées de province. Giovanangeli, Paris 2004, ISBN 2-909034-60-7.
