= Charles Delanglade =

French sculptor (1870–1952)

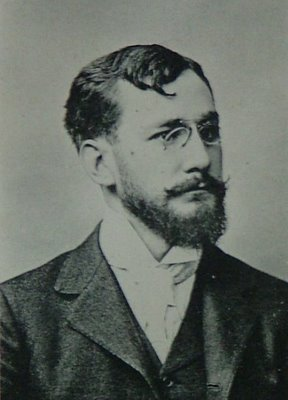
- Charles Delanglade in 1901
- Born: 26 May 1870; Marseille, France
- Died: 20 January 1952 (aged 81); Marseille, France
- Occupation: Sculptor

Charles Delanglade (1870–1952) was a French sculptor.
