= Théodore Jourdan =

French painter (1833–1908)

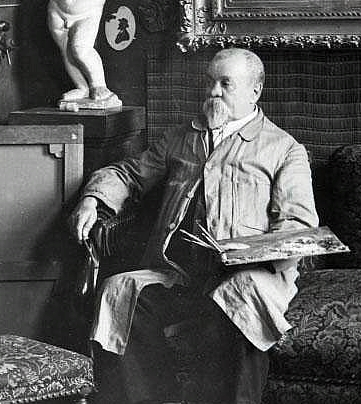
Théodore Jourdan (c. 1902)

Théodore Antoine Louis Jourdan (29 July 1833, Salon-de-Provence – 3 January 1908, Marseille) was a French painter of rural genre scenes.

== Biography ==
He began his studies at the École des Beaux-Arts de Marseille and completed them in the workshops of Émile Loubon, in Paris. His debut came at the Exposition Marseillaise of 1859 with "Une visite à Nazareth".

After 1865, he exhibited at the Salon in Paris. In 1879, he was awarded a gold medal at the Sydney International Exhibition.

He taught at his alma-mater, the École, from 1874 to 1903. His paintings were mostly created in the pastoral areas of Provence. Many of his works feature the local breed of sheep known as the Mérinos d'Arles.

He bequeathed nineteen large works and numerous drawings to his native village, Salon-de-Provence, in exchange for a lifetime pension, to be paid to his widow. These paintings are on display in a special gallery at the Musée de Salon et de la Crau.

His works may also be seen at the Musée Granet, Musée des Beaux-Arts de Marseille and the MUba Eugène Leroy.

== Gallery ==
Works by Theodore Jourdan, Salon-de-Provence, Musée de Salon et de la Crau

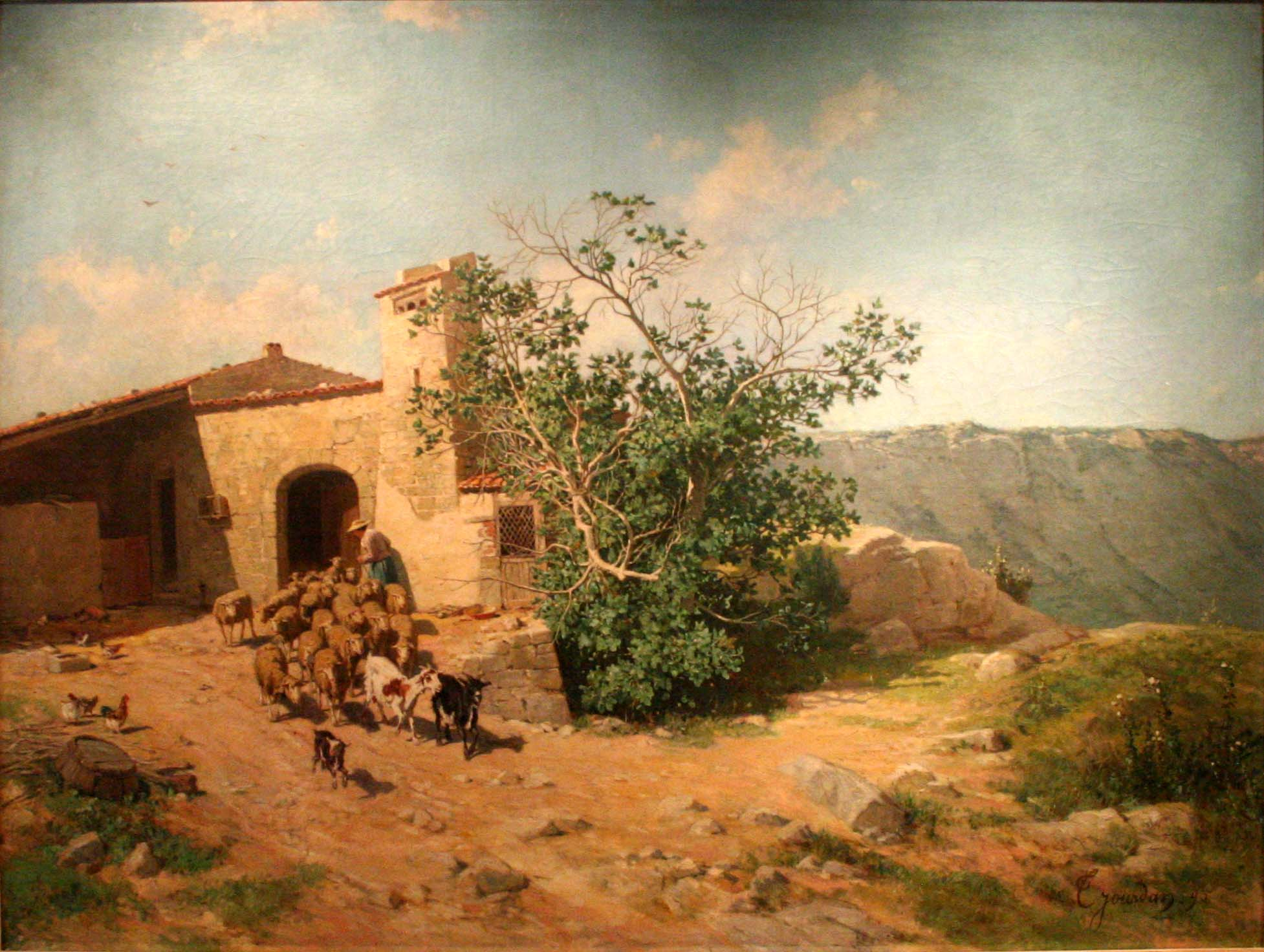
Exit from the Sheepfold

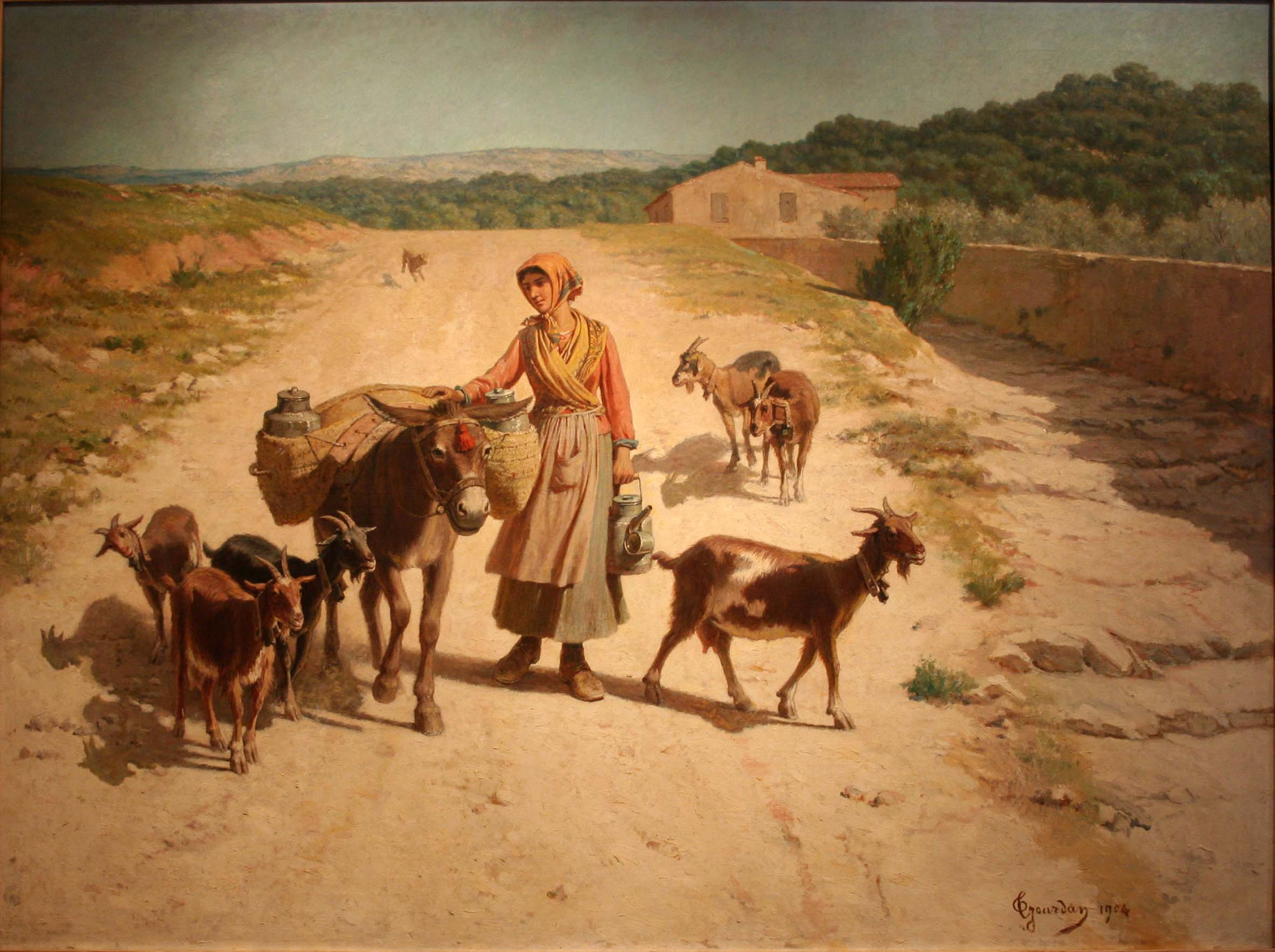
A Goatherd with Her Donkey

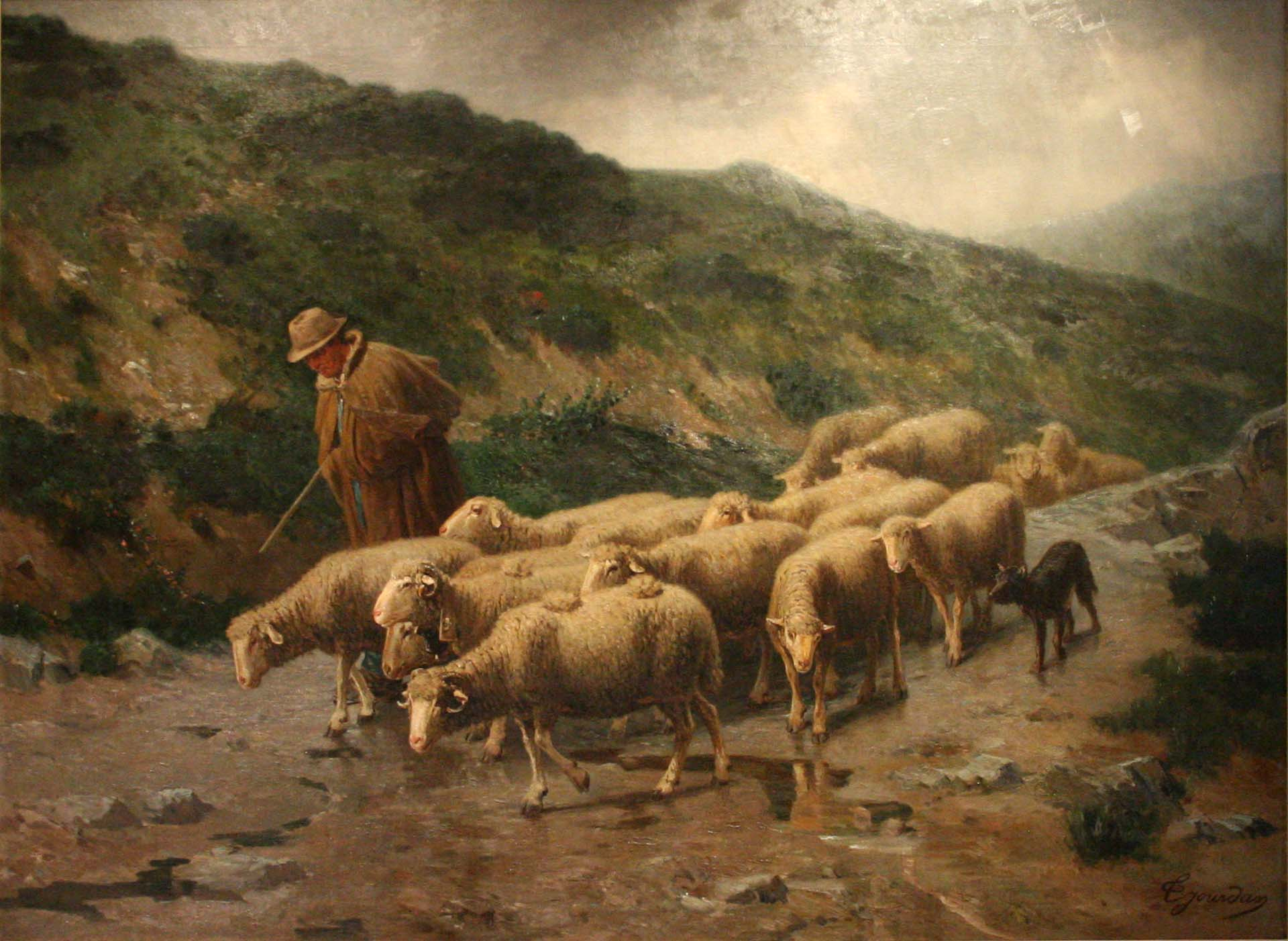
Shepherd and his flock under the storm

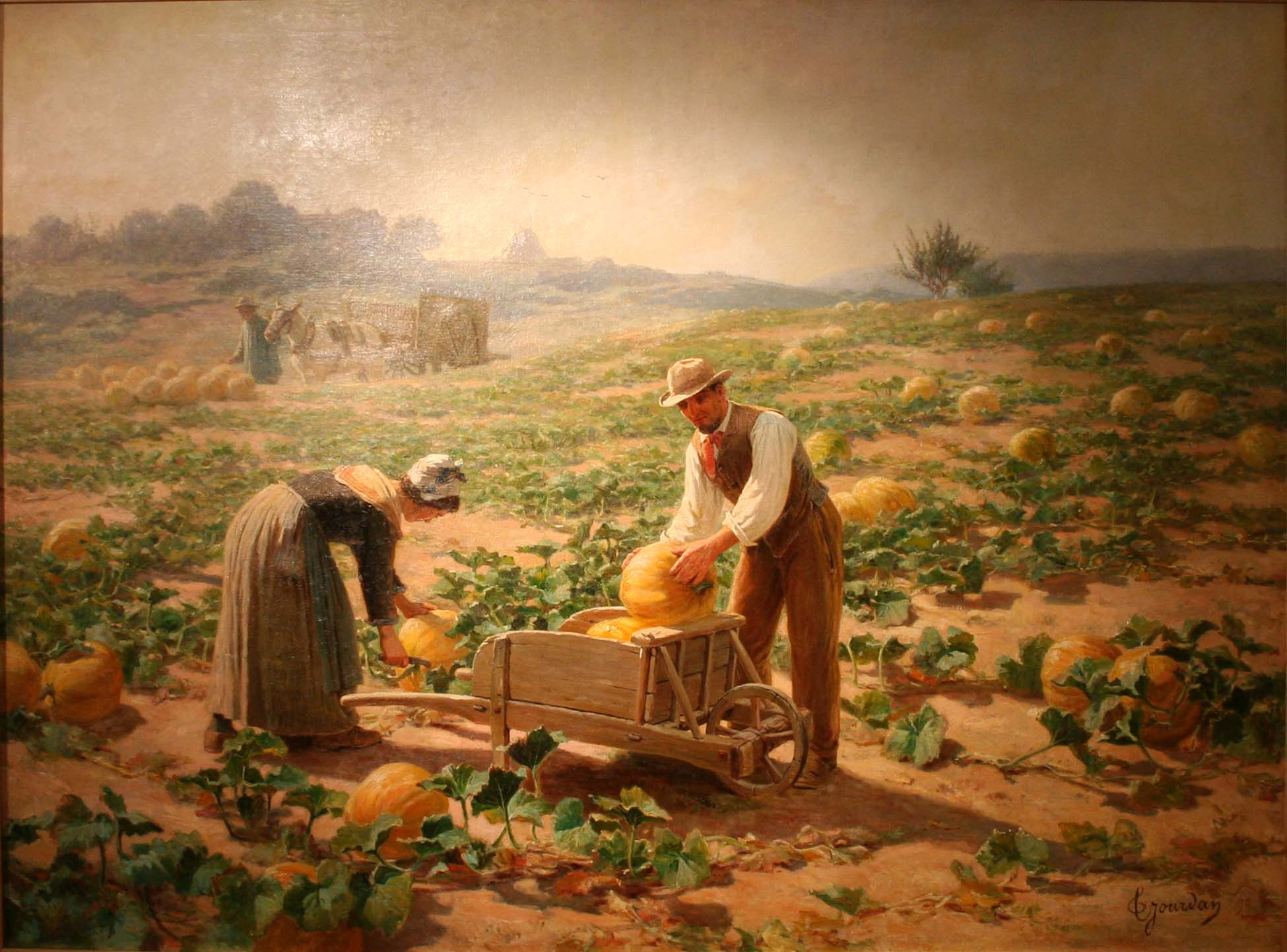
Harvesting squash in Provence

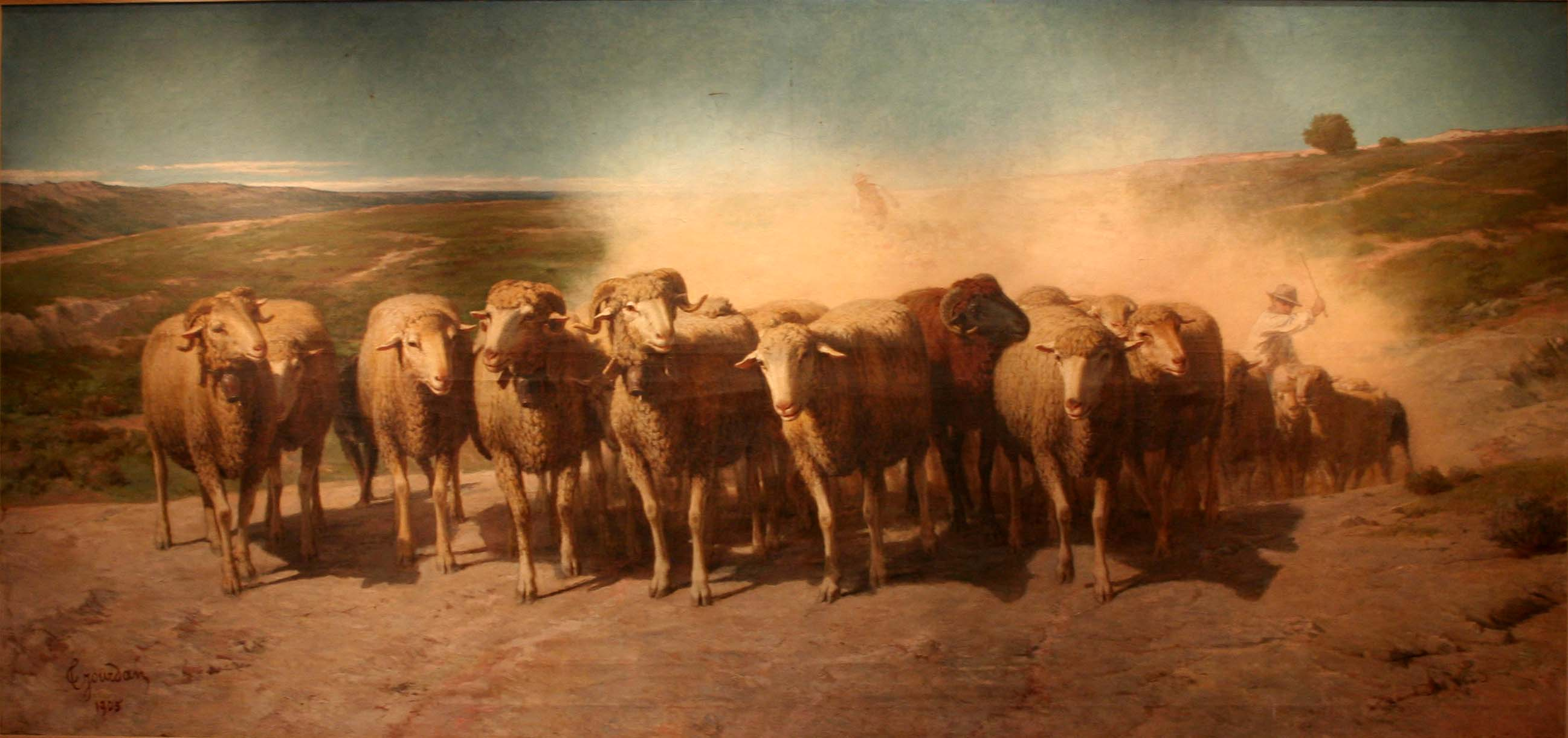
Flock of sheep leading the herd

Click on images to enlarge

== Sources ==
- André Alauzen and Laurent Noet, Dictionnaire des peintres et sculpteurs de Provence-Alpes-Côte d'Azur, Jeanne Laffitte, 2006 ISBN 978-2-86276-441-2
- Paul Masson (General ed.), Encyclopédie départementale des Bouches-du-Rhône, Archives départementales des Bouches-du-Rhône, Marseille, 1913-1937, Vol. XI pp.266-267
