= Albert Jean Baptiste Marie Vayssière =

French scientist (1854-1942)

- Born: 8 July 1854; Avignon, France
- Died: 13 January 1942 (aged 87); Marseille, France
- Known for: Work on opisthobranch gastropods
- Scientific career
- Fields: malacology, entomology
- Institutions: Faculté des Sciences at Marseille, Muséum d'histoire naturelle at Marseille

Albert Jean Baptiste Marie Vayssière (8 July 1854, Avignon – 13 January 1942, Marseille) was a French scientist, a biologist, specifically a malacologist and entomologist, i.e. someone who studies mollusks, and insects. Within the Mollusca, Vayssière specialized in sea slugs and bubble snails, i.e. marine opisthobranch gastropods. He made significant contributions towards a better understanding of the general biology, phylogenetic relationships, biogeography and ecological distribution of the group.

From 1873 to 1883, Vayssière served as a préparateur to the Faculté des Sciences at Marseille, where afterwards he was maître de conférences (lecturer). He later served as a professor of zoology, and in 1915 he was appointed director of the Muséum d'histoire naturelle de Marseille.

Vayssière was also interested in entomology, in particular, the field of agricultural entomology.

== Selected works ==
- Observations sur l'anatomie de Glaucus, 1875 – Observations on the anatomy of Glaucus.
- Recherches zoologiques et anatomiques sur les mollusques opistobranches du golfe de Marseille, 1885 – Zoological and anatomical research on opistobranches found in the Gulf of Marseille.
- Atlas d'anatomie comparée des Invertébrés, 1888-1890 (preface by Antoine Fortuné Marion) – Atlas of comparative anatomy of invertebrates.
- Recherches zoologiques et anatomiques sur les Opisthobranches de la Mer Rouge et du golfe d'Aden, 1901 – Zoological and anatomical research of opistobranches found in the Red Sea and the Gulf of Aden.
- Mollusques hétéropodes provenant des campagnes des yachts Hirondelle et Princesse-Alice, 1904 – Heteropod mollusks from campaigns by the yachts "Hirondelle" and "Princesse-Alice".
- Mollusques de la France et des régions voisines, 1913 (with Louis Germain) – Mollusks from France and neighboring regions.

Vayssière also made contributions to the publications Expéditions scientifiques du Travailleur et du Talisman pendant les années 1880, 1881, 1882, 1883 (scientific editors, Alphonse Milne-Edwards and Edmond Perrier) and Expédition antarctique française 1903-1905 (directors, Jean-Baptiste Charcot and Louis Joubin).
