= Deer by Water =

1861 painting by Gustave Courbet

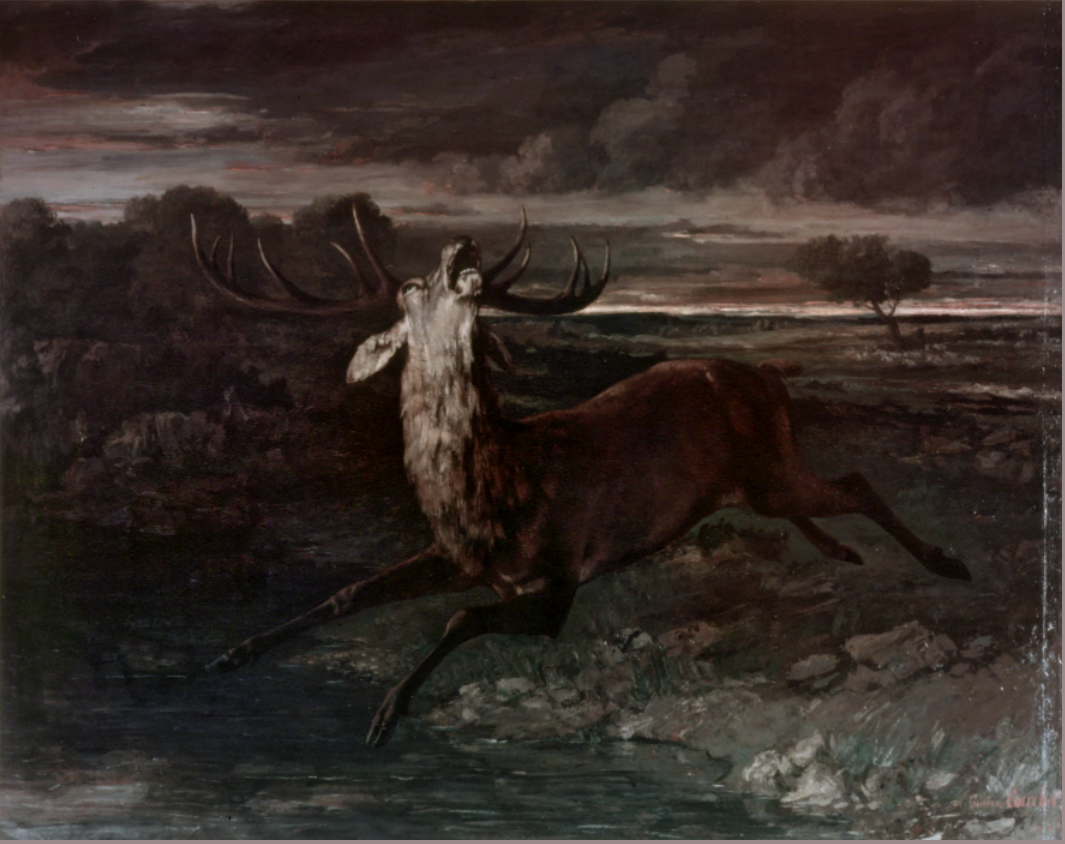

Deer by Water (French - Le Cerf à l'eau) or The Cornered Deer (Le Cerf forcé) is an 1861 oil on canvas painting by Gustave Courbet. It shows a deer pursued by a pack of hounds. It was exhibited at the 1861 Paris Salon and bought for the city of Marseille four years later, since when it has hung in the musée des Beaux-Arts de Marseille.
