= Étienne Peson =

French painter

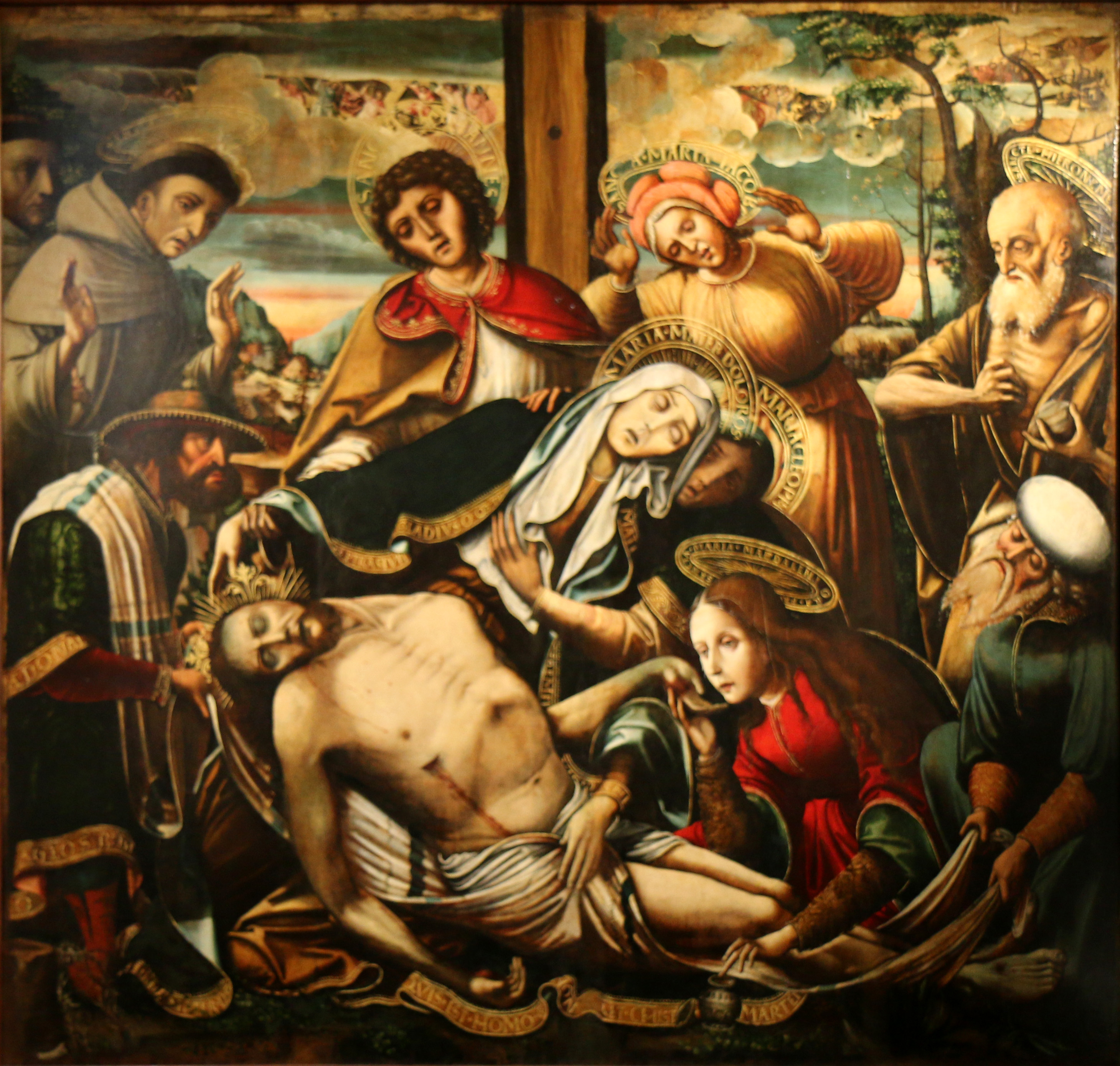
La pieta entre saint François et Saint Jérôme Musée des beaux-arts de Marseille

Étienne Peson (c. 1485–1551) was a primitive painter from Marseille, France.

== Biography ==
Étienne Peson was probably born between 1480 and 1490. Hie died in 1551. He married Jacomette de Crosille (or Jaquemette). They had three children who are known. A son, Jean, also painted. Two daughters, Delphine and Marguerite, both married on 30 March 1533 to Pierre Natte and Pierre Dodon respectively. His work is mainly known from different customer contracts that survive. They show that he had a flourishing career between 1520 and 1530.

== Works ==
Surviving works that are known to be by Étienne Peson are:

- La pieta entre saint François et Saint Jérôme in the Musée des beaux-arts de Marseille. This work is described in a contract of 16 March 1515 with Antoine Dupin for the church of Saint-Jérôme, Marseille area.
- The altarpiece for Olivier Monet, priest of Saint-Chamas, was painted by Étienne Peson. The sculptor is anonymous. This work, described in a contract of 25 January 1519, is located in the parish church of Saint-Chamas.
- A Pieta with St. Francis in the parish church of Pignans.
