= Palais Longchamp =

Palatial monument in Marseille, France

Coordinates: 43.3043°N 5.3945°E

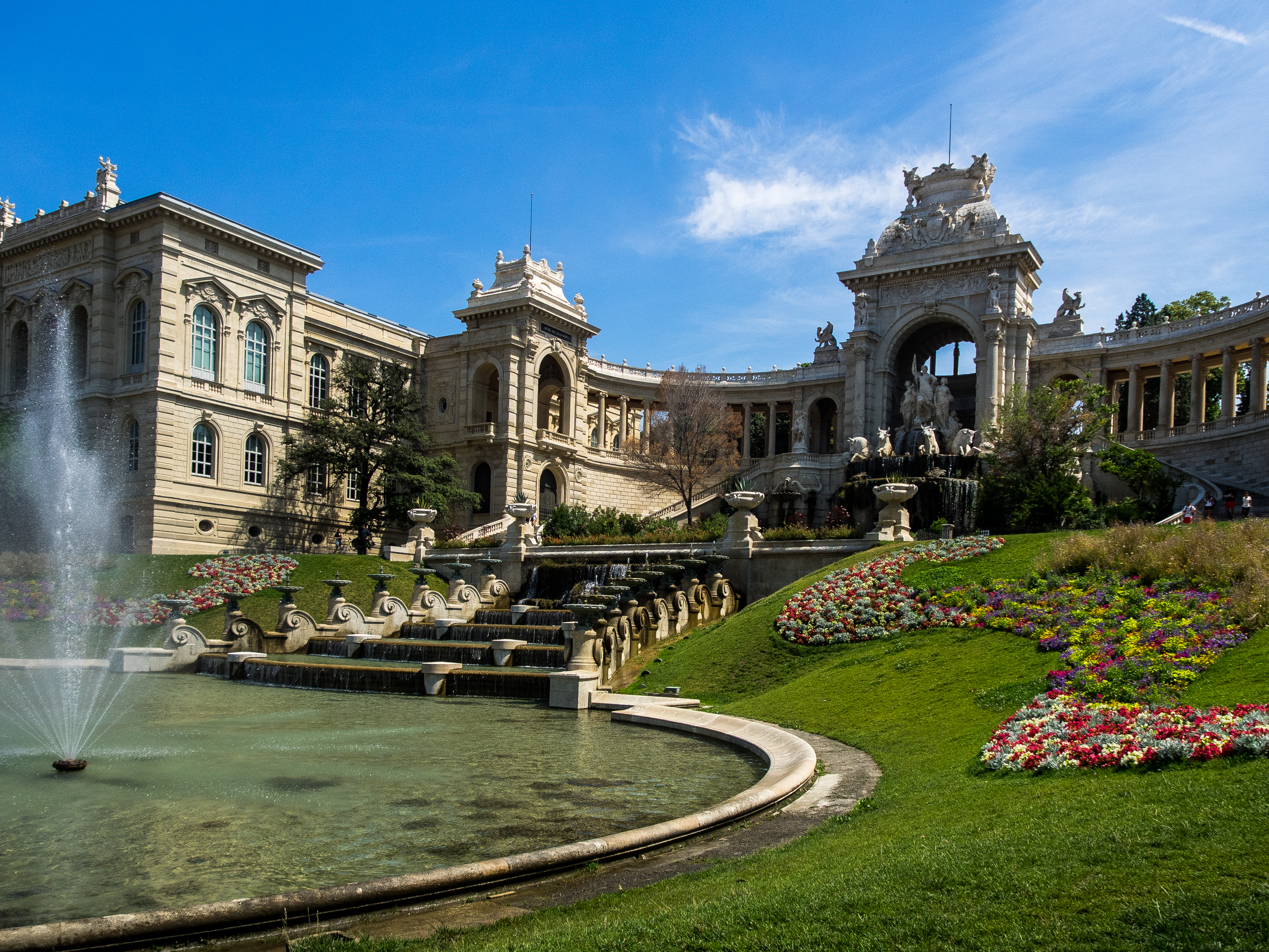
A view of the Palais Longchamp

The Palais Longchamp (French pronunciation: [palɛ lɔ̃ʃɑ̃]) is a monument in the 4th arrondissement of Marseille, France. It houses both the Musée des beaux-arts and the Muséum d'histoire naturelle de Marseille. The surrounding Longchamp Park (French: Parc Longchamp) is listed by the French Ministry of Culture as one of the Notable Gardens of France.

== History ==
The Palais Longchamp was created to celebrate the construction of the Canal de Marseille, which was built to bring water from the river Durance to Marseille. Although the foundation stone was laid by the Duke of Orleans on 15 November 1839, the building took 30 years to complete, partly because of the enormous expense and partly because of difficulties with local regulations. Designed by the architect Henri-Jacques Espérandieu, the building was centered on the structure and elaborate fountain known as the château d'eau ("water tower").

== Description ==
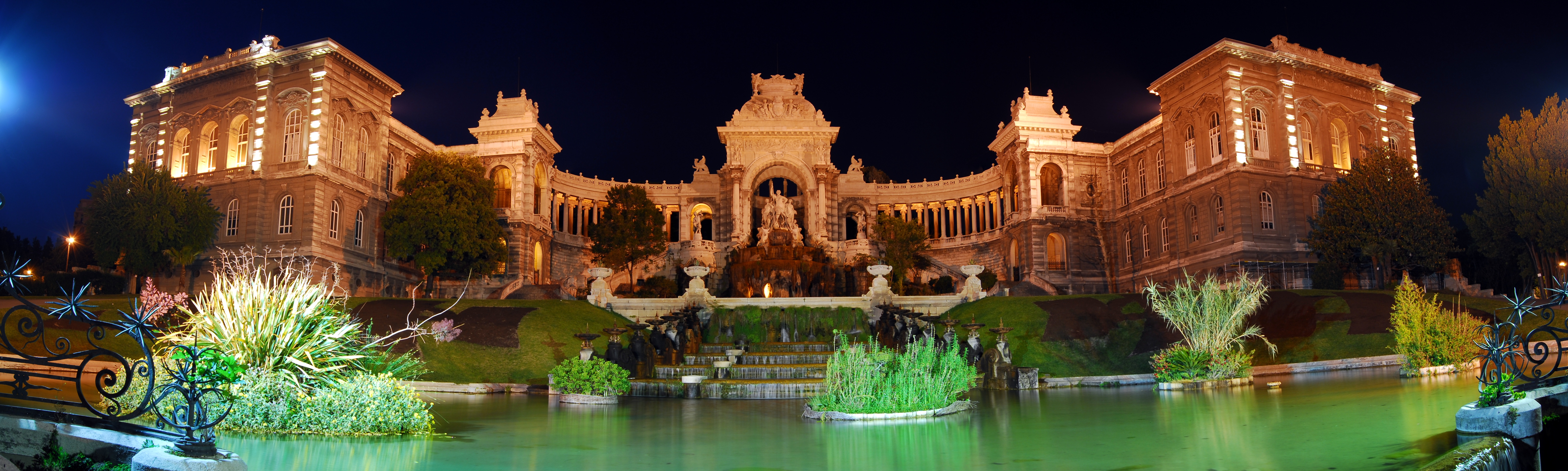
The Palais Longchamp at night

The Palais Longchamp has three main parts:

- The château d'eau
- The east wing, which houses the Musée des Beaux-Arts
- The west wing, which houses the Museum d'Histoire Naturelle

== Park ==
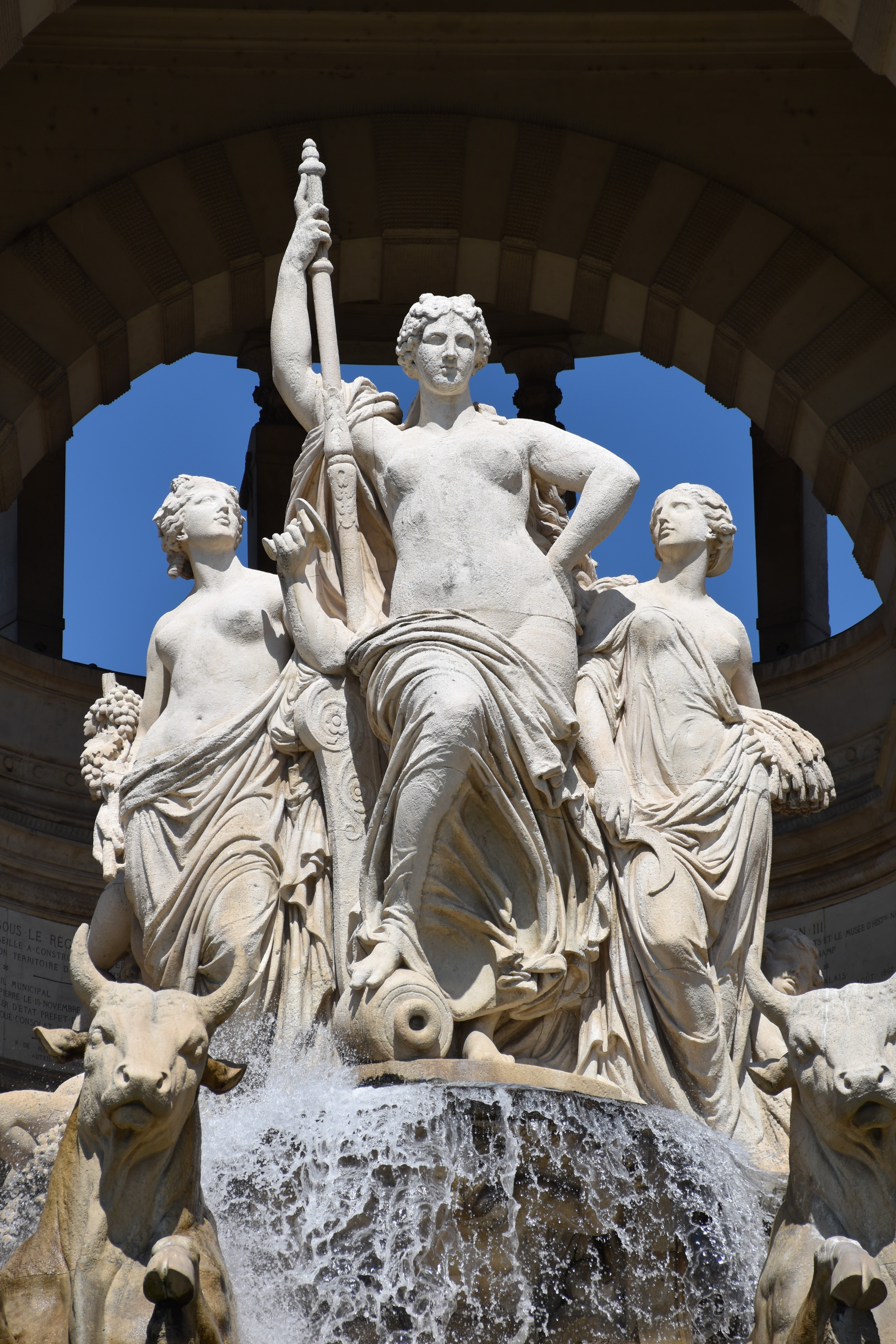
Jules Cavelier, The Durance, the Vine and Wheat, central sculpture group of the Palais Longchamp Fountain (1869)

Longchamp Park was opened in 1869, at the same time as the palace; in addition, the art and natural-history collections, which had been housed elsewhere, moved into the palace at this time. The park also contained a zoo, which was run by the city from 1898 until 1987, when, because of public disaffection with traditional zoos, it was closed.

At the summit of the fountain are sculptures of four large bulls and three women—a central figure representing the Durance flanked by one who represents grapes and one who represents wheat and fertility. Behind the women, within the central structure of the palace, is a manmade stone grotto decorated with carved stalactites and nymphs. From beneath the three women and from the bulls, water flows into a secondary basin, and then into an artificial pond. The water drains out of the pond into underground pipes, from which it emerges in a waterfall-like structure, and in twelve ornate bronze fountains lined alongside it, flowing into a second, larger pond.

The central feature of the garden behind the palace is a classic garden à la française, which is known as the Jardin du plateau. The garden also includes an English landscape garden, with winding alleys and many notable trees, including a 150-year-old plane tree and an oak and a Siberian elm that are both 120 years old.

The area that was occupied by the 19th-century zoo still contains many of its picturesque buildings in fantastic styles, including oriental pavilions for the giraffe and elephant, cages ornamented with Turkish tiles, and bear cages and seal dens decorated with rocaille, or rock-work.

== In popular culture ==
The music video of Soprano's single, "Ils Nous Connaissent Pas" was filmed at Palais Longchamp in 2014.

== Gallery ==
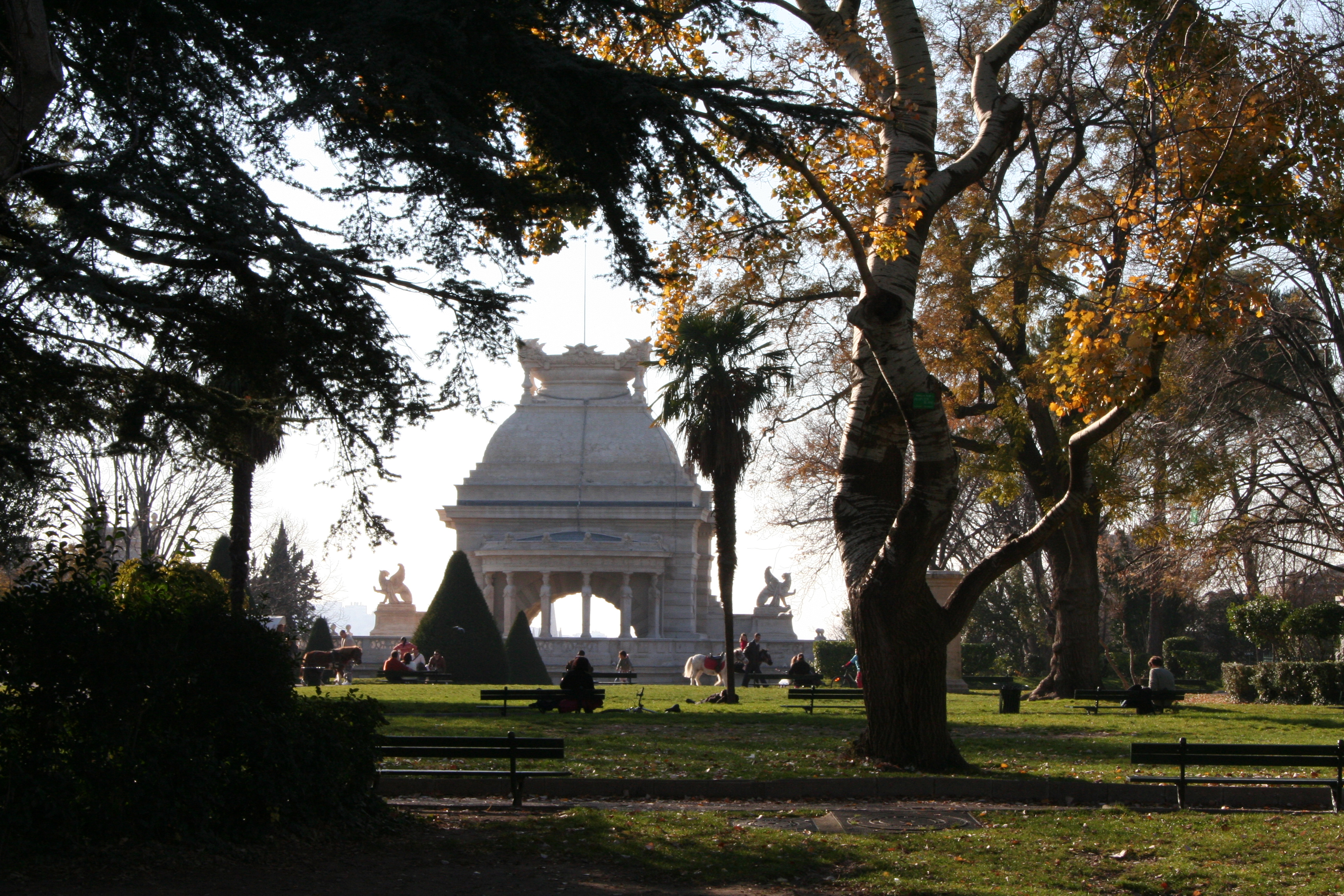
Jardin du plateau, Longchamp Park

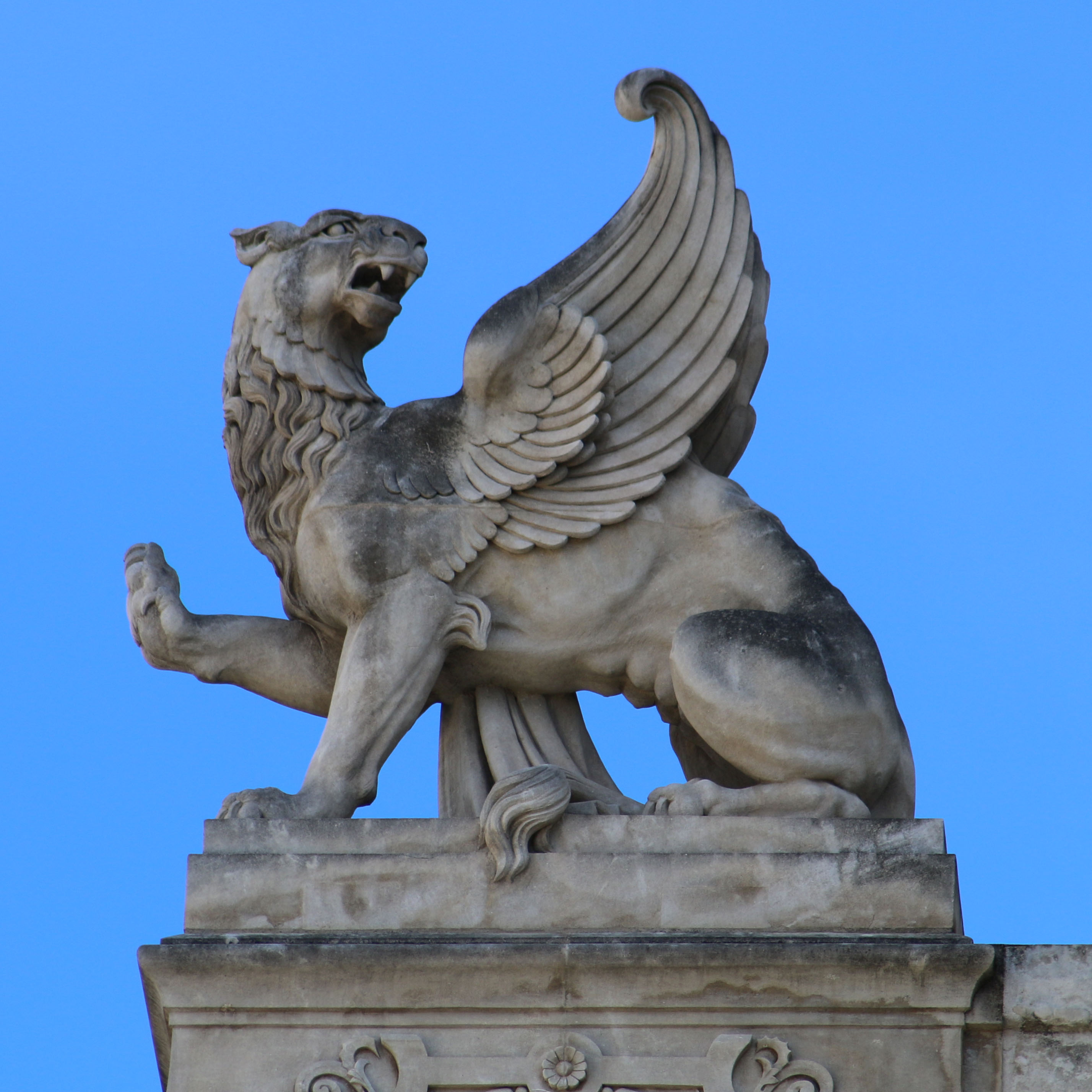
François Gilbert sculpture

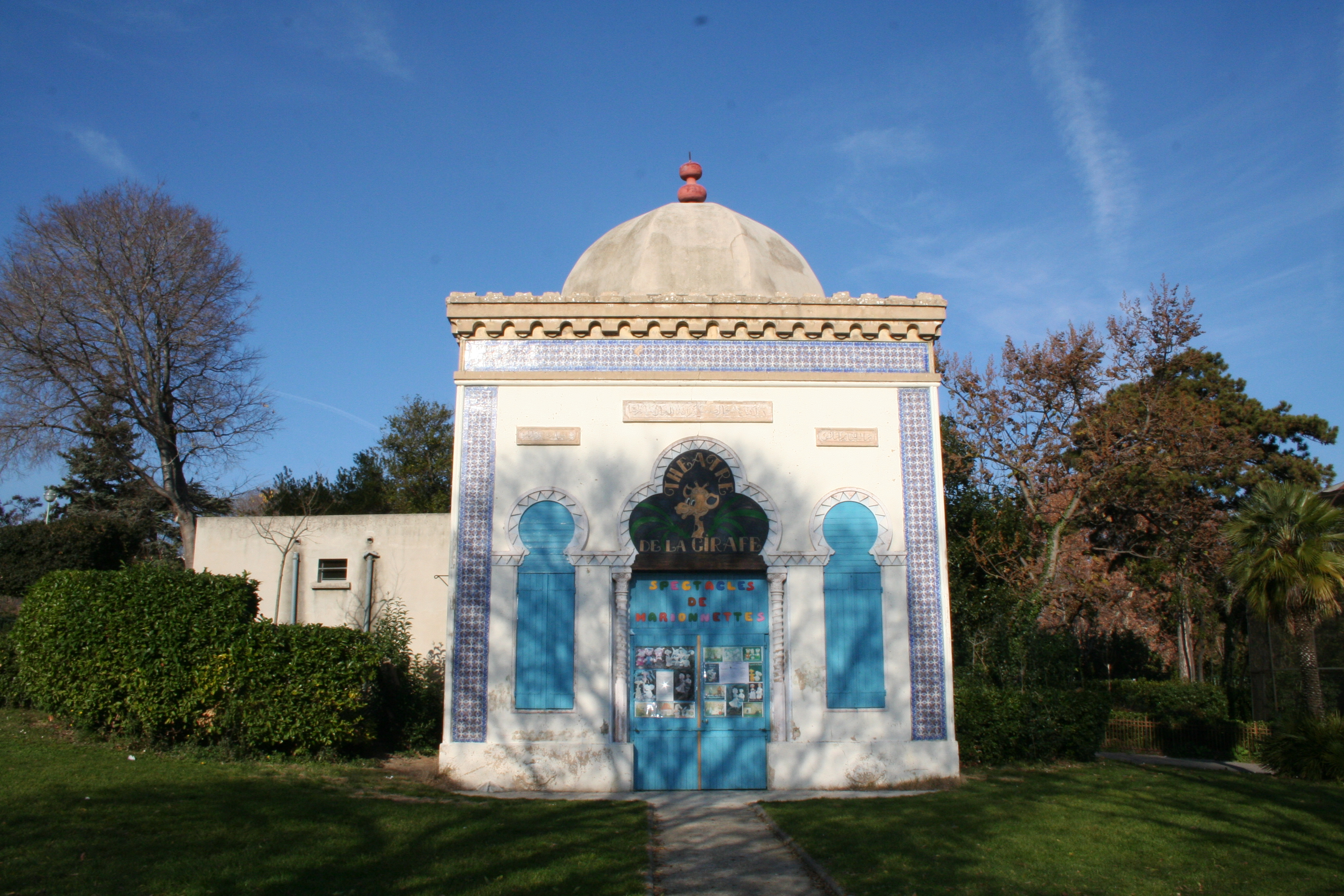
Former giraffe pavilion in the Parc Longchamp

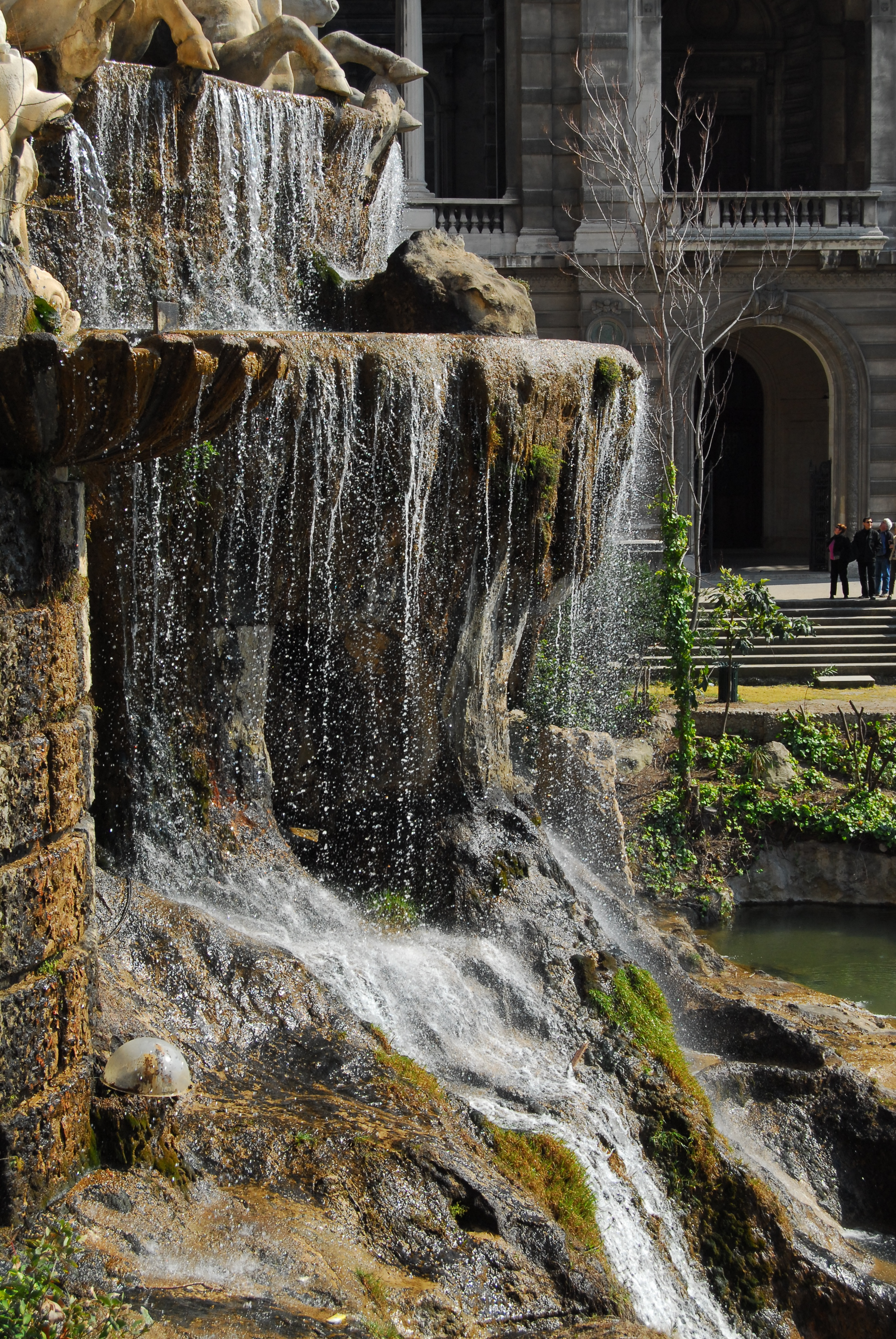
The fountain's secondary basin and middle balcony above the first pond

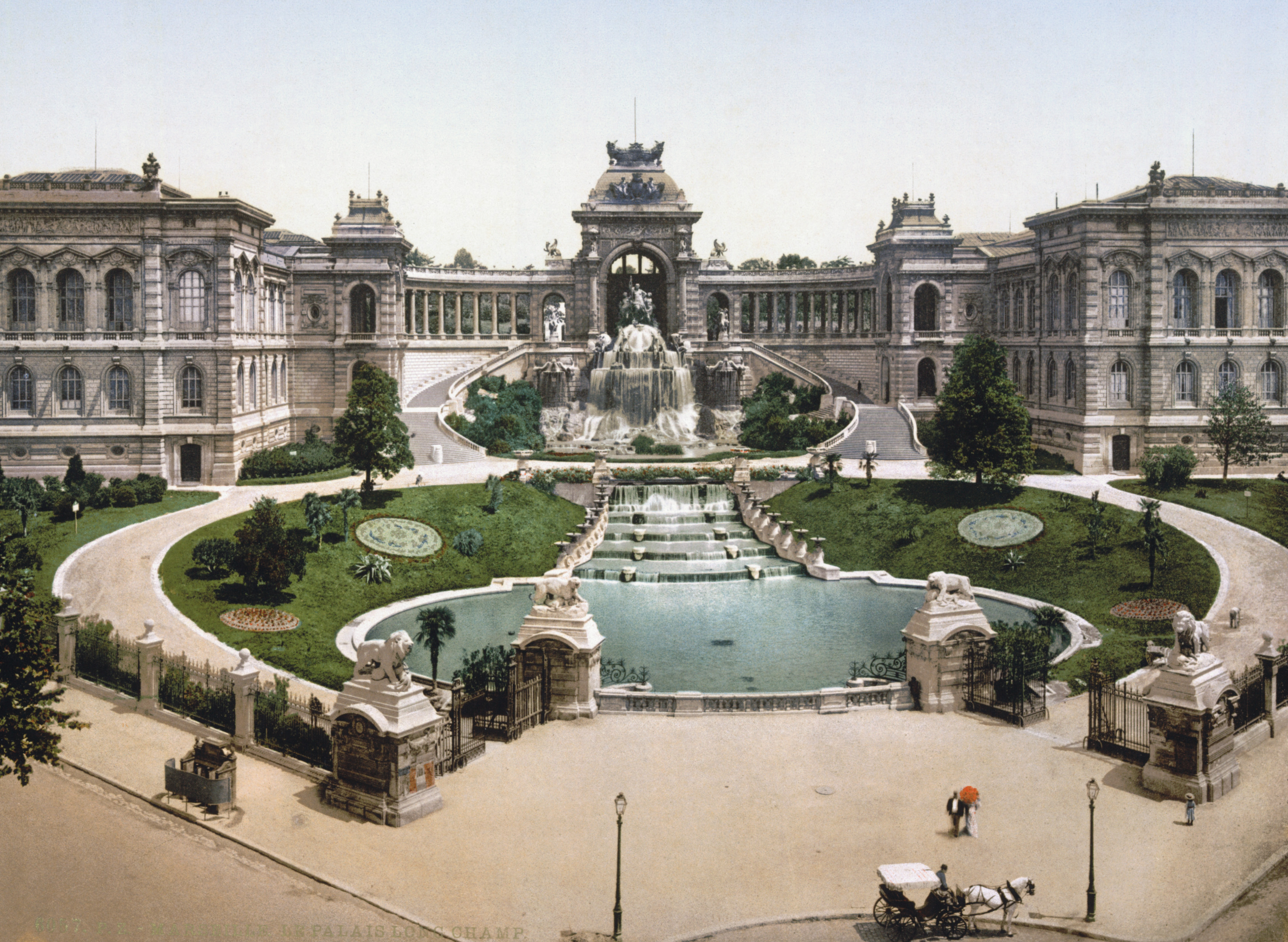
Longchamp around 1900

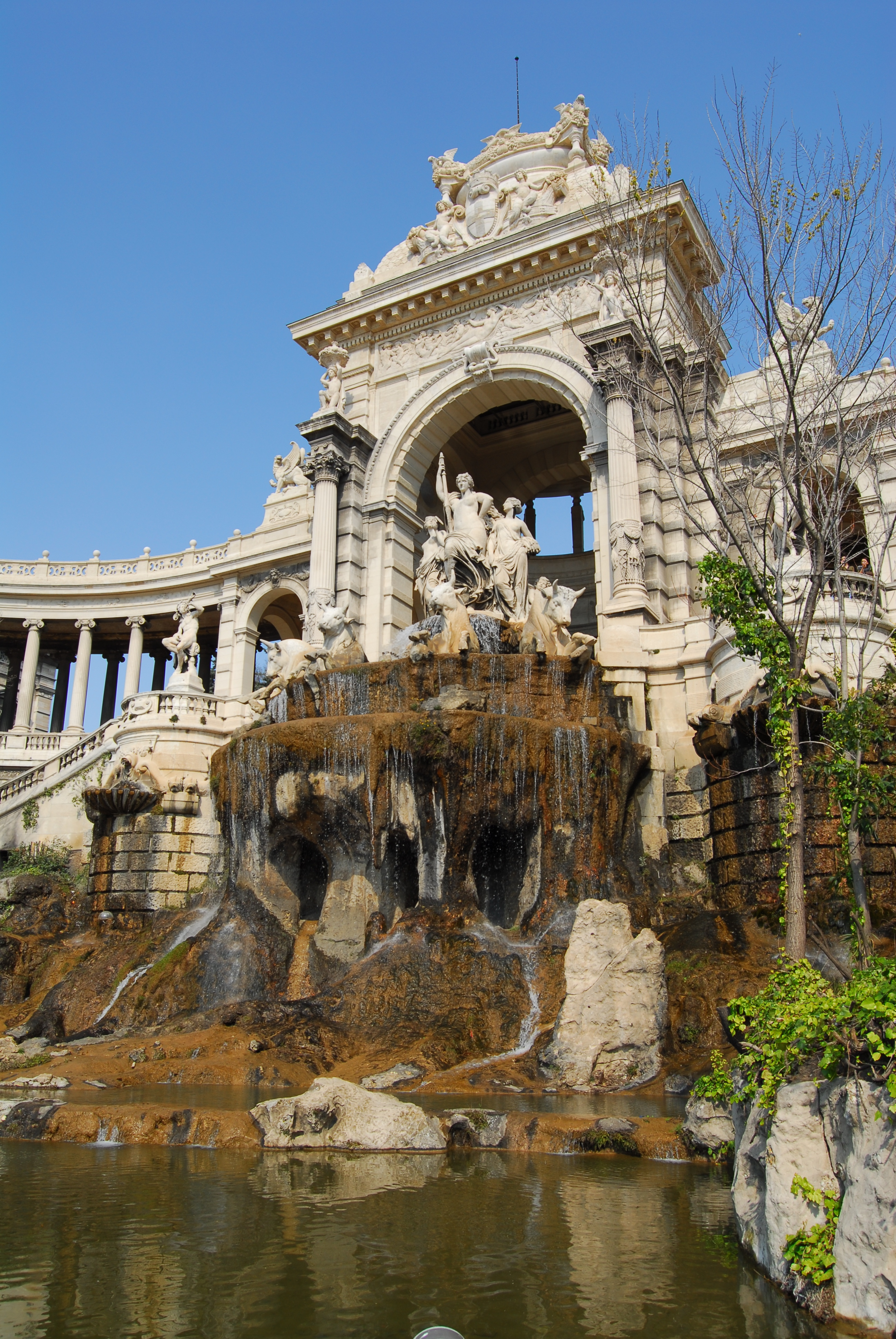
The château d'eau viewed from the middle balconies, looking toward the first pond and secondary basin

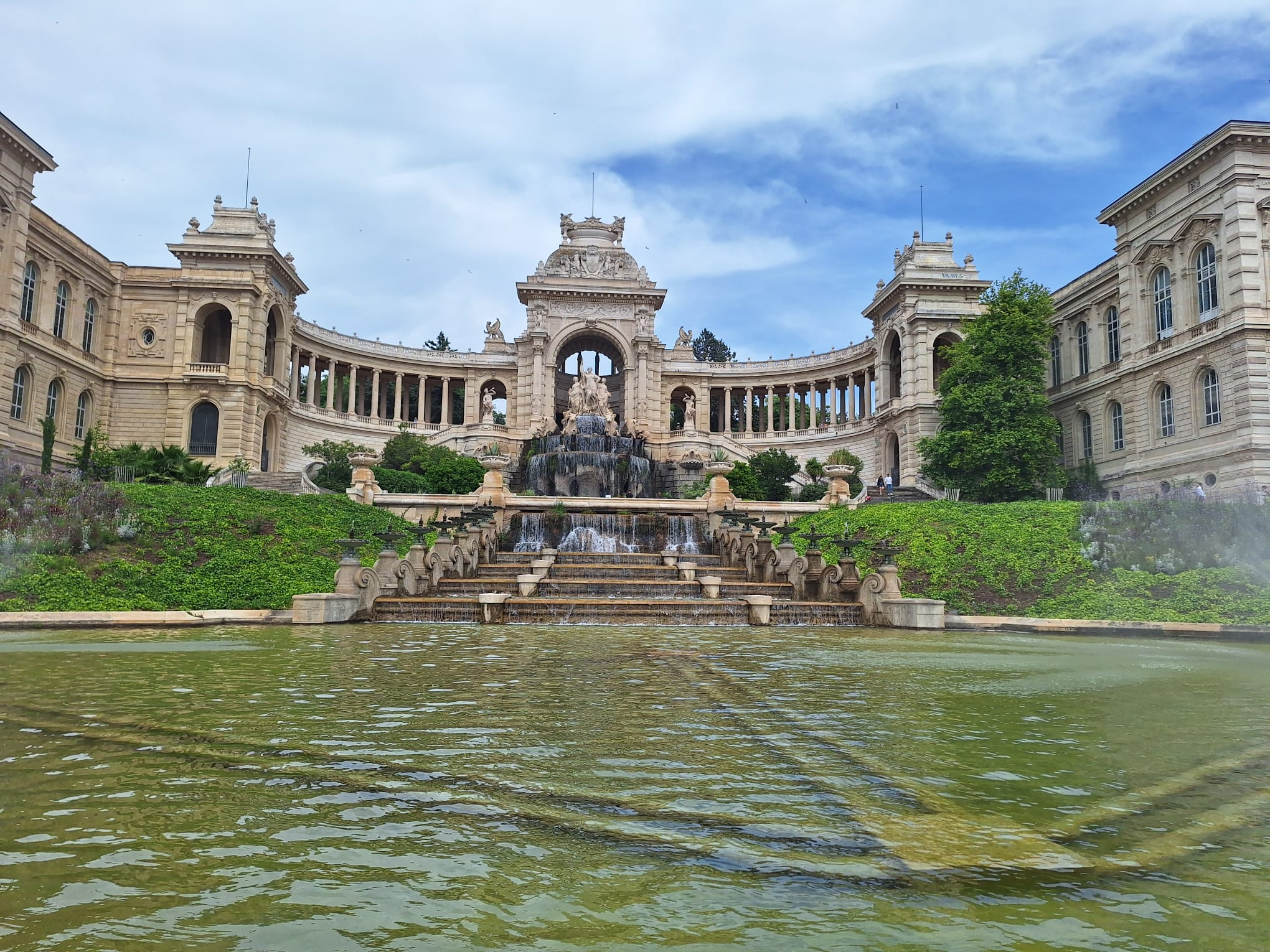
Palais Longchamp from the lower pool

== See also ==
- Marseille Observatory (Now an astronomical museum and planetarium nearby to the palais)

== Sources and citations ==
- Page from the site of the French Committee of Parks and Gardens
