= Marine Station of Endoume =

Research institute in Marseille, France

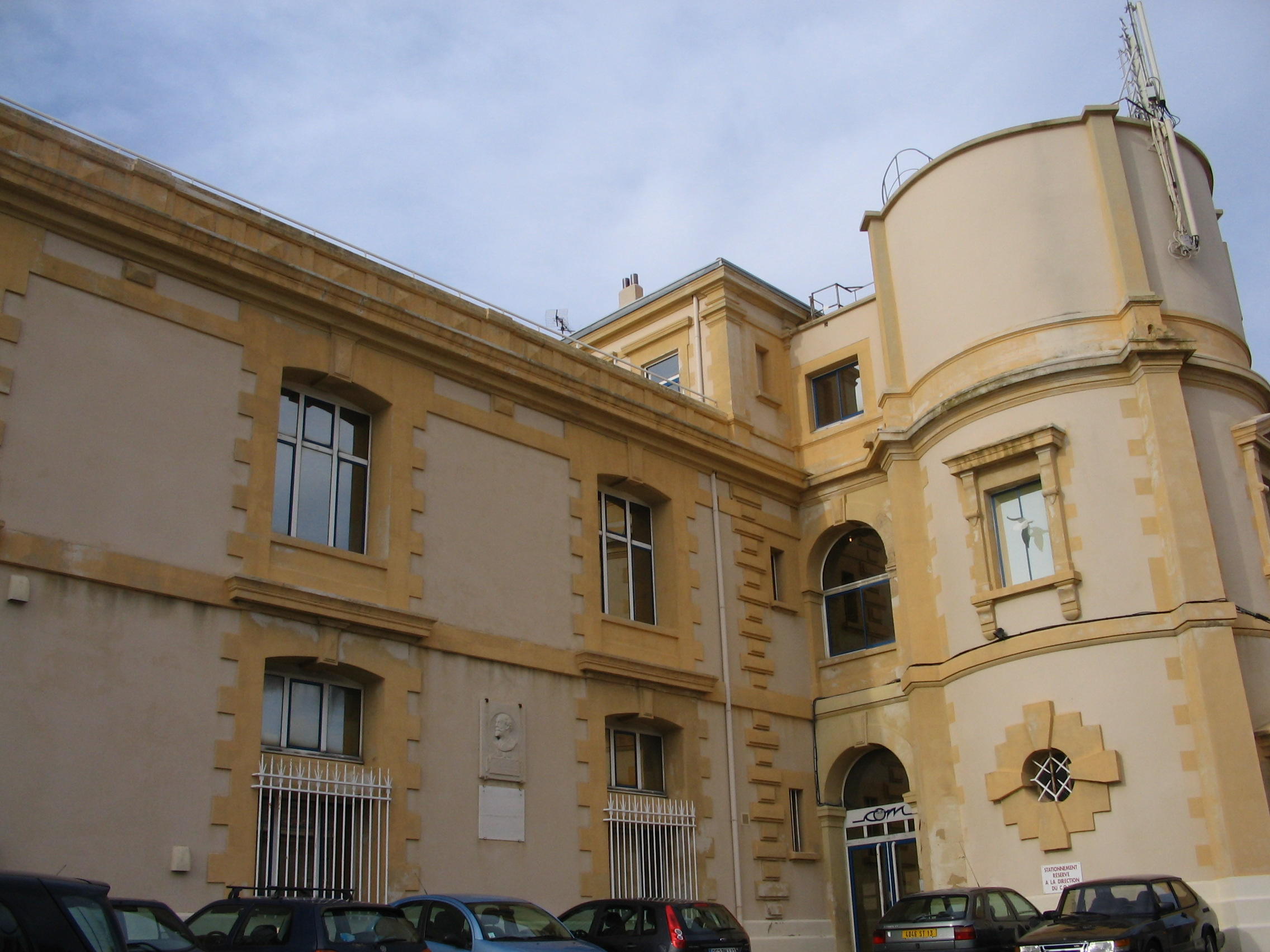
- The Marine Station of Endoume in 2009.
- Founder: Antoine-Fortuné Marion
- Established: 1882
- Focus: Oceanography; Marine biology
- Head: Ivan Dekeyser
- Endowment: CNRS, Aix-Marseille University
- Formerly called: Endoume Laboratory
- Address: Chemin Batterie des Lions
- Location: Marseille, France
- Coordinates: 43.2772°N 5.3771°E
- Interactive map of Marine Station of Endoume

The Marine Station of Endoume is an oceanography and marine biology research institute located in Marseille (France). It was founded in 1882 by Antoine-Fortuné Marion (1846–1900). It is today one of the sites for the joint research unit IMBE(Mediterranean Institute of marine and terrestrial Biodiversity and Ecology) hosting research teams from Aix-Marseille University and the CNRS.

== History ==
The first marine biology laboratory in France outside Paris was founded in Marseille in 1869. The project to build a marine station in Marseille was initiated by its director Antoine-Fortuné Marion in 1872 and accepted in 1882. The station was built between 1883 and 1889, on the site of an old artillery battery in the neighbourhood of Endoume. The first scientific studies started in the summer of 1889.

In 1891, the first public aquarium in Marseille opened at the marine station; in 1894, a marine natural reserve was created right in front of the marine station. A-F Marion was director of the station until his death in 1900.

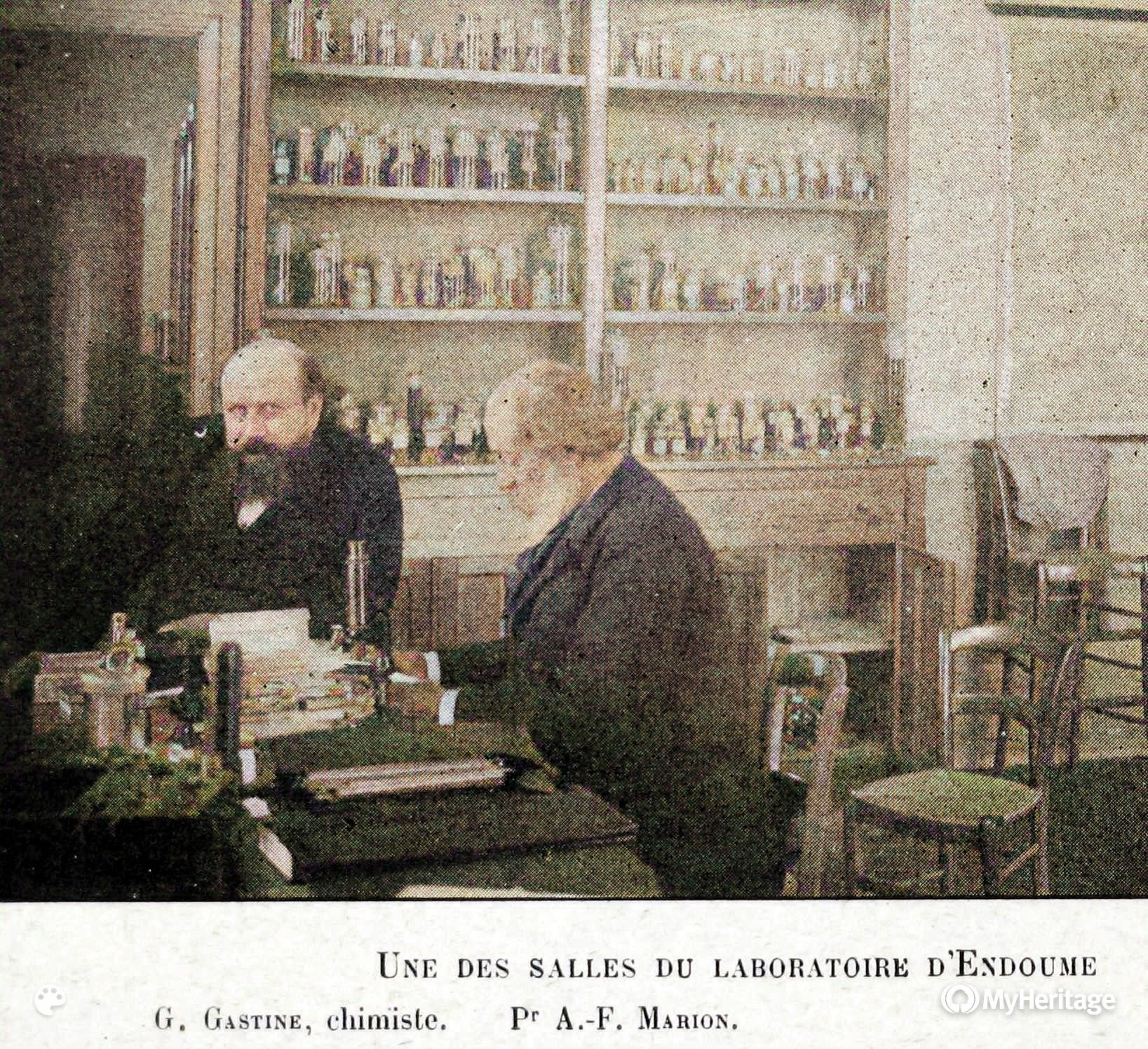
G. Gastine and Antoine-Fortuné Marion in a laboratory at the marine station of Endoume in 1897.

=== Directors ===
Name	Quality	Term
Antoine-Fortuné Marion	Professor of Natural science	1872–1900
Étienne Jourdan	Professor of Physiology	1900–1919
Gaston Darboux	Professor de Zoology	1919–1921
Albert Vayssière	Professor of Zoology, specialist of Opisthobranchia mollusca	1921–1924
Maximilien Kollmann	Professor of Zoology	1925–1948
Jean-Marie Pérès	Professor, member of the Institut de France	1948–1983
François Blanc	Professor	1983–1996
Lucien Laubier	Professor	1996–2001
Ivan Dekeyser	Professor	2001–2011

== Architecture ==
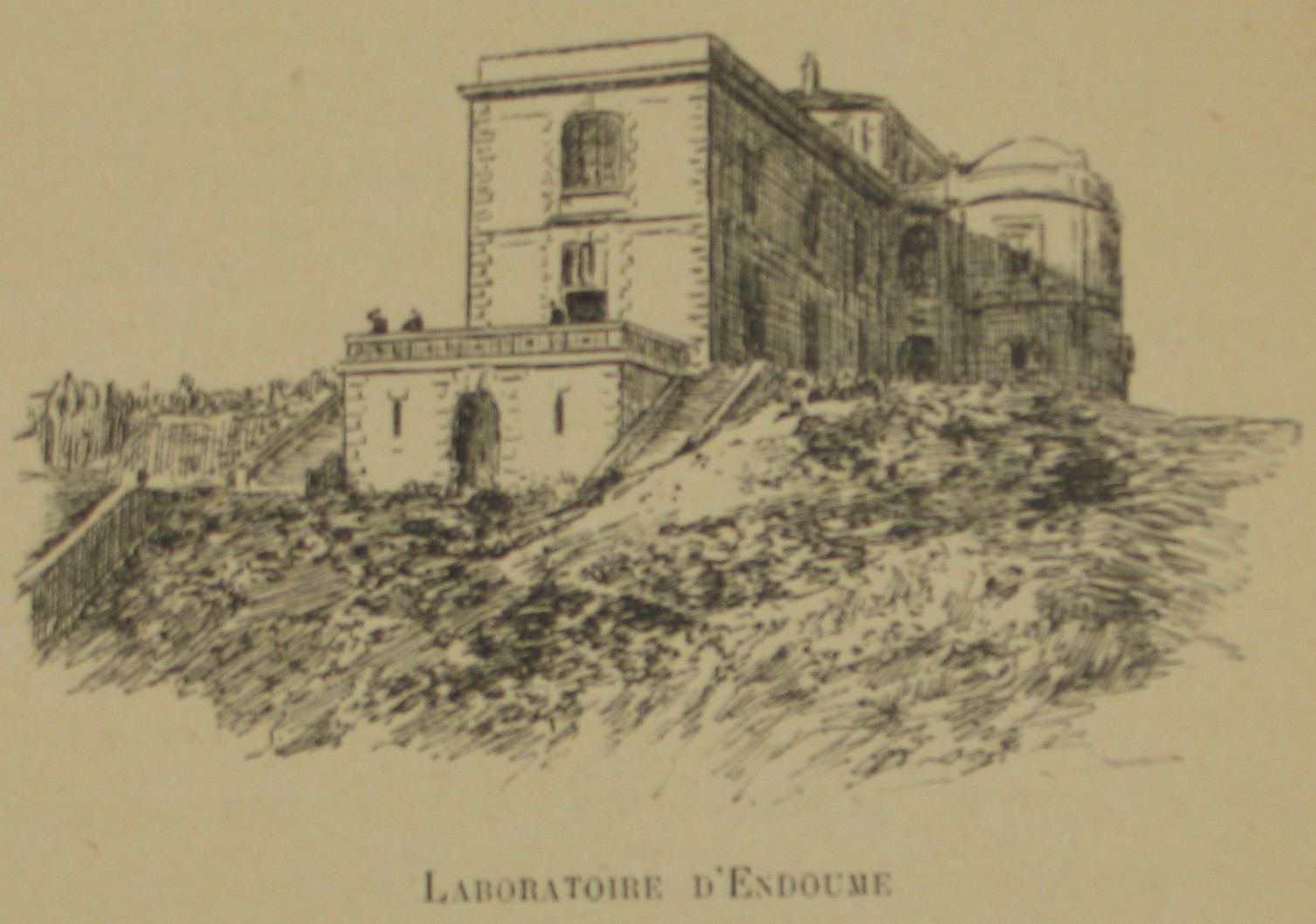
The Endoume Laboratory in 1897.

The original building had a single wing bordered, to its right, by a rounded turret containing the main staircase. It was extended to the left by a terrace flanked on either side by two stone staircases. Inaugurated in 1889 by Fortuné Marion, this original building was first restored in 1954 by Jean-Marie Pérès, and was succeeded by three other phases of construction:

- building 2 (1958), at right angles to the original building, on the seaward side: laboratories and private apartments of the Director of the station. The left exterior staircase, of which we can still find traces, was sacrificed on this occasion.
- building 3 (1963), 850 m2 extension, on the north side: laboratories, workshops, plankton net room and offices.
- building 4 (1966), a construction independent of the other three, with a surface area of 1,080 m2, overlooking the Anse des Cuivres: laboratories, conference room, practical workrooms and dining hall.
- building project 5, which was to have been located above the laboratory garden, never saw the light of day for lack of funding.

These successive constructions, may have increased the research capacity of the station, nevertheless they made the original building ugly. Patrick Arnaud stated: "It is quite unfortunate that the style of these buildings is so poorly matched to that of the original building, so ill-suited to the naturally picturesque coastal site, and unnecessarily motley."

On 12 October 1989, Jean-Marie Pérès and Robert Vigouroux, Mayor of Marseille, celebrated the centenary of the Endoume marine station, by unveiling a commemorative plaque located just below the profile of A.-F. Marion.

== Research ==
=== Endoume Benthic Bionomy School ===
In addition to the work prior to 1948, the marine station carried out between 1950 and 1982, under the leadership of Jean-Marie Pérès, work on benthic bionomics. The Marine Station has developed a long tradition of systematic biology and has housed renowned specialists in zoological groups such as sponges, annelids, lophophorates (brachiopods and phoronids) or bryozoa. Scientists from the Station, for example, have discovered for the first time a carnivorous sponge living in an underwater cave near Marseille. In 1985, the scientific journal of marine biology Tethys, published since 1969, was definitively suppressed, marking the end of what was known as the Endoume School.

In 2007, the Endoume marine station was threatened by a relocation project which aimed to abandon the historic building of Malmousque to bring together all the scientific activities of the Marseille Oceanology Center on the Luminy campus, inside the land. This project, which could be linked to real estate greed, then encountered strong opposition within the scientific community because it called into question the access to the sea necessary for many themes developed in this laboratory.

However, in 2011 the building was incorporated into the entity known under the generic name of Center d'Océanologie de Marseille, thus confirming the disappearance of the name Station Marine d'Endoume, as inaugurated in 1886 by A-F Marion.

=== Genetic and chemical research ===
From 2008, the Marine Station mainly housed the DIMAR laboratory but also components of the LOBP and LMGEM laboratories. The research carried out is part, in the long systematic tradition with the development of molecular phylogeny and evolutionary biology of development (evo-devo) applied to numerous groups of marine organisms such as sponges or chaetognaths. In recent years, New lines of research such as population genetics have been developed. The expertise of the station's scientists is also recognized In assessing the consequences of global warming and the impact of human activities on the environment.

Since January 2012, the renovated site has found a new attribution: it houses the IMBE. The MIO laboratory, headed by Richard Sempéré (CNRS Research Director), was created on January 1, 2012, following the merger of the three units LMGEM, LOPB and DIMAR.

In 2015, a new research platform with the acronym "MALLABAR" (Metabolomics Applied to the Study of Biodiversity marine) was inaugurated at the oceanographic station. This research platform aims to:

- 1) promote research on marine chemiodiversity with a view to sustainable development;
- 2) study the mechanisms at the origin of marine biodiversity and chemiodiversity [...] coupling traditional taxonomy, molecular barcoding and metabolomics;
- 3) explain the effects of disturbances on benthic ecosystems by environmental "metabolomics" and other "Omics" approaches (genomics, transcriptomics).

On this occasion the name Station Marine d'Endoume seems to have been given to the historic building.
