= Muséum d'histoire naturelle de Marseille =

Natural history museum in Marseille, France

Coordinates: 43°18′14″N 5°23′41″E

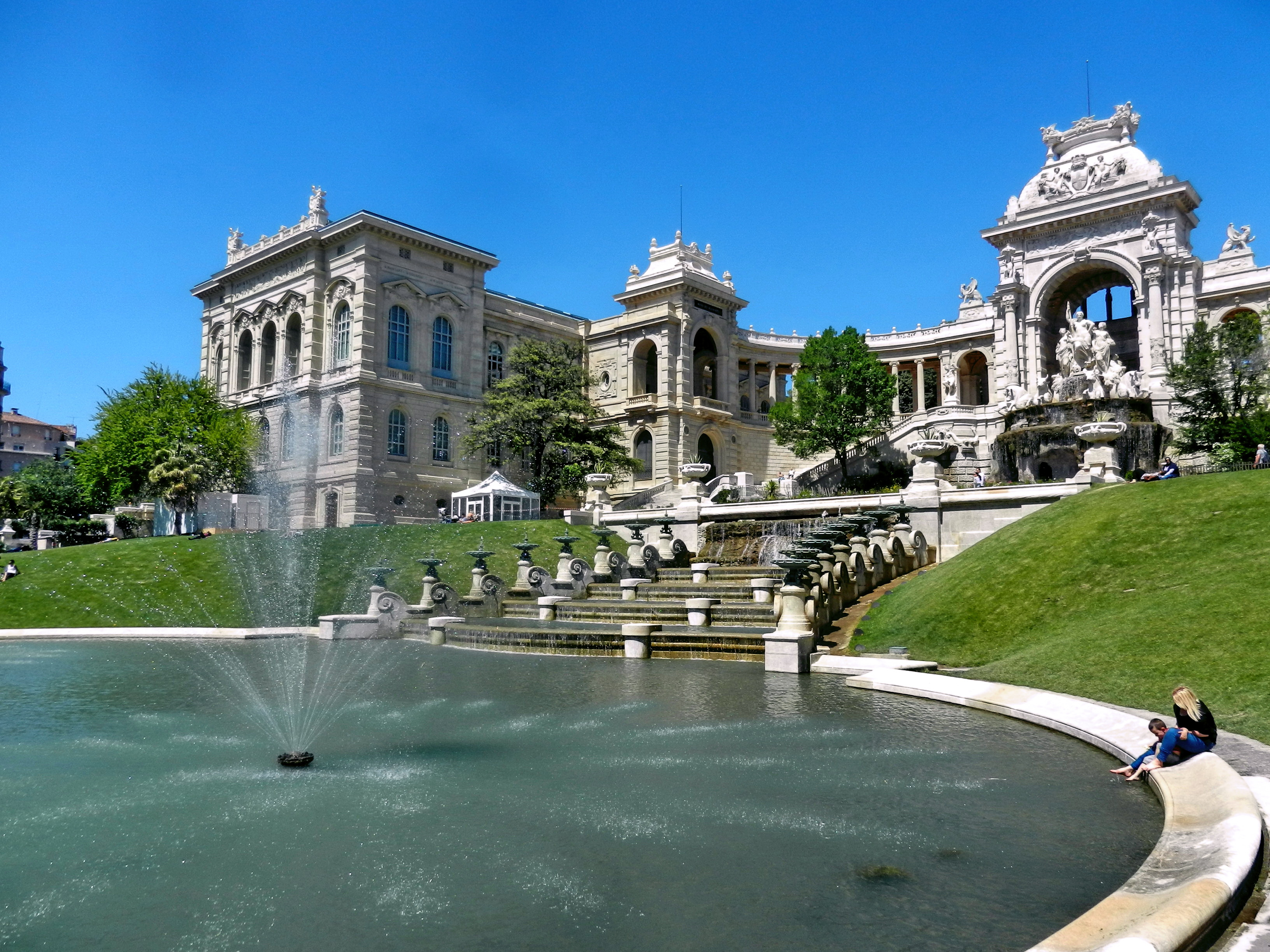
The Palais Longchamp, which houses the Muséum d'histoire naturelle and Musée des beaux-arts de Marseille

The Muséum d'histoire naturelle de Marseille, also known in English as the Natural History Museum of Marseille, is one of the most visited natural history museums in France. It was founded in 1819 by Jean-Baptiste, marquis de Montgrand and Christophe de Villeneuve-Bargemon, prefect of the Bouches-du-Rhône department. It is located in the Palais Longchamp, 4th arrondissement of Marseille, built according to the plans of Henri-Jacques Espérandieu.

Its museum abbreviation (used when giving identifiers to specimens) is MHNM.

== History ==
The museum was created in 1819. It has been located at various places, including the Chapelle des Bernardines, before settling in 1869 at the Palais Longchamp, which it shares with the Musée des Beaux-Arts.

The museum is now under the supervision of the Ministry of Higher Education and Research. It was classified as a museum of France in 2002.

== Exhibitions ==
The museum houses 83,000 zoological specimens, 200,000 botanical specimens, 81,000 fossils, and 8,000 mineral specimens. It was visited by 103,543 people in 2014.

The four exhibitions areas are:

- Salle safari (world fauna): section concentrating on accidental imports through the port.
- Salle de Provence (regional fauna and flora): section concerning Provence wildlife.
- Salle d'ostéologie: comparative anatomy.
- Salle de préhistoire, sur l'évolution: prehistory and evolution.

The museum also organises conferences and temporary exhibitions. Its best known director was naturalist Antoine-Fortuné Marion (1846–1900), in office at the end of the 19th century.
