= Antoine-Fortuné Marion =

French naturalist and painter (1846-1900)

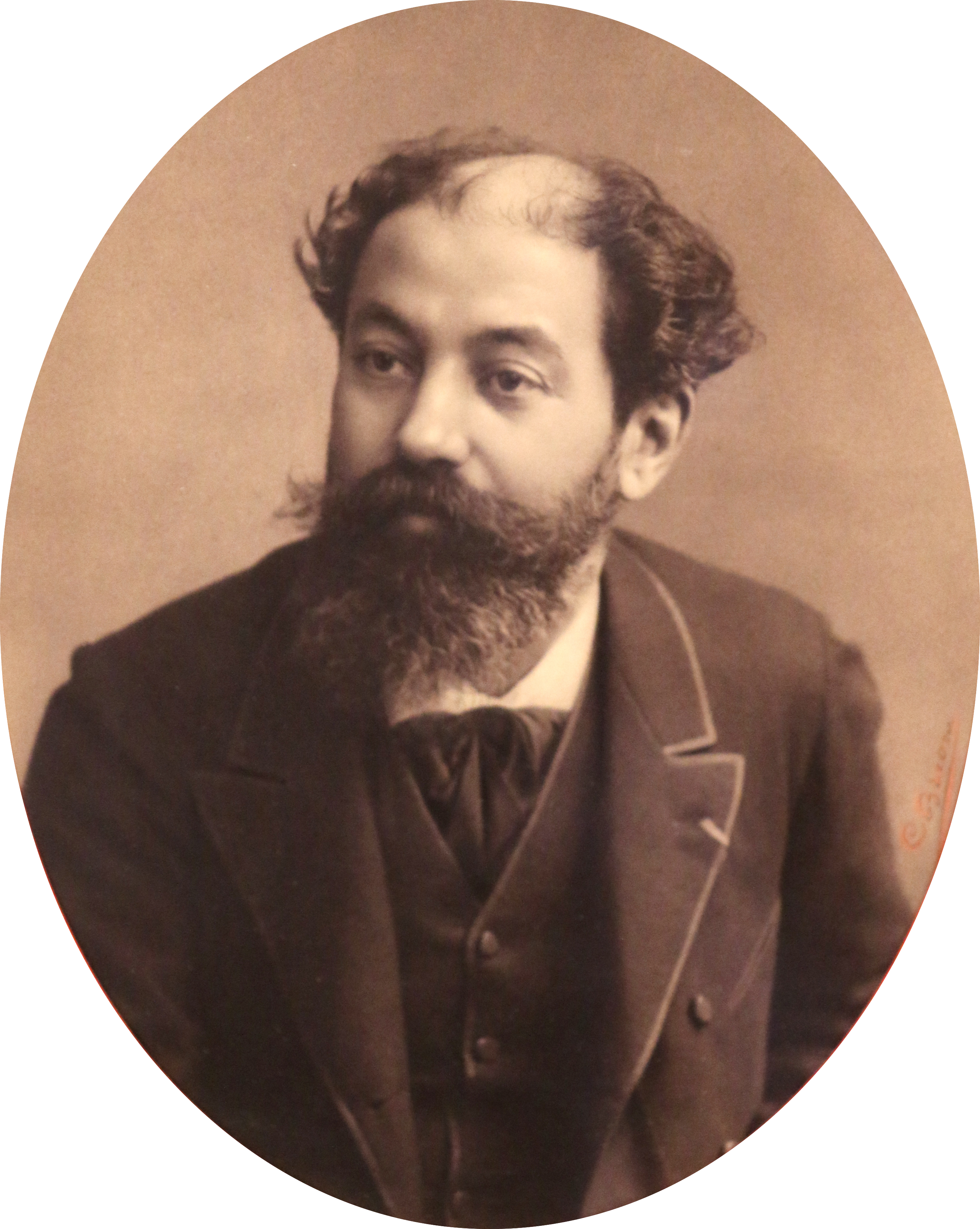
- Born: 10 October 1846; Aix-en-Provence, France
- Died: 22 January 1900 (aged 53); Aix-en-Provence, France
- Children: Marie Virginie Marion
- Scientific career
- Thesis: Recherches zoologiques et anatomiques sur des Nématoïdes non parasites marins (1870)

Antoine-Fortuné Marion (10 October 1846 – 22 January 1900) was a French naturalist with interests in geology, zoology, and botany. He was also a competent amateur painter.

A school friend of Paul Cézanne's in Aix-en-Provence, Marion went on to become professor and director of the Natural History Museum in Marseille. Cézanne painted his portrait in 1866–1867 at the Bastide du Jas de Bouffan.

He received his higher education in Marseille, earning his arts and letters degree in 1866 and his degree in sciences in 1868. In 1878 he opened a marine laboratory with financial assistance provided by the city of Marseille, which led in 1882 to the building of the Marine Station of Endoume. In 1880 he became director of the Muséum d’histoire naturelle de Marseille.

He was a good friend of Gaston de Saporta, with whom he collaborated on works in the field of botany. As a zoologist, his research included studies of segmented marine worms, free-living roundworms of the Mediterranean, nemerteans, rotifers, zoantharians, alcyonarians, parasites that affected crustaceans and investigations of the class Enteropneusta. As a result of his work in the fight against Phylloxera (an aphid-like pest), he was given awards by the French and foreign governments.

He was a founder of the publication "Annales du Musée d'histoire naturelle de Marseille".

His painting The Village Church now belongs to the Fitzwilliam Museum.

== Bibliography ==
- Premières observations sur l’ancienneté de l’homme dans les Bouches-du-Rhône, Remondet-Aubin, Aix, 1867, in-8°
- Recherches zoologiques et anatomiques sur des nématoïdes non parasites marins, Savy, 1873, in-8°
- Description des plantes fossiles des calcaires marneux de Ronzon, Haute-Loire, ibid. 1873
- Essai sur l'état de la végétation à l'époque des marnes heersiennes de Gelinden, Bruxelles, Académie royale (impr.par Hayez), 94 [1] in Mémoires couronnés et mémoires des savants étrangers, Académie Royale des sciences, des lettres et des beaux-arts de Belgique " Tome XXXVII (37), 1873, with Gaston de Saporta.
- L’Évolution du règne végétal : les Phanérogames, with Gaston de Saporta, Alcan, 1885
- La Station zoologique d’Endoume, Ollendorff, 1897
