= Henri-Jacques Espérandieu =

French architect (1829–1874)

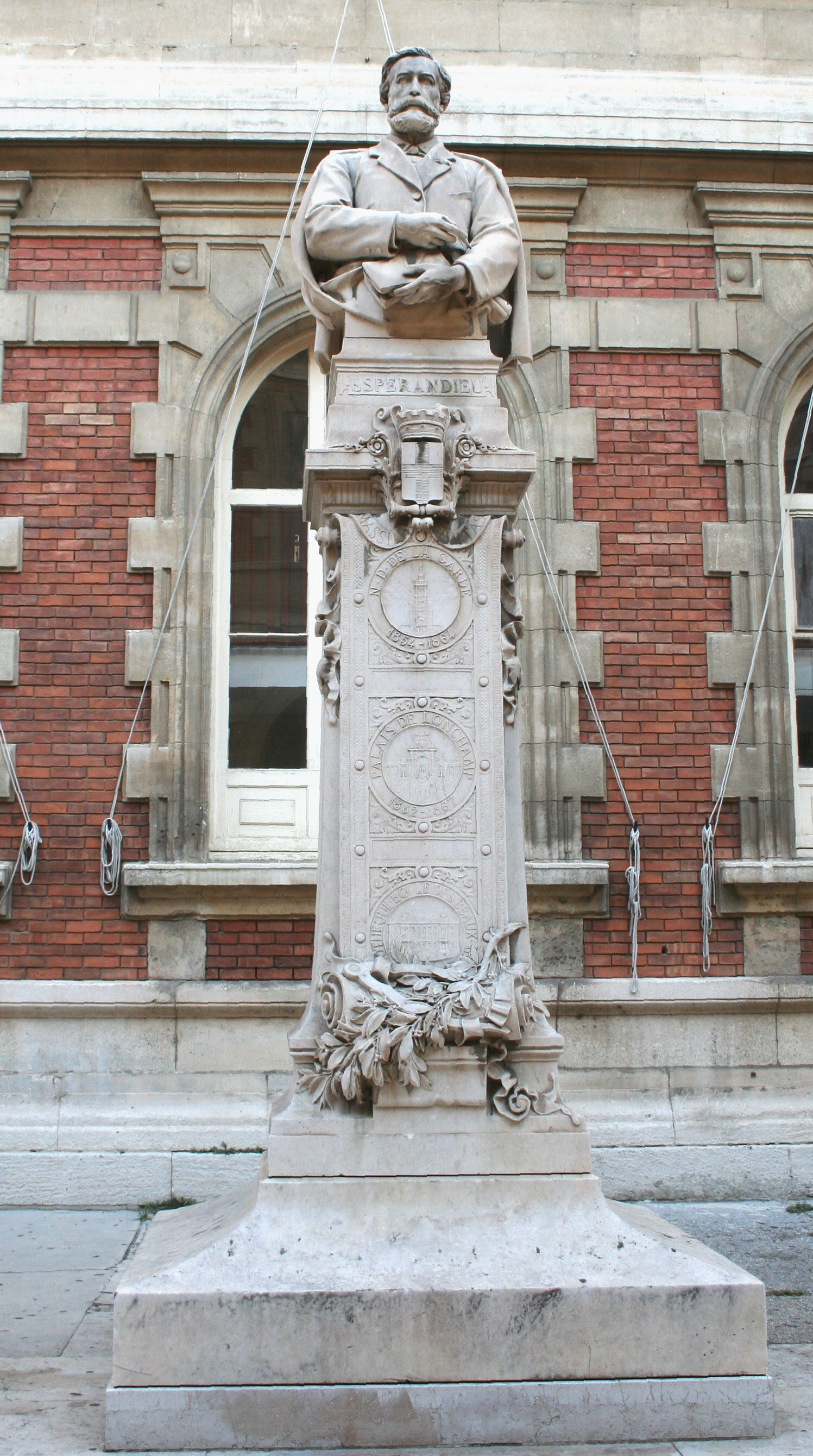
- Bust of Espérandieu by André-Joseph Allar at the Conservatoire de la musique in Marseille
- Born: 22 February 1829; Nîmes, France
- Died: 11 November 1874 (aged 45); Marseille, France
- Education: École nationale supérieure des beaux-arts
- Occupation: Architect
- Awards: Chevalier de la Légion d'honneur
- Buildings: Marseille Cathedral, Notre-Dame de la Garde, Palais Longchamp

Henri-Jacques Espérandieu (French pronunciation: [ɑ̃ʁiʒak ɛspeʁɑ̃djø]; 22 February 1829 – 11 November 1874) was a French architect who made his career in Marseille. He was responsible for some of the city's now most famous buildings, including Notre-Dame de la Garde (the "Bonne Mère"), Marseille Cathedral (the "Major") and the Palais Longchamp.

== Biography ==
Henri Espérandieu was born in Nîmes on 22 February 1829 to a Protestant family of modest means. At first he attended a Protestant school, where he was noted for his hard work. His father obtained a scholarship with which he entered the Royal College of Nîmes, where he showed a love for drawing and mathematics. He observed the construction of the church of St. Paul in Nîmes near his father's house, which triggered his interest in becoming an architect. Charles-Auguste Questel, a member of the Institute and architect of the palace of Versailles, supervised the construction of this church. His father arranged with Questel to get Espérandieu taken on by an architectural firm in Paris.

Henri Espérandieu left Nîmes on 23 October 1845 to go to Paris with his friend Ernest Roussel. He lodged with his uncle, a hotel manager in Paris, and in October 1845 joined the studio of Léon Vaudoyer. He enjoyed himself here, writing that it was a real pleasure to work in the workshops ... where the strongest helps the weakest. On 16 December 1846 he was admitted to the École des Beaux-Arts in Paris. He undertook paid studies to repay the financial contribution of his father, planning a railway station, a suspension bridge, a country house and others. In 1850, Questel took Espérandieu into his office and associated him in making the final drawings for the church of Saint-Paul de Nîmes. Questel was responsible for the maintenance of Versailles and for changes to the chateau, and associated him with this work and with monitoring the projects.

Beginning in May 1852, Espérandieu divided his time between workshops of Questel and Vaudoyer. The latter was responsible for construction of the Marseille Cathedral. The first stone was laid on 26 September 1852. Vaudoyer asked Espérandieu to be his representative on site. The official appointment of Espérandieu to oversee the work of the Cathedral was made on 22 May 1854. This was the beginning of his brilliant career as an architect in Marseille, (Note: His hometown did not offer Espérandieu the opportunity to do any buildings. There was a very interesting project for the church of Saint-Baudile de Nîmes where he was sidelined by a Catholic jury of dubious impartiality.) where he settled in 1855.

== Works ==
Henri Espérandieu's main works were the following:

=== Marseille Cathedral ===
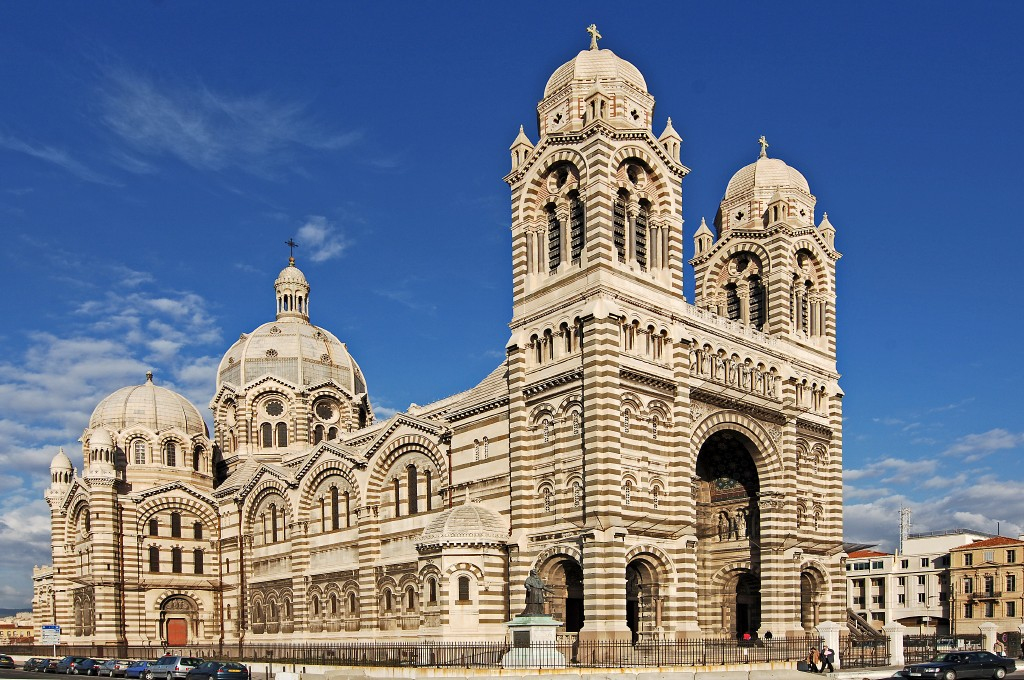
Marseille Cathedral

Henri Espérandieu was director of construction of the Cathédrale Sainte-Marie-Majeure in Marseille. On the death of the architect Vaudoyer on 9 February 1872 he was made responsible for prosecution of the work, but only survived his master by two years.

=== Palais Longchamp ===
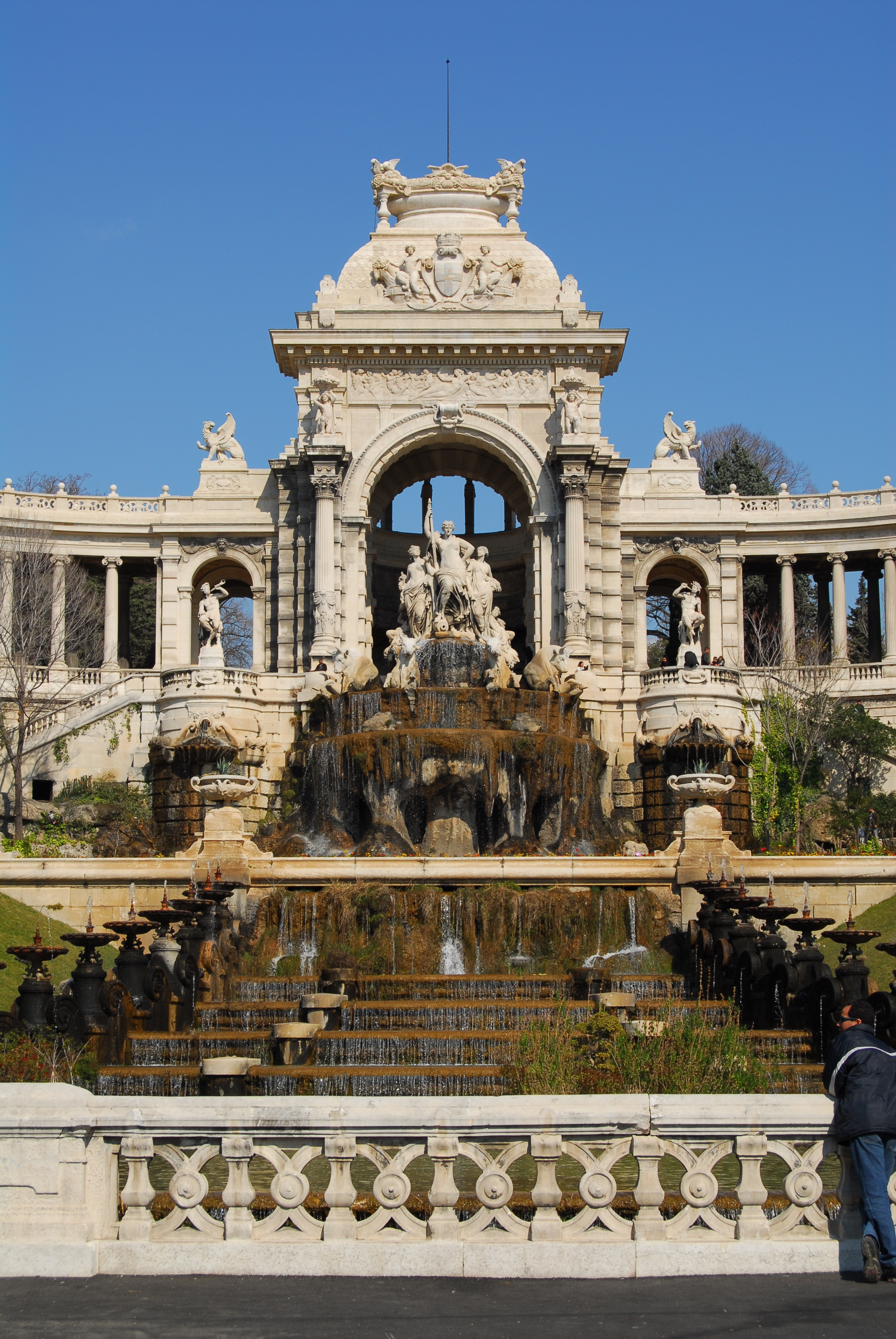
Palais Longchamp in Marseille

Henry Espérandieu was the designer and director of construction of the Palais Longchamp, sited at the water tower where the water arrives from the Canal de Marseille, housing the Museum of Fine Arts and the Natural History Museum. A first plan was submitted by Jean-Charles Danjoy (1806-1862), a celebrated architect who had directed construction of the Château Pastré. In early 1859, the mayor Jean-François Honnorat asked the sculptor Frédéric Auguste Bartholdi, who had won a competition for a fountain in Bordeaux, to submit a plan for the main monument. Four proposals were submitted but none were accepted.

After thinking of calling on Pascal Coste, in August 1861 the mayor Jules-Joseph-Félix-Théodore Onfroy asked the young architect Henri Espérandieu undertake this major work. Bartholdi's dismissal caused violent arguments. He put everyone he knew in the Parisian press to work pressing for his ownership of the project, which would be one of the masterpieces of nineteenth century architecture. But although his cause was championed by Raymond Poincaré, Bartholdi was dismissed by all jurisdictions.

=== Notre-Dame de la Garde ===
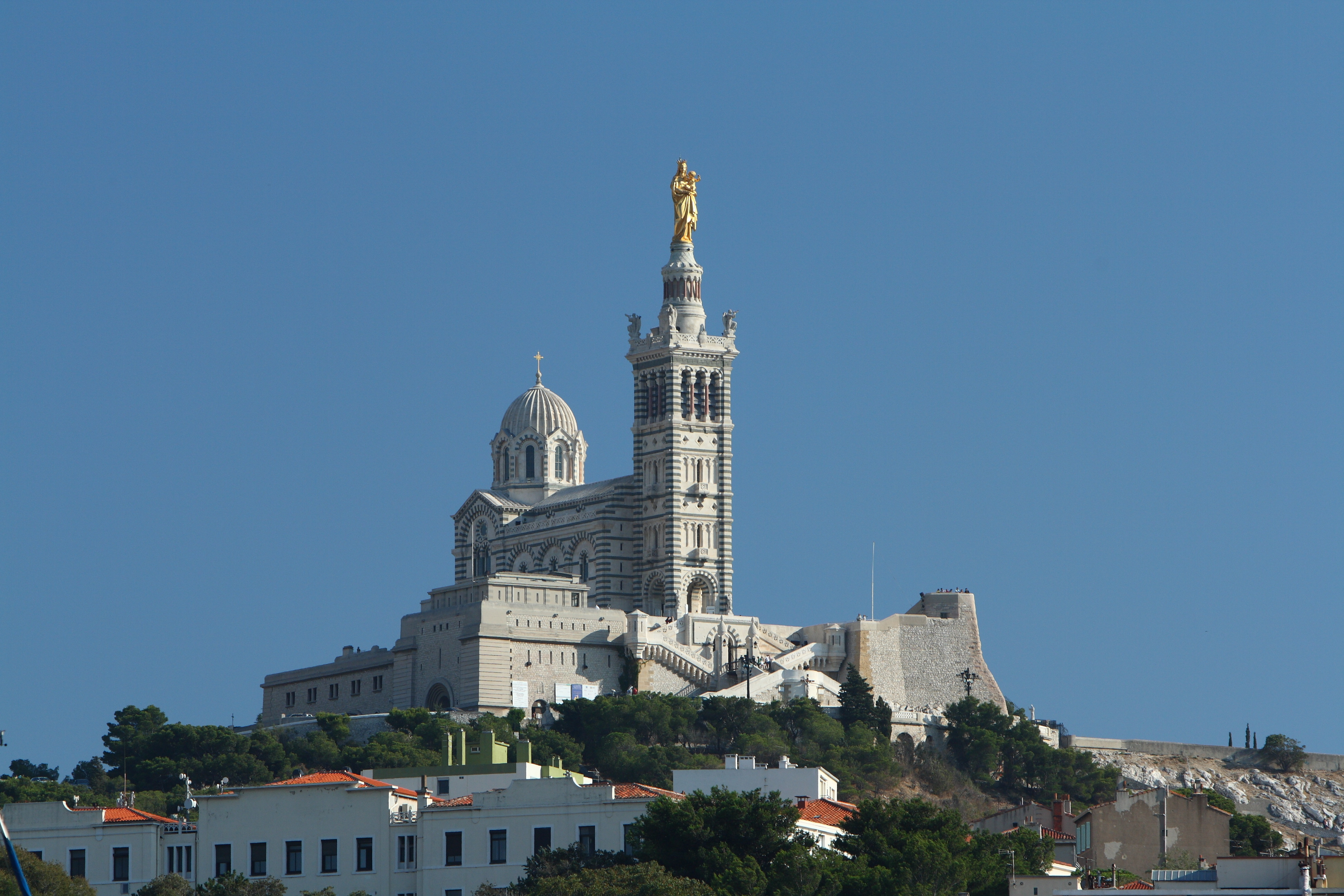
Notre-Dame de la Garde in Marseille

Construction of the basilica of Notre-Dame de la Garde lasted 21 years and was still unfinished at the death of the architect. This construction was originally an enlargement of the medieval chapel, but was transformed, at the request of Father Bernard, chaplain and director of the sanctuary, into the creation of a new sanctuary. On 30 December 1852, the Board of Directors, chaired by Bishop Eugène de Mazenod, approves the "Roman Byzantine" project presented by Vaudoyer's workshop. The plans were made and developed by Espérandieu and Vaudoyer simply served as nominee. The reason is probably that Vaudoyer feared concern about his pupil and collaborator due to his youth, his lack of reputation, but also and especially his Protestant religion. Leon Vaudoyer confirmed in a letter that he had nothing to do with the design or execution of this monument, of which Espérandieu was the only real author. (Note: "Je suis entièrement étranger à la conception comme à l’exécution de ce monument dont Espérandieu est le seul et véritable auteur.")

=== Le palais des Arts ===
The construction of the Palace of Arts was decided by the municipal council on 7 March 1859 . The author of the project was Espérandieu, while the works were conducted by Gaudensi Allar, elder brother of the sculptor André-Joseph Allar.

=== La vierge dorée ===
The monument of the Golden Virgin was raised to celebrate the immaculate conception. Espérandieu drew up the plans for this monument, which was placed at the end of the boulevard d’Athènes, and then moved to the corner of the Rue des héros and boulevard Voltaire to make room for the Gare de Marseille-Saint-Charles and its monumental staircase .

== Death ==
Espérandieu died on 11 November 1874 at only 45 years of age from pneumonia contracted in the crypt of Notre-Dame de la Garde. His mortal remains were transferred from his home at 59 Rue Saint-Ferréol to the Gare de Marseille-Saint-Charles for burial in the Protestant cemetery in Nîmes, where his childhood friend, Ernest Roussel, delivered the eulogy. He was a Knight of the Legion of Honour.

A street in Marseille located near the Palais Longchamp bears his name, as does a ship of the Friuli line. In the courtyard of the Palace of Arts a monument to his memory was erected, composed of his bust sculpted by André-Joseph Allar on a pedestal decorated with medallions representing his major works by Joseph Letz.
