= Musée des beaux-arts de Marseille =

Museum in Marseille, France

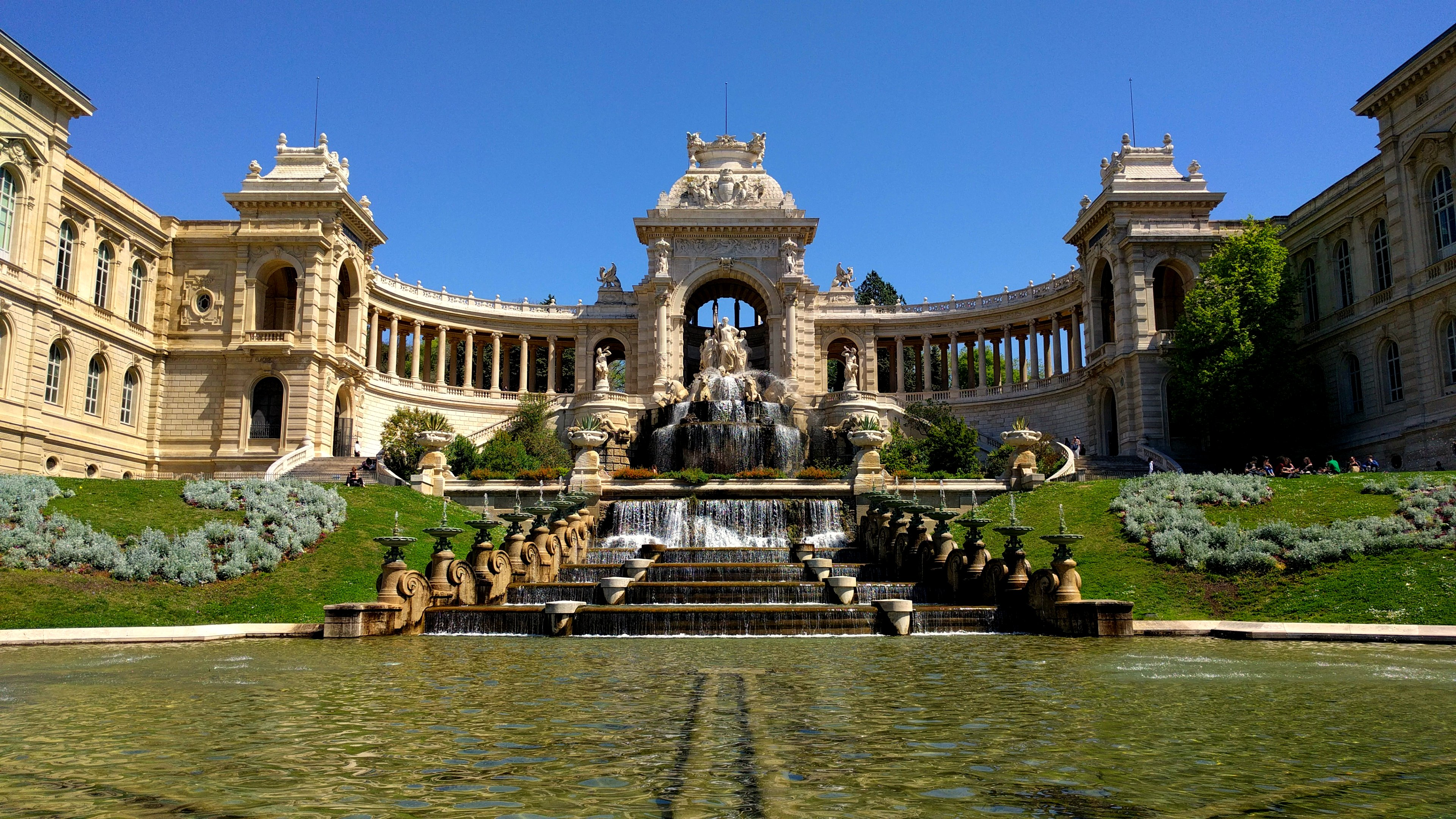
- The Palais Longchamp, which houses the Musée des beaux-arts and Muséum d'histoire naturelle de Marseille
- Interactive fullscreen map
- Established: 1801
- Location: Marseille, France
- Coordinates: 43°18′17″N 5°23′38″E
- Collection size: Paintings, sculptures, drawings
- Website: musee-des-beaux-arts.marseille.fr

The Musée des beaux-arts de Marseille (Occitan: Museu dels bels arts de Marselha) is one of the main museums in the city of Marseille, in the Provence-Alpes-Côte d'Azur region. It occupies a wing of the Palais Longchamp, and displays a collection of paintings, sculptures and drawings from the 16th to 19th centuries.

== History ==
The museum is one of five created by the Consulate in 1801, in the main cities of France. The basis for the collection was the seizure by revolutionaries of state property after the consular decree of 1 September 1800. Successive deposits of state property were made in 1814, 1817, and 1819, and throughout the rest of the 19th century. In 1856, the Borély collection was acquired by the museum. In 1869, the museum moved into the left wing of the Palais Longchamp. After more than 130 years of existence, a complete renovation of the Palais Longchamp and the museum was necessary. A long restoration started in 2005, and completed in June 2013, has restored all its luster to this complex.

== Building ==
The museum is located in the right wing of the Palais Longchamp, built by the architect Henri-Jacques Espérandieu between 1862, and 1869 to commemorate the arrival in the city of waters of the Durance river through the Canal de Marseille. The building has been designated a Historical Monument. A colonnade connects the museum to the monumental central fountain of the chateau. The building has rich sculptural decoration, including the group of the Durance by Jules Cavelier and four wild animals by Antoine-Louis Barye at the entrance. On the stairs of the museum there are two paintings by Pierre Puvis de Chavannes: Marseille, gateway to the East and Marseilles, a Greek colony.

== Collections ==
=== Paintings ===
The painting collection includes works of the French, Italian, Spanish and Northern (Flanders and Holland) schools.

- Of the French school, the best represented, there are paintings by Eustache Le Sueur, Simon Vouet, Sébastien Bourdon, Charles Le Brun, Étienne Peson, some rare canvasses of the Marseille sculptor Pierre Paul Puget, others by Philippe de Champaigne, Nicolas Mignard, Pierre Mignard, Louis Cretey, Charles de La Fosse, Alexandre-François Desportes, Hyacinthe Rigaud, Jean-Baptiste Oudry, Charles-Joseph Natoire, Jean-Marc Nattier, Charles-André van Loo, Hubert Robert, Claude Joseph Vernet, Jean-Baptiste Greuze, Joseph-Marie Vien, Louise Élisabeth Vigée Le Brun, Jacques-Louis David and from the 19th century by Théodore Chassériau, Charles-François Daubigny, Gustave Courbet, Jean-Baptiste-Camille Corot, Jean-François Millet, Pierre Puvis de Chavannes, Honoré Daumier, etc.
- A significant number of Italian paintings are also present, including works by Pietro Perugino, Giulio Romano, Jacopo Bassano, Giovanni Cariani, Giorgio Vasari, Lavinia Fontana and Cristofano Allori from the 16th century, and with Annibale Carracci, Carlo Dolci, Guido Reni, Guercino, Gioacchino Assereto, Mattia Preti, Giovanni Benedetto Castiglione, Carlo Maratta, Giovanni Lanfranco, Luca Giordano, Giovanni Domenico Tiepolo (Le Christ et la femme adultère), and also Canaletto and Giovanni Paolo Panini (La Galerie de tableaux du cardinal Valenti Gonzaga) from the 17th and 18th centuries.
- Spanish paintings from the golden age are notably represented by Jusepe de Ribera and Antonio de Pereda.
- The Northern schools from the same period are represented by works by Jan Brueghel the Younger, Peter Paul Rubens (Chasse au sanglier), Louis Finson, Jacob Jordaens, Frans Snyders and David Teniers the Younger.

== Gallery ==
Selected paintings in the museum

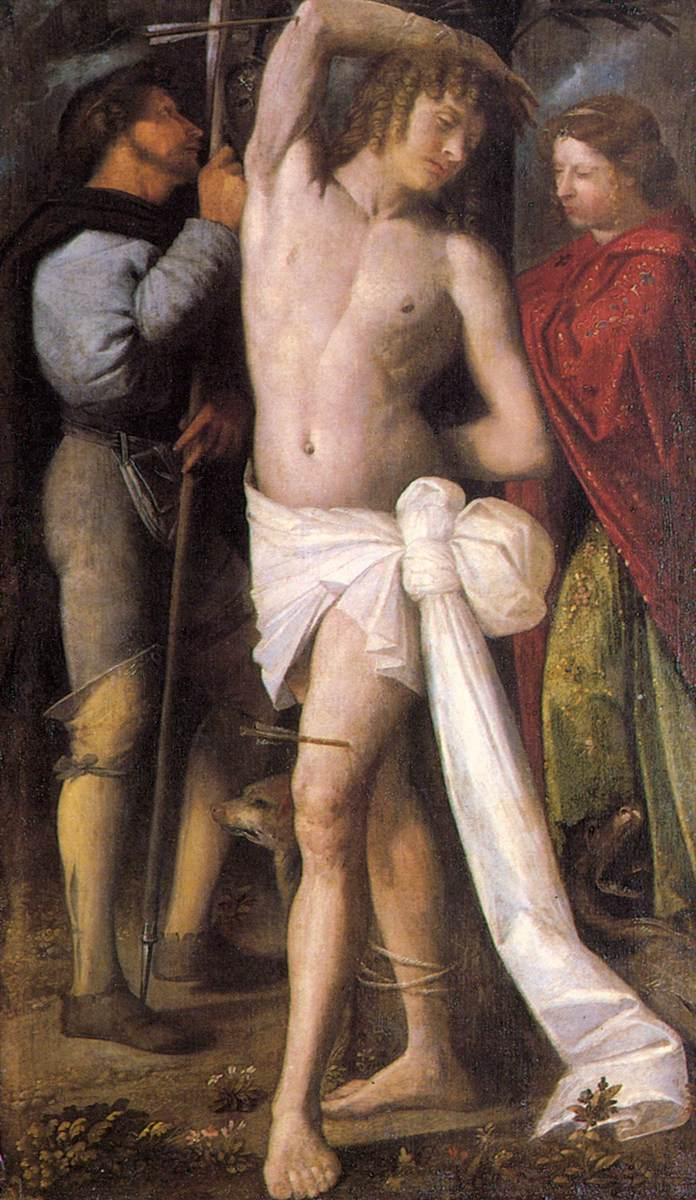
Giovanni Cariani, St Sebastian between St Roch and St Margaret

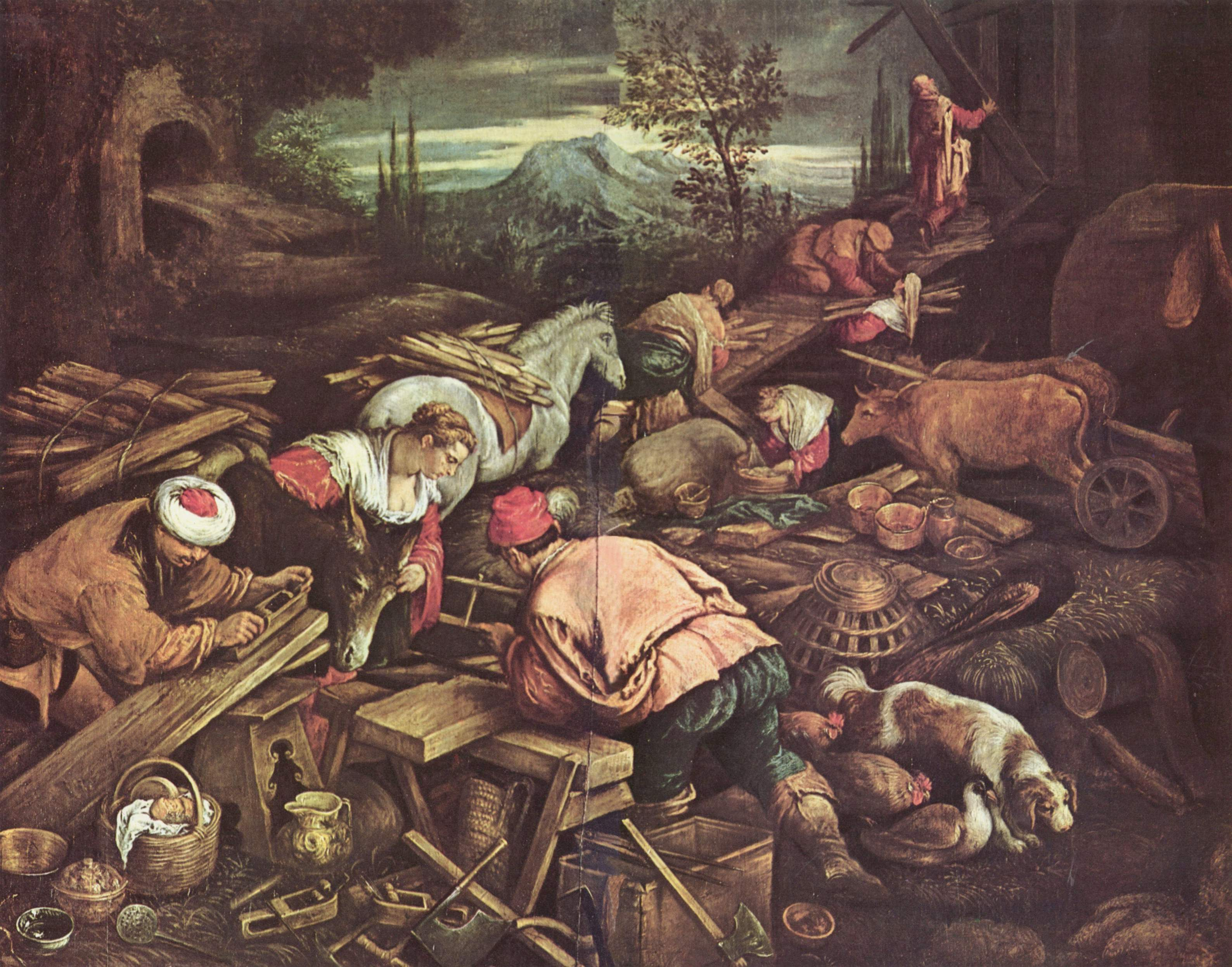
Jacopo Bassano, Construction of Noah's Ark

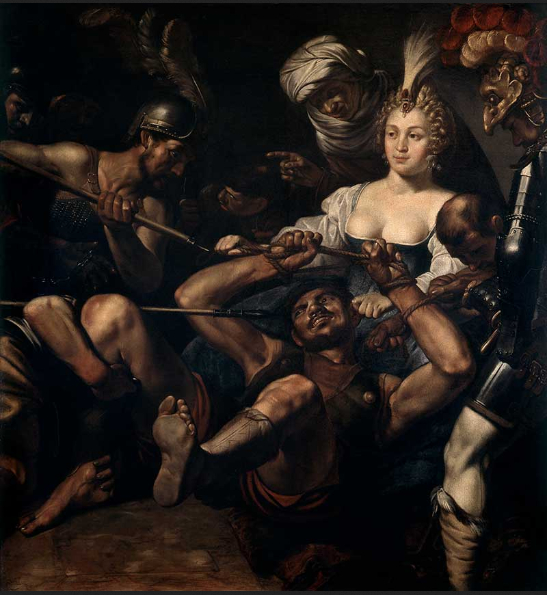
Louis Finson, Samson and Delilah

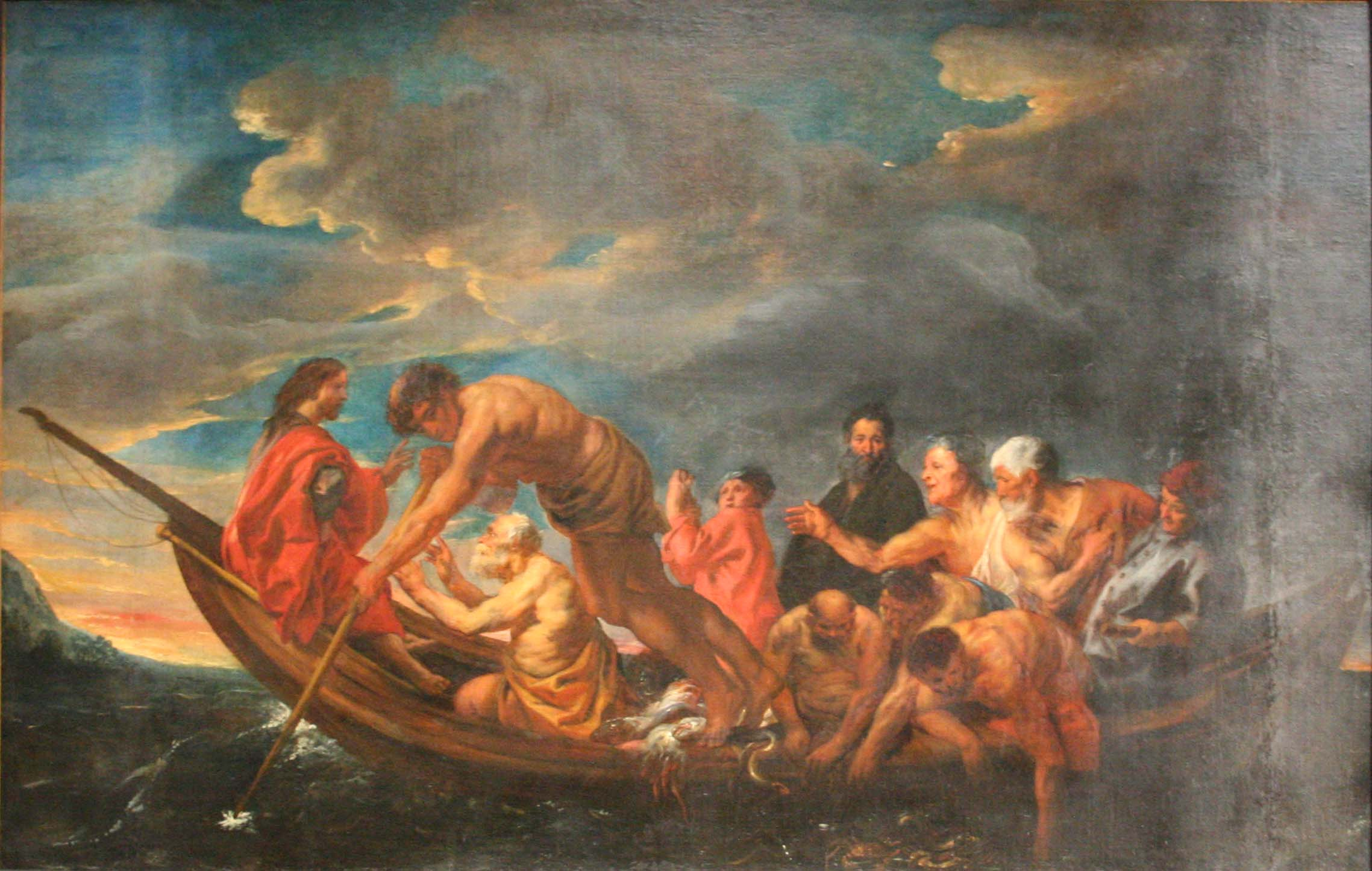
Jacob Jordaens, The miraculous draught of fish

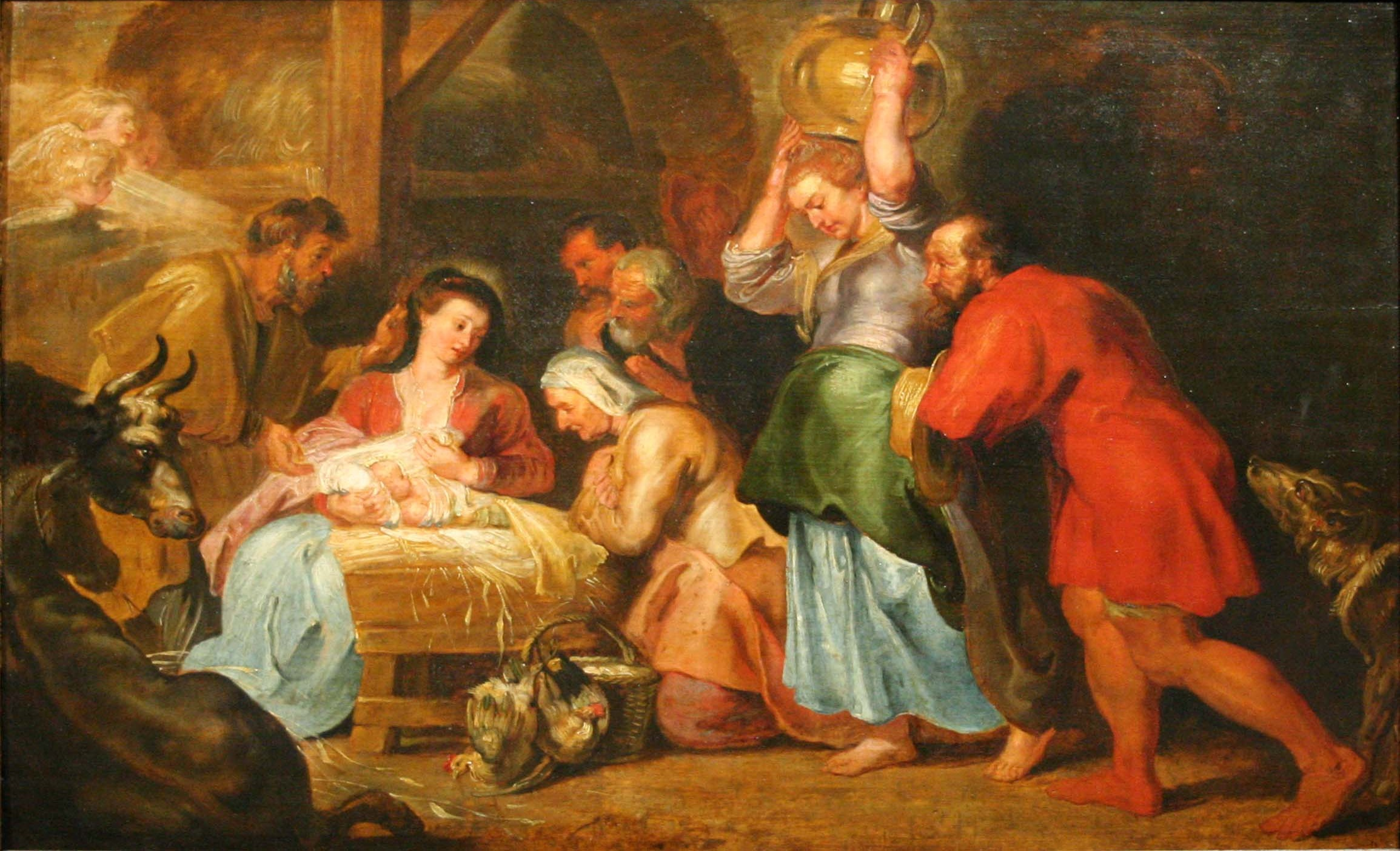
Peter Paul Rubens, Adoration of the shepherds

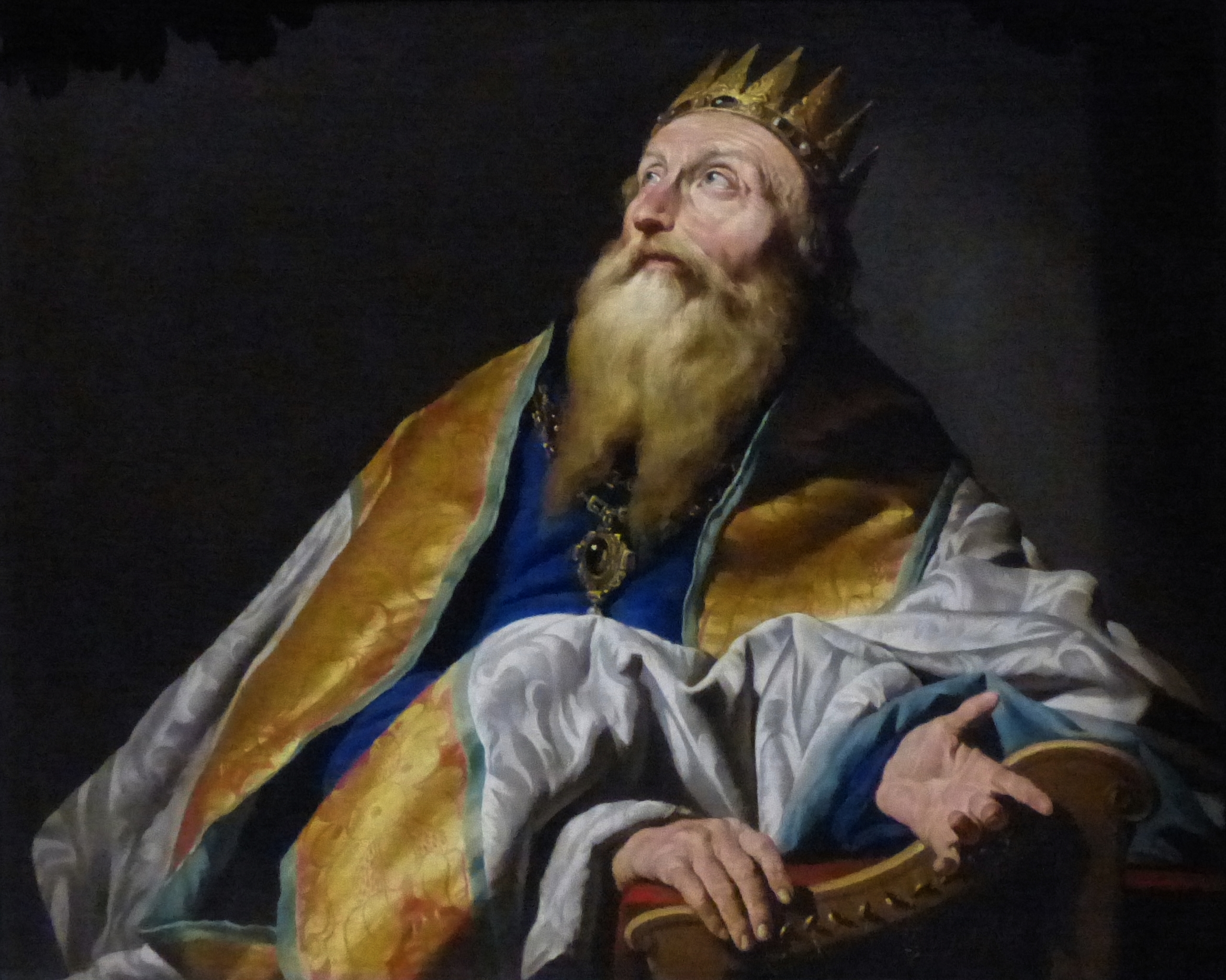
Matthias Stom, King David

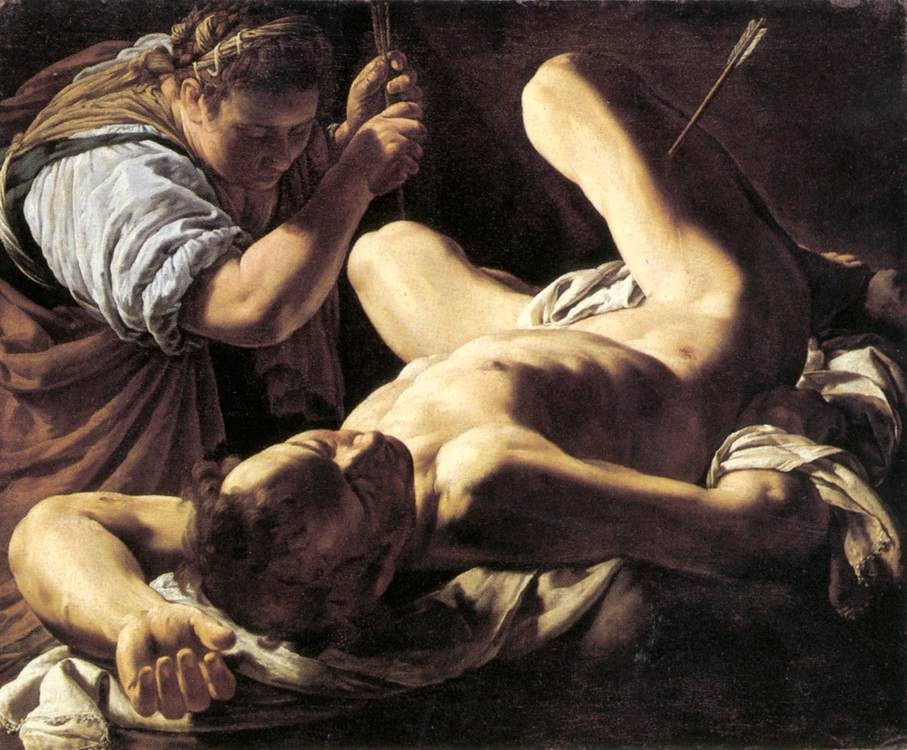
Marco Antonio Bassetti, St Sebastian Tended by St Irene

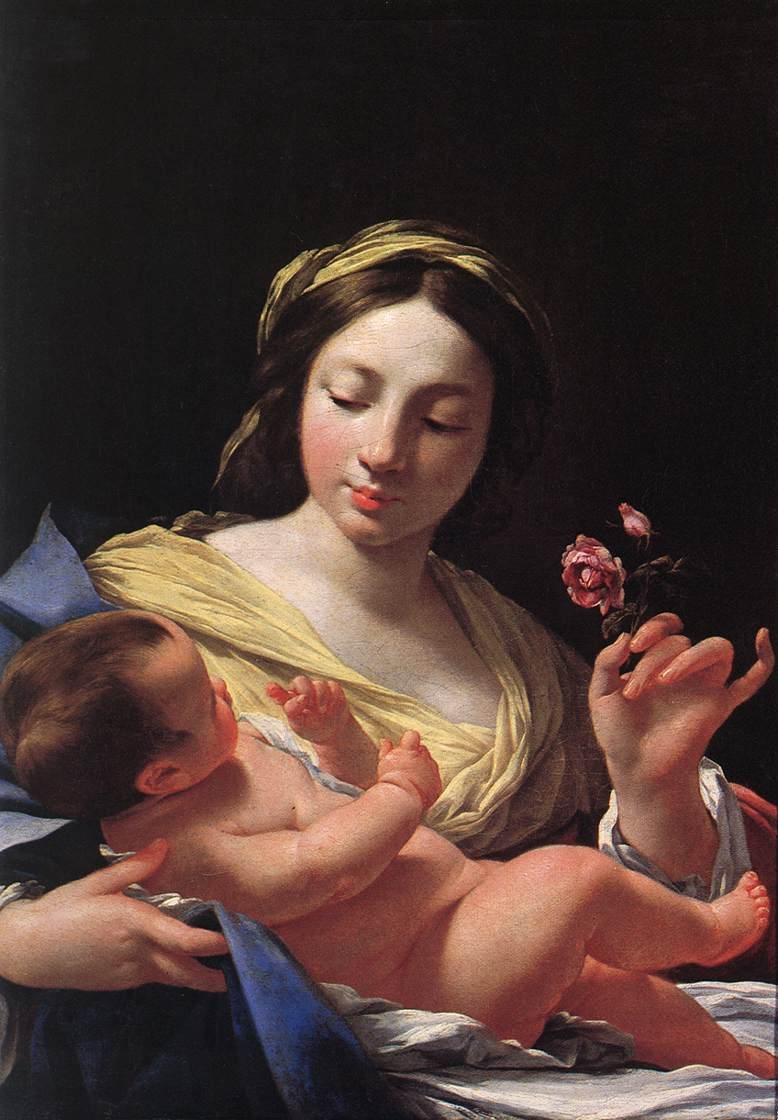
Simon Vouet, Madonna and Child with a rose

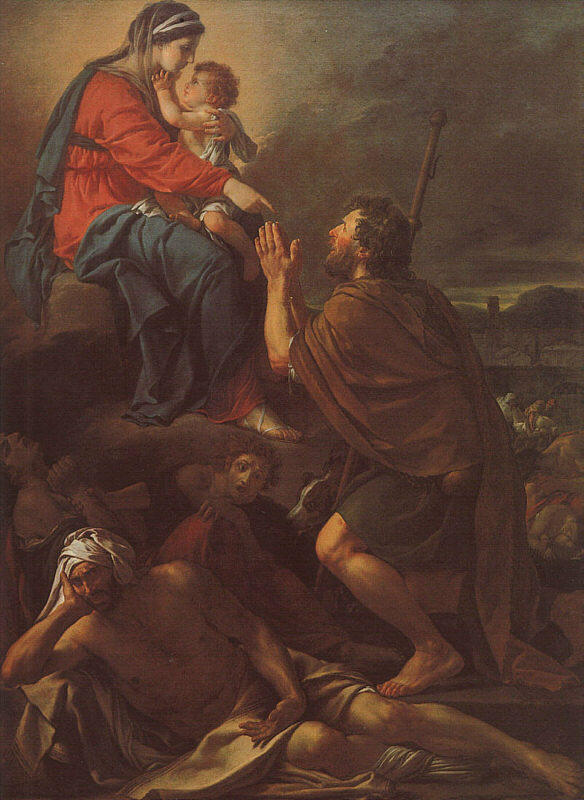
Jacques-Louis David, Saint Roch interceding with the Virgin

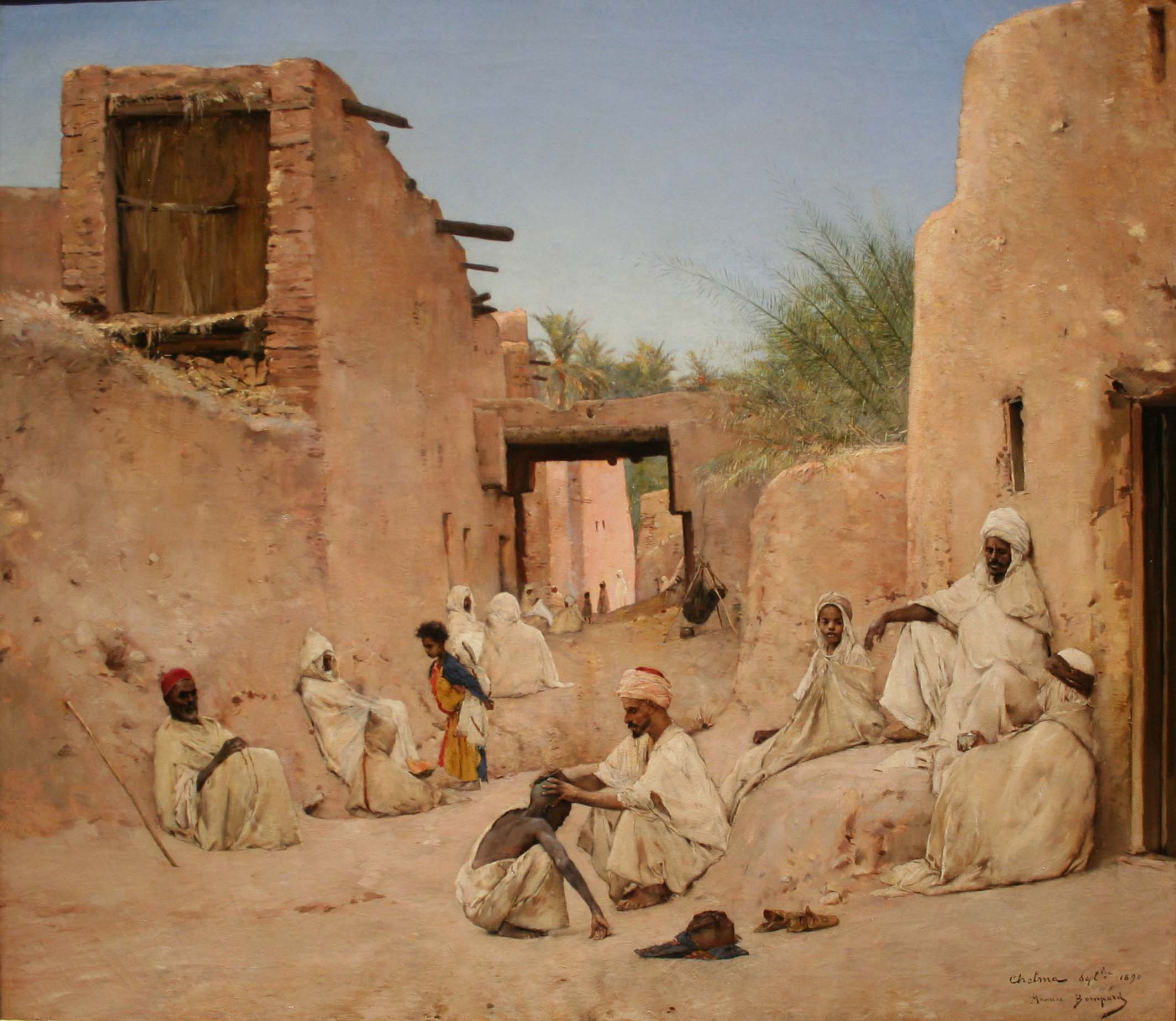
Maurice Bompard, A street of the oasis Chetma

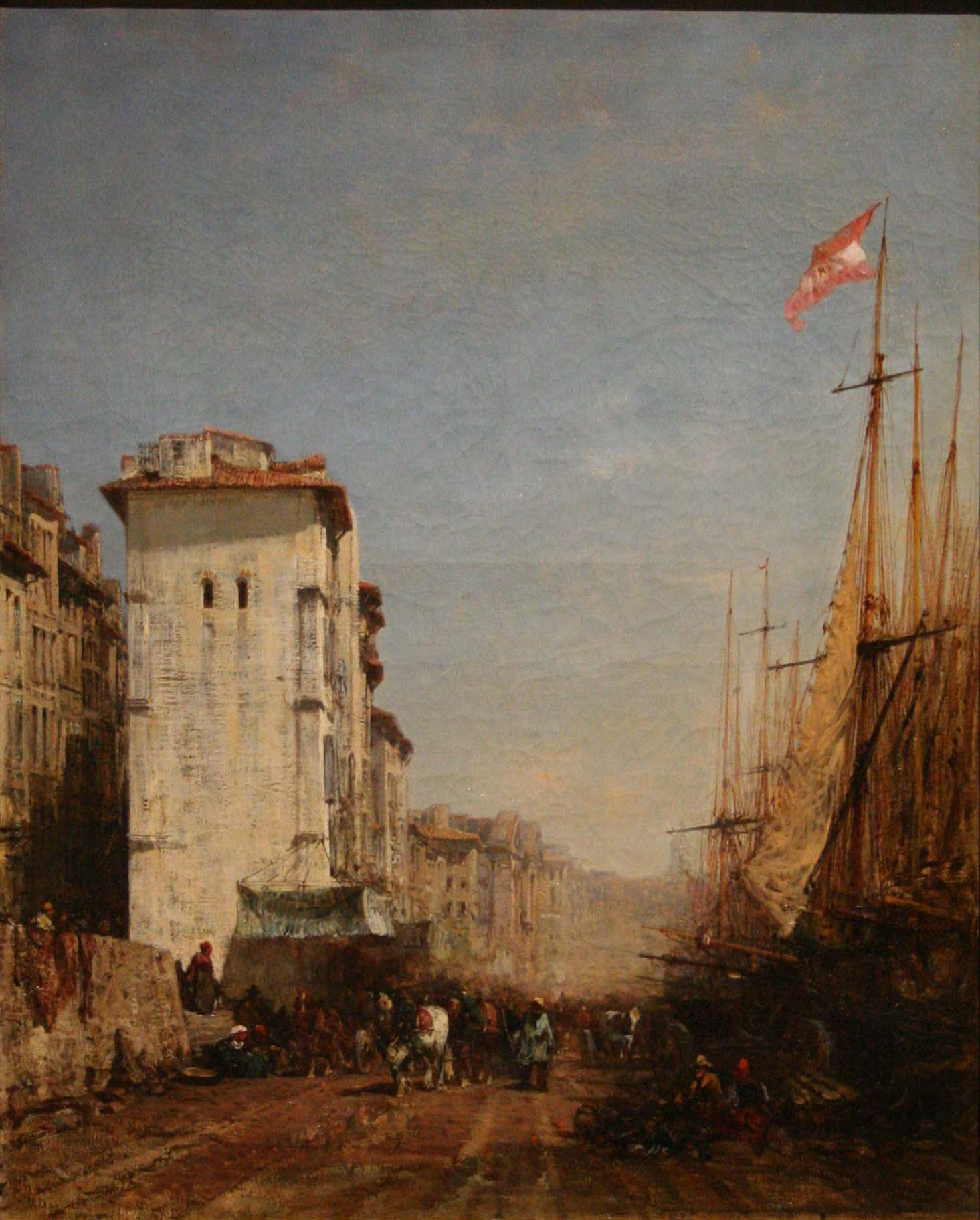
Félix Ziem
Quay of the port of Marseille

=== Drawings ===
From the French school, there is a notable collection of drawings by Pierre Paul Puget. The Italian school is represented with drawings by Pontormo, Guercino, Giovanni Lanfranco, Salvator Rosa and with twenty one Tuscan drawings from the 16th and early 17th centuries by Fra Angelico, Bartolommeo Bandinelli, Francesco Salviati, Baldassare Peruzzi, Il Sodoma and Giorgio Vasari.

Selected drawings in the museum

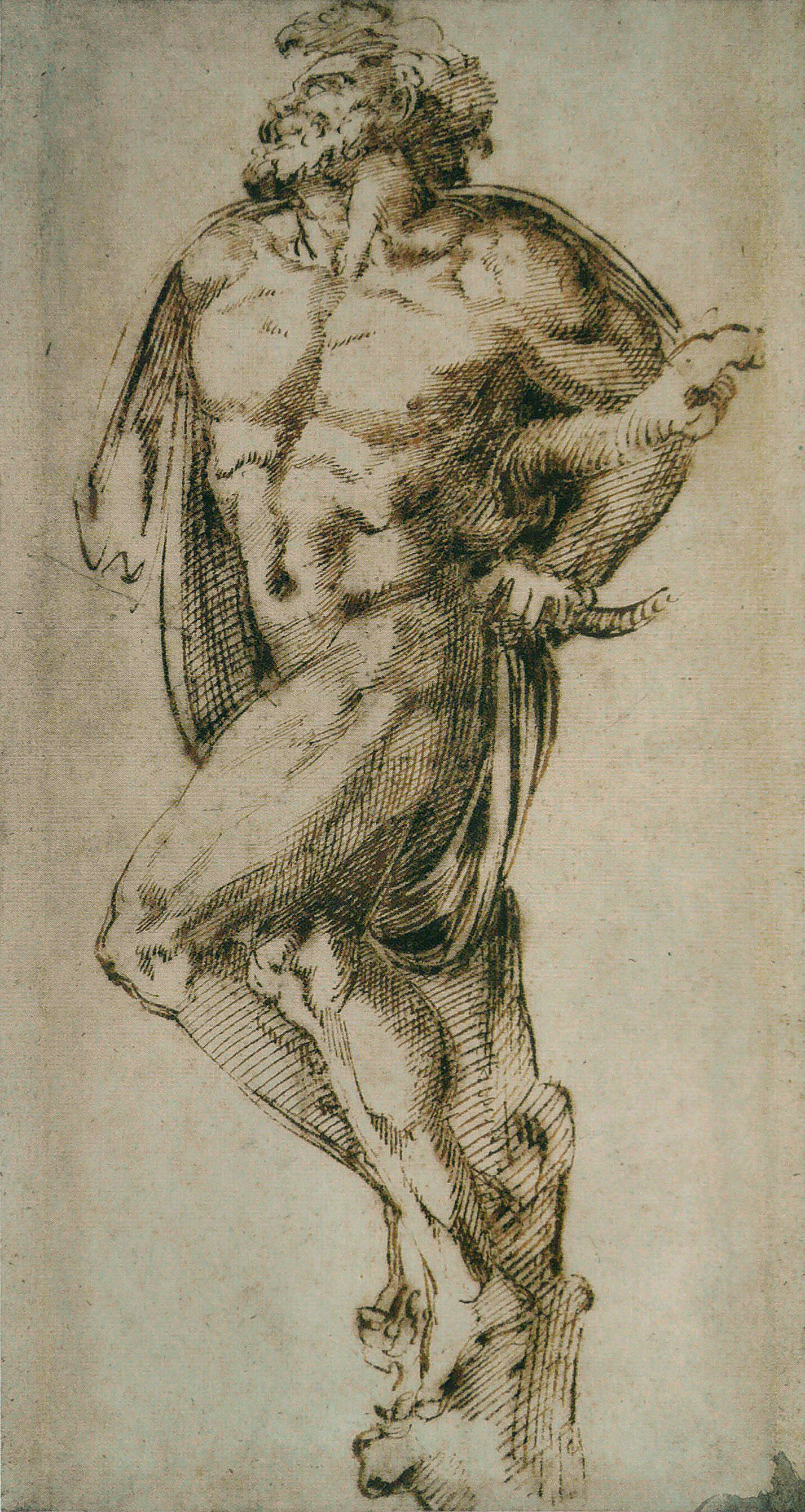
Bartolommeo Bandinelli, Study of a crucified thief, 16th century

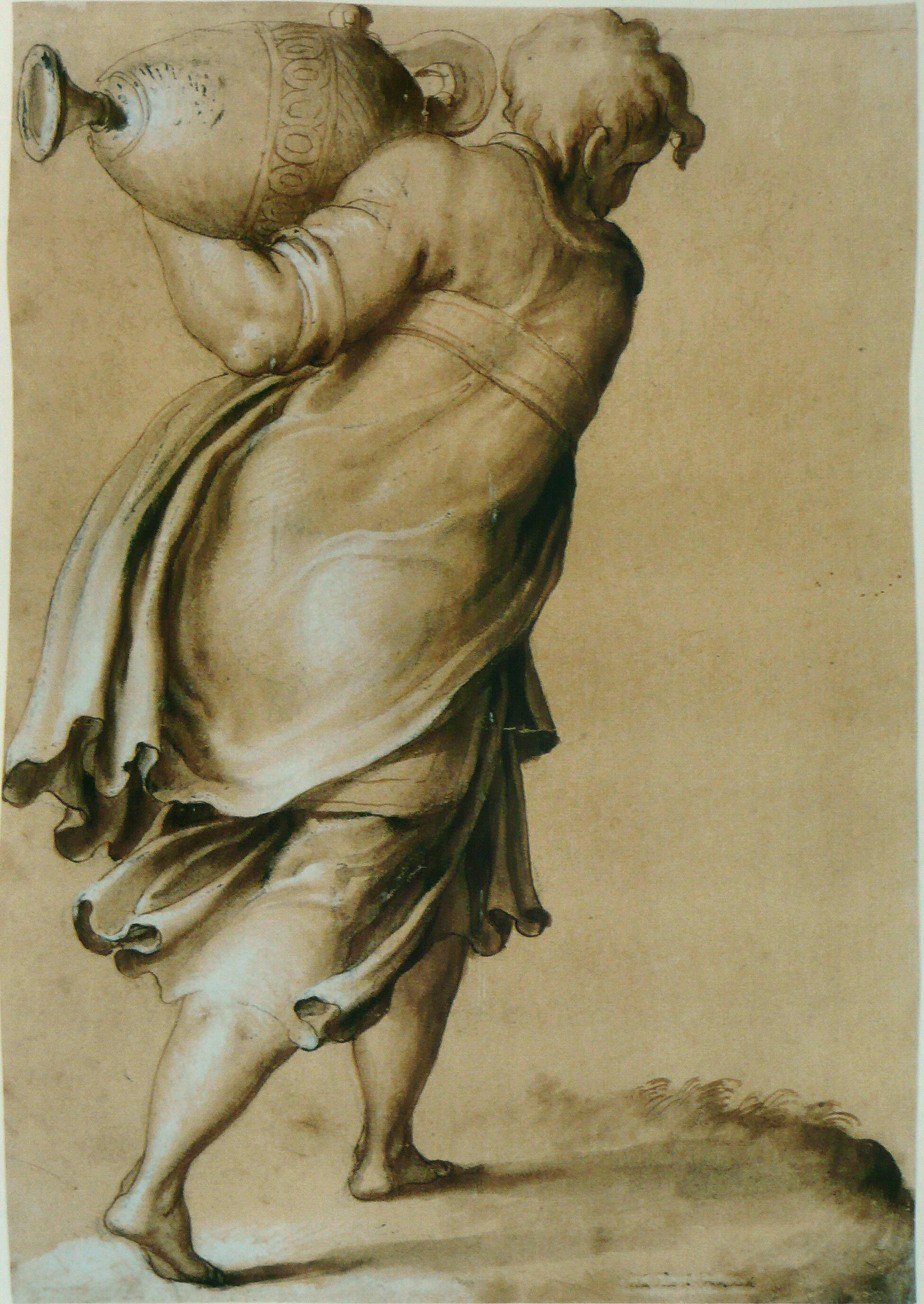
Francesco Salviati, Man seen from the back carrying an urn, 16th century

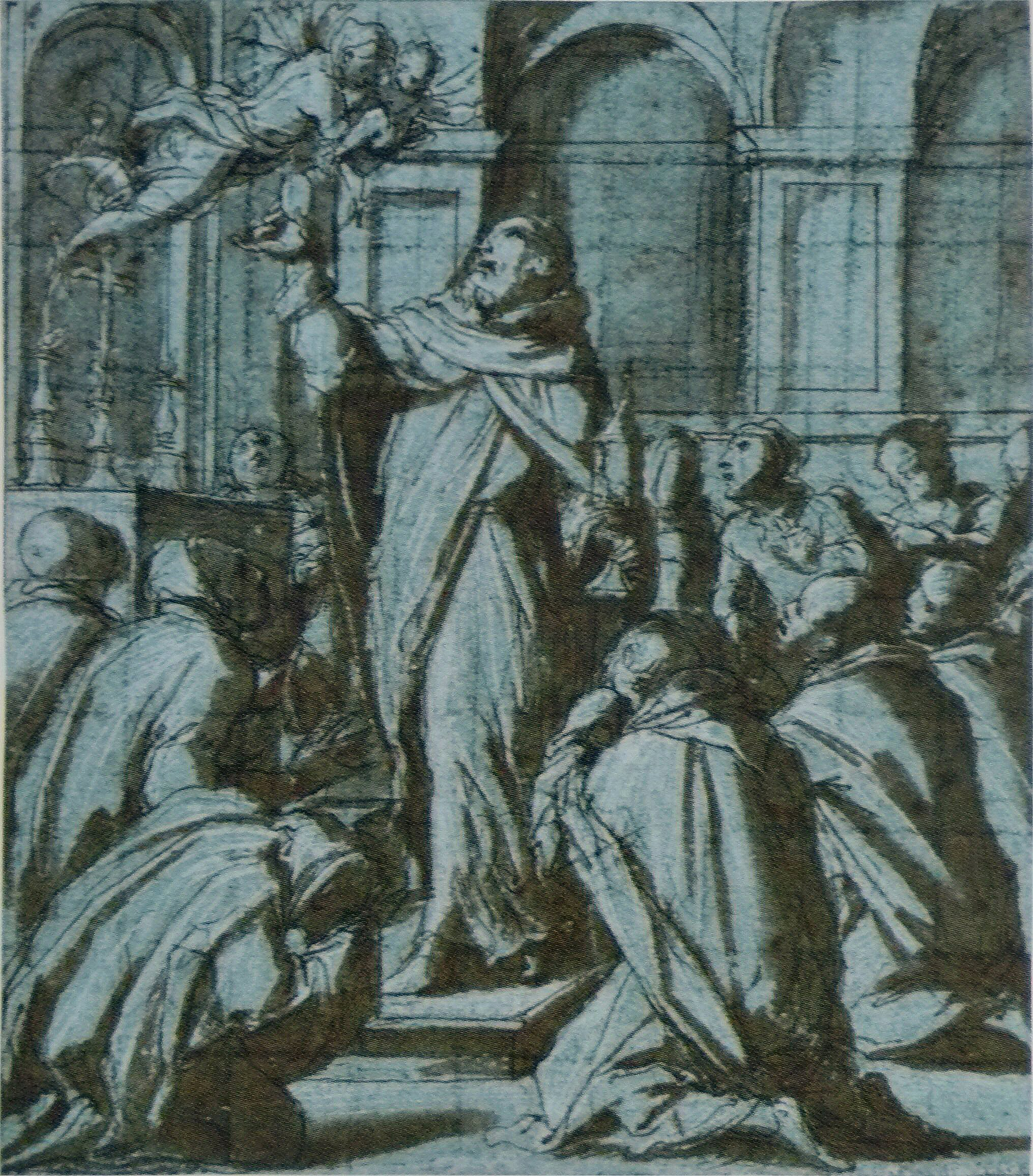
Giorgio Vasari, St Peter of Verona exorcising a demon personified by a Madonna and Child, 1570s.

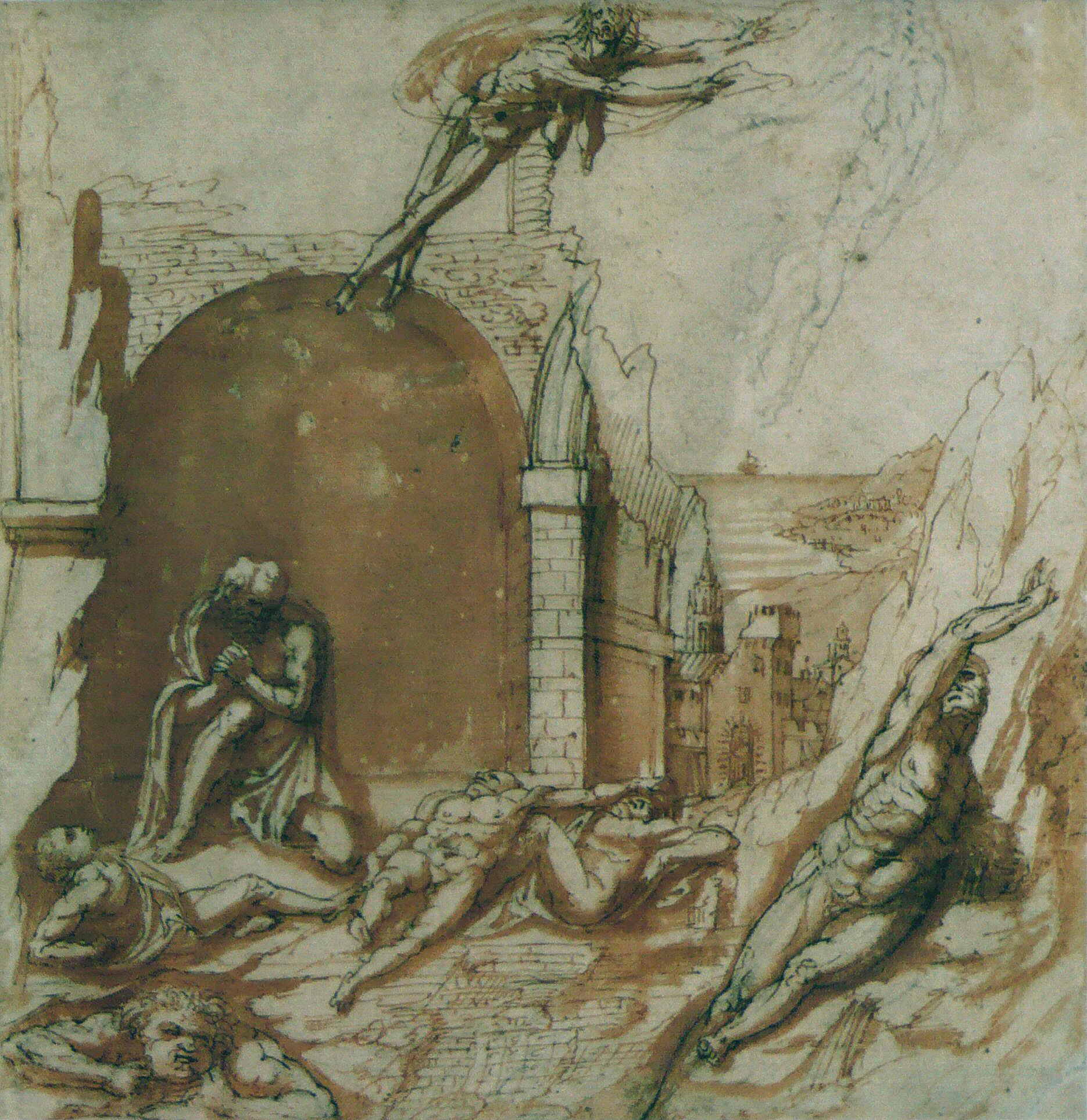
Pierino da Vinci, The count Ugolino and his children in prison, visited by Hunger, 16th century

=== Sculptures ===
The museum holds a collection of sculpture by Pierre Paul Puget (1620–1694), as well as La Méditation by Auguste Rodin, offered to the museum by the artist himself.
