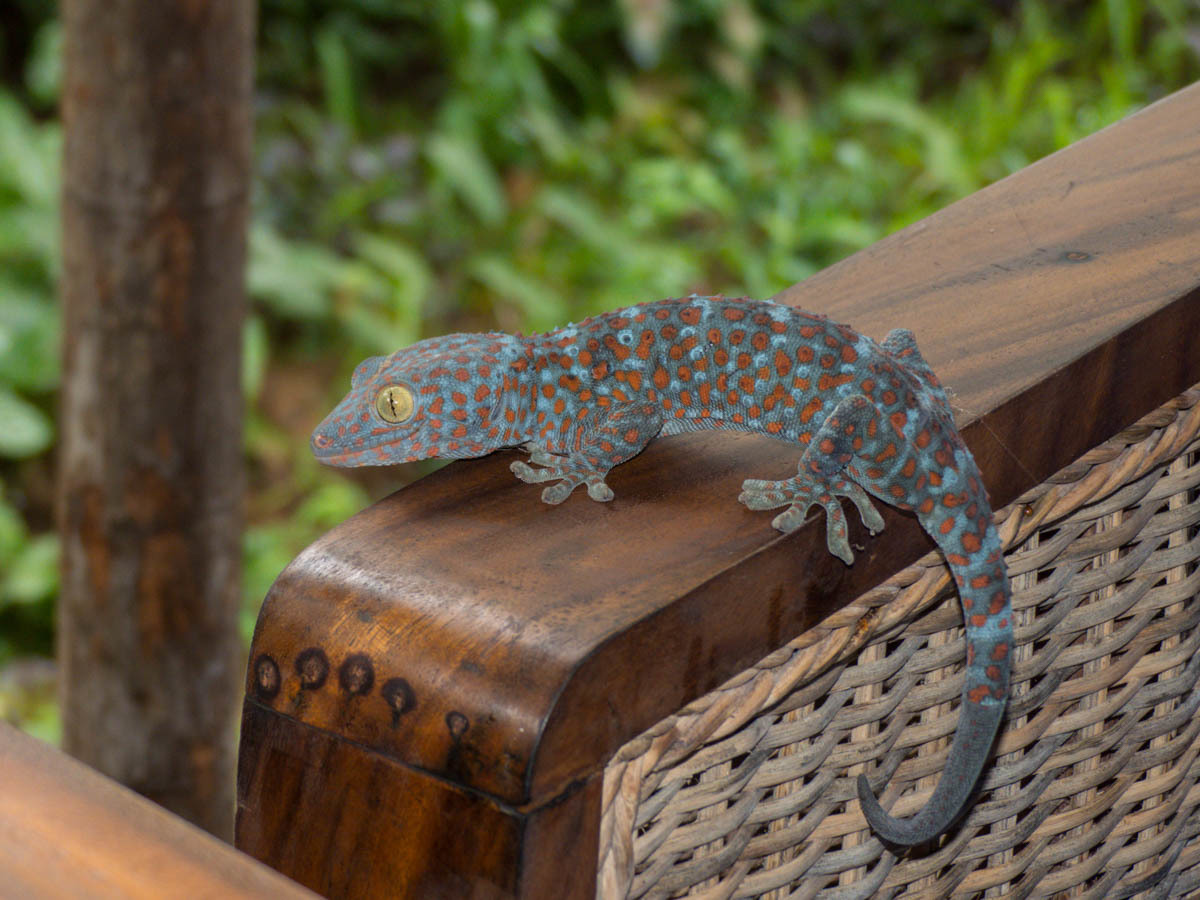
- In Cambodia

Conservation status
- Least Concern (IUCN 3.1)
- CITES Appendix II

Scientific classification
- Kingdom: Animalia
- Phylum: Chordata
- Class: Reptilia
- Order: Squamata
- Suborder: Gekkota
- Family: Gekkonidae
- Genus: Gekko
- Species: G. gecko

Binomial name
- Gekko gecko (Linnaeus, 1758)

Synonyms
- Lacerta gecko Linnaeus, 1758

Audio
- Calls

= Tokay gecko =

Species of reptile

The tokay gecko (Gekko gecko) is a nocturnal arboreal gecko in the genus Gekko, the true geckos. It is native to Tropical Asia and some Pacific Islands. Tokay geckos reach lengths of 25 to 30 cm (9.8 to 11.8 in), making it the third-largest species of gecko. They are recognizable from their robust body, light blue-gray skin with red or orange spots, and adhesive foot pads that allow them to walk along vertical surfaces, though their sonorous mating calls are often the most obvious sign of their presence.

== Etymology ==
The word "tokay" (/ˈtoʊkeɪ/) is an onomatopoeia of the sound made by males of this species. It derives from Malay: tokek [tokeʔ] in Batavian Malay, tĕkek [təkeʔ] and gokek [ɡokeʔ] in Peninsular Malay, and gekok [ɡekoʔ] from Java. These names ultimately gave rise to the species' common name in English, the near-tautonymous scientific name, the family name Gekkonidae, and the word "gecko".

== Subspecies ==
Two subspecies are currently recognized:

- G. g. gecko (Linnaeus, 1758) occurs in tropical Asia from northeastern India to eastern Indonesia.
- G. g. azhari (Mertens, 1955) is found only in Bangladesh.

== Distribution and habitat ==
This species is found in northeast India, Bhutan, Nepal, and Bangladesh; throughout Southeast Asia, including Cambodia, Thailand, the Philippines, Malaysia, Vietnam and Indonesia; and toward western New Guinea. Its native habitat is rainforests, where it lives on trees and cliffs, and it frequently adapts to rural human habitations, roaming walls and ceilings at night in search of insect prey. This is an introduced species in some areas outside its native range. It is established in Florida in the United States, Martinique, the islands of Belize, and possibly Hawaii. Increasing urbanization is reducing its range.

Whether the species is native but very uncommon in Taiwan or whether the rare reports of individuals since the 1920s are based on repeated anthropogenic translocations that may or may not have resulted in established populations by now is unclear.

== Description ==
The tokay gecko is a large nocturnal gecko, reaching a total length (including tail) of 25–30 cm (10–12 inches) on average, but some grow as large as 40 cm (16 inches) long. It is believed to be the third-largest species of gecko, after the giant leaf-tail gecko (Uroplatus giganteus) and New Caledonian giant gecko (Rhacodactylus leachianus). It is cylindrical, but somewhat flattened in body shape. The eyes have vertical pupils.

The skin is soft to the touch and is generally blue-gray with red or orange spots and speckles, but the animal can change the color of its skin to blend into the environment. The species is sexually dimorphic, with the males being more brightly colored and slightly larger than females. They have two visual pigments: a "green" with λmax at 521 nm and a "blue" at 467 nm.

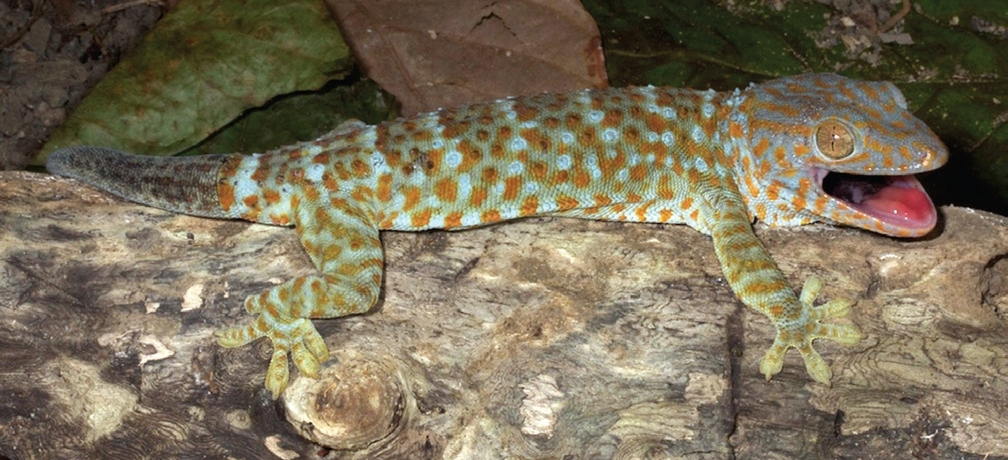
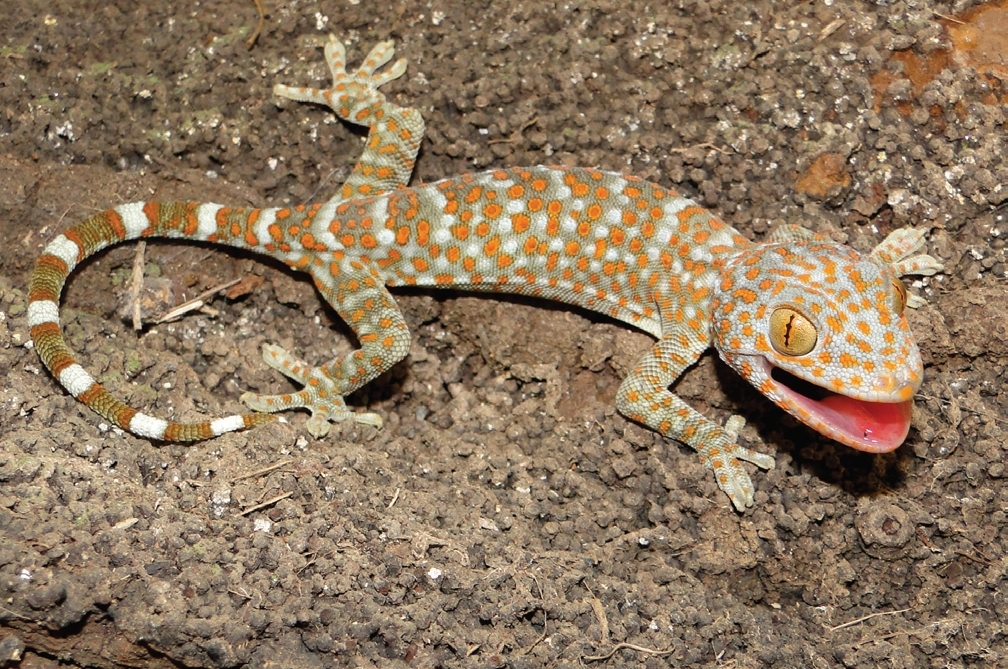
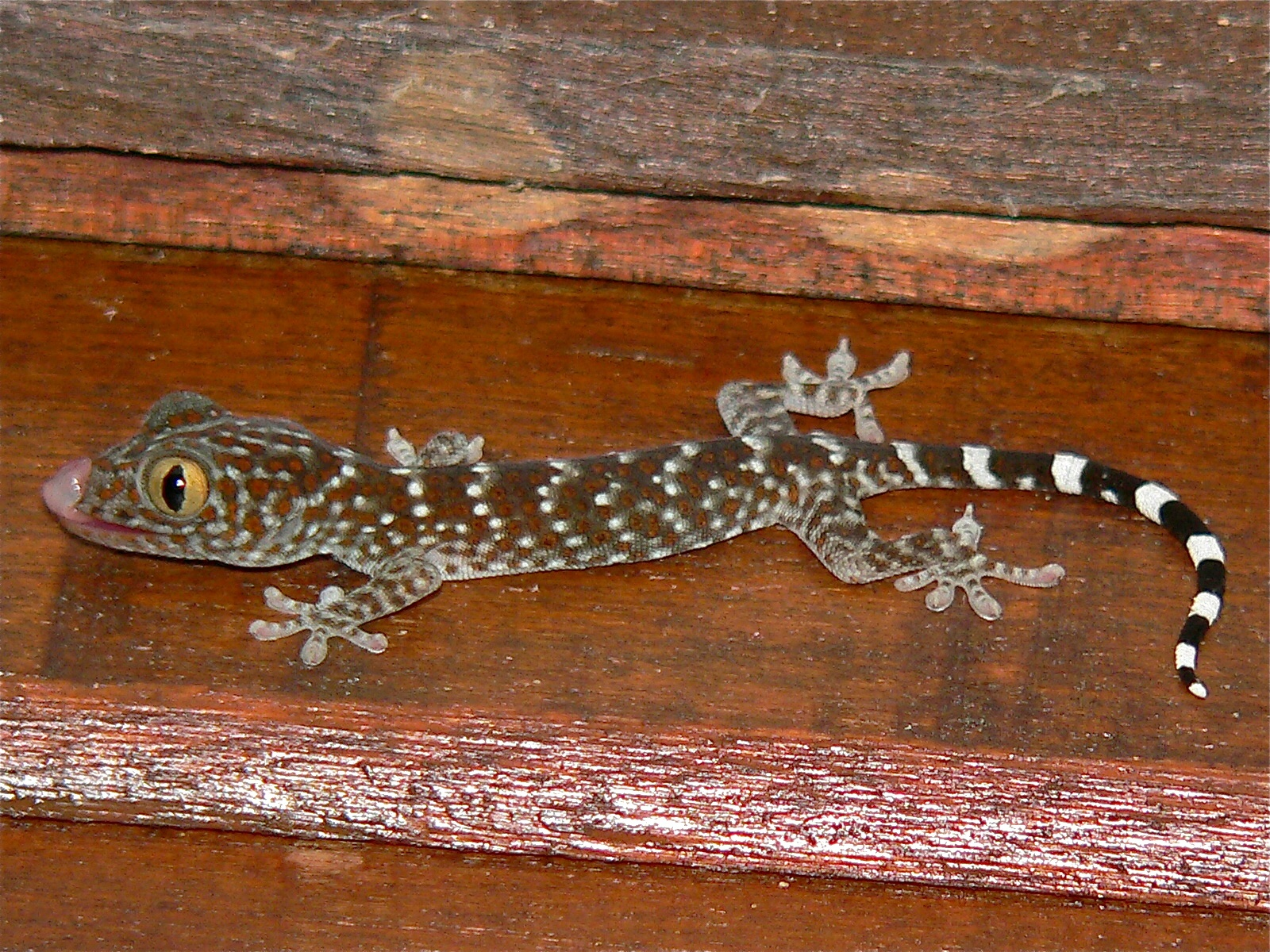
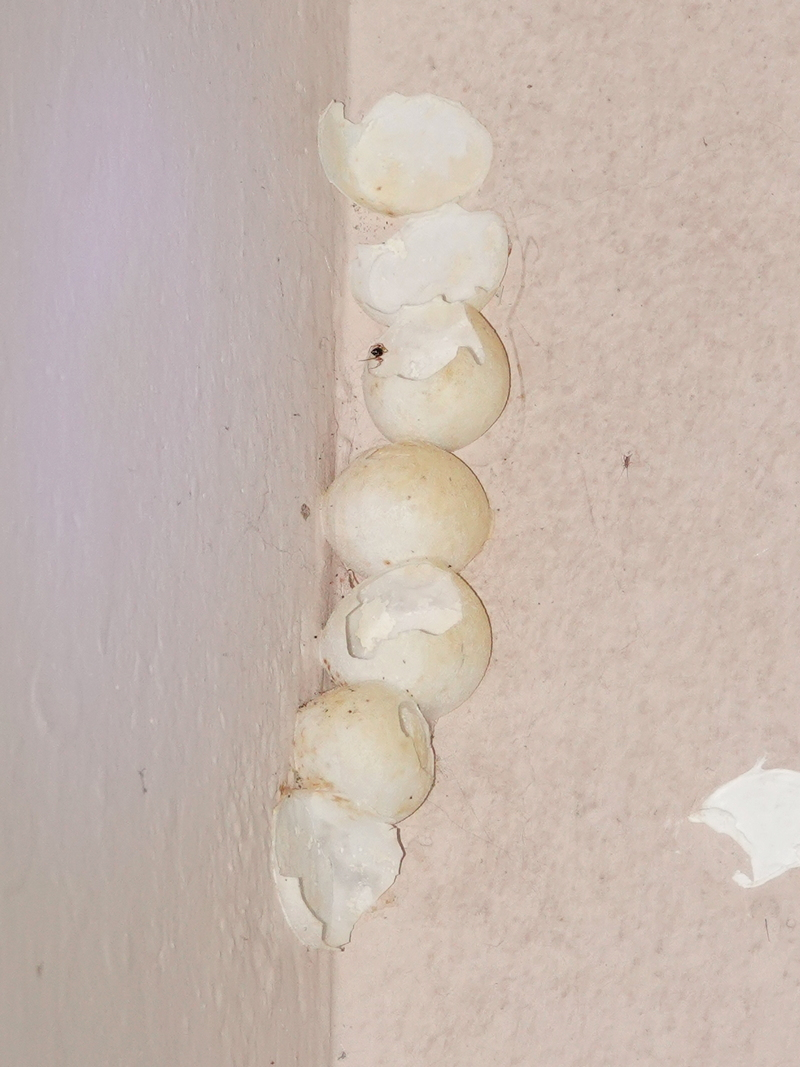
From left to right: adult male (left) showing a brownish regenerated tail, older juvenile, young juvenile, hatched eggs

It is a strong climber with foot pads that can support the entire weight of its body on a vertical surface for a long period of time. Compared to other gecko species, the tokay gecko has a robust build, with a semiprehensile tail, a large head, and muscular jaws.

== Behaviour ==
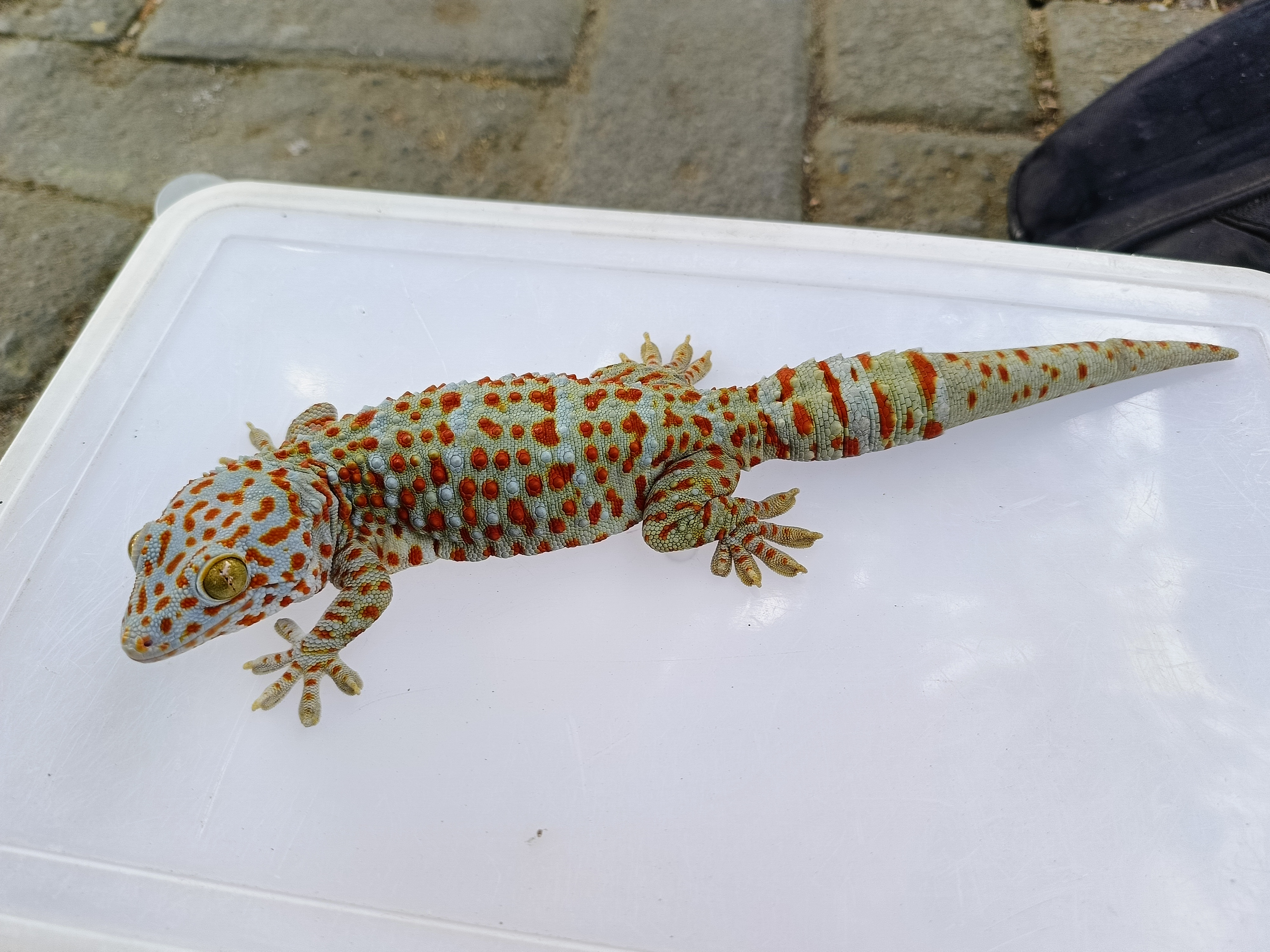
Adult in captivity

Tokay geckos are generally aggressive and territorial, and can inflict a strong bite. Though common in the pet trade, the strong bite of the tokay gecko makes it ill-suited for inexperienced keepers. In addition, the strength of the bite depends on the gecko's size; larger (usually male) tokay geckos are capable of piercing skin, which often results in immediate bleeding.

Females lay clutches of one or two hard-shelled eggs and guard them until they hatch.

When breeding, pairs form temporary family groups and care for their young. They can distinguish their mates and offspring from other geckos by their smell.

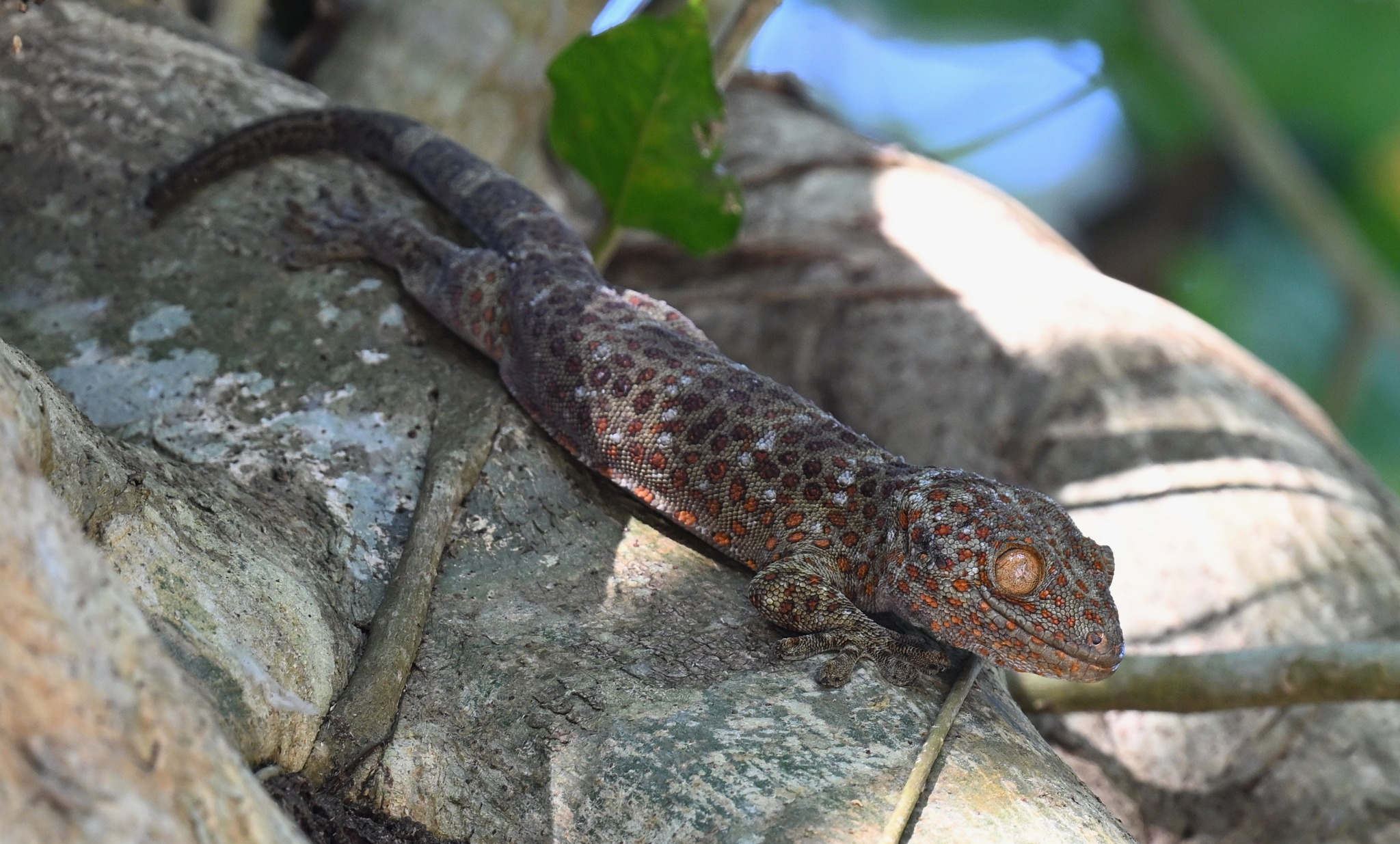
Appearance during the day, in Assam, India

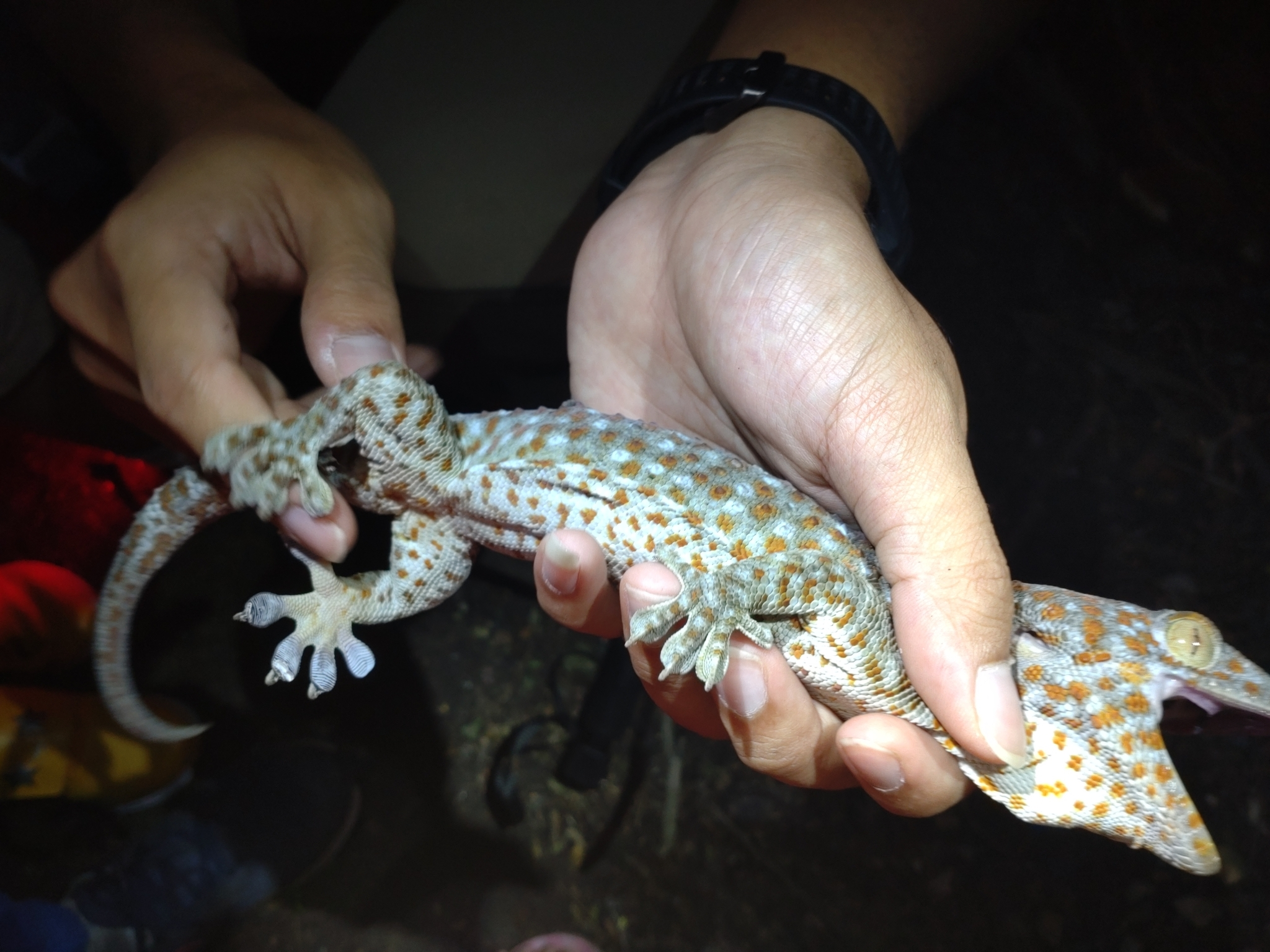
Showing the size of a large defensive tokay gecko

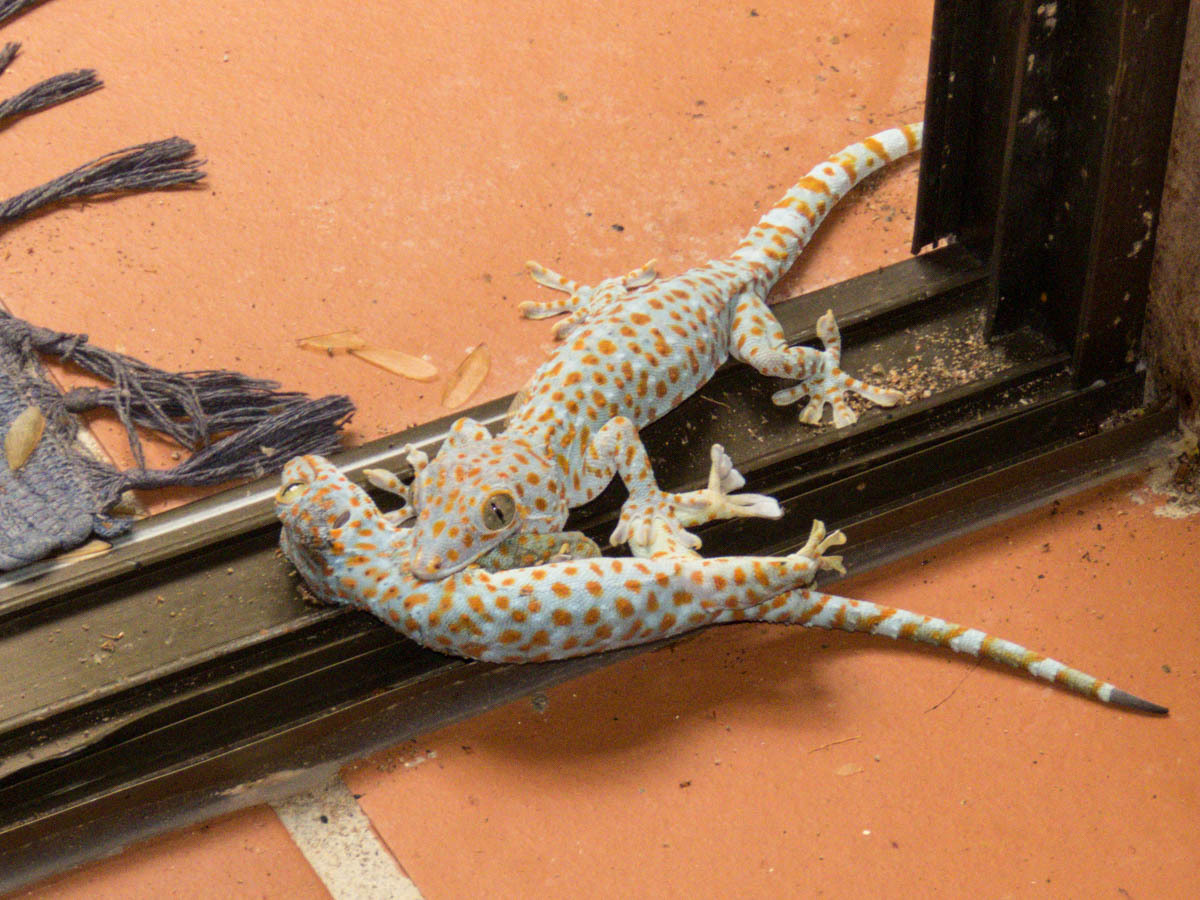
Adults fighting

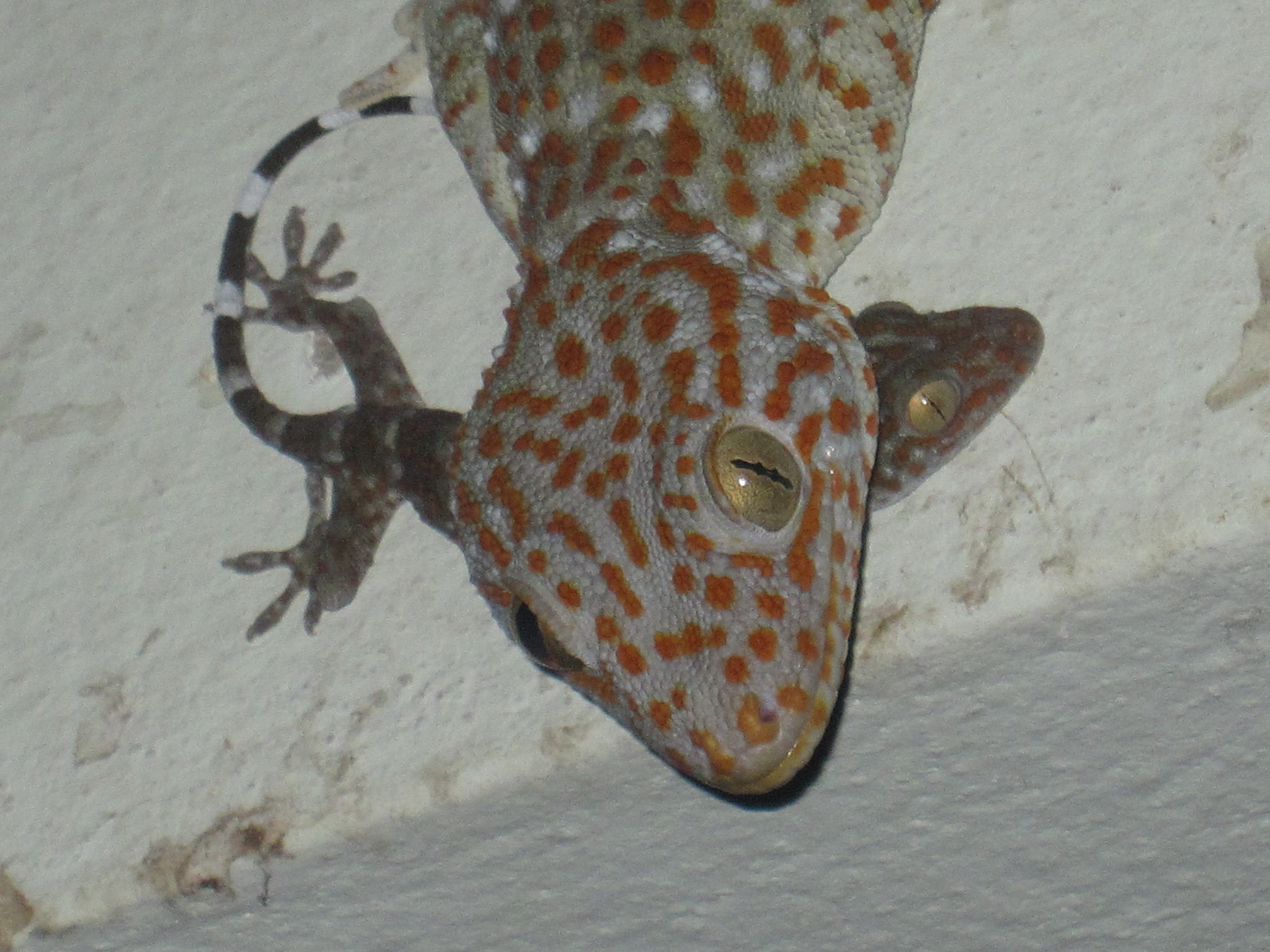
Juvenile underneath an adult

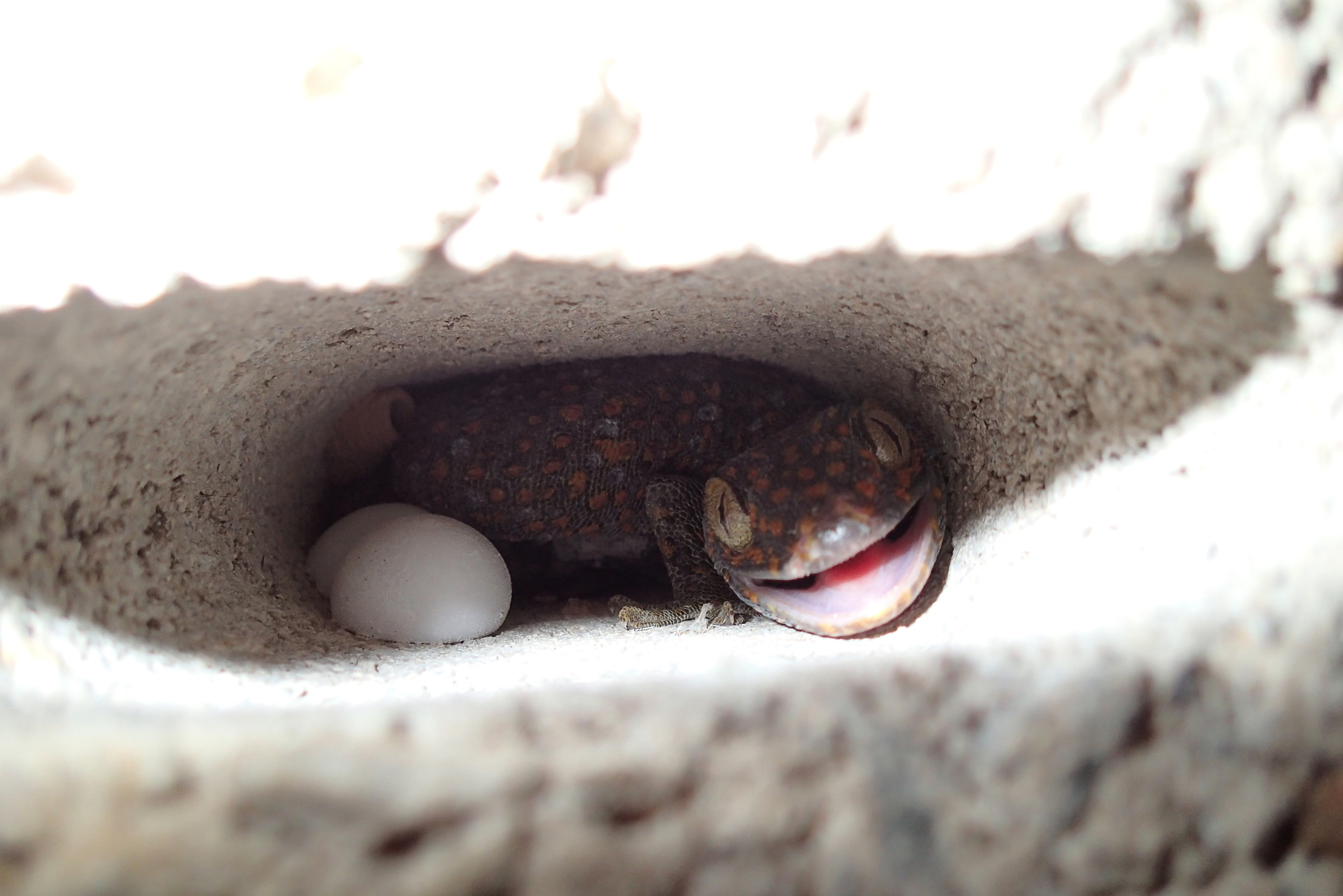
Female guarding eggs

=== Diet ===
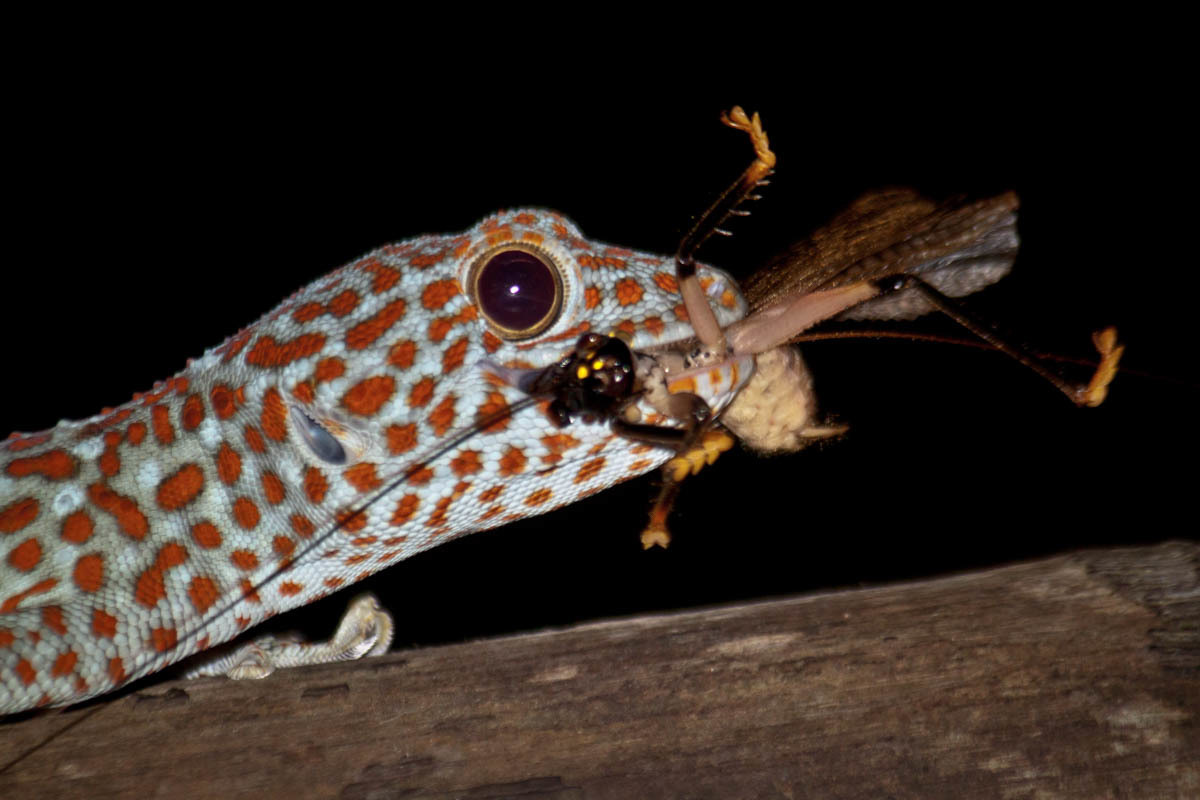
Feeding on a cricket, showing fully dilated pupils

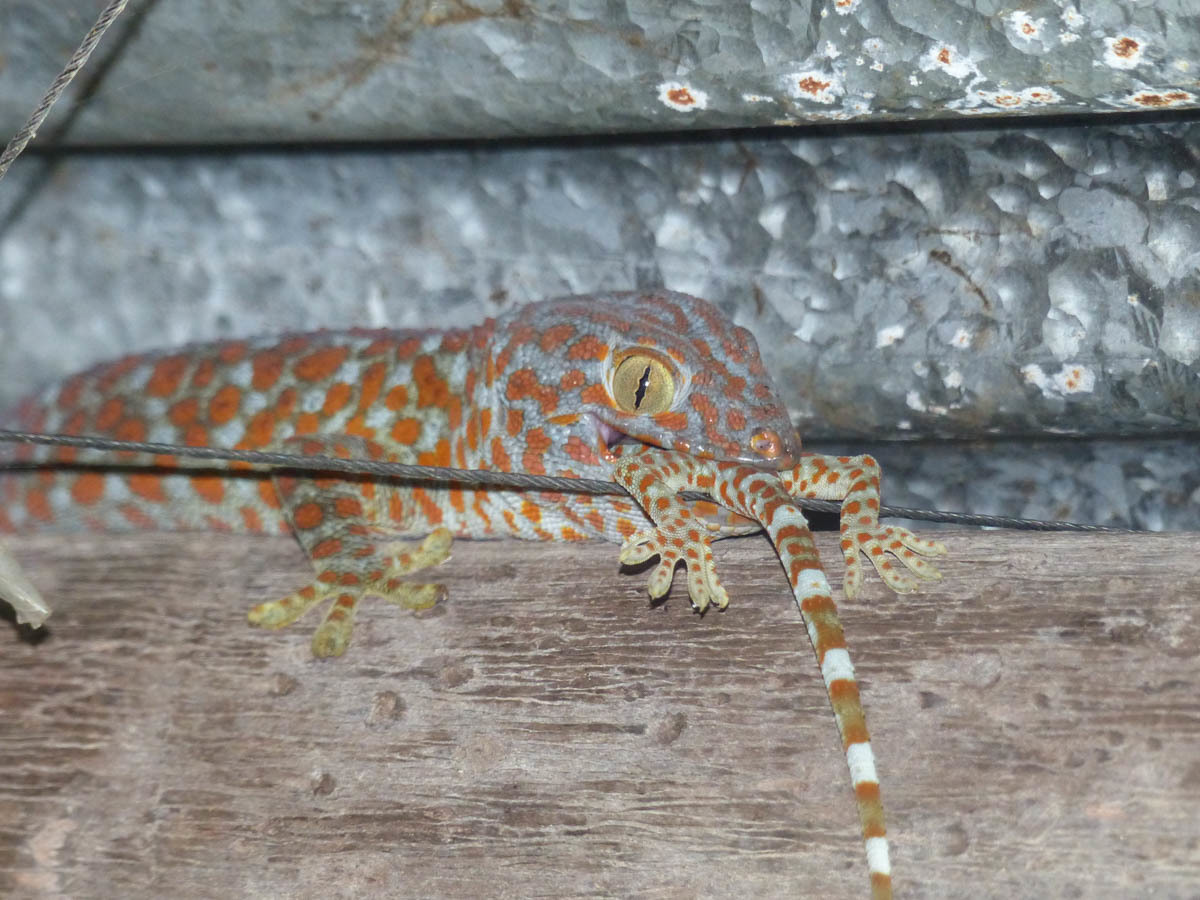
Cannibalizing a younger tokay gecko

The tokay gecko feeds on insects and small vertebrates. In captivity, they usually feed on springtails, mealworms, cockroaches, crickets, grasshoppers, locusts, and pink mice. In a study conducted in Thailand, researchers noticed little variation in the diets of males, females, and juveniles, which was likely due to low insect availability in this area. In Southern Florida, roaches, caterpillars, spiders, and beetles were the most numerous taxa present and common to the greatest number of stomachs.

=== Call ===
The male's mating call, a loud croak, is variously described as sounding like token, gekk-gekk, tuck-too, túc-key, tou-kay or tokay. Most of the time, the call is preceded by a quick "cackling", similar to the chirping sounds made by house geckos albeit much lower in pitch. When threatened or alarmed, tokay geckos usually "bark" while opening their mouth in a defensive posture.

Chirping

Male's mating call

The tokay gecko's call is also responsible for the name given to it by Filipino residents: "Tuko," and by U.S. soldiers during the Vietnam War, the "Fuck-you lizard".

Light and temperature can affect its vocalizations. The most frequent calling occurs in May at dusk, and the second peak of call frequency occurs in May at dawn. Vocalizations and associated behavior were strongly affected by ambient temperature in both the lab and field and could thus play a role in regulating animal energetic metabolism

== Conservation and relationship with humans ==
The tokay gecko is culturally significant in many East Asian countries. Regional folklore has attributed supernatural powers to the gecko. In Southeast Asia it is a symbol of good luck and fertility. It is believed to be descended from dragons.

Conservation efforts heavily impacted negatively by animal trafficking, whether its for the pet trade or for medicinal purposes(Baker et al., 2013, as cited in Kongbuntad et al., 2015).This species is poached for the medicinal trades in parts of Asia. The tokay gecko is an ingredient in traditional Chinese medicine, known as Ge Jie (蛤蚧). It is believed to nourish the kidneys and lungs, beliefs that are not substantiated by medical science. The animal remains highly sought after in China, Hong Kong, Taiwan, Vietnam, Malaysia, Singapore and other parts of Asia with Chinese communities, to the point where unscrupulous merchants have taken to disfiguring monitor lizards with prosthetics to pass them off as colossal tokay gecko specimens.

From 2009 to 2011, the poaching of tokay geckos intensified because of a short-lived belief that they were an effective HIV cure.

The tokay gecko is quickly becoming a threatened species in the Philippines because of indiscriminate hunting. Collecting, transporting and trading in geckos without a license can be punishable by up to 12 years in jail and a fine of up to ₱1 million under Republic Act 9147, in addition to other applicable international laws. However, the trade runs unchecked because of the sheer number of illegal traders and reports of lucrative deals. Chinese buyers and other foreign nationals are rumored to pay thousands of dollars for large specimens, because of their alleged medicinal value or as commodities in the illegal wildlife trade.

The species is protected under Appendix II of the Convention on International Trade in Endangered Species (CITES) meaning international trade (including in parts and derivatives) is subject to the CITES permitting system.

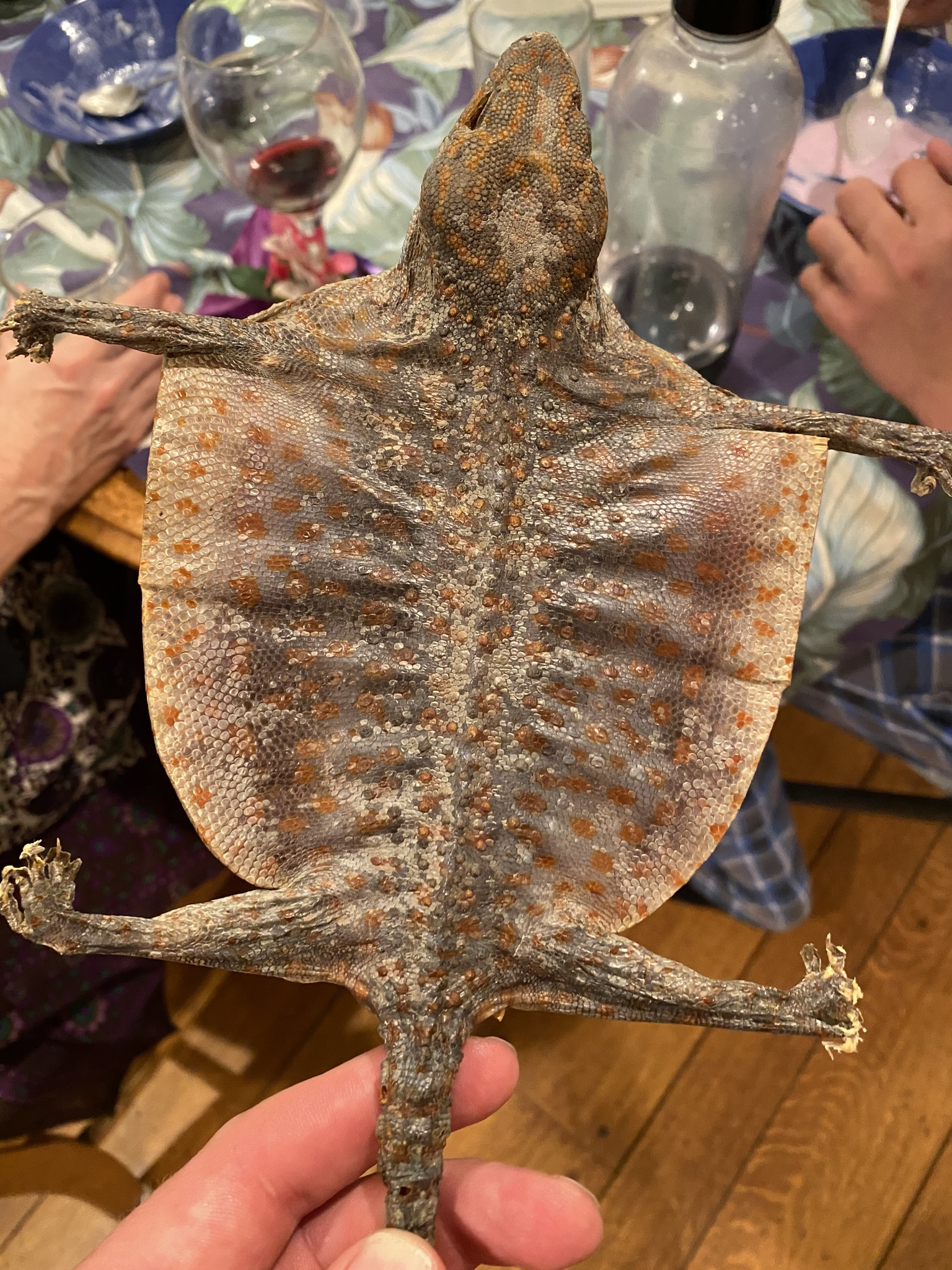
Dried tokay gecko (dorsal view)

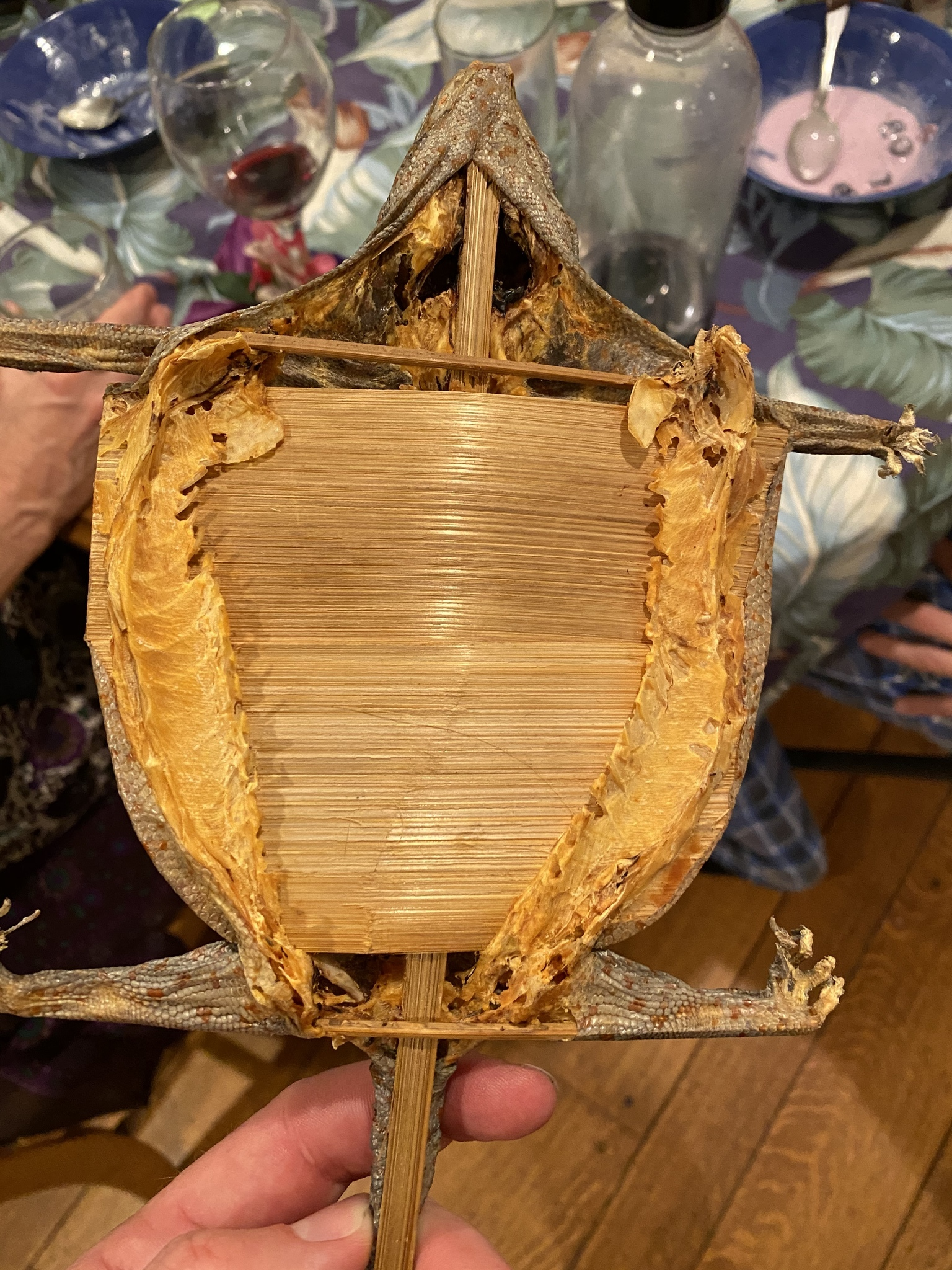
Dried tokay gecko (ventral view)

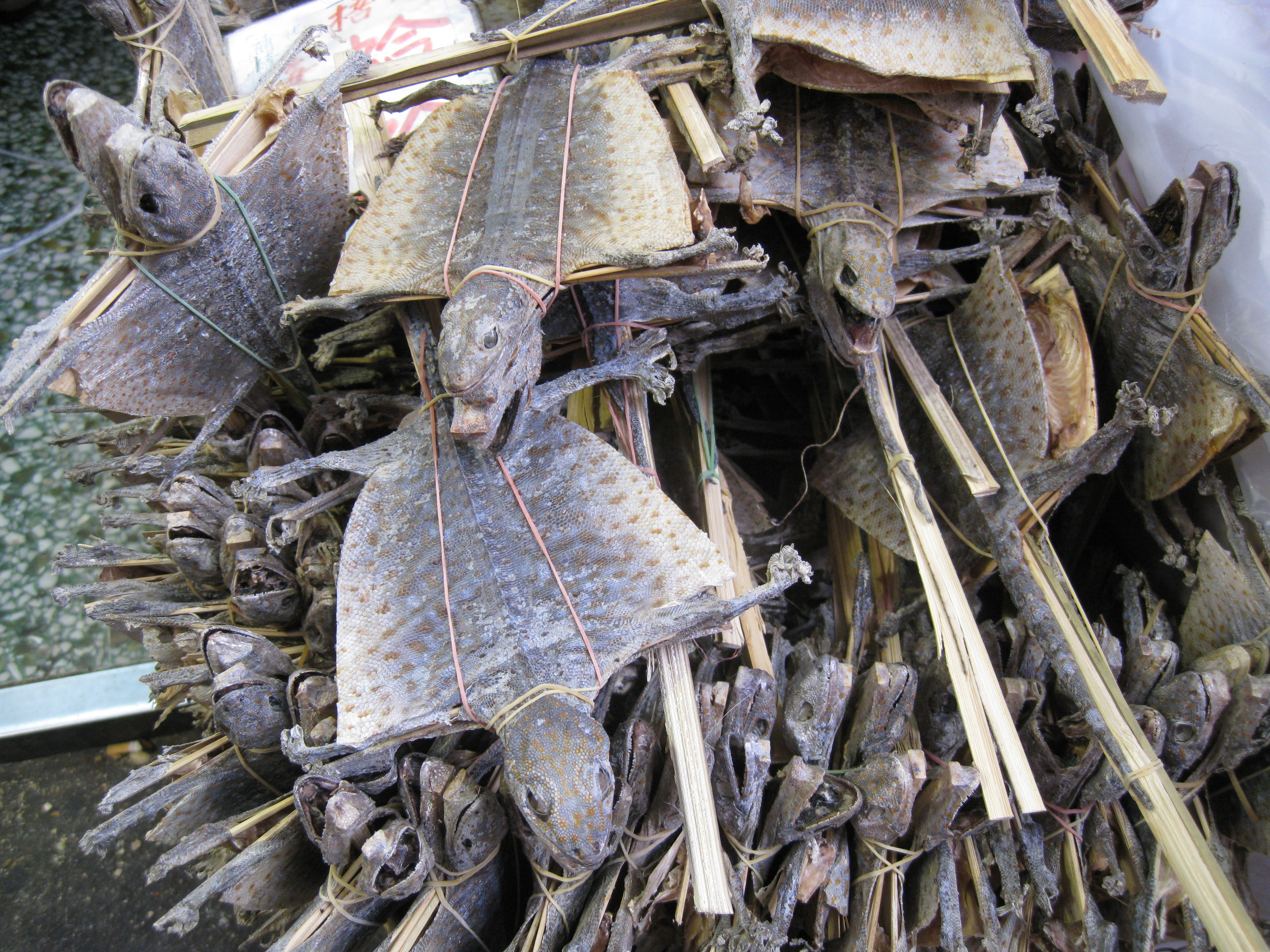
Dried tokay geckos, in Hong Kong

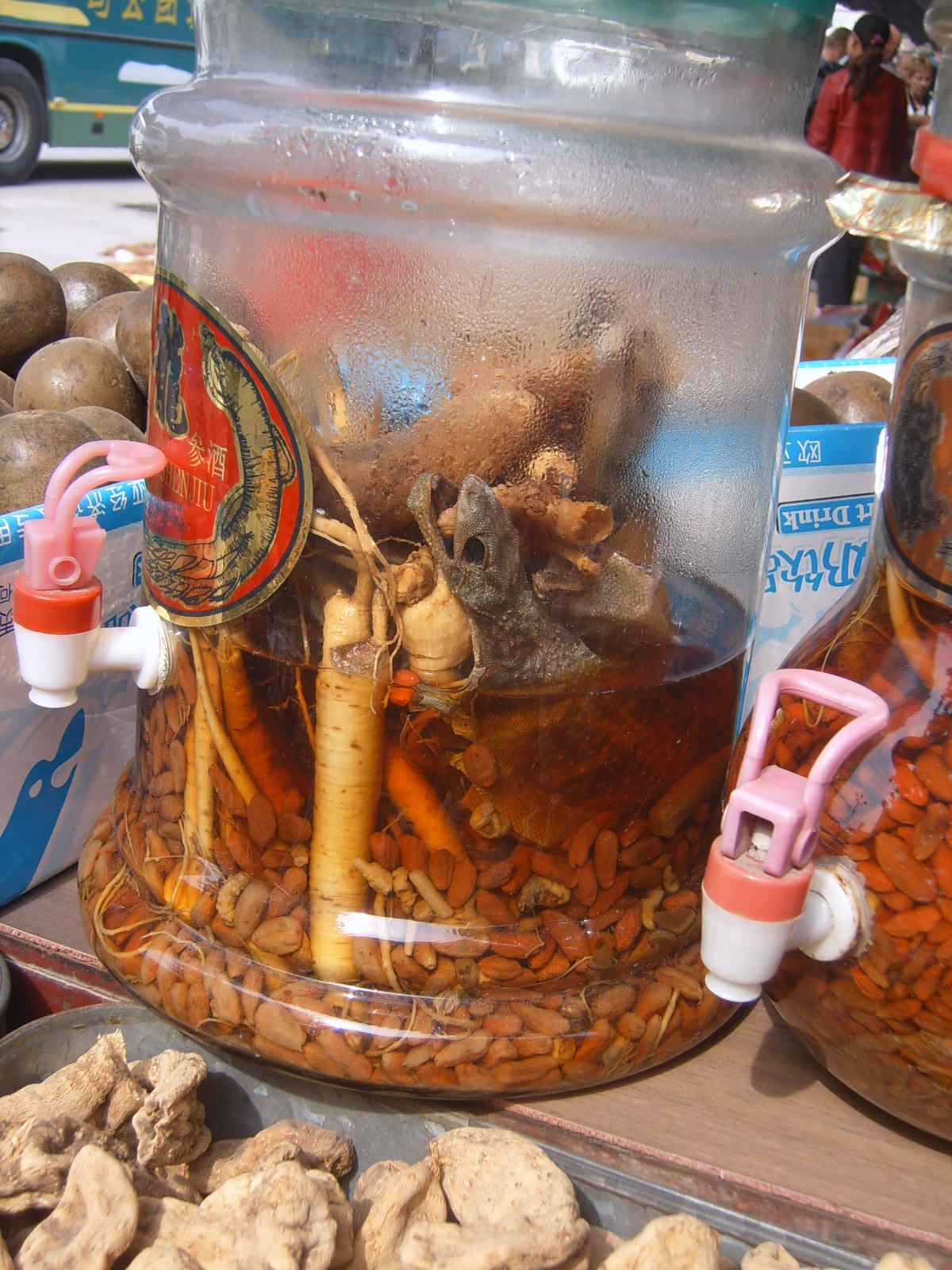
Ready-to-drink macerated medicinal liquor with goji berry, tokay gecko, and ginseng, for sale at a traditional medicine market in Xi'an, China.

== Captivity ==
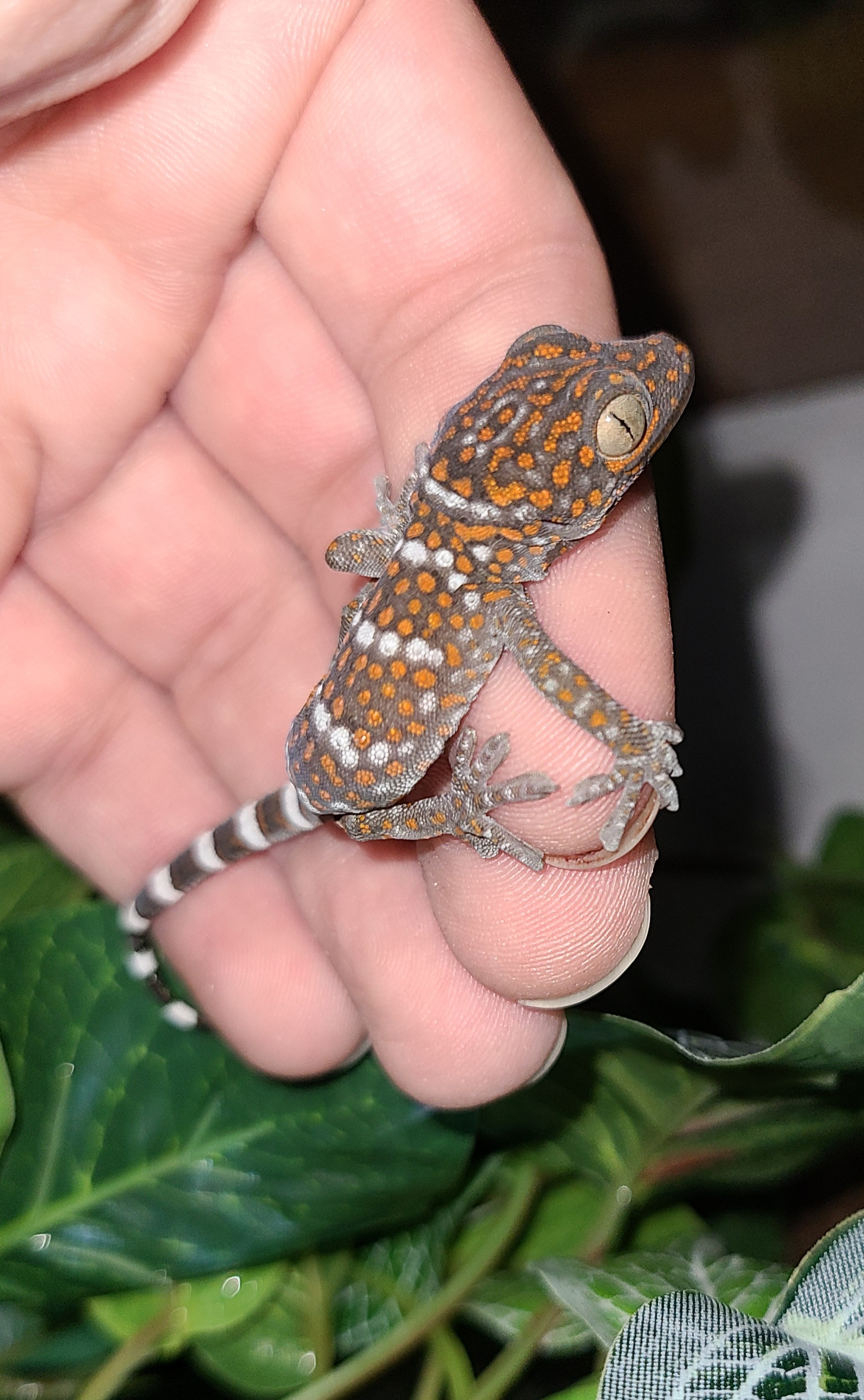
Handling a juvenile in captivity

Tokay geckos are becoming more popular as pets because of their striking colors and large size. Most of them are wild-caught imports, but captive-bred ones are becoming more common. Wild-caught adults are simple to keep in captivity, as the husbandry requirements can be fulfilled with standard hardware that is widely available from pet-supply vendors. Wild-caught tokay geckos can be difficult to handle because of their aggressive nature and powerful bite, but it has been commonly reported among hobbyists that captive-bred (those hatched in captivity from eggs laid by either wild-caught adults or by captive-raised adult progeny) tokay geckos can be less aggressive.

When well cared for, tokay geckos can live up to 10–20 years.
