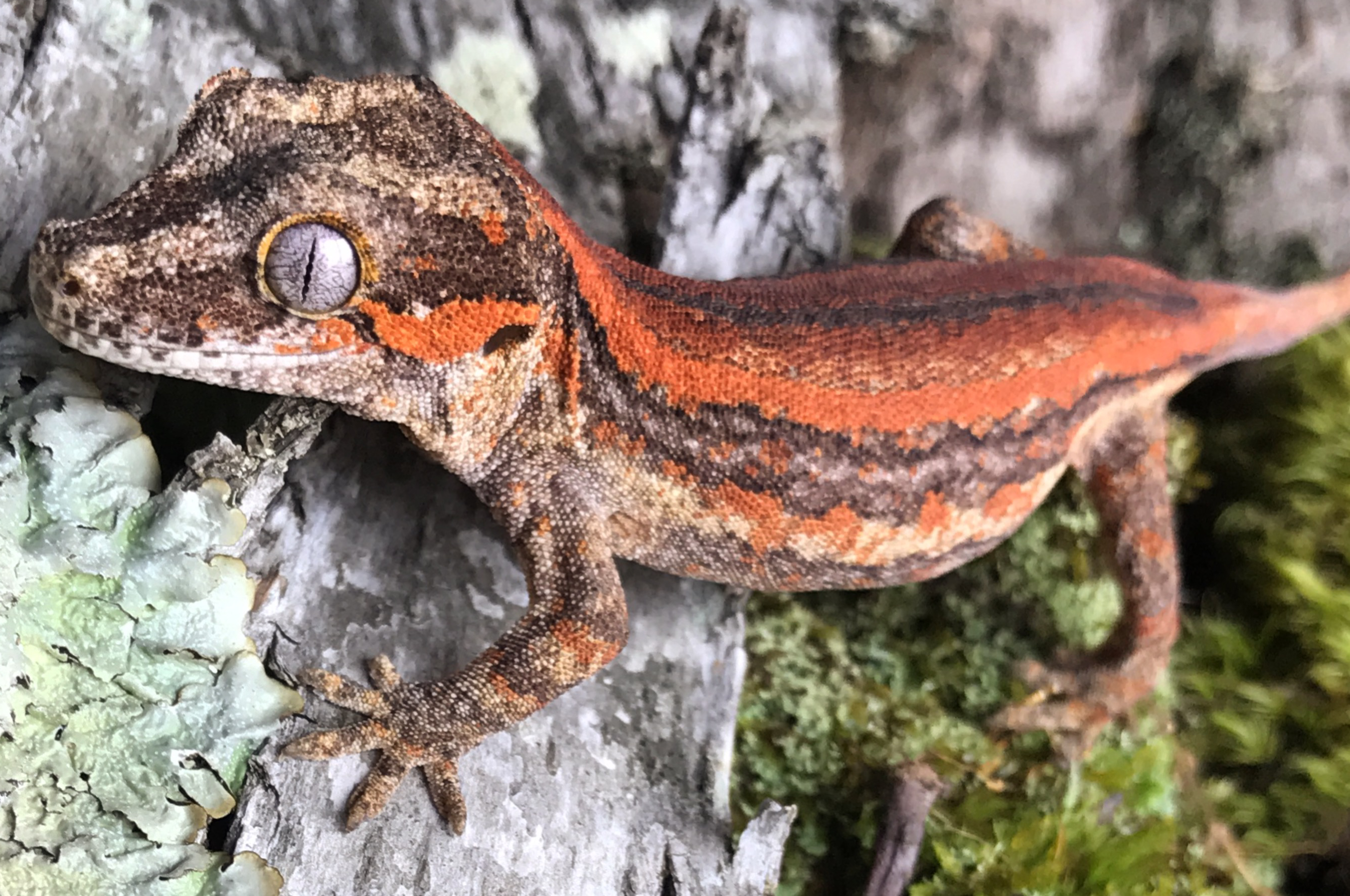

Conservation status
- Least Concern (IUCN 3.1)

Scientific classification
- Kingdom: Animalia
- Phylum: Chordata
- Class: Reptilia
- Order: Squamata
- Suborder: Gekkota
- Family: Diplodactylidae
- Genus: Rhacodactylus
- Species: R. auriculatus

Binomial name
- Rhacodactylus auriculatus (Bavay, 1869)

Synonyms
- Platydactylus auriculatus – basionym; Ceratolophus hexaceros Bocage, 1873; Gecko ceratolophus Boring et al., 1949

= Gargoyle gecko =

Species of lizard

The gargoyle gecko, knob-headed giant gecko, New Caledonia bumpy gecko, or New Caledonian bumpy gecko (Rhacodactylus auriculatus) is a species of gecko found only on the southern end of the island of New Caledonia. Its habitat is threatened by deforestation on the island. This species of gecko is the smallest of the six recognized species in its genus where they often reach about 125 mm in size. This gecko, along with several other Rhacodactylus species are being considered for protective measures by CITES, which would put restrictions on their exportation. This gecko was first described by Bavay in 1869.

== Description ==
This reptile gets its common name from the cranial bumps that give the appearance of horns or ears; in fact, auriculatus is Latin for "ears" or "eared", depending on the case. Other characteristics of this gecko include a thin prehensile tail which will regenerate if it drops off, as well as small adhesive toe pads. Although these geckos have the ability to grip vines, branches, and other obstacles, most do not have the ability to climb sheer surfaces, such as glass. As small as 1 inch (25 mm) long (from snout to vent) and weighing 3 grams at hatching, it reaches an average length of 7 inches (180 mm) to 9 inches (230 mm) and 60 to 70 grams in weight. They are considered a small to medium size gecko.

== Behavior ==
Gargoyle geckos are primarily nocturnal. They are an arboreal species, making their home in scrub forests. The female lays two eggs per clutch, which hatch 60 to 90 days after they are laid. The female can lay eight or nine clutches per year. On rare occasions, gargoyle geckos can reproduce asexually via parthenogenesis.

In their native habitat of southern New Caledonia, they have been known to sustain themselves from a mixed diet. One study found that they regularly consume a wide taxonomic and ecological variety of arthropods, lizard prey including geckos and skinks, and various plant materials including floral parts and sap.

They can propel themselves almost three times their body length to reach a vine or tree branch, yet their feet do not have as much traction as other gecko's feet do, so they slip every now and then, making them seem clumsy. Moving about is no problem to them, as long as their skin is kept moist, it will stretch and accommodate their movements.

== In captivity ==
This gecko species is commonly kept as a pet by hobbyists. They occur in many colors, including varying shades of greys, browns, white, yellow, orange, and red, with varying patterns of blotches and striping. They are commonly captive bred for particular traits of pattern and color, like many captive geckos.

== Gallery ==
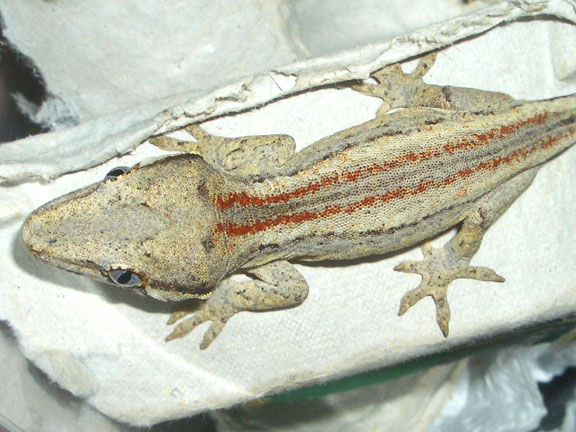
Red striped morph juvenile gargoyle gecko

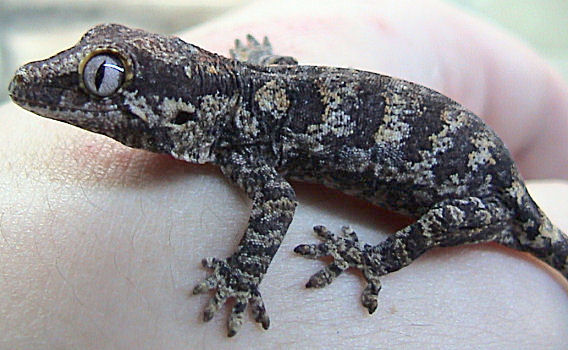
Juvenile gargoyle gecko
