= Rhacodactylus willihenkeli =

Scientific classification
- Domain: Eukaryota
- Kingdom: Animalia
- Phylum: Chordata
- Class: Reptilia
- Order: Squamata
- Infraorder: Gekkota
- Family: Diplodactylidae
- Genus: Rhacodactylus
- Species: R. willihenkeli

Binomial name
- Rhacodactylus willihenkeli Köhler & Sameit & Seipp & Geiss, 2024

Species of gecko

Rhacodactylus willihenkeli, also known as Willi's giant geckos, are a species first identified in 2023. Four live specimens were caught in 1987 in a forested area of New Caledonia by Friedrich Wilhelm Henkel and Joachim Sameit. They kept the geckos in a terrarium. Three of the four original specimens were still alive in 2023 when DNA analysis conclusively determined them to be a unique species. These individuals bred while in captivity on multiple occasions. The females would lay approximately 6–8 eggs a year which would then hatch about 90 days later. These eggs were not laid all at once but in three to four intervals throughout the year. Their full adult size is one foot long. The species is most genetically similar to Rhacodactylus leachianus but has different colouration.
