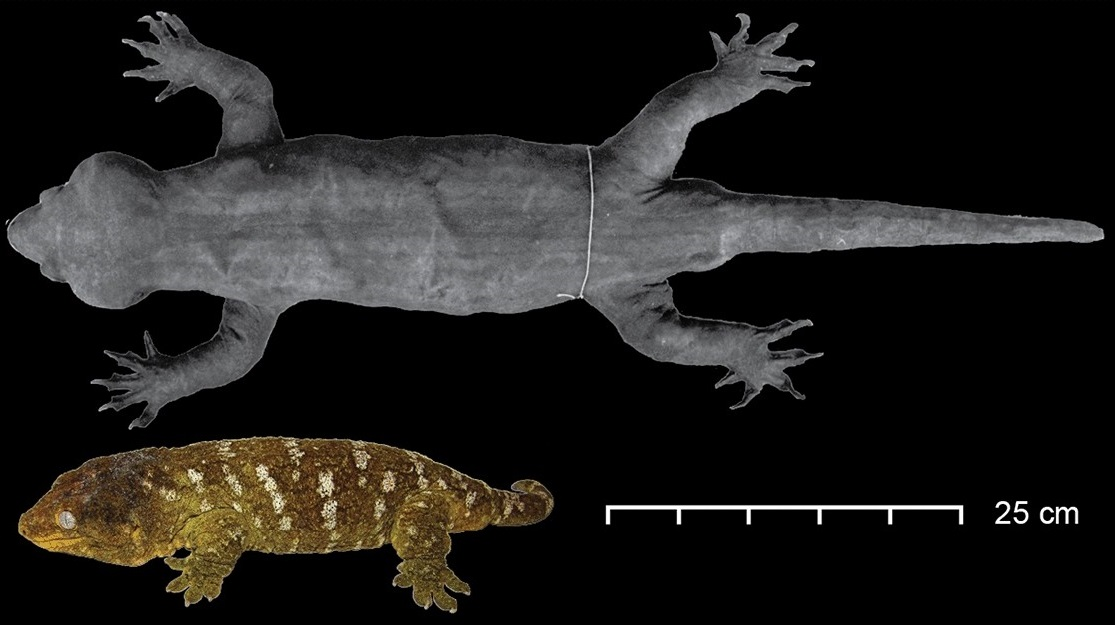
- Size comparison of the holotype (top) with Rhacodactylus leachianus

Conservation status
- Extinct (19th century) (IUCN 3.1)

Scientific classification
- Kingdom: Animalia
- Phylum: Chordata
- Class: Reptilia
- Order: Squamata
- Suborder: Gekkota
- Family: Diplodactylidae
- Genus: †Gigarcanum; Heinicke et al., 2023
- Species: †G. delcourti

Binomial name
- †Gigarcanum delcourti (Bauer & Russell, 1986)

Synonyms
- Hoplodactylus delcourti Bauer & Russell, 1986

= Gigarcanum =

Extinct species of lizard

Gigarcanum delcourti, formerly Hoplodactylus delcourti, is an extinct species of gecko in the family Diplodactylidae. It is the largest known of all geckos, with a snout-to-vent length (SVL) of 37 cm (14.6 in) and an overall length (including tail) of at least 60 cm (23.6 in). It is only known from a single taxidermied specimen collected in the 19th century that was rediscovered unlabelled in a museum in France. The origin of the specimen was undocumented. While originally suggested to have been from New Zealand and the kawekaweau of Māori oral tradition, DNA evidence from the specimen suggests that it originates from New Caledonia.

== History of research and taxonomy ==
Comparison between the femora of R. leachianus (left) and Gigarcanum

According to the 1873 report of Major William Gilbert Mair, in 1870, a Māori chief said that he had killed a kaweau that he found under the bark of a dead rātā tree in the Waimana Valley in Te Urewera on the North Island of New Zealand. This is the only documented report of anyone ever seeing a kawekaweau alive. Mair reported the chief's description of the animal as being "two feet long, and as thick as a man's wrist; colour brown, striped longitudinally with dull red".

A single stuffed specimen was "discovered" in the basement of the Natural History Museum of Marseille in 1986; the origins and date of collection of the specimen remain a mystery, as it was unlabelled when it was found. It has been present in the collection of the museum since at least the 1870s, and likely since the 1830s based on its unusual preservation style of being eviscerated, dried and mounted, rather than being kept in spirits as is more common for preserved specimens. The specimen is missing the internal organs and most of the axial skeleton (primarily the spinal column), but retains the skull and appendicular skeleton (the limb bones). In the same year, the specimen was described as the new species Hoplodactylus delcourti by Aaron Matthew Bauer and Anthony Patrick Russell, who suggested that it was from New Zealand and was likely the lost kawekaweau, a giant and mysterious forest lizard of Māori oral tradition. The specific epithet delcourti was taken from the surname of French museum worker Alain Delcourt, who found the forgotten specimen in the Marseille museum.

Character maps based on toe pad and skin type, with comparisons of toe pads below; Gigarcanum is center left

Attempts to extract DNA from the sole specimen in 1994 were unsuccessful. Trevor Worthy suggested in 2016 that the specimen originated on an island of New Caledonia rather than New Zealand, due to a lack of fossil evidence for the lizard in New Zealand caves despite abundant remains of all other known species of New Zealand gecko. It was omitted from the Conservation Status of New Zealand Reptiles, 2021 on the basis that it was likely to be from New Caledonia. This was confirmed by the successful sequencing of the specimen's mitochondrial DNA in 2023, which found that it was nested within the New Caledonian species of Diplodactylidae rather than the New Zealand species, and distinctive enough to warrant placement in the new genus Gigarcanum. According to the authors, the genus name Gigarcanum derives from "a combination of two words: the Latin adjective gigas, meaning giant and taken from the Ancient Greek Γίγᾱς, and the Latin noun arcanum, meaning secret or mystery. The combination refers to the size of the type species and the unknown provenance of the only known specimen". In the DNA analysis, the relationships of New Caledonian geckos were poorly resolved, but Gigarcanum was usually found to be most closely related to the New Caledonia genera Eurydactylodes, Mniarogekko and/or Rhacodactylus.

== Description ==
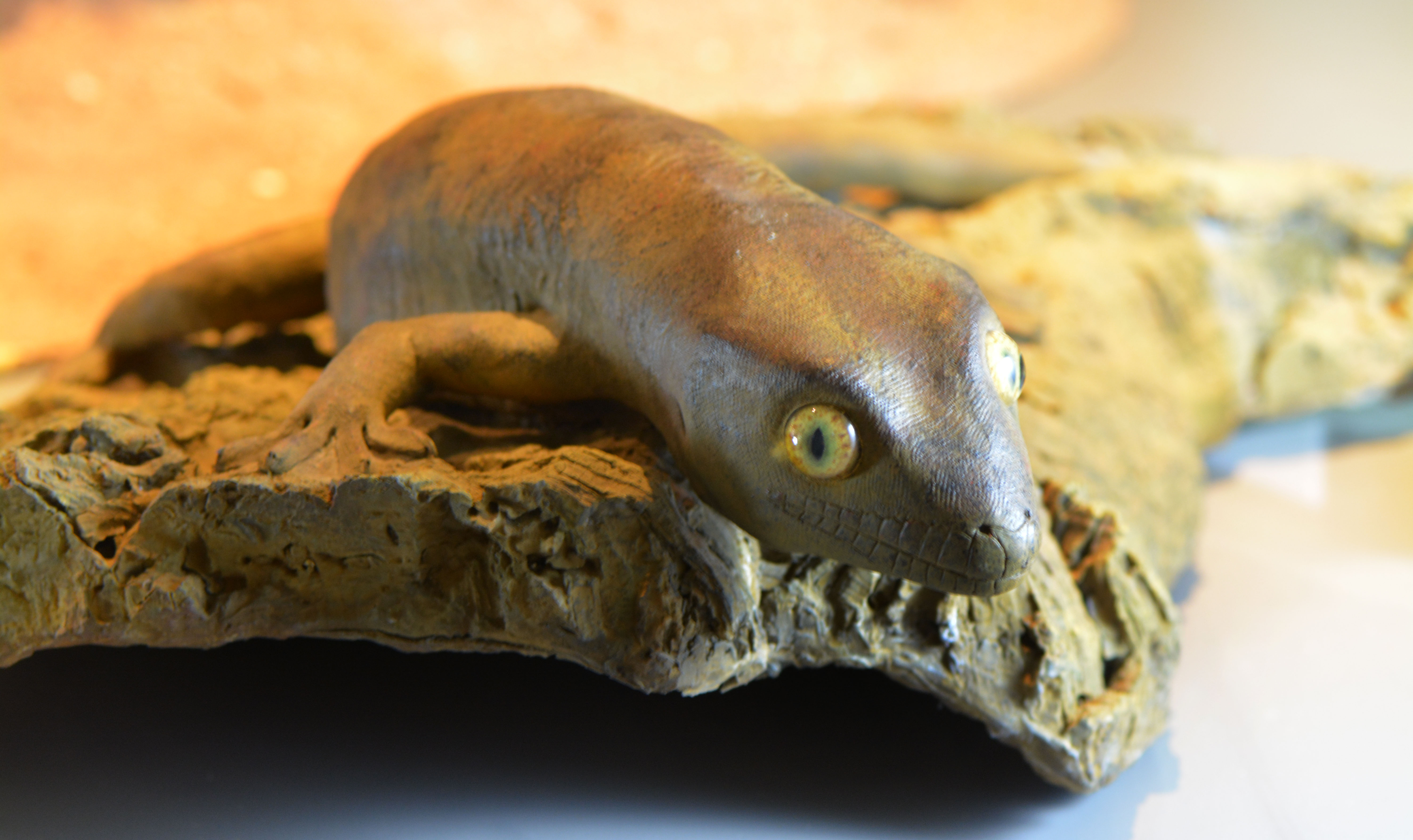
Model in Lille Natural History Museum

Gigarcanum delcourti is 50% longer and was likely several times heavier than the largest living gecko, the also New Caledonian Rhacodactylus leachianus, with a snout-to-vent length (SVL, which measures from the tip of the snout to the back edge of the reproductive and defecatory cloacal opening) of 37 cm (14.6 in) and an overall length (including tail) of at least 60 cm (23.6 in). The body is robust, and the tail is tapering, cylindrical and weakly annulated. The skull is large, and makes up about 20% of the SVL. The digits bear claws, and are weakly-moderately webbed. The digit pads are rectangular and broad. The body colour is yellowish-brown, with dark reddish-brown stripes running along the length of the upper body.

== Ecology ==
Based on comparison with its living relatives, it was probably a nocturnal arboreal animal that climbed trees. It probably had a diet mainly of arthropods, but possibly also seasonally consumed fruit. It likely had a clutch size of two, as all other known New Caledonian geckos do, though whether it was oviparous or viviparous is uncertain.

== Extinction ==
Gigarcanum delcourti was likely extinct or extremely rare by the time of the colonisation of New Caledonia by Europeans in the mid 19th century, due to the absence of any other records of the species.
