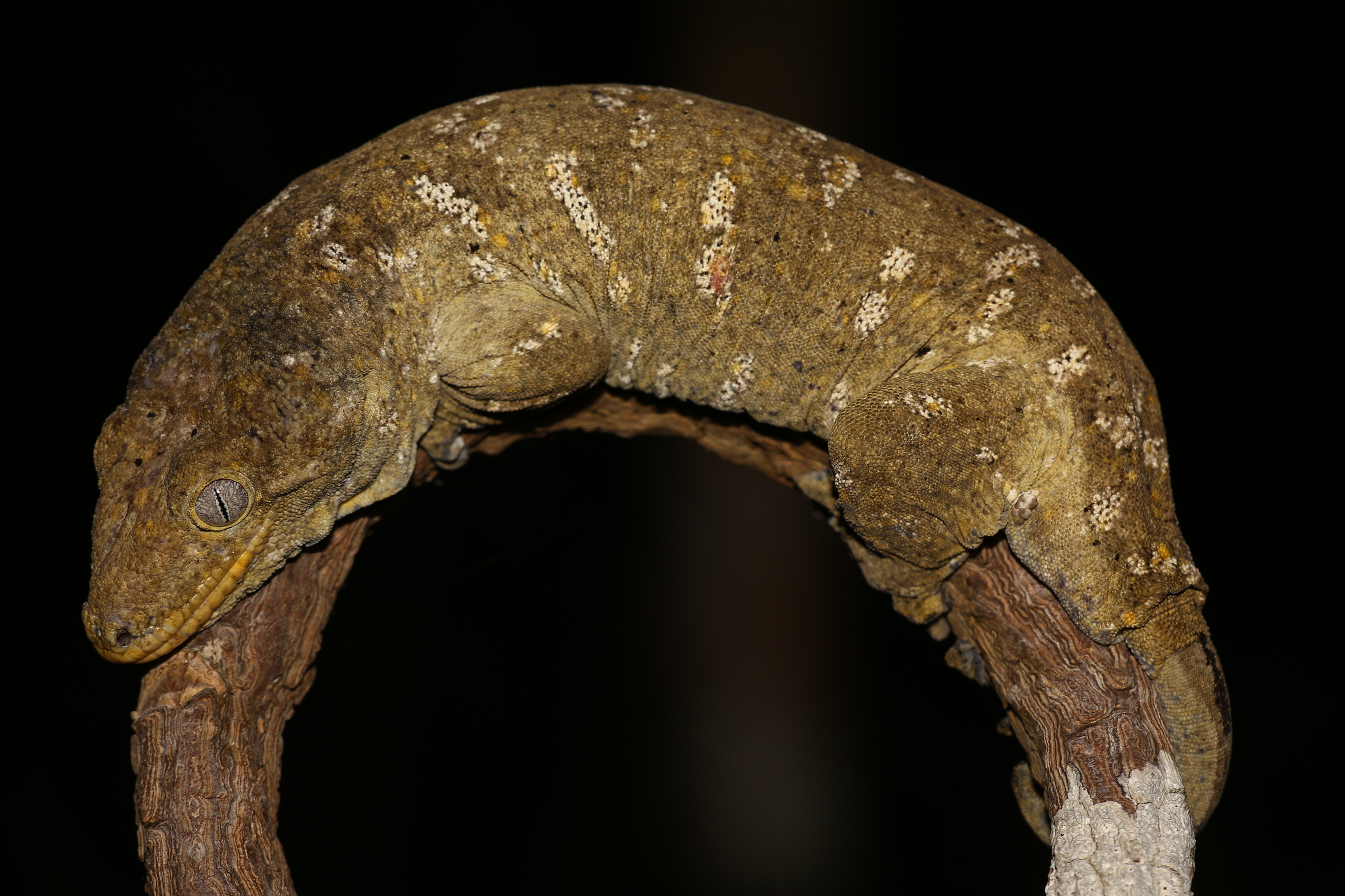

Conservation status
- Least Concern (IUCN 3.1)

Scientific classification
- Kingdom: Animalia
- Phylum: Chordata
- Class: Reptilia
- Order: Squamata
- Suborder: Gekkota
- Family: Diplodactylidae
- Genus: Rhacodactylus
- Species: R. leachianus

Binomial name
- Rhacodactylus leachianus (Cuvier, 1829)
- Approximate distribution (New Caledonia, Oceania) Range

Synonyms
- List: Ascalabotes leachianus Cuvier, 1829; Pteropleura leachianus — Gray, 1831; Lomadactylus leachianus — van der Hoeven, 1833; Gecko leachii Schinz, 1834; Platydactylus leachianus — Wiegmann, 1834; Hoplodactylus leachianus — Fitzinger, 1843; Rhacodactylus leachianus — Bocage, 1873

= Rhacodactylus leachianus =

Species of lizard

Rhacodactylus leachianus, commonly known as the New Caledonian giant gecko, Leach's giant gecko, leachianus gecko, or Leachie, is the largest living species of gecko and a member of the family Diplodactylidae. It is native to most of New Caledonia.

== Taxonomy ==
The specific name, leachianus, is in honor of English zoologist William Elford Leach. Historically, there have been three recognized subspecies of R. leachianus (including the nominotypical subspecies): R. l. aubrianus, R. l. henkeli (first described by Seipp and Obst in 1994), and R. l. leachianus. However, based on recent molecular data, no populations of R. leachianus are granted subspecies status at the present time. Instead, locality based morphotypes are used to distinguish populations of R. leachianus.

== Description ==
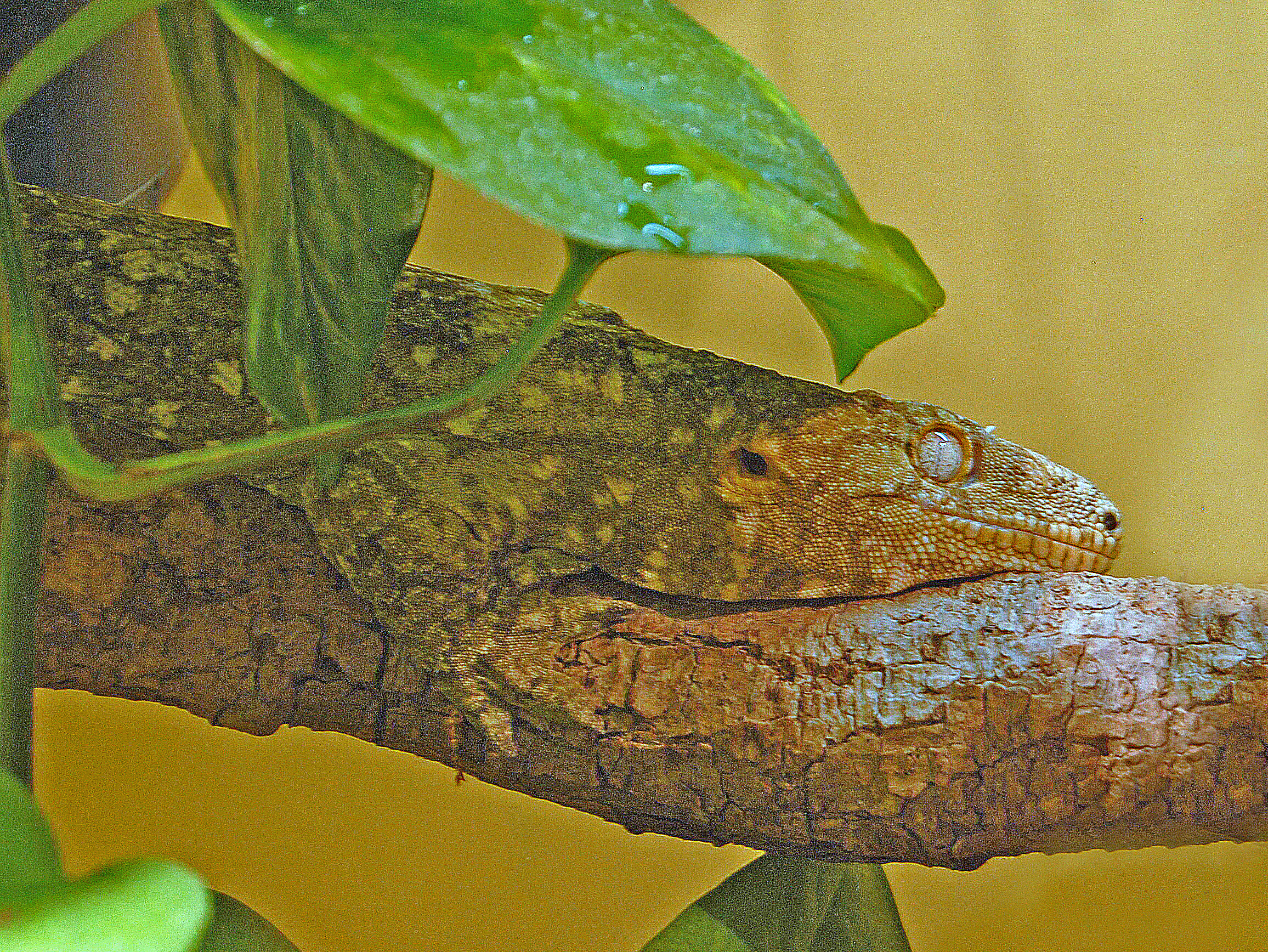
Close-up of the New Caledonian giant gecko

R. leachianus is the largest extant gecko in the world and is considered an example of island gigantism. R. leachianus of the Grande Terre localities are capable of growing 14–17 inches (360–430 mm) long, with a weight range between 250 and 500 grams. R. leachianus of the Insular localities are capable of growing 9–12" (23–30 cm) long, and weighting between 150 and 300 grams. It has a heavy body, loose skin, and a small, stumpy tail. It is variable in color, coming in shades of mottled green, gray, and brown, sometimes with highlights of white, orange, and/or pink. It was only exceeded in size by the now extinct Gigarcanum delcourti known from a single specimen 50% longer and probably several times heavier than the largest R. leachianus specimens, which also originated from New Caledonia.

== Distribution and habitat ==
R. leachianus is found in all of the southern and eastern portions of the main island of New Caledonia, as well as on several of the smaller islands in the group. Topographical and ecological differences observed at each locality may have contributed to the phenotypical and morphological differences seen in R. leachianus. The insular locality of Duu Ana is thought to no longer have an extant population of R. leachianus.

== Biology ==
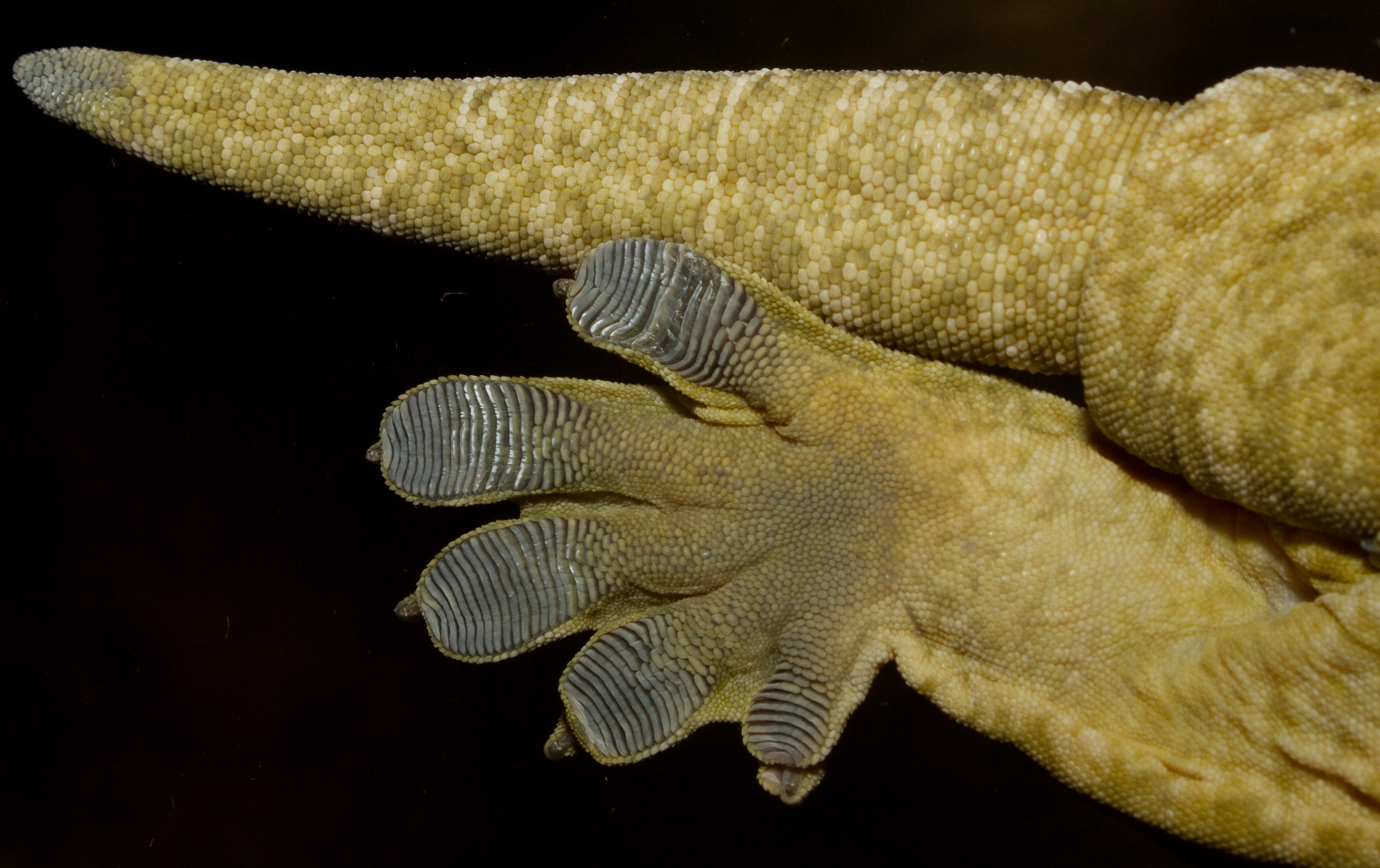
The ventral side of an R. leachianus foot pad displaying lamellae

R. leachianus is an arboreal species; it is primarily nocturnal and remains hidden in tree hollows during the day. it has a diet that includes insects, spiders, small vertebrates, fruit, nectar, and sap. The most common component of R. leachianus diet consists of the fruit from Cassine curtipendula, a small fruit with a large seed that is often seen in fecal matter. It is speculated that the elongated snouts of mainland locality R. leachianus suggest a diet model that contains more vertebrate and insect matter than their insular locality counter-parts. Records of cannibalism among R. leachianus have been recorded, but this phenomenon could be attributed to territorial defense. These giant geckos can climb vertically up glass surfaces. This is due to adhesive pads on their feet called lamellae, which are made up of tiny hairs which increase friction force when applied to surfaces. R. leachianus also possess large claws that aid in climbing. R. leachianus are capable of dropping their tail, a self-amputation process known as autotomy. Unlike Correlophus cilliatus, R. leachianus are capable of tail regeneration through a process known as epimorphosis. Males and females of R. leachianus display differentiating morphological characteristics known as sexual dimorphism. Male R. leachianus display a hemipenal bulge at the base of the tail, whereas females do not have this bulge. R. leachianus is observed to have temperature dependent sex determination. In captivity, eggs with a sustained incubated at 85 °F (29 °C) will often result in male offspring, and eggs that have a sustained incubation temperature of 72 °F (22 °C) will result in female offspring.

=== Mating behavior and reproduction ===
Popular lore within the enthusiast lay community has promoted the notion that R. leachianus may pair monogamously in the wild and may remain compatible and establish a pair-bond, which may last for a single breeding season or persist for several years. In captivity, some hobbyists have responded to this notion of pair-bonding by keeping successful pairs together until the animals display incompatibility (fighting, injury, abject sequester by conspecific), at which time the bond-broken animals are separated permanently or reintroduced to one another at a later date (or introduced to different animals) in an attempt to establish a new pair-bond. It remains unclear whether the pair-bond is a real phenomenon for R. leachianus. Reports from the expeditions of herpetoculturalists philippe De Vosjoli, Frank Fast, and Bill Love, provide multiple accounts of monogamous pair bonding activity, as investigated tree hollows often housed a single pair of leachianus that remained for several weeks. Breeding behavior involves biting and thrashing that can become violent, often accompanied with locking jaws. The popular notion is that these behaviors may serve to test for pair compatibility and physical capability of a mate. However, it remains unclear whether the level of savagery witnessed in captivity is present in the wild populations. The necessary limits of an otherwise healthy captive environment may disallow some natural thresholds required for the resolution of conflict between conspecifics (for example, the natural required distance of separation may exceed the space limits in a captive setting). In the wild, a male-female pair of R. leachianus will commonly reside in an otherwise unoccupied tree hollow, which the pair will defend by displaying territorial behavior, such as vocalization. Tree hollow related behavior is similar to that of hollow nesting birds. Mate identification is thought to be done through a process called scent marking. Adult females of R. leachianus usually lay two eggs at a time (universal trait for all geckos), having up to 10 clutches per year. Older females in captivity may not lay clutches in a breeding season, even when paired with a compatible male. However, older females can lay clutches over the course of their entire adult lifespan. Pair incompatibility in a previously compatible pair may occur, often indicated by aggressive territorial behavior and injury. There have been reports of parthenogenesis in unpaired females in captivity, with some parthenogenic offspring reaching maturity with no apparent defects.

=== Vocalization ===
R. leachianus have the widest range of vocalizations of any member of the gekkonidae family. R. leachianus can make a loud growling noise, and local people call it "the devil in the trees". This growling vocalization is speculated to be a warning call is often made in the presence of a predator or a rivaling R. leachianus. Clucking is another common vocalization, commonly associated with mate calling, often heard at night. A light whistle sound is used to display discomfort, or mild stress. Bird-like chirping is seen in the larger mainland localities, which incorporates a heightened stance and a gaping mouth for a threat display, often followed by a lunging motion.

=== Coloration and camouflage ===
Many lizards exhibit an ability to alter the hue and/or intensity of skin color (chameleons are the extreme example), and New Caledonian Geckos are no exception. This phenomenon is facilitated by pigment-containing cells called chromatophores. This is a form of camouflage and can help the gecko blend into their environments. Various factors may contribute to this change in skin color, including the endocrine system or environmental factors such as variations in sunlight and temperature.

== Folklore ==
Some of the indigenous Kanak people of New Caledonia fear Leach's giant gecko. This is because of an old superstition which purports that it has the ability to cling to a person's body and pull out that person's soul.

== Conservation status ==
Populations of the species R. leachianus have likely been reduced by habitat destruction and degradation. This process is still a threat to the species. It also faces predation by introduced species such as cats and various rodents. It is also poached. It can be electrocuted when it travels along power lines. This species is protected and it lives in several nature reserves.

== In captivity ==
The New Caledonian giant gecko is occasionally kept as a pet. Individuals in the pet trade are propagated with captive breeding; wild populations are protected. This species may live over 20 years in captivity, with some individuals reaching up to 50 years old. Selective breeding for the pet trade has continued to maintain pure locality R. leachianus in captivity, with the addition of locality cross-breeding to create desirable phenotypes, such as dramatic coloration, size, and structure.

== See also ==
- Rhacodactylus willihenkeli
