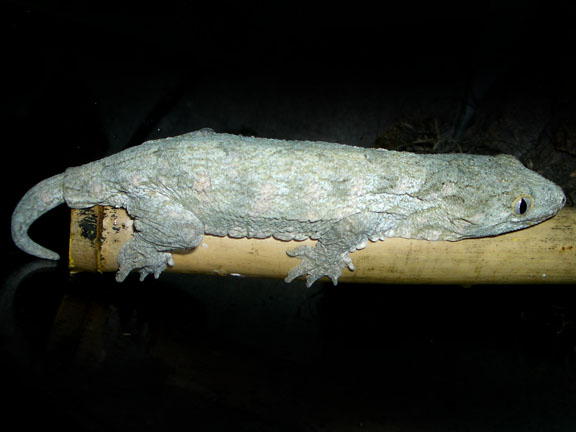
- Rhacodactylus leachianus

Scientific classification
- Kingdom: Animalia
- Phylum: Chordata
- Class: Reptilia
- Order: Squamata
- Suborder: Gekkota
- Family: Diplodactylidae
- Genus: Rhacodactylus; Fitzinger, 1843

Species
- See text.

= Rhacodactylus =

Genus of lizards

Rhacodactylus is a genus of medium to large geckos of the family Diplodactylidae. All species in this genus are found on the islands that make up New Caledonia.

Genus characteristics include long limbs and toes with well-developed lamellae. Some webbing occurs on the hind limbs and toes. Rhacodactylus possess prehensile tails which also have lamellae to assist in climbing. These are for the most part arboreal geckos. Rhacodactylus are nocturnal geckos.

The species are egg layers with the exception of Rhacodactylus trachyrhynchus and R. trachycephalus which gives live birth, a characteristic only otherwise found in New Zealand geckos. They also feed on lizards, more so than any of the family. Rhacodactylus geckos are sexually dimorphic, with the males possessing larger preanal pores than the females as well as a distinct hemipenis pocket.

Males tend to be stockier than females with the exception of R. auriculatus in which species the males are much slimmer than the females.

== Classification ==
- Gargoyle gecko, Rhacodactylus auriculatus
- New Caledonian giant gecko, Rhacodactylus leachianus
  - Rhacodactylus leachianus aubrianus
  - Rhacodactylus leachianus henkeli
  - Rhacodactylus leachianus leachianus
- Greater rough-snouted giant gecko, Rhacodactylus trachyrhynchus
- Lesser rough-snouted giant gecko, Rhacodactylus trachycephalus
- Willi's giant gecko, Rhacodactylus willihenkeli

A revision of the giant geckos of New Caledonia found weak support for inclusion of some taxa allied to this genus, and these have been assigned to new combinations:

- Correlophus ciliatus, crested gecko; formerly R. ciliatus
- Correlophus sarasinorum; formerly R. sarasinorum
- Mniarogekko chahoua; formerly R. chahoua

== Captivity ==
The species are regarded as charismatic and popular with herpetologists. Details of the behaviour of these geckos in captivity, contrasted with a paucity of field observations, has produced extensive literature on the genus.

== Literature ==
- Bauer AM, Jackman TR, Sadlier RA, Whitaker AH. (2012). Revision of the giant geckos of New Caledonia (Reptilia: Diplodactylidae: Rhacodactylus). Zootaxa 3404: 1–52.
- Fitzinger L. (1843). Systema Reptilium, Fasciculus Primus, Amblyglossae. Vienna: Braumüller & Seidel. 106 pp. + indices. (Genus Rhacodactylus, p. 100).
- Seipp, Robert; Henkel, Friedrich Wilhelm. (2000). Rhacodactylus - Biologie, Haltung und Zucht; mit einem farbigen Anhang weiterer Geckoarten Neukaledoniens. Frankfurt am Main: Edition Chimaira. 173 pp. ISBN 3-930612-23-2.
- de Vosjoli, Phillippe; Fast, Frank; Repashy, Allen. (2003). Rhacodactylus - The Complete Guide to their Selection and Care. Vista, California: Advanced Vision Inc. 296 pp. ISBN 0-9742971-0-0.
