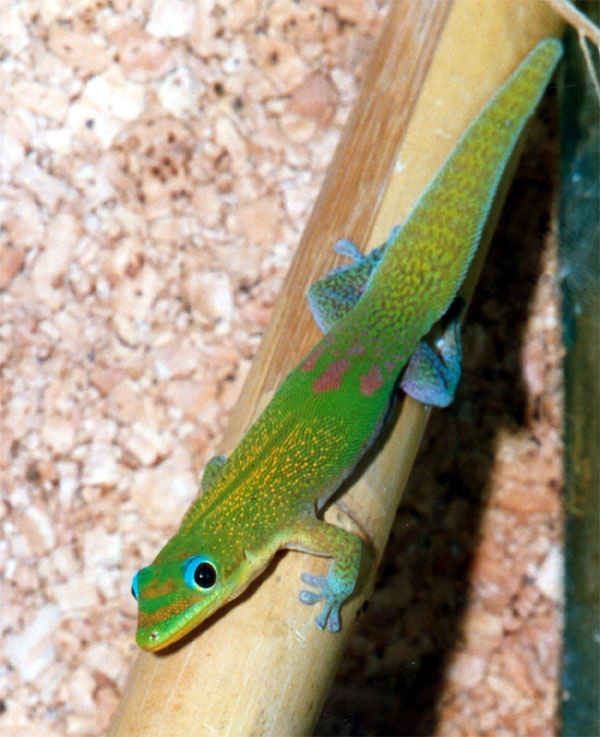
- Gold dust day gecko

Scientific classification
- Kingdom: Animalia
- Phylum: Chordata
- Class: Reptilia
- Order: Squamata
- Clade: Gekkonomorpha
- Suborder: Gekkota; Cuvier, 1817

Subgroups
- Pygopodoidea; Carphodactylidae; Diplodactylidae; Pygopodidae; Gekkonoidea; Eublepharidae; Gekkonidae; Phyllodactylidae; Sphaerodactylidae

= Gecko =

Gecko Temporal range: 100–0 Ma Cenomanian – present Stem-groups present since Aptian-Albian

Lizards belonging to the suborder Gekkota

Geckos (/ˈɡɛkoʊ/ GHEHK-oh) are small, mostly carnivorous lizards that have a wide distribution, found on every continent except Antarctica. Belonging to the suborder Gekkota, geckos are found in warm climates. They range from 1.6 to 67 centimetres (0.6 to 26.4 inches) in length. They are the most species-rich group of lizards, with nearly 2,000 different species of geckos existing.

Geckos are unique among lizards for their vocalisations, which differ from species to species. Most geckos in the family Gekkonidae use chirping or clicking sounds in their social interactions. Tokay geckos (Gekko gecko) are known for their loud mating calls, and some other species are capable of making hissing noises when alarmed or threatened.

All geckos, except species in the family Eublepharidae, lack eyelids; instead, the outer surface of the eyeball has a transparent membrane, the brille. They have a fixed lens within each iris that enlarges in darkness to let in more light. Since they cannot blink, species without eyelids generally lick their own brilles when they need to clear them of dust and dirt, in order to keep them clean and moist.

Unlike most lizards, geckos are usually nocturnal and have excellent night vision; their colour vision in low light is 350 times more sensitive than human eyes. The nocturnal geckos evolved from diurnal species, which had lost the rod cells from their eyes. The gecko eye, therefore, modified its cone cells that increased in size into different types, both single and double. Three different photo-pigments have been retained, and are sensitive to ultraviolet, blue, and green. They also use a multifocal optical system that allows them to generate a sharp image for at least two different depths. While most gecko species are nocturnal, some species are diurnal and active during the day, which have evolved multiple times independently.

Many species are well known for their specialised toe pads, which enable them to grab and climb onto smooth and vertical surfaces, and even cross indoor ceilings with ease. Geckos are well known to people who live in warm regions of the world, where several species make their home inside human habitations. These, for example the house gecko, become part of the indoor menagerie and are often welcomed, as they feed on insect pests including moths and mosquitoes. Like most lizards, geckos can defensively shed their tail; the predator may attack the wriggling tail, allowing the gecko to escape.

The largest species, Gigarcanum delcourti, is only known from a single, stuffed specimen probably collected in the 19th century found in the basement of the Natural History Museum of Marseille in Marseille, France. This gecko was 60 centimetres (24 inches) long, and was likely endemic to New Caledonia, where it lived in native forests. The smallest gecko, the Jaragua sphaero, is a mere 16 millimetres (0.63 inches) long and was discovered in 2001 on a small island off the coast of Hispaniola.

== Etymology ==
The Neo-Latin gekko and English 'gecko' stem from Malaysian gēkoq, a Malay word borrowed from Malay, from tokek, which imitates the sounds that some species like Tokay gecko make.

== Common traits ==
Like other reptiles, geckos are ectothermic, producing very little metabolic heat. Essentially, a gecko's body temperature is dependent on its environment. To accomplish bodily functions such as locomotion, feeding or reproduction, geckos must maintain an elevated body temperature.

=== Shedding or molting ===
Video of leopard gecko shedding skin

All geckos shed their skin at fairly regular intervals, with species differing in timing and method. Leopard geckos shed at about two- to four-week intervals. The presence of moisture aids in the shedding. When shedding begins, the gecko speeds the process by detaching the loose skin from its body and eating it. For young geckos, shedding occurs more frequently, once a week, but when they are fully grown, they shed once every one to two months.

=== Adhesion ability ===
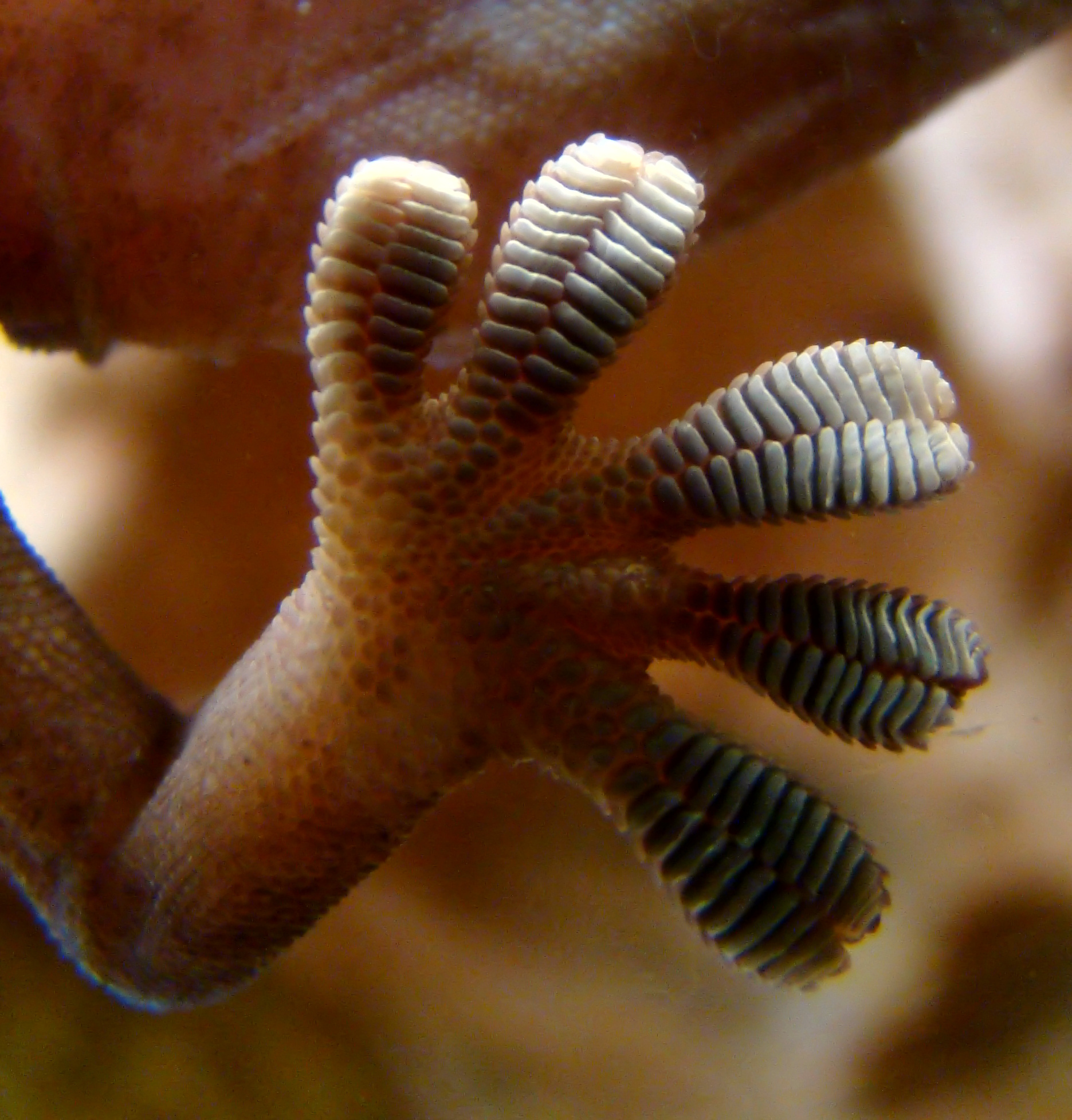
Close-up of the underside of a gecko's foot as it walks on vertical glass

About 60% of gecko species have adhesive toepads which allow them to adhere to most surfaces without the use of liquids or surface tension. Such pads have been gained and lost repeatedly over the course of gecko evolution. Adhesive toepads evolved independently in about eleven different gecko lineages, and were lost in at least nine lineages.

It was previously thought that the spatula-shaped setae arranged in lamellae on gecko footpads enable attractive van der Waals' forces (the weakest of the weak chemical forces) between the β-keratin lamellae / setae / spatulae structures and the surface. These van der Waals interactions involve no fluids; in theory, a boot made of synthetic setae would adhere as easily to the surface of the International Space Station as it would to a living-room wall, although adhesion varies with humidity. However, a 2014 study suggests that gecko adhesion is in fact mainly determined by electrostatic interaction (caused by contact electrification), not van der Waals or capillary forces.

The setae on the feet of geckos are also self-cleaning, and usually remove any clogging dirt within a few steps. Polytetrafluoroethylene (PTFE), which has very low surface energy, is more difficult for geckos to adhere to than many other surfaces.

Gecko adhesion is typically improved by higher humidity, even on hydrophobic surfaces, yet is reduced under conditions of complete immersion in water. The role of water in that system is under discussion, yet recent experiments agree that the presence of molecular water layers (water molecules carry a very large dipole moment) on the setae, as well as on the surface, increase the surface energy of both, therefore the energy gain in getting these surfaces in contact is enlarged, which results in an increased gecko adhesion force. Moreover, the elastic properties of the b-keratin change with water uptake.

Gecko toes seem to be double-jointed, but this is a misnomer, and is properly called digital hyperextension. Gecko toes can hyperextend in the opposite direction from human fingers and toes. This allows them to overcome the van der Waals force by peeling their toes off surfaces from the tips inward. In essence, by this peeling action, the gecko separates spatula by spatula from the surface, so for each spatula separation, only some force necessary. (The process is similar to removing sticky tape from a surface.)

Gecko toes operate well below their full attractive capabilities most of the time, because the margin for error is great depending upon the surface roughness, and therefore the number of setae in contact with that surface.

Use of small van der Waals force requires very large surface areas; every square millimetre of a gecko's footpad contains about 14,000 hair-like setae. Each seta has a diameter of 5 μm. Human hair varies from 18 to 180 μm, so the cross-sectional area of a human hair is equivalent to 12 to 1300 setae. Each seta is in turn tipped with between 100 and 1,000 spatulae. Each spatula is 0.2 μm long (one five-millionth of a metre), or just below the wavelength of visible light.

The setae of a typical mature 70-gram (2.5-ounce) gecko would be capable of supporting a weight of 133 kilograms (293 pounds): each spatula could exert an adhesive force of 5 to 25 nN. The exact value of the adhesion force of a spatula varies with the surface energy of the substrate to which it adheres. Recent studies have moreover shown that the component of the surface energy derived from long-range forces, such as van der Waals forces, depends on the material's structure below the outermost atomic layers (up to 100 nm beneath the surface); taking that into account, the adhesive strength can be inferred.

Apart from the setae, phospholipids; fatty substances produced naturally in their bodies, also come into play. These lipids lubricate the setae and allow the gecko to detach its foot before the next step.

The origin of gecko adhesion likely started as simple modifications to the epidermis on the underside of the toes. This was recently discovered in the genus Gonatodes from South America. Simple elaborations of the epidermal spinules into setae have enabled Gonatodes humeralis to climb smooth surfaces and sleep on smooth leaves.

Biomimetic technologies designed to mimic gecko adhesion could produce reusable self-cleaning dry adhesives with many applications. Development effort is being put into these technologies, but manufacturing synthetic setae is not a trivial material design task.

== Skin ==
Gecko skin does not generally bear scales, but appears at a macro scale as a papillose surface, which is made from hair-like protuberances developed across the entire body. These confer superhydrophobicity, and the unique design of the hair confers a profound antimicrobial action. These protuberances are very small, up to 4 microns in length, and tapering to a point. Gecko skin has been observed to have an anti-bacterial property, killing gram-negative bacteria when they come in contact with the skin.

The mossy leaf-tailed gecko of Madagascar, U. sikorae, has coloration developed as camouflage, most being greyish brown to black, or greenish brown, with various markings meant to resemble tree bark; down to the lichens and moss found on the bark. It also has flaps of skin, running the length of its body, head and limbs, known as the dermal flap, which it can lay against the tree during the day, scattering shadows, and making its outline practically invisible.

== Teeth ==
As polyphyodonts, geckos can replace each of their 100 teeth every 3 to 4 months. Next to the full grown tooth there is a small replacement tooth developing from the odontogenic stem cell in the dental lamina. Unlike most other squamates, the palatal teeth on the roof of the mouth have been completely lost. The formation of the teeth is pleurodont; they are fused (ankylosed) by their sides to the inner surface of the jaw bones. This formation is common in all species in the order Squamata.

== Taxonomy and classification ==
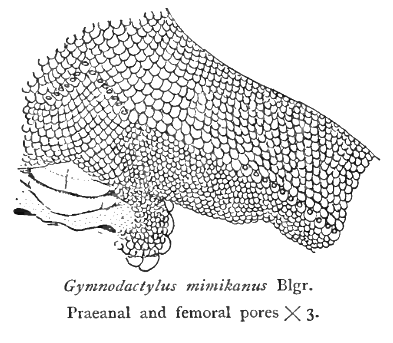
Pores on the skin are often used in classification.

The suborder Gekkota is divided into seven families, containing about 125 genera of geckos, including the snake-like (legless) pygopods.

- Family Carphodactylidae
- Family Diplodactylidae
- Family Eublepharidae
- Family Gekkonidae
- Family Phyllodactylidae
- Family Pygopodidae
- Family Sphaerodactylidae

Legless lizards of the family Dibamidae, also referred to as blind lizards, have occasionally been counted as gekkotans, but recent molecular phylogenies suggest otherwise.

- Gekkota
  - - Diplodactylidae
    - - Carphodactylidae
      - Pygopodidae
  - - Eublepharidae
    - - Sphaerodactylidae
      - - Phyllodactylidae
        - Gekkonidae

=== Evolutionary history ===
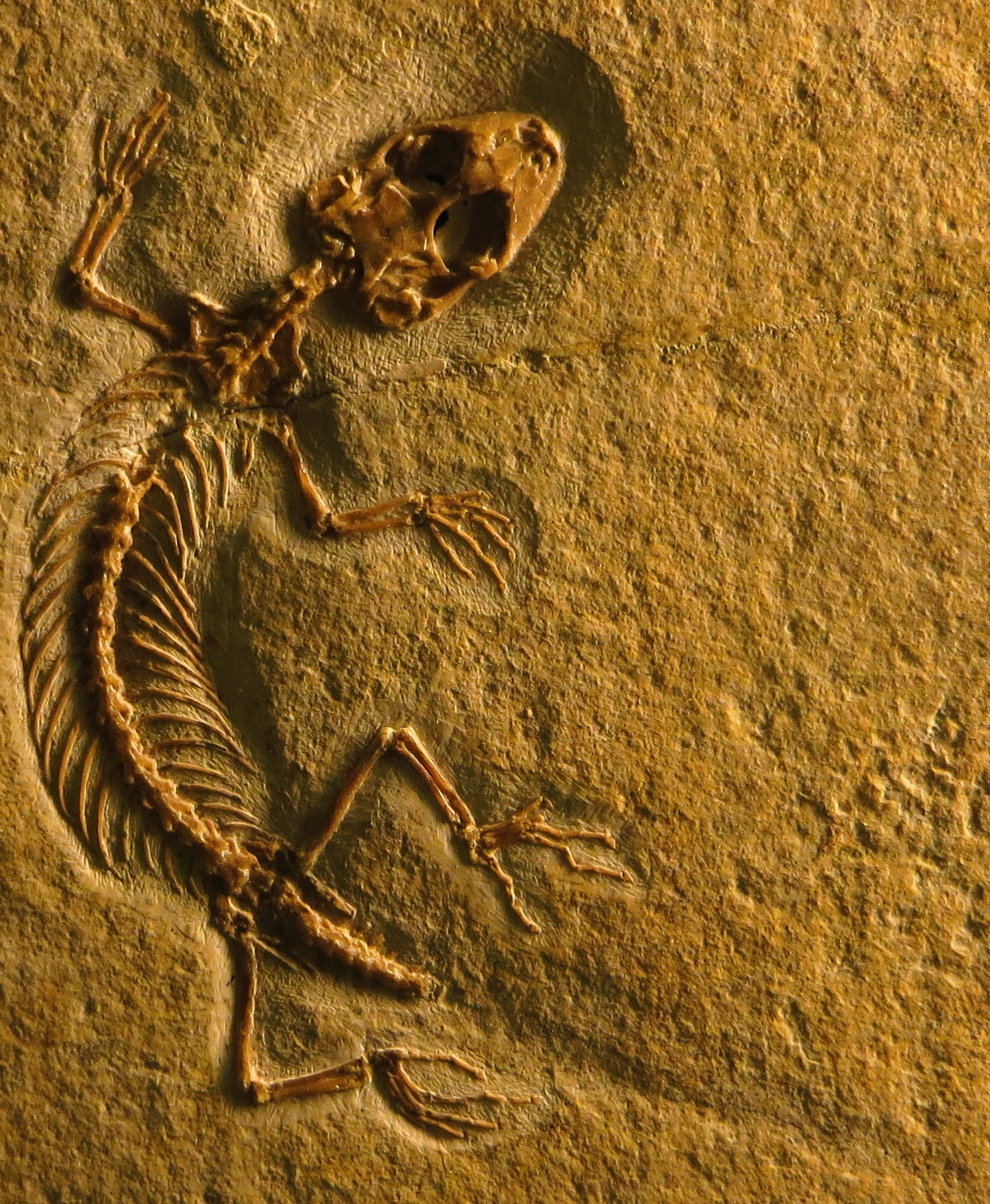
Skeleton of Eichstaettisaurus, thought to be an early member of the gecko lineage

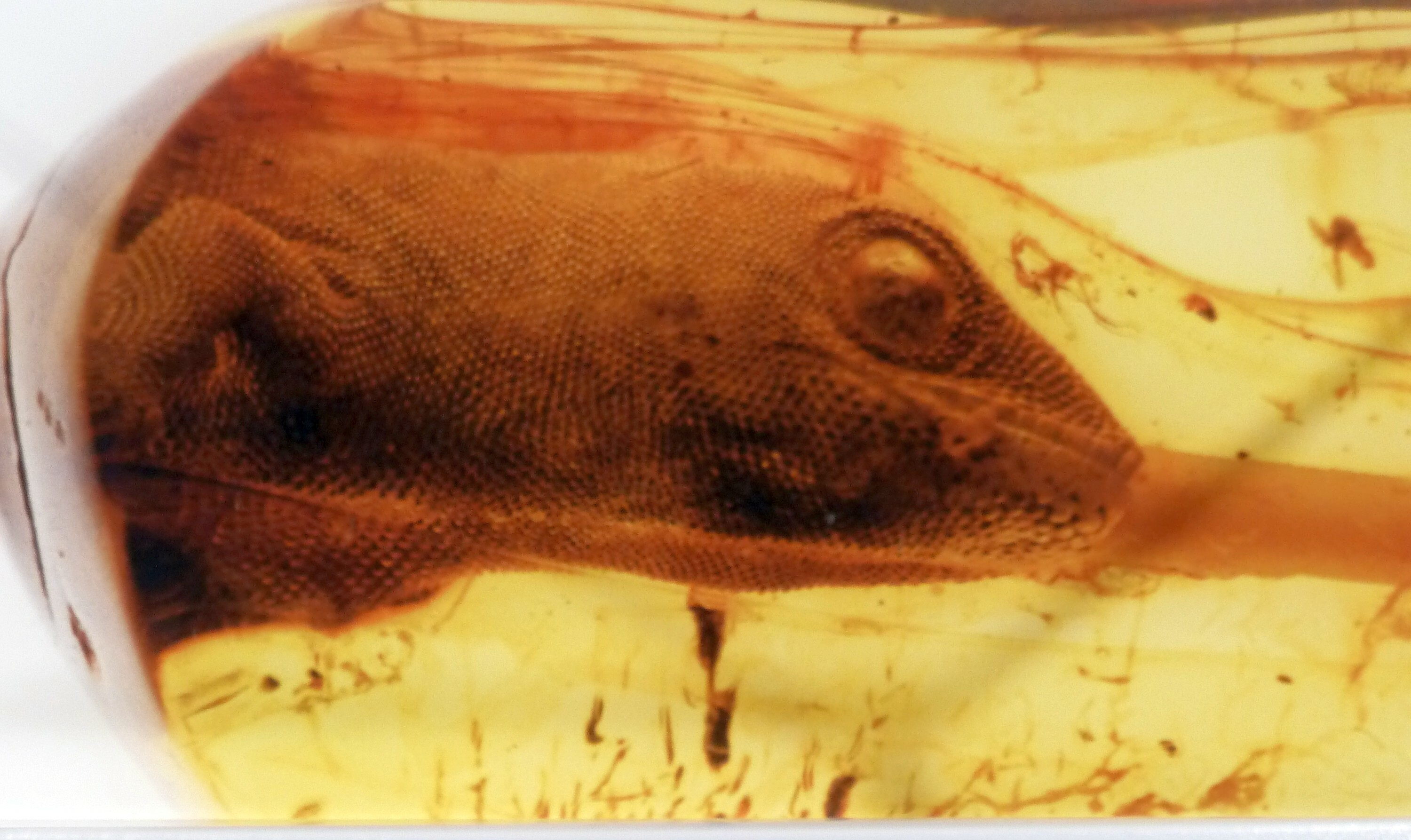
Fossil of Yantarogekko preserved in Baltic amber

Several species of lizard from the late Jurassic have been considered early relatives of geckos, the most prominent and most well supported being the arboreal Eichstaettisaurus from the late Jurassic of Germany. Norellius from the early Cretaceous of Mongolia is also usually placed as a close relative of geckos. The oldest known fossils of modern geckos are from the mid-Cretaceous Burmese amber of Myanmar (including Cretaceogekko), around 100 million years old, which have adhesive pads on the feet similar to those of living geckos.

== Species ==
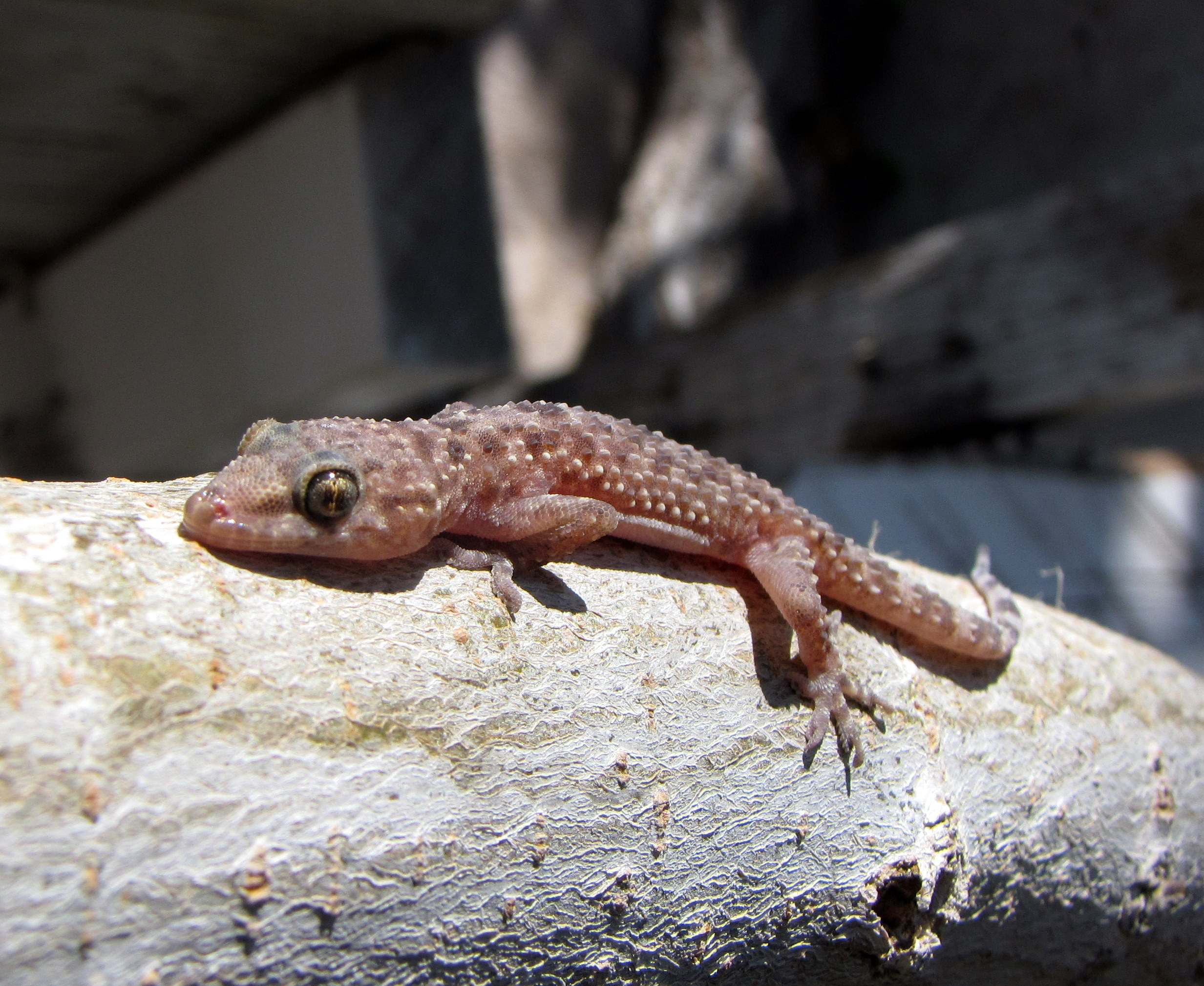
Mediterranean house gecko

More than 1,850 species of geckos occur worldwide, including these familiar species:

- Coleonyx variegatus, the western banded gecko, is native to the southwestern United States and northwest Mexico.
- Cyrtopodion brachykolon, the bent-toed gecko, is found in northwestern Pakistan; it was first described in 2007.
- Eublepharis macularius, the leopard gecko, is the most common gecko kept as a pet; it does not have adhesive toe pads and cannot climb the glass of a vivarium.
- Gehyra mutilata (Pteropus mutilatus), the stump-toed gecko, is able to vary its color from very light to very dark to camouflage itself; this gecko is at home in the wild, as well as in residential areas.
- Gekko gecko, the Tokay gecko, is a large, common, Southeast Asian gecko known for its aggressive temperament, loud mating calls, and bright markings.
- Hemidactylus is genus of geckos with many varieties.
  - Hemidactylus frenatus, the common house gecko, thrives around people and human habitation structures in the tropics and subtropics worldwide.
  - Hemidactylus garnotii, the Indo-Pacific gecko, is found in houses throughout the tropics, and has become an invasive species of concern in Florida and Georgia in the US.
  - Hemidactylus mabouia, the tropical house gecko, Afro-American house gecko, or cosmopolitan house gecko, is a species of house gecko native to sub-Saharan Africa and also currently found in North, Central, and South America and the Caribbean.
  - Hemidactylus turcicus, the Mediterranean house gecko, is frequently found in and around buildings, and is an introduced species in the US.
- Lepidodactylus lugubris, the mourning gecko, is originally an East Asian and Pacific species; it is equally at home in the wild and residential neighborhoods.
- Pachydactylus bibroni, Bibron's gecko, is native to southern Africa; this hardy arboreal gecko is considered a household pest.
- Phelsuma laticauda, the gold dust day gecko, is diurnal; it lives in northern Madagascar and on the Comoros. It is also an introduced species in Hawaii.
- Ptychozoon is a genus of arboreal geckos from Southeast Asia also known as flying or parachute geckos; they have wing-like flaps from the neck to the upper leg to help them conceal themselves on trees and provide lift while jumping.
- Rhacodactylus is a genus native to New Caledonia.
  - Rhacodactylus ciliatus (now assigned to the genus Correlophus), the crested gecko, was believed extinct until rediscovered in 1994, and is gaining popularity as a pet.
  - Rhacodactylus leachianus, the New Caledonian giant gecko, was first described by Cuvier in 1829; it is the largest living species of gecko.
- Sphaerodactylus ariasae, the dwarf gecko, is native to the Caribbean Islands; it is the world's smallest lizard.
- Tarentola mauritanica, the crocodile or Moorish gecko, is commonly found in the Mediterranean region from the Iberian Peninsula and southern France to Greece and northern Africa; their most distinguishing characteristics are their pointed heads, spiked skin, and tails resembling those of a crocodile.

== Reproduction ==
Most geckos lay a small clutch of eggs. Some are live-bearing, and a few can reproduce asexually via parthenogenesis. Geckos also have a large diversity of sex-determining mechanisms, including temperature-dependent sex determination and both XX/XY and ZZ/ZW sex chromosomes with multiple transitions among them over evolutionary time. Madagascar day geckos engage in a mating ritual in which sexually mature males produce a waxy substance from pores on the back of their legs. Males approach females with a head swaying motion along with rapid tongue flicking in the female. Clutch size in most geckos is small and fixed, with females producing one or two eggs per clutch. Some species alternate between single-egg and two-egg clutches, while other species lay single-egg clutches exclusively.

Eggshell structure also varies across gecko lineages. Most squamate reptiles lay parchment-shelled eggs that absorb water from the environment during incubation. However, a single lineage of gekkotans (including the families Gekkonidae, Phyllodactylidae, and Sphaerodactylidae) lays rigid-shelled eggs. These hard eggs contain all necessary water at the time of laying and lose water slowly through vapor diffusion. As a result, their shell permeability is much lower than that of soft-shelled reptile eggs and is similar to that of bird eggs.

Geckos native to New Zealand, such as Hoplodactylus maculatus and H. duvaucelii, give birth to live young (viviparity) and reproduce less often than once per year in some populations. In the Macraes-Middlemarch region of Central Otago, female H. maculatus average about 0.85 offspring per year because they breed every two years and often produce clutches smaller than two. This low birth rate is linked to cool summer temperatures combined with live-bearing reproduction.

Obligate parthenogenesis as a reproductive system has evolved multiple times in the family Gekkonidae. It has been shown that oocytes are able to undergo meiosis in three different obligate parthenogenetic complexes of geckos. An extra premeiotic endoreplication of chromosomes is essential for obligate parthenogenesis in these geckos. Appropriate segregation during meiosis to form viable progeny is facilitated by the formation of bivalents made from copies of identical chromosomes.

== Mythology ==
According to Greek mythology, in her anger Demeter splashed what remained of her drink onto the young Ascalabus, transforming him completely into a multicolored gecko (in ancient Greek ἀσκάλαβος; ascalabus).
