= Jean-Marc Zulesi =

French politician

Jean-Marc Zulesi MP
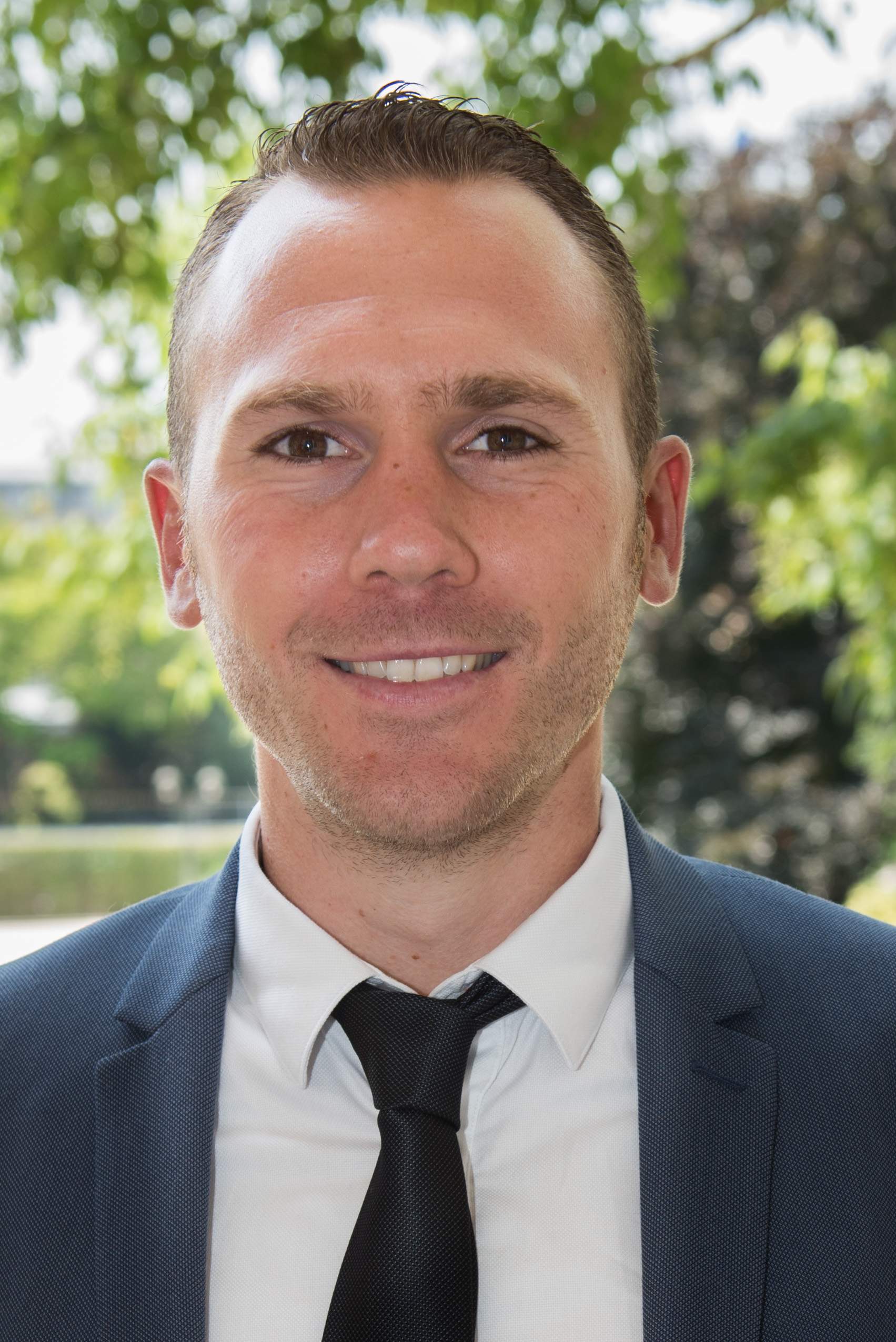

Member of the National Assembly for Bouches-du-Rhône's 8th constituency
- In office 21 June 2017 – 18 July 2024
- Preceded by: Jean-Pierre Maggi
- Succeeded by: Romain Tonussi

Personal details
- Born: Jean-Marc Zulesi; 6 June 1988 (age 38) Marseille
- Party: Renaissance; Territories of Progress
- Education: ENSI Sud-Alsace; EM Strasbourg
- Occupation: Politician
- Website: jeanmarczulesi.fr

Jean-Marc Zulesi (born 6 June 1988 in Marseille) is a French politician.

Project Manager at Mirion Technologies, he is elected as deputy for Renaissance (RE) of Bouches-du-Rhône in June 2017. He is also president of the "Collectif pour l'Avenir de notre Territoire" (Collective for Future of our Territory).

== Biography ==
=== Family ===
Jean-Marc Zulesi was born on 6 June 1988 in Marseille. His father is commercial director and his mother retired from the SNCF. He spent his childhood in Cornillon-Confoux, a small Provençal village in the Bouches-du-Rhône.

=== Education ===
After completing a part of his schooling in Marseille, he continued his secondary studies at Salon de Provence, before joining a preparatory class to the great school in Avignon. In 2012, he obtained an engineering degree from ENSISA in Mulhouse while following a double course enabling him to obtain a master's degree in business administration at the EM Strasbourg Business School.

=== Professional career ===
Jean-Marc Zulesi began his career at Assystem, specialized in engineering and innovation consulting. In October 2014, he joined as project manager the society Mirion Technologies, specializing in radiation protection devices based in Lamanon. However, following his election in June 2017, he decides to bracket his professional career to devote himself fully to his function as a member of Parliament.

=== Associative engagement ===
Jean-Marc Zulesi was the president of the "Collectif pour l'Avenir de notre Territoire" (Collective for Future of our Territory), an association aimed at energizing the territory of the Pays salonais and promoting its assets. He created this collective in collaboration with other young people of his territory on a clear fact that the new generations were too often removed from the civic life and that too few events were organized to allow them a real social, economic and cultural integration in the life society.

Besides his civic commitments, he is also a sportsman, as he participates in many races like Marseille-Cassis, trails or marathons.

== Political itinerary ==
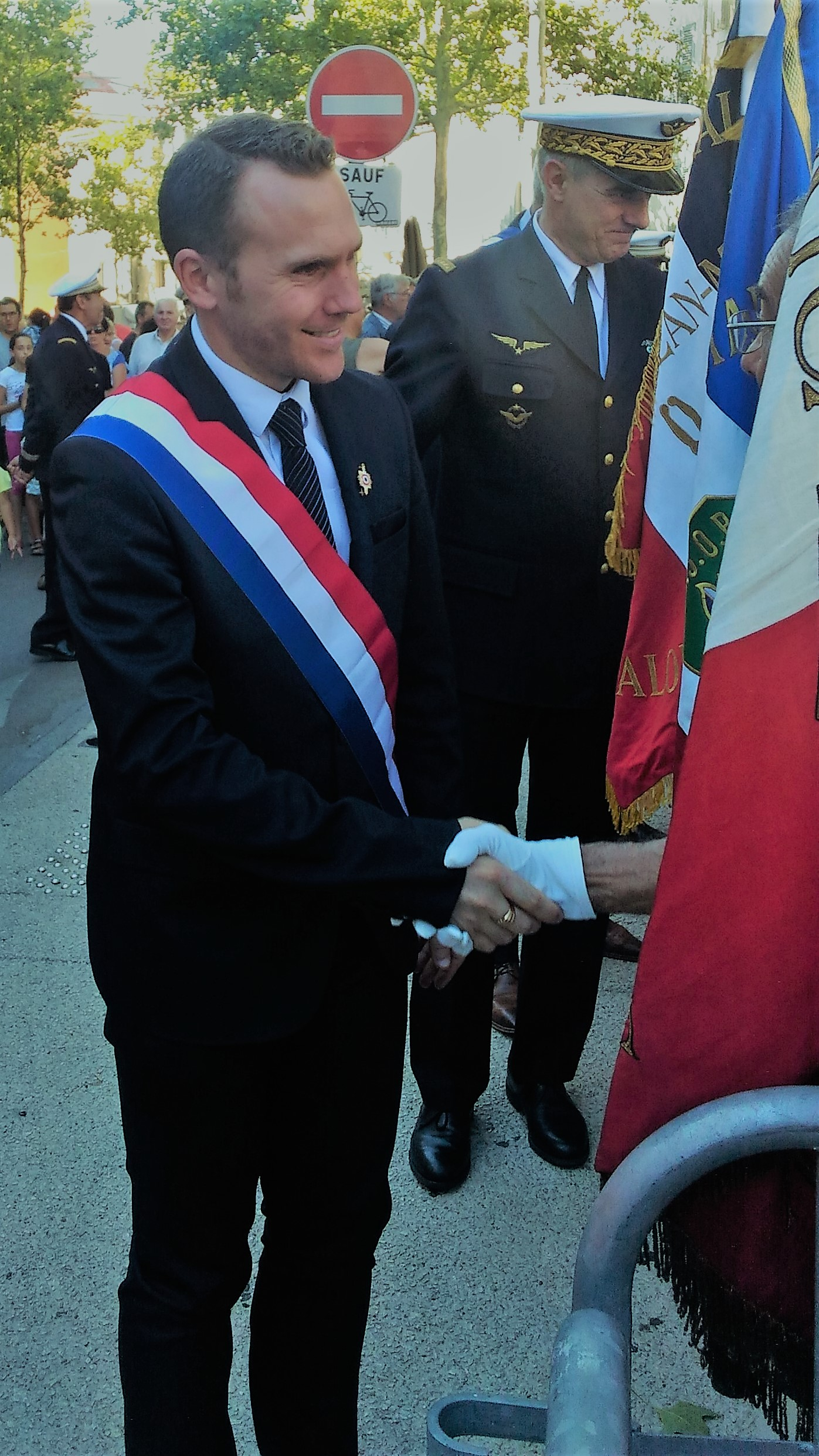
Jean-Marc Zulesi, greeting veterans.

=== His first commitment ===
The first time that Jean-Marc Zulesi is involved in politics is to follow the campaign of Olivier Ferrand, then invested by the Socialist Party in his constituency. But the traditional parties did not inspire him much anymore: "I was not really interested in the Socialist party, but more for the man in himself, who embodied renewal and a desire to change things."

=== His commitment "En Marche" ===
In April 2015, "Young People With Macron" are created ("JAM" in French). He decided to become part of it and quickly became the referent in the Bouches-du-Rhône of the collective. He took part in setting up the movement locally and found himself at the head of the second most important local committee of the department, "En Marche Pays Salonais".

Invested in the Bouches-du-Rhône's 8th constituency for La République en marche ! in May 2017, he was elected with 58.68% of the votes in the second round of the 2017 legislative elections.

== Parliamentary balance sheet and political action ==
=== Rapporteur of law ===
Jean-Marc Zulesi, who has only been a member of the House for a few weeks, is appointed to be the rapporteur of the law ratifying the orders concerning the modification of the environmental assessment rules and the reform of the procedures to ensure Information and public participation in the development of certain decisions likely to affect the environment.

On 18 July 2017, he presented the text to all members of the National Assembly on behalf of the Committee on Sustainable Development and Regional Planning.

=== Commitments for the 8th constituency ===
In his first weeks as a deputy, Jean-Marc Zulesi enters the heart of two of his campaign priorities, the rehabilitation of the Etang de Berre and the problems of transport.

For the first subject, he had the opportunity to discuss with Nicolas Hulot, who supported this project 10 years ago, and whose challenge now is to reconcile national expertise with reality on the ground. For the second, he exchanged views with the Secretary of State, Sébastien Lecornu, and addressed the issue raised by the Talagard half-interchanges and discussed the Coudoux half-interchange project, to relieve the secondary roads in the constituency.

== Detail of functions and mandates ==
- Since 21 June 2017: Member of the National Assembly for Bouches-du-Rhône's 8th constituency

== Learn More ==
=== Related articles ===
- Bouches-du-Rhône's 8th constituency
- Deputies of the 15th National Assembly

=== External links ===
- His web page on the National Assembly
