= Le Coulet =

Hamlet in Bouches-du-Rhône, France

Coordinates: 43°49′05″N 3°32′10″E

Le Coulet (Occitan: Lo Coulet) is a hamlet in the commune of La Fare-les-Oliviers in the Bouches-du-Rhône department in southern France. It is situated in the Provence-Alpes-Côte d'Azur region and the nearest major train station is in Salon-de-Provence.

== Geography ==
Le Coulet is located to the north of the village center of La Fare-les-Oliviers.

== See also ==
- Communes of the Bouches-du-Rhône department
