= Didier Parakian =

French businessman and politician (born 1964)

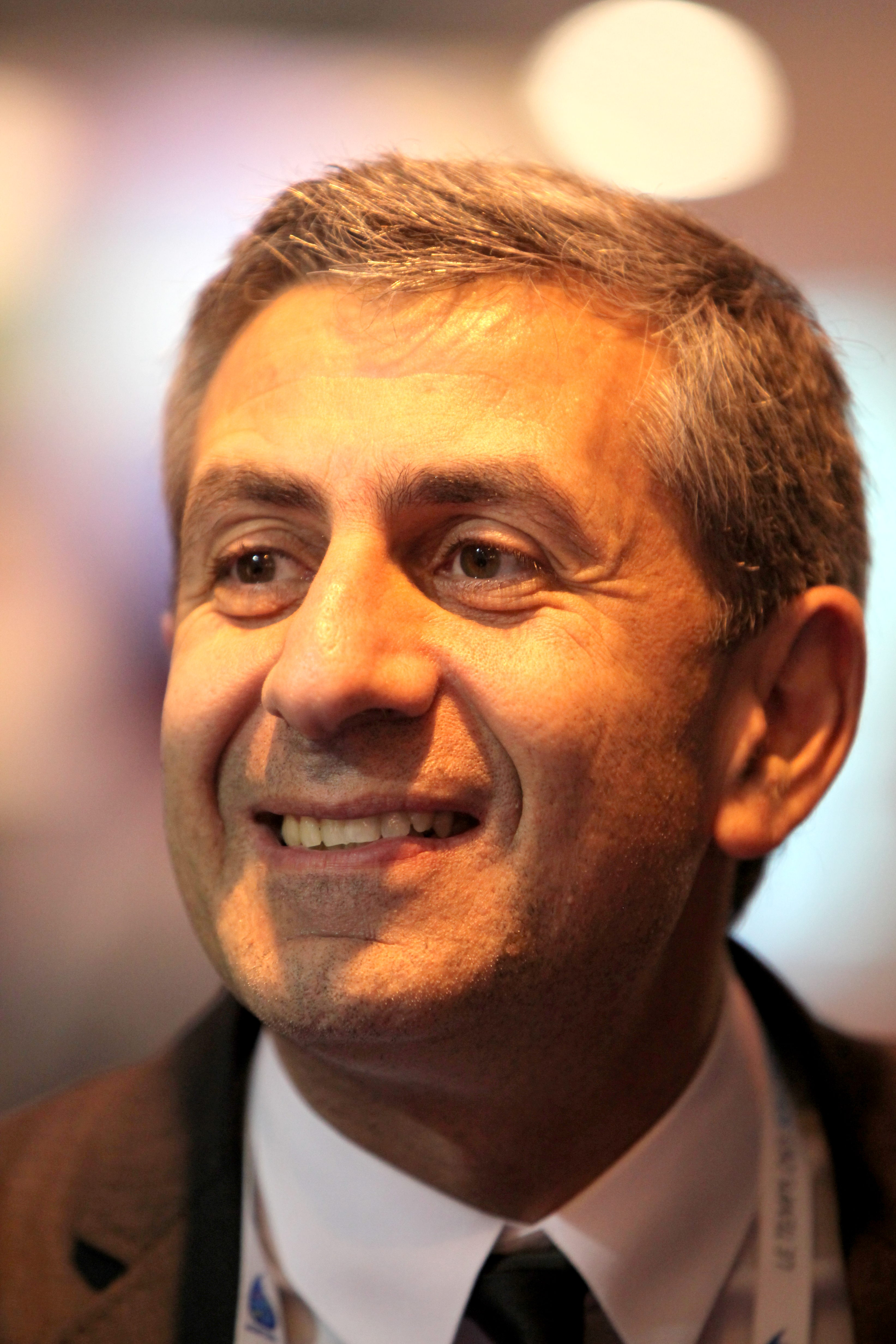
- Parakian in 2012

Member of the National Assembly for Bouches-du-Rhône's 1st constituency
- In office 20 August 2023 – 9 June 2024
- Preceded by: Sabrina Agresti-Roubache
- Succeeded by: Monique Griseti

Personal details
- Born: 5 March 1964 (age 62) Marseille, France
- Party: Renaissance (2023–present)
- Other political affiliations: Miscellaneous right (until 2023)
- Occupation: Businessman

Didier Parakian (French pronunciation: [didje paʁakjɑ̃]; born 5 March 1964) is a French businessman and politician who represented the 1st constituency of the Bouches-du-Rhône department in the National Assembly from 2023 to 2024. He is a member of Renaissance (RE).

Parakian made his fortune from ready-to-wear clothing. He has been a municipal councillor of Marseille since 2008 and was a deputy mayor from 2008 to 2020 under Mayor Jean-Claude Gaudin. In 2023, he took Sabrina Agresti-Roubache's seat in Parliament as her substitute, following her appointment to the government.

== Biography ==
Parakian was born in Marseille. His Armenian grandparents migrated to France in 1920 from the Turkish cities of Bursa and Kütahya.

Parakian set up an eponymous fashion brand with his sister Marjorie. He sold the majority of the shares to the Thomas family in 2015. The following year, an unsuccessful attempt at becoming more upmarket led to the company going into receivership. In March 2017, the company was rescued by Chinese corporation Zhejiang Dunnu.

In 2008, Parakian was elected to the city council. He became a deputy to right-wing mayor Jean-Claude Gaudin.

In July 2020, Parakian was appointed to the council of the Aix-Marseille-Provence Metropolis and named in the executive led by Martine Vassal. He was put in charge of European funds.

Formerly a member of The Republicans (LR), Parakian ran for Emmanuel Macron's Renaissance in the 2022 French legislative election, as the substitute for Sabrina Agresti-Roubache's candidacy in Bouches-du-Rhône's 1st constituency. In July 2023, Agresti-Roubache was nominated for a ministerial post, and Parakian succeeded her as a deputy in the National Assembly. Agresti-Roubache ran for Renaissance in the 2024 French legislative election.
