= Sabrina Agresti-Roubache =

French film producer and politician of Renaissance (born 1976)

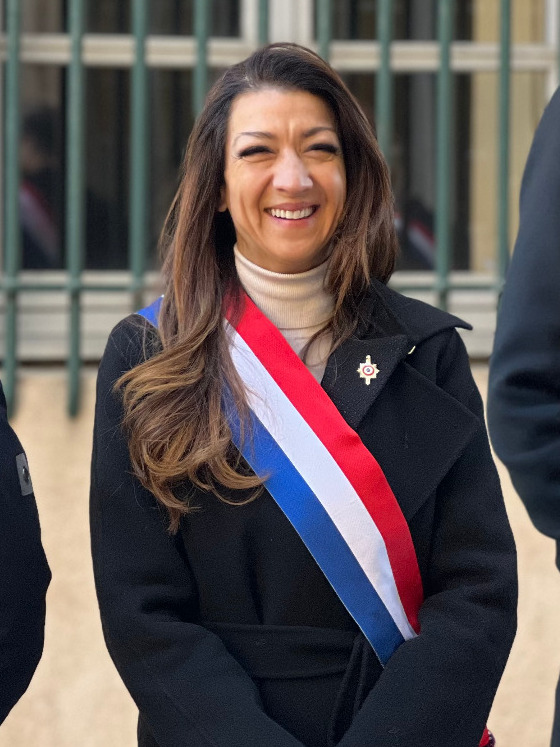

Secretary for Citizenship and Urban Development
- In office 20 July 2023 – 21 September 2024
- President: Emmanuel Macron
- Prime Minister: Élisabeth Borne; Gabriel Attal
- Preceded by: Olivier Klein (Urban Development); Sonia Backès (Citizenship)
- Succeeded by: Valérie Létard (Urban Development); Othman Nasrou (Citizenship)

Member of the National Assembly for Bouches-du-Rhône's 1st constituency
- In office 22 June 2022 – 20 August 2023
- Preceded by: Julien Ravier
- Succeeded by: Didier Parakian

Member of the Regional Council of Provence-Alpes-Côte d'Azur
- Incumbent
- Assumed office 2 July 2021
- President: Renaud Muselier

Personal details
- Born: Sabrina Roubache; 13 October 1976 (age 49) Marseille, France
- Party: Renaissance
- Spouse: Jean-Philippe Agresti (m. 2021)

Sabrina Agresti-Roubache (née Roubache; born 13 October 1976) is a French film producer and politician of Renaissance (RE) who served as Secretary of Citizenship and Urban Development in the government of successive Prime Ministers Élisabeth Borne and Gabriel Attal from 2023 to 2024. She previously was a member of the National Assembly from 2022 to 2023, representing Bouches-du-Rhône's 1st constituency.

== Early life ==
Born into a family of Algerian immigrants as the third of six siblings, Agresti-Roubache grew up in Provence. She spent her early years in the Félix-Pyat housing project, which has since become one of the most precarious in Marseille.

Agresti-Roubache holds a bachelor's degree in literature. She left law school to work with French hip hop band IAM and then with the footballer Eric Cantona. In 2016, she became one of the producers of the Netflix series Marseille.

She played handball for 17 years. First in the team of CJF Fleury-les-Aubrais (Loiret), then as a professional player in D1 and D2, in the clubs of Toulon Saint-Cyr Var and OGC Nice (Alpes-Maritimes); she plays the position of center-half, and is often the captain of the team. In 2017, she plays in the amateur club N2 of Moncoutant (Deux-Sèvres).

== Political career ==
In parliament, Agresti-Roubache served on the Committee on Legal Affairs from 2022 to 2023. She also served as spokesperson of her parliamentary group, under the leadership of its chair Aurore Bergé.

In July 2023, Agresti-Roubache became State Secretary for Urban Development in the Borne government.

On 10 October 2023 she gained the Citizenship portfolio, replacing Sonia Backès who resigned after her defeat in the 2023 Senate Elections.

She ran for reelection as a member of the National Assembly in the 2024 snap election. Despite qualifying for the second round, she withdrew her candidacy in an unsuccessful effort to help her left-wing rival to defeat the National Rally candidate, Monique Griseti.

== Personal life ==
Agresti-Roubache and Jean-Philippe Agresti have been married since 2021.

== See also ==
- List of deputies of the 16th National Assembly of France
