= Robert Schuman University =

Coordinates: 48.5790°N 7.7676°E

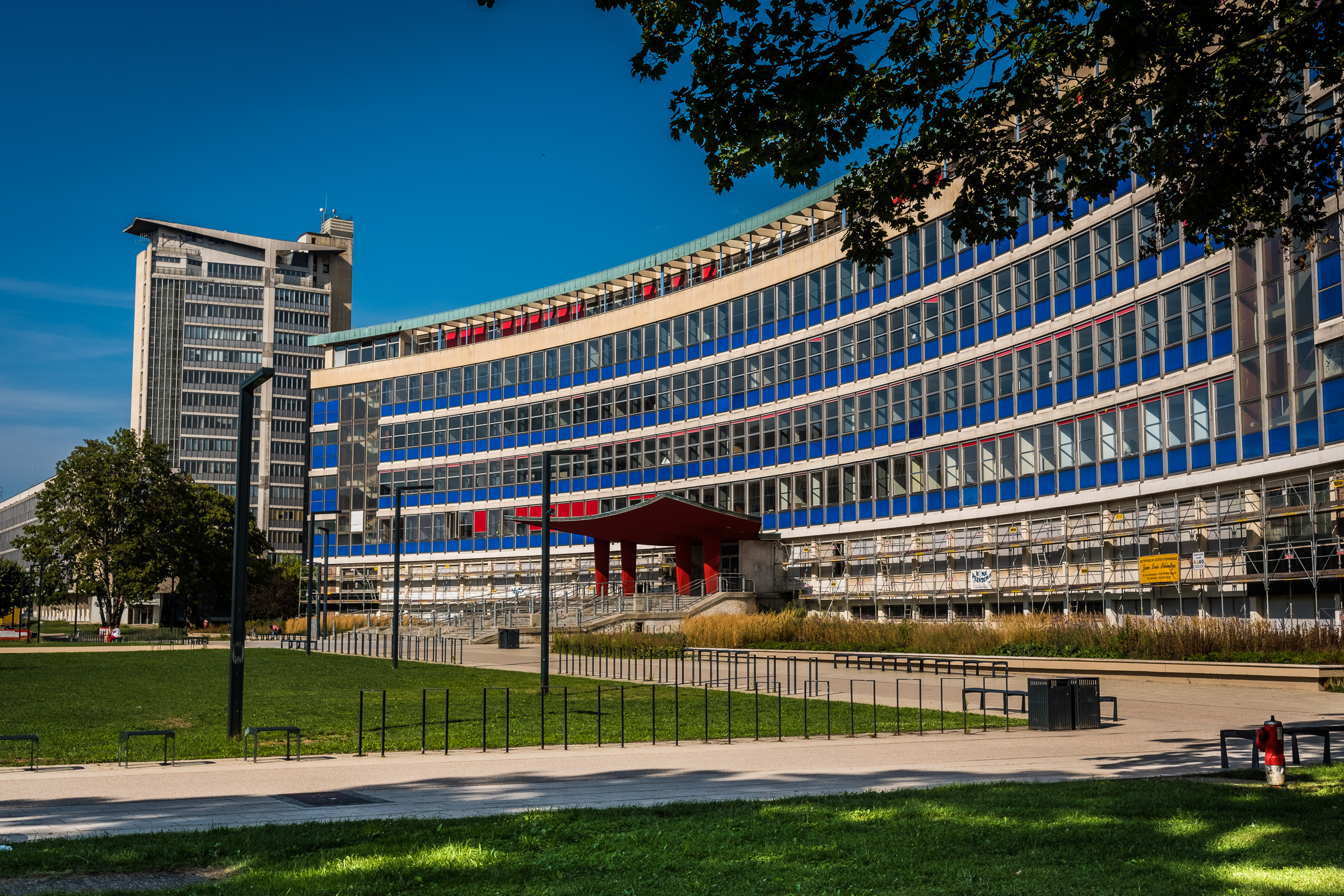
The broad facade of the main building of the Law faculty

The Robert Schuman University (French: Université Robert Schuman), also known as Strasbourg III or URS, was a university in Strasbourg, Alsace, France. In 2007, there were nearly 10,000 students enrolled at the university, including more than 1,500 foreign students. The university tended to teach and research in fields such as law, politics and international relations. This university also included three grande écoles, the Institut d'études politiques de Strasbourg, the Institut Européen d'Etudes Commerciales Supérieures de Strasbourg (IECS), and the Centre Universitaire d'Enseignement du Journalisme (CUEJ). The Université Robert Schuman was named after the politician Robert Schuman, not to be confused with composer Robert Schumann.

On 1 January 2009, Robert Schuman University became part of the refounded University of Strasbourg and lost its status as an independent university.

== See also ==
- Centre for International Industrial Property Studies (CEIPI)
- Institut Européen d'Etudes Commerciales Supérieures de Strasbourg (IECS)
- Institut d'études politiques de Strasbourg (IEP)
- University of Strasbourg
- Robert Schuman Institute
