= Bouches-du-Rhône's 8th constituency =

Constituency of the National Assembly of France

8th constituency of Bouches-du-Rhône
- inline Constituency of the National Assembly of France

- Constituency in Bouches-du-Rhône Department (white area is the Étang de Berre lagoon)

- Bouches-du-Rhône in France
- Deputy: Romain Tonussi; RN
- Department: Bouches-du-Rhône

The 8th constituency of Bouches-du-Rhône is a French legislative constituency in Bouches-du-Rhône.

== Deputies ==
Election	Member	Party
1981	Marius Masse	PS
1986	Proportional Representation by Department	
1988	Marius Masse	PS
1993	Marius Masse	PS
1997	Marius Masse	PS
2002	Christophe Masse	PS
2007	Valérie Boyer	UMP
2012	Olivier Ferrand	PS
2012	Jean-Pierre Maggi	PS
2017	Jean-Marc Zulesi	LREM
2022	Jean-Marc Zulesi	RE
2024	Romain Tonussi	RN

== Elections ==
=== 2024 ===
Candidate	Party	Alliance	First round			Second round		
Candidate	Party	Alliance	Votes	%	+/–	Votes	%	+/–
Romain Tonussi	RN		30,987	44.63	+19.30	34,269	50.24	+3.41
Jean-Marc Zulesi	RE	Ensemble	18,563	26.73	-1.05	33,940	49.76	-3.41
Alexandre Beddock	LFI	NFP	13,938	20.07	+0.66	withdrew		
Stéphanie Volpini	LR	UDC	3,105	4.47	-10.46			
Céline Fanfan	EAC		1,882	2.71	new			
Jeanne Vigier	REC		617	0.89	-4.68			
Rémy Bazzali	LO		342	0.49	-0.25			
Votes			69,434	100.00		68,209	100.00	
Valid votes			69,434	98.01	-0.37	68,209	96.07	+2.85
Blank votes			897	1.27	+0.10	2,049	2.89	-2.24
Null votes			516	0.73	+0.28	743	1.05	-0.60
Turnout			70,847	68.33	+21.49	71,001	68.47	+23.70
Abstentions			32,836	31.67	-21.49	32,694	31.53	-23.70
Registered voters			103,683			103,695		
Result			RN GAIN FROM RE					

=== 2022 ===
Legislative Election 2022: Bouches-du-Rhône's 8th constituency
Party	Candidate	Votes	%	±%
LREM (Ensemble)	Jean-Marc Zulesi	13,166	27.78	-6.46
RN	Romain Tonussi	12,004	25.33	+1.48
LFI (NUPÉS)	Eric Deligny	9,197	19.41	+1.56
LR (UDC)	David Ytier	7,074	14.93	−0.33
REC	Jean-Michel Farge	2,638	5.57	N/A
DVE	Daniel Mehl	1,254	2.65	N/A
Others	N/A	2,061		
Turnout		48,172	46.84	−0.42
2nd round result
LREM (Ensemble)	Jean-Marc Zulesi	22,823	53.17	-5.51
RN	Romain Tonussi	20,104	46.83	+5.51
Turnout		42,927	44.77	+2.96
LREM hold				

=== 2017 ===
Candidate	Label	First round		Second round	
Candidate	Label	Votes	%	Votes	%
Jean-Marc Zulesi	REM	15,850	34.24	22,448	58.68
Antoine Baudino	FN	11,041	23.85	15,807	41.32
Sandra Dalbin	LR	7,062	15.26		
Nadia Graindorge	FI	5,103	11.02		
Clément Acar	PS	1,202	2.60		
Mathieu Saintagne	ECO	1,029	2.22		
Christiane Pujol	DLF	997	2.15		
Michel Frate	PCF	931	2.01		
Michel Cantinol	ECO	672	1.45		
Khaled Beghouach	DVG	553	1.19		
Ange Tinelli	DIV	365	0.79		
Christian Péri	DIV	326	0.70		
Véronique Assiouras	PRG	324	0.70		
Geneviève Monténéro	DIV	248	0.54		
Jérôme Ravenet	ECO	221	0.48		
Rémy Bazzali	EXG	204	0.44		
Jean-Marie Mure-Ravaud	DVD	158	0.34		
Votes		46,286	100.00	38,255	100.00
Valid votes		46,286	97.84	38,255	91.41
Blank votes		729	1.54	2,623	6.27
Null votes		291	0.62	971	2.32
Turnout		47,306	47.26	41,849	41.81
Abstentions		52,788	52.74	58,243	58.19
Registered voters		100,094		100,092	
Source: Ministry of the Interior

=== 2012 ===
Summary of the 10 June and 17 June 2012 French legislative election in Bouches-du-Rhône’s 8th Constituency
Candidate	Party		1st round		2nd round	
Candidate	Party		Votes	%	Votes	%
Olivier Ferrand	Socialist Party	PS	17,034	31.55%	22,331	40.48%
Nicolas Isnard	Union for a Popular Movement	UMP	17,601	32.60%	22,013	39.91%
Gérald Gerin	Front National	FN	11,863	21.97%	10,816	19.61%
Hélène Le Cacheux	Left Front	FG	3,112	5.76%		
Claude Cortesi		CEN	1,439	2.67%		
Jean-Yves Pied	Far Right	EXD	609	1.13%		
Rosa Alba Silvestri	Radical Party of the Left	PRG	581	1.08%		
Jean Frizzi	Ecologist	ECO	495	0.92%		
Jean-François Dorbeaux	Miscellaneous Right	DVD	322	0.60%		
Hakim Hallalen	Centrist Alliance	ALLI	259	0.48%		
José-Ramon Guardia	Far Right	EXD	225	0.42%		
Denis Vial	Other	AUT	200	0.37%		
Antonia Luciani Garcia	Regionalist	REG	133	0.25%		
Frédéric Kechra	Far Left	EXG	123	0.23%		
Total			53,996	100%	55,160	100%
Registered voters			93,086		93,083	
Blank/Void ballots			695	1.27%	834	1.49%
Turnout			54,691	58.75%	55,994	60.15%
Abstentions			38,395	41.25%	37,089	39.85%
Result					PS GAIN	

=== 2007 ===
Summary of the 10 June and 17 June 2007 French legislative election in Bouches-du-Rhône’s 8th Constituency
Candidate	Party		1st round		2nd round	
Candidate	Party		Votes	%	Votes	%
Valérie Boyer	Union for a Popular Movement	UMP	17,077	41.16%	20,872	50.24%
Christophe Masse	Socialist Party	PS	13,795	33.25%	20,676	49.76%
Stéphane Durbec	Front National	FN	3,341	8.05%		
Sonia Arzano	Democratic Movement	MoDem	2,139	5.16%		
Michèle Ledesma	Communist	PCF	1,470	3.54%		
Jean-Marie Battini	Far Left	EXG	925	2.23%		
Bruno Cocaign	The Greens	VEC	492	1.19%		
Francis Belotti	Movement for France	MPF	488	1.18%		
Denise Picq	Ecologist	ECO	428	1.03%		
Olga Dhamelincourt Pibarot	Miscellaneous Right	DVD	269	0.65%		
Françoise Latour	Ecologist	ECO	249	0.60%		
Gérard Fleury	Far Right	EXD	245	0.59%		
Patrick Grenier	Far Left	EXG	228	0.55%		
Abel Djerari	Independent	DIV	215	0.52%		
Elisabeth Harmitt	Independent	DIV	127	0.31%		
Emmanuelle Barreyre	Independent	DIV	0	0.00%		
Total			41,488	100%	41,548	100%
Registered voters			74,134		74,123	
Blank/Void ballots			560	1.33%	893	2.10%
Turnout			42,048	56.72%	42,441	57.26%
Abstentions			32,086	43.28%	31,682	42.74%
Result					UMP GAIN	

=== 2002 ===
Legislative Election 2002: Bouches-du-Rhône's 8th constituency
Party	Candidate	Votes	%	±%
PS	Christophe Masse	13,996	35.66	
UDF	Jacques Rocca Serra	10,521	26.81	
FN	Stephane Durbec	8,276	21.09	
DVD	Alain Persia	1,470	3.75	
MNR	Yvon Claire	1,209	2.08	
Others	N/A	3,771		
Turnout		39,934	62.06	
2nd round result
PS	Christophe Masse	16,241	44.56	
UDF	Jacques Rocca Serra	13,426	36.84	
FN	Stephane Durbec	6,777	18.60	
Turnout		37,095	57.65	
PS hold				

=== 1997 ===
Legislative Election 1997: Bouches-du-Rhône's 8th constituency
Party	Candidate	Votes	%	±%
PS	Marius Masse	10,455	28.88	
FN	Yvon Claire	10,199	28.18	
RPR	Maurice Talazac	7,456	20.60	
PCF	Rudy Vigier	4,829	13.34	
LO	Claudine Rodinson	918	2.54	
Others	N/A	2,341		
Turnout		37,377	61.93	
2nd round result
PS	Marius Masse	21,968	59.06	
FN	Yvon Claire	15,225	40.94	
Turnout		40,454	67.03	
PS hold				
