= Bouches-du-Rhône's 1st constituency =

Constituency of the National Assembly of France

1st constituency of Bouches-du-Rhône
- inline Constituency of the National Assembly of France

- Constituency in Bouches-du-Rhône Department (white area is the Étang de Berre lagoon)

- Bouches-du-Rhône in France
- Deputy: Monique Griseti; RN
- Department: Bouches-du-Rhône

The 1st constituency of Bouches-du-Rhône is a French legislative constituency in Bouches-du-Rhône.

== Deputies ==
Election	Member	Party
2007	Roland Blum	UMP
2012	Valérie Boyer	UMP
2017	Valérie Boyer	LR
2020	Julien Ravier	LR
2022	Sabrina Agresti-Roubache	RE
2024	Monique Griseti	RN

== Elections ==
=== 2024 ===
Candidate	Party	Alliance	First round			Second round		
Candidate	Party	Alliance	Votes	%	+/–	Votes	%	+/–
Monique Griseti	RN		24,276	45.54	+18.28	28,304	55.86	+6.65
Pascaline Lécorché	DVG	NFP	14,340	26.90	+2.67	22,367	44.14	new
Sabrina Agresti-Roubache	REN	Ensemble	12,585	23.61	-1.81	withdrew		
Salomé Moyal	REC		867	1.63	-6.73			
Céline Caravellazi	DSV		842	1.58	-0.10			
Marc Cecone	LO		402	0.75	-0.07			
Votes			53,312	100.00		50,671	100.00	
Valid votes			53,312	97.70	-0.45	50,671	93.80	+1.24
Blank votes			927	1.70	+0.25	2,688	4.98	-1.01
Null votes			327	0.60	+0.20	660	1.22	-0.23
Turnout			54,566	65.91	+24.14	54,019	65.23	+24.86
Abstentions			28,226	34.09	-24.14	28,797	34.77	-24.86
Registered voters			82,792			82,816		
Result			RN GAIN FROM RE					

=== 2022 ===
Legislative Election 2022: Bouches-du-Rhône's 1st constituency
Party	Candidate	Votes	%	±%
RN	Monique Griseti	9,103	27.26	+7.37
LREM (Ensemble)	Sabrina Agresti-Roubache	8,487	25.42	-4.01
PS (NUPÉS)	Thibaud Rosique	8,092	24.23	+6.98
REC	Sophie Grech	2,790	8.36	N/A
LR (UDC)	Sarah Boualem-Aubert	2,230	6.68	−18.00
DVE	Ferielle Chennouf	764	2.29	N/A
Others	N/A	1,926		
Turnout		34,020	41.77	−2.84
2nd round result
LREM (Ensemble)	Sabrina Agresti-Roubache	15,459	50.79	+5.89
RN	Monique Griseti	14,980	49.21	N/A
Turnout		30,439	40.37	+3.44
LREM gain from LR				

=== 2017 ===
Candidate	Label	First round		Second round	
Candidate	Label	Votes	%	Votes	%
Pascal Chamassian	REM	10,111	29.43	11,839	44.90
Valérie Boyer	LR	8,481	24.68	14,531	55.10
Franck Allisio	FN	6,834	19.89		
Bernard Borgialli	FI	4,205	12.24		
Gérard Oreggia	PS	883	2.57		
Christine Didon	PCF	839	2.44		
Anne-Marie Danièle	ECO	623	1.81		
Paul Roudier	DLF	483	1.41		
Anne Benhamou	ECO	364	1.06		
Xavier Bonnard	DIV	280	0.81		
Sherazade Omouri	DIV	185	0.54		
Arthur Ghilain	DIV	157	0.46		
Faustine Thibaud	ECO	152	0.44		
Vincent Mannone	DVG	151	0.44		
France Gamerre	PRG	146	0.42		
Laurie Bianciotto	EXD	132	0.38		
Marc Cecon	EXG	120	0.35		
Nadia Omani	DIV	103	0.30		
Alain Persia	DVD	98	0.29		
Sophie Dahan	DVG	11	0.03		
Souaad Rady	DVG	0	0.00		
Fouad Abdallah	ECO	0	0.00		
Votes		34,358	100.00	26,370	100.00
Valid votes		34,358	98.21	26,370	91.07
Blank votes		451	1.29	1,958	6.76
Null votes		175	0.50	627	2.17
Turnout		34,984	44.61	28,955	36.93
Abstentions		43,437	55.39	49,459	63.07
Registered voters		78,421		78,414	
Source: Ministry of the Interior

=== 2012 ===
Summary of the 10 June and 17 June 2012 French legislative election in Bouches-du-Rhône’s 1st Constituency
Candidate	Party		1st round		2nd round	
Candidate	Party		Votes	%	Votes	%
Valérie Boyer	Union for a Popular Movement	UMP	10,988	26.14%	19,689	50.65%
Christophe Masse	Socialist Party	PS	13,464	32.04%	19,184	49.35%
Elisabeth Philippe	National Front	FN	9,194	21.88%		
Robert Assante	Miscellaneous Right	DVD	3,051	7.26%		
Catherine Bartoli	Left Front	FG	2,423	5.77%		
Laurence Vichnievsky	The Greens	VEC	1,079	2.57%		
Mohamed Dahmani	Other	AUT	487	1.16%		
Nathalie Coullet		CEN	377	0.90%		
Véronique Gomez	Far Right	EXD	328	0.78%		
Paul Roudier	Miscellaneous Right	DVD	186	0.44%		
Eve Koulayan	Ecologist	ECO	157	0.37%		
Alain Persia	Other	AUT	130	0.31%		
Marc Cecon	Far Left	EXG	85	0.20%		
Nicole Bareau	Far Left	EXG	79	0.19%		
Sophie Hairabedian	Far Right	EXD	0	0.00%		
Total			42,028	100%	38,873	100%
Registered voters			73,892		73,877	
Blank/Void ballots			347	0.82%	1,367	3.40%
Turnout			42,375	57.35%	40,240	54.47%
Abstentions			31,517	42.65%	33,637	45.53%
Result					UMP HOLD	

=== 2007 ===
Summary of the 10 June and 17 June 2007 French legislative in Bouches-du-Rhône’s 1st Constituency election results
Candidate	Party		1st round		2nd round	
Candidate	Party		Votes	%	Votes	%
Roland Blum	Union for a Popular Movement	UMP	16,750	47.82%	18,668	56.96%
Marie-Arlette Carlotti	Socialist Party	PS	8,600	24.55%	14,107	43.04%
Childéric Jérôm Muller	Democratic Movement	MoDem	2,343	6.69%		
Marie-Claude Aucouturier	National Front	FN	2,340	6.68%		
Maruja Otero	Communist	COM	1,384	3.95%		
Frédéric Falzon	Far Left	EXG	1,019	2.91%		
Pierre Semeriva	The Greens	VEC	872	2.49%		
Eric Talles	Ecologist	ECO	495	1.41%		
Olivier Jerez	Movement for France	MPF	334	0.95%		
Guy Jullien	Miscellaneous Right	DVD	232	0.66%		
Marc Cecon	Far Left	EXG	193	0.55%		
Mireille Haas	Far Right	EXD	165	0.47%		
Corine Raynaud	Far Left	EXG	162	0.46%		
Martine Pentz	Divers	DIV	139	0.40%		
Valérie Bellaire	Divers	DIV	0	0.00%		
Total			35,028	100%	32,775	100%
Registered voters			60,376		60,365	
Blank/Void ballots			399	1.13%	914	2.71%
Turnout			35,427	58.68%	33,689	55.81%
Abstentions			24,949	41.32%	26,676	44.19%
Result					UMP HOLD	

=== 2002 ===
Legislative Election 2002: Bouches-du-Rhône's 1st constituency
Party	Candidate	Votes	%	±%
UMP	Roland Blum	13,895	39.89	
PS	Marie-Arlette Carlotti	9,026	25.92	
FN	Marie-Claude Aucouturier	6,577	18.88	
PCF	Mireille Mavrides	1,476	4.24	
DVD	Rene Chouraqui	755	2.17	
Others	N/A	3,100		
Turnout		35,358	64.08	
2nd round result
UMP	Roland Blum	17,879	60.18	
PS	Marie-Arlette Carlotti	11,829	39.82	
Turnout		31,185	56.53	
UMP hold				

=== 1997 ===
Legislative Election 1997: Bouches-du-Rhône's 1st constituency
Party	Candidate	Votes	%	±%
UDF	Roland Blum	10,236	31.12	
FN	Jean-Pierre Baumann	7,876	23.95	
PS	Marie-Arlette Carlotti	7,586	23.06	
PCF	Martine Herve	3,267	9.93	
GE	Thierry Boyer	816	2.48	
LO	Yves Daien	695	2.11	
Others	N/A	2,414		
Turnout		33,945	62.13	
2nd round result
UDF	Roland Blum	16,442	44.20	
PS	Marie-Arlette Carlotti	14,358	38.59	
FN	Jean-Pierre Baumann	6,401	17.21	
Turnout		38,022	69.60	
UDF hold				
