= Canton of Berre-l'Étang =

Coordinates: 43.48°N 5.17°E

Berre-l'Étang
- Canton
- Interactive map of Berre-l'Étang
- Country: France
- Region: Provence-Alpes-Côte d'Azur
- Department: Bouches-du-Rhône
- No. of communes: {{{nbcomm}}}

Government
  - Representatives (2021–2028): Julie Arias; Yannick Guérin
- Area: 249.86 km^{2} (96.47 sq mi)
- Population (2023): 74,310
  - Density: 297.4/km^{2} (770.3/sq mi)
- INSEE code: 13 06

The canton of Berre-l'Étang is an administrative division of the Bouches-du-Rhône department, in southeastern France. At the French canton reorganisation which came into effect in March 2015, it was expanded from 3 to 9 communes. Its seat is in Berre-l'Étang.

== Composition ==
It consists of the following communes:

1. Berre-l'Étang
2. Cornillon-Confoux
3. Coudoux
4. La Fare-les-Oliviers
5. Lançon-Provence
6. Rognac
7. Saint-Chamas
8. Velaux
9. Ventabren

== Councillors ==
Election	Councillors	Party	Occupation
2015	Christiane Pujol	FN	Commercial
2015	Jean-Marie Verani	FN	Civil servant
2021	Julie Arias	LR	Mayor of Lançon-Provence
2021	Yannick Guérin	LR	Mayor of Velaux

== Pictures of the canton ==
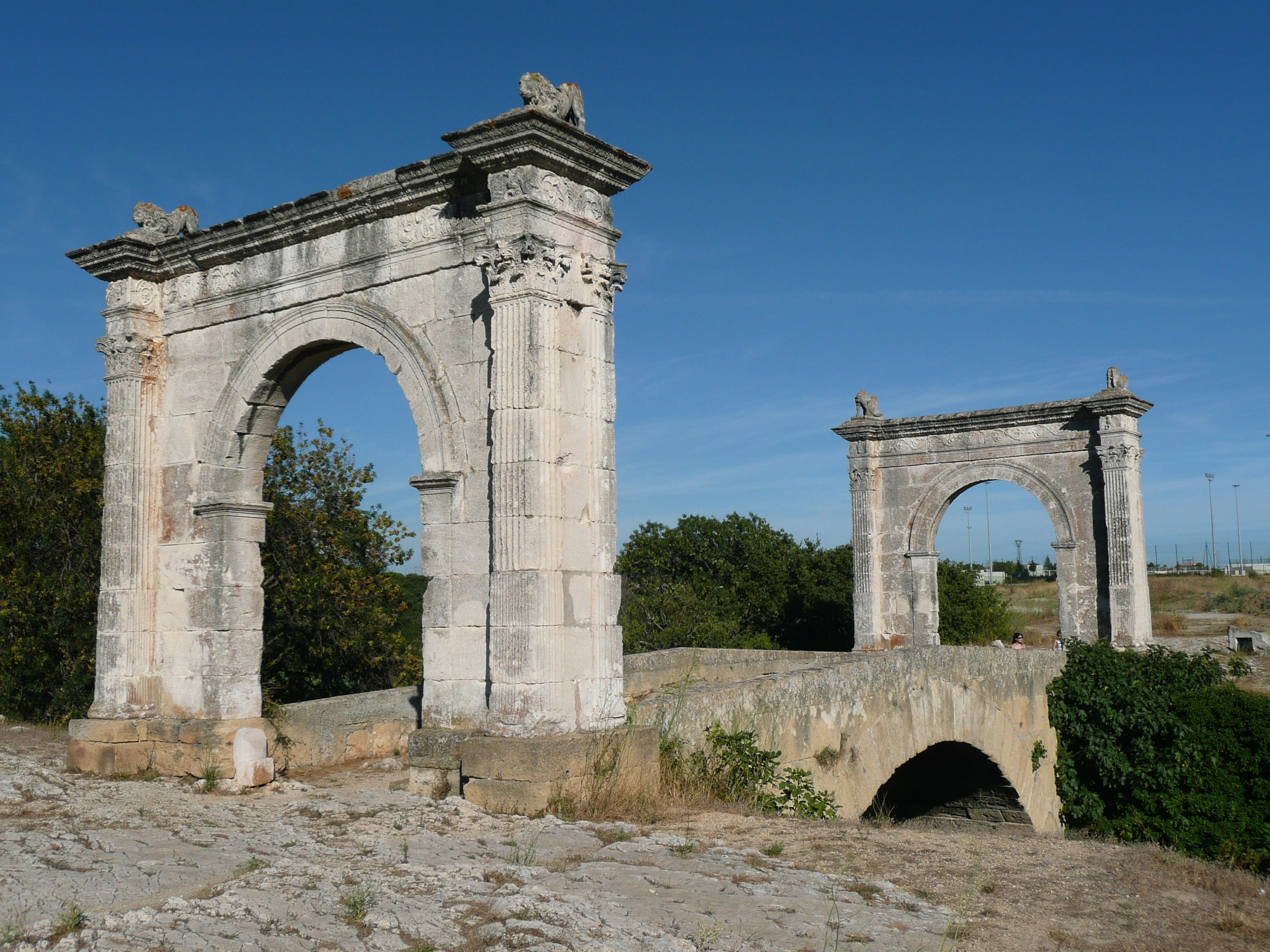
The Pont Flavien in Saint-Chamas

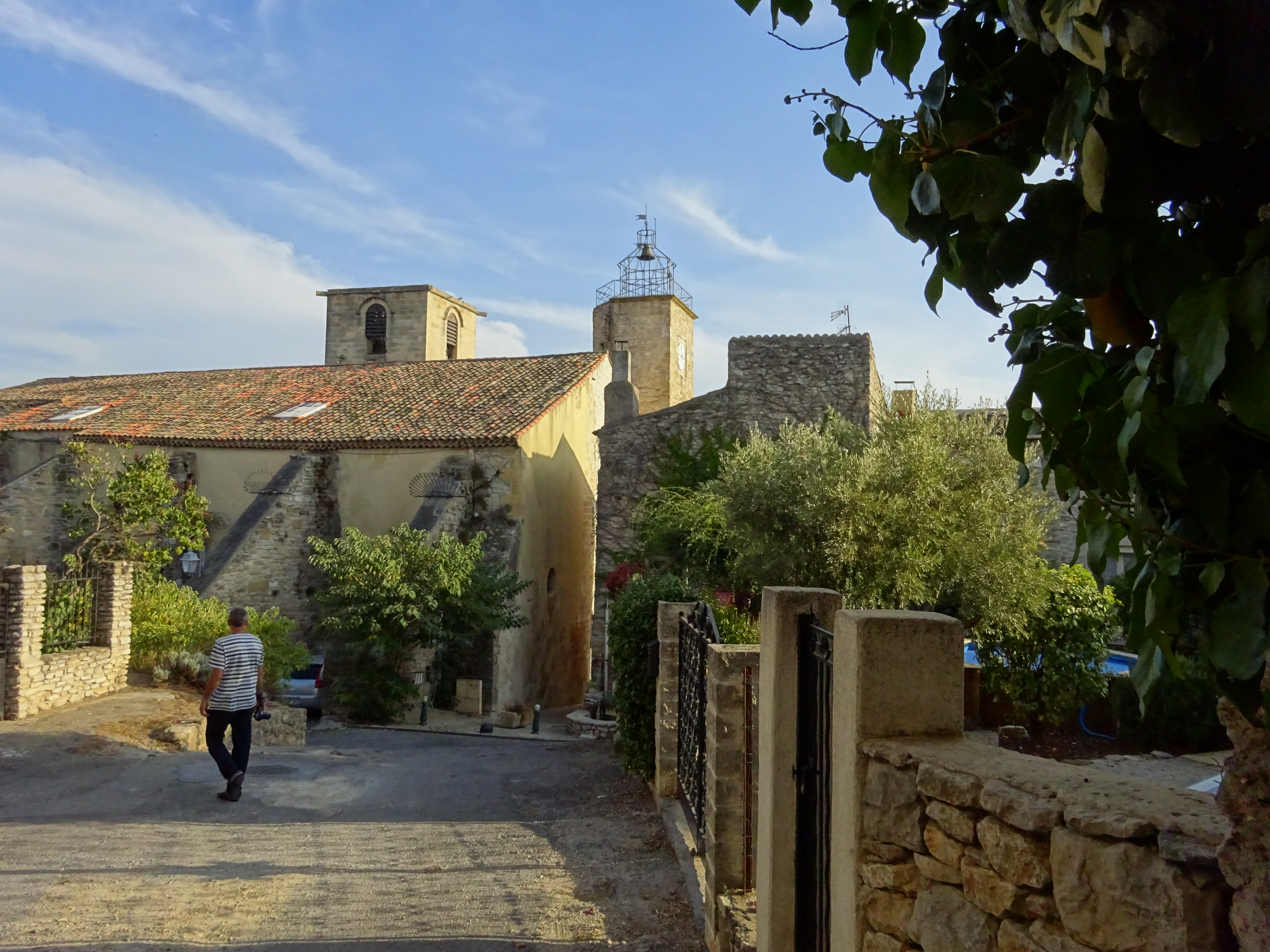
Lançon-Provence's street

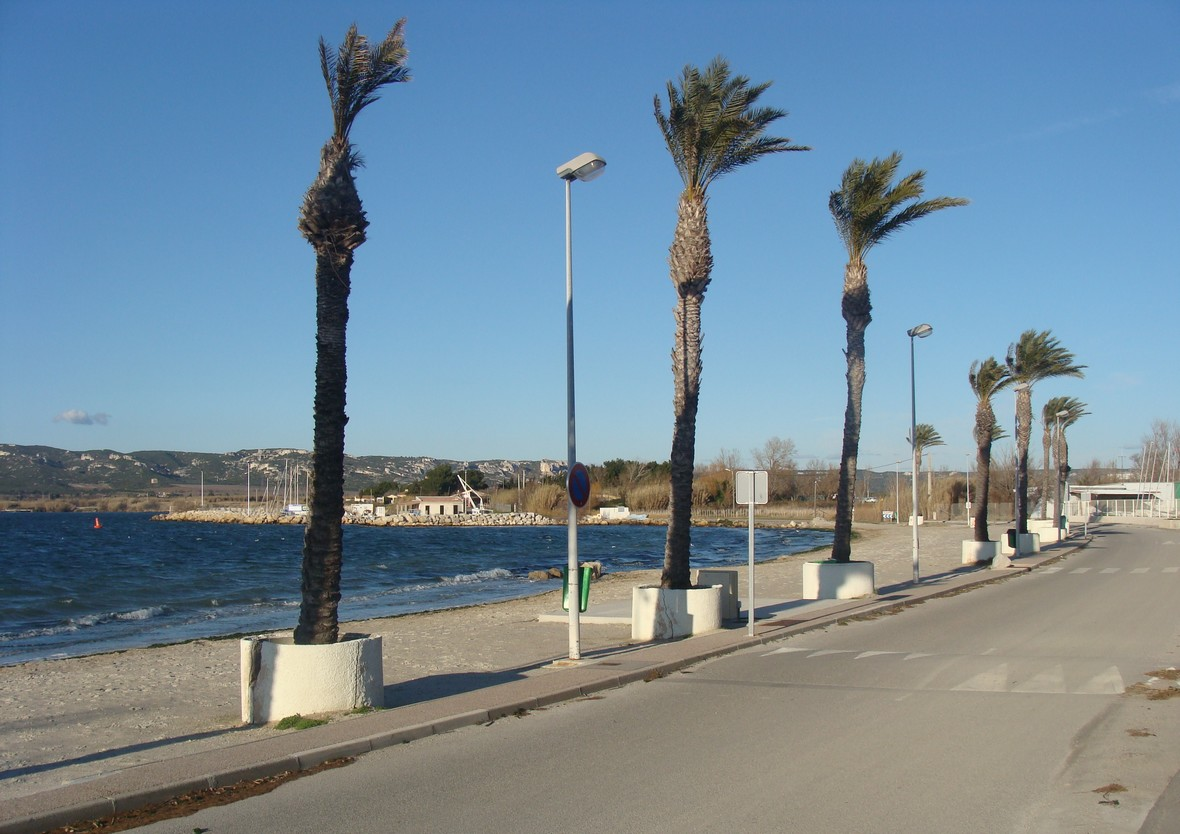
Berre-l'Étang's beach
