= Julien Ravier =

French politician

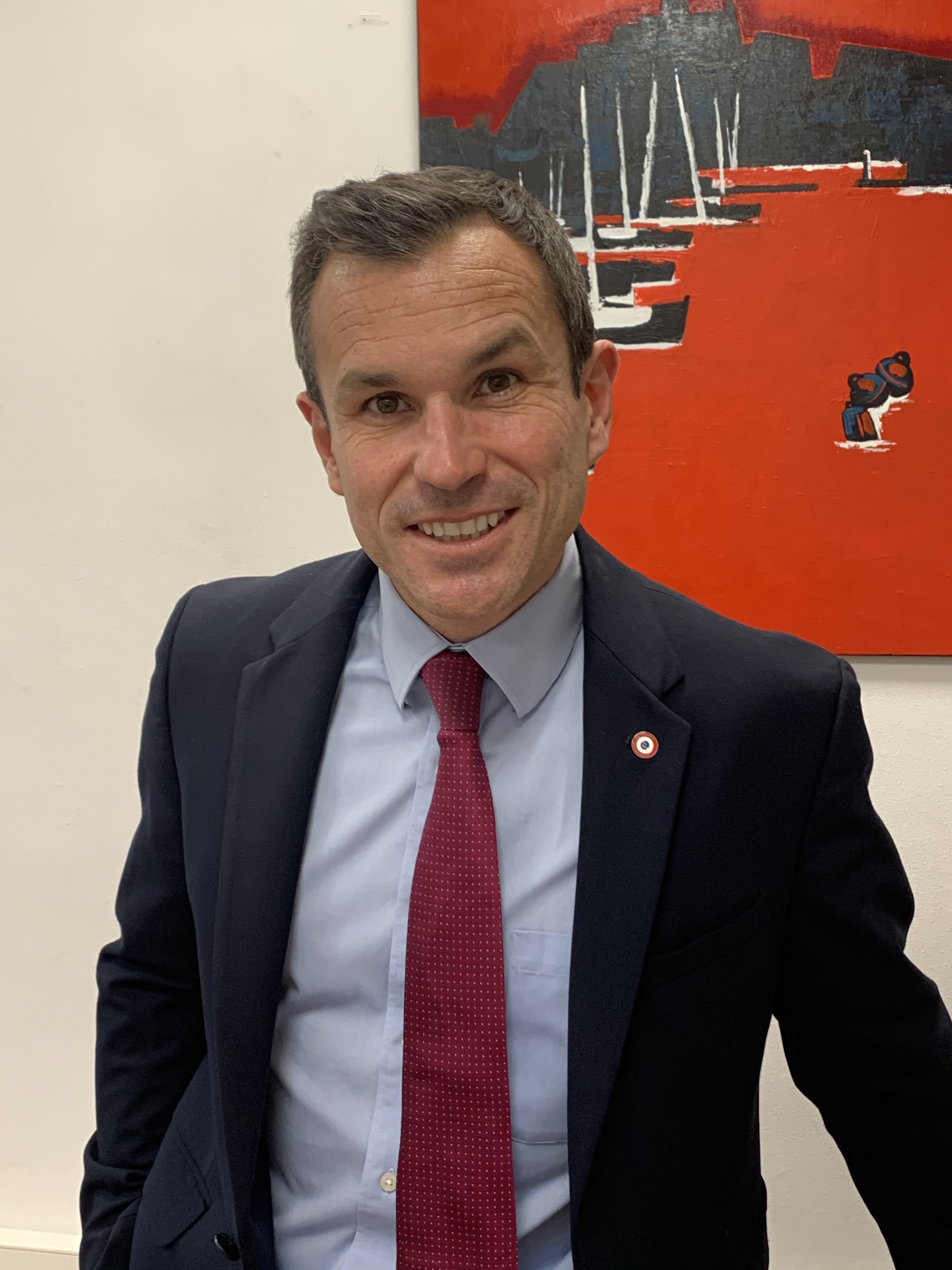

Member of the National Assembly for Bouches-du-Rhône's 1st constituency
- In office 8 October 2020 – 21 June 2022
- Preceded by: Valérie Boyer
- Succeeded by: Sabrina Agresti-Roubache

Personal details
- Born: 16 February 1978 (age 48) Marseille, France
- Party: Union for a Popular Movement (until 2015); The Republicans (since 2015)

Julien Ravier (born 16 February 1978) is a French Republican politician who has been the Member of Parliament for Bouches-du-Rhône's 1st constituency since 2020.

== Early life ==
Ravier was born in Marseille.

== Career ==
Ravier replaced Valérie Boyer in the National Assembly when she was elected in the 2020 French Senate election. As her substitute, Ravier took her seat in the Assembly.

Due to a court decision, he is ineligible to run for re-election in the 2022 French legislative election.

== See also ==
- List of deputies of the 15th National Assembly of France
