= Olivier Ferrand =

French civil servant and public intellectual (1969–2012)

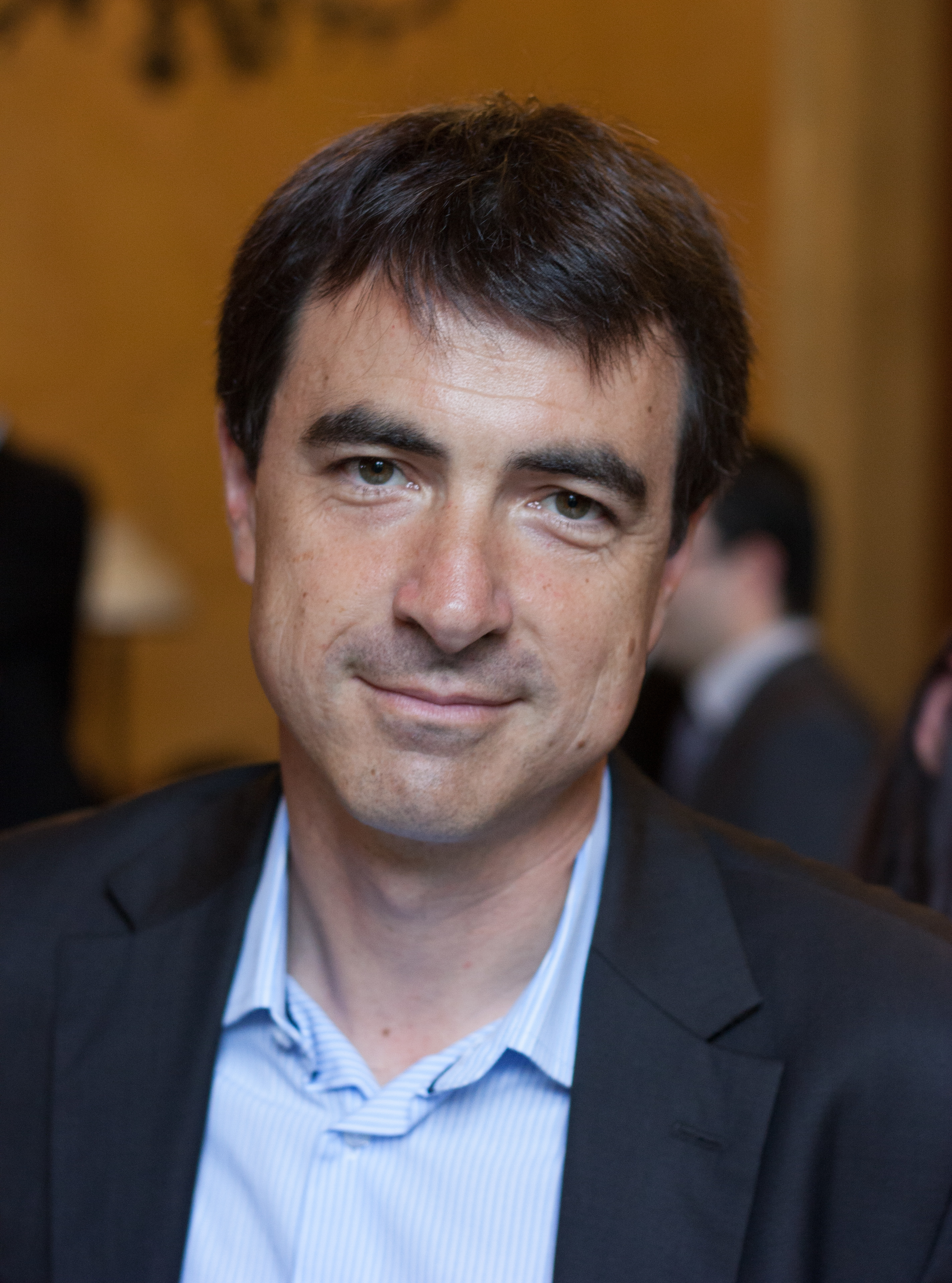

Member of the National Assembly for Bouches-du-Rhône's 8th constituency
- In office 20 June 2012 – 30 June 2012
- Preceded by: Valérie Boyer
- Succeeded by: Jean-Pierre Maggi

Personal details
- Born: 8 November 1969 Marseille, France
- Died: 30 June 2012 (aged 42) Velaux, France
- Resting place: Montmartre Cemetery
- Party: Socialist Party
- Education: HEC Paris; Sciences Po, ÉNA

Olivier Ferrand (8 November 1969 - 30 June 2012) was a French civil servant and public intellectual. He was the founder of Terra Nova, a prominent centre-left think tank in Paris. In June 2012 he was elected to the French Parliament. He died of a heart attack shortly afterwards, aged 42.

== Life and career ==
Ferrand was born in 1969 in Marseille and later studied at HEC Paris, Sciences Po, and École nationale d'administration. After ENA he joined the French Finance Ministry as a civil servant in the Treasury Directorate. In the early 2000s he was an adviser to Prime Minister Lionel Jospin. He then became an adviser to Pierre Moscovici as a member of the Convention on the Future of Europe and later to Dominique Strauss-Kahn as a leading figure of the French opposition. He also joined the Inspection des Finances during the 2000s.

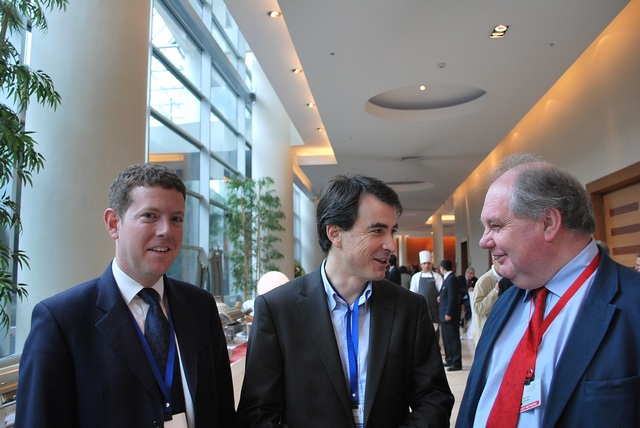
Olivier Ferrand

He created Terra Nova in 2008 and led it until his death. Terra Nova quickly emerged as a major voice in French policy debates, unambiguously on the centre-left but independent from the Socialist Party. Among its key contributions, spearheaded by Ferrand from 2008, was the recommendation of a system of open primaries to designate the Socialist Party's candidate to the next presidential election. The Socialist Party's adoption of this proposal led to the primary vote of October 2011, which was won by François Hollande.

Ferrand became a prominent public intellectual and participated in many French political and societal debates. He was the co-host of the Think Tank program of LCI TV, a columnist for Slate France, and a regular commentator on BFM TV and France Info. He wrote influential articles and reports on topics that included French political reform, European integration, pension reform, US politics, tax policy, and public sector reform. He also became directly involved in French politics. He was deputy mayor of the 3rd arrondissement of Paris from 2001 to 2007; candidate in the Pyrénées-Orientales department during the 2007 legislative election; and deputy mayor of Thuir in 2008. In 2012, he was elected member of the French Parliament for the 8th legislative district of the Bouches-du-Rhône department.

He died unexpectedly on 30 June 2012 and was survived by his wife and daughter. His memory was honored in a moment of silence in the French National Assembly on 3 July 2012. The next day, 4 July, a memorial service was held in Church of Saint-Sulpice in Paris for his funeral, with attendance of several French political leaders including Claude Bartolone, Bertrand Delanoë, Lionel Jospin, Arnaud Montebourg, Michel Rocard, Ségolène Royal, and Manuel Valls. In the United States, the Center for American Progress published a statement in Ferrand's memory highlighting his influence in the French center-left and internationally.

== See also ==
- Deputies of the 14th National Assembly of France by constituency
- Terra Nova (think tank)
