= Romain Tonussi =

French politician (born 1996)

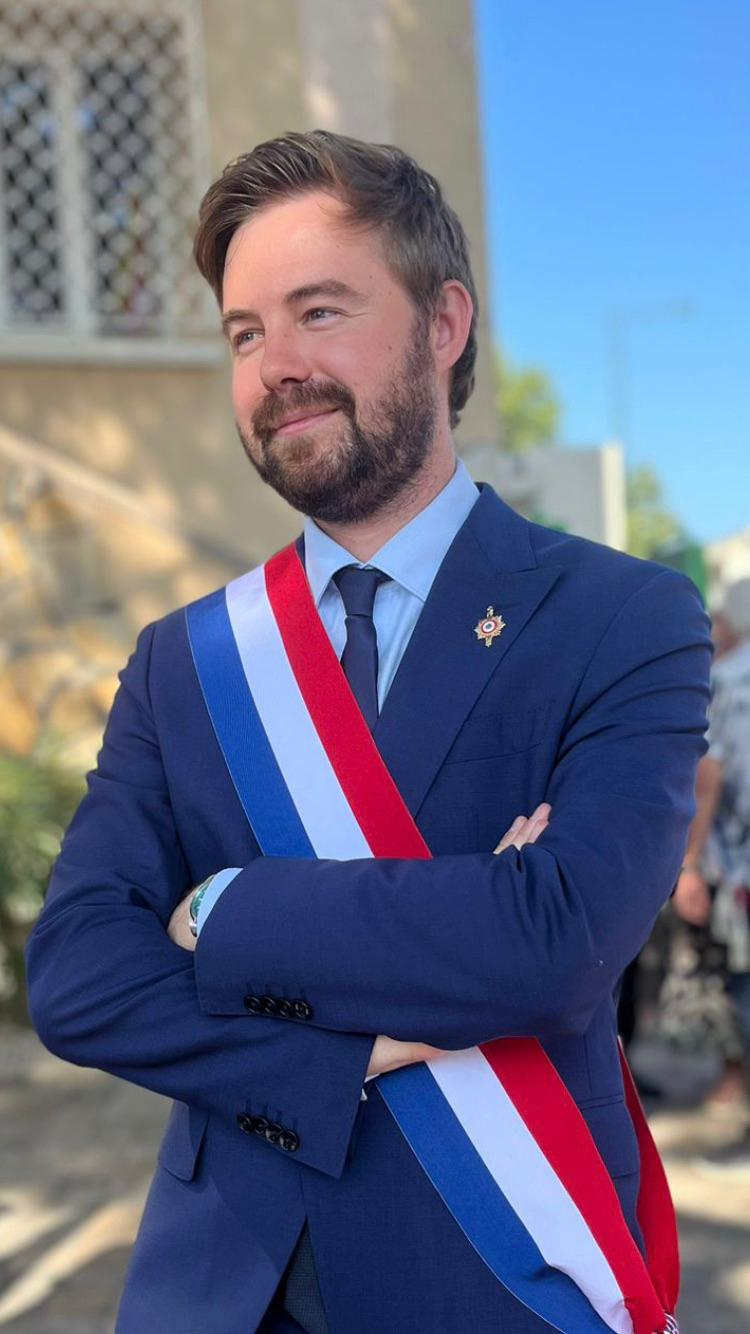
- Tonussi in 2024

Member of the French National Assembly for Bouches-du-Rhône's 8th constituency
- Incumbent
- Assumed office 18 July 2024
- Preceded by: Jean-Marc Zulesi

Personal details
- Born: 9 April 1996 (age 29)
- Political party: National Rally

Romain Tonussi (born 9 April 1996) is a French politician of the National Rally. He was elected member of the National Assembly for Bouches-du-Rhône's 8th constituency in 2024.

== Biography ==
Tonussi was born in Istres in 1996 and grew up in Miramas where he was elected opposition municipal councilor in 2020. He is a human resources manager by profession.

He first joined the RN in 2016. Tonussi was a candidate during the 2022 French legislative election for Bouches-du-Rhône's 8th constituency but lost to Jean-Marc Zulesi during the second round. He contested the same seat in 2024 and won.
