= Lançon-Provence =

Commune in Provence-Alpes-Côte d'Azur, France

- Commune
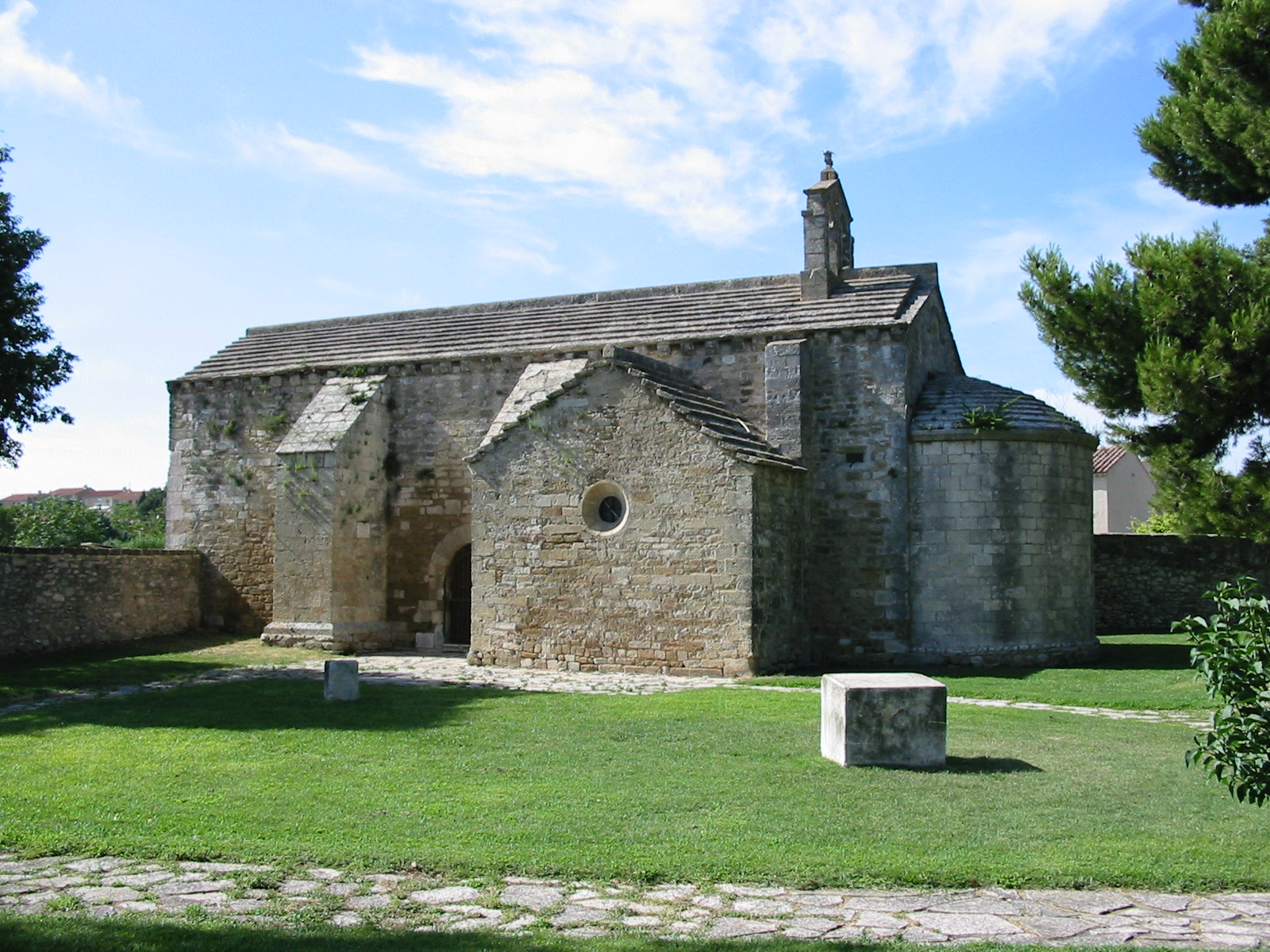
- Saint-Cyr Chapel

- Flag Coat of arms
- Location of Lançon-Provence
- Location within France Location within Provence-Alpes-Côte d'Azur
- Coordinates: 43°35′35″N 5°07′43″E
- Country: France
- Region: Provence-Alpes-Côte d'Azur
- Department: Bouches-du-Rhône
- Arrondissement: Aix-en-Provence
- Canton: Berre-l'Étang
- Intercommunality: Aix-Marseille-Provence

Government
  - Mayor (2026–32): Julie Arias
- Area^{1}: 68.92 km^{2} (26.61 sq mi)
- Elevation: 107 m (351 ft)
- Highest elevation: 236 m (774 ft)
- Lowest elevation: 3 m (9.8 ft)
- Population (2023): 9,915
  - Density: 143.9/km^{2} (372.6/sq mi)
- Time zone: UTC+01:00 (CET)
  - Summer (DST): UTC+02:00 (CEST)
- INSEE/Postal code: 13051 /13680
- ^{1} French Land Register data, which excludes lakes, ponds, glaciers > 1 km^{2} (0.386 sq mi or 247 acres) and river estuaries.

Lançon-Provence (French pronunciation: [lɑ̃sɔ̃ pʁɔvɑ̃s]; Occitan: Lançon de Provença, [ˈlansu de pʀuˈvɛnsɔ]), also known as Lançon-de-Provence (locally [lãⁿˈsɔ̃ᵑ də pχoˈvãⁿsə]), is a commune in the department of Bouches-du-Rhône, in the region of Provence-Alpes-Côte d'Azur, southern France.

== Population ==
Historical population

Year	Pop.	±% p.a.
1793	2,112	—
1800	2,209	+0.64%
1806	2,211	+0.02%
1821	2,090	−0.37%
1831	2,060	−0.14%
1836	2,015	−0.44%
1841	1,934	−0.82%
1846	1,906	−0.29%
1851	1,943	+0.39%
1856	1,909	−0.35%
1861	1,996	+0.90%
1866	2,022	+0.26%
1872	1,749	−2.39%
1876	1,663	−1.25%
1881	1,508	−1.94%
1886	1,473	−0.47%
1891	1,325	−2.10%
1896	1,290	−0.53%
1901	1,285	−0.08%

Year	Pop.	±% p.a.
1906	1,262	−0.36%
1911	1,125	−2.27%
1921	960	−1.57%
1926	947	−0.27%
1931	948	+0.02%
1936	921	−0.58%
1946	1,034	+1.16%
1954	1,428	+4.12%
1962	1,664	+1.93%
1968	2,018	+3.27%
1975	2,743	+4.48%
1982	3,990	+5.50%
1990	6,224	+5.72%
1999	6,688	+0.80%
2007	7,674	+1.73%
2012	8,473	+2.00%
2017	8,959	+1.12%
2023	9,915	+1.70%

Source: EHESS and INSEE (1968-2023)

== See also ==
- Communes of the Bouches-du-Rhône department
