= Berre-l'Étang =

Commune in Provence-Alpes-Côte d'Azur, France

- Commune
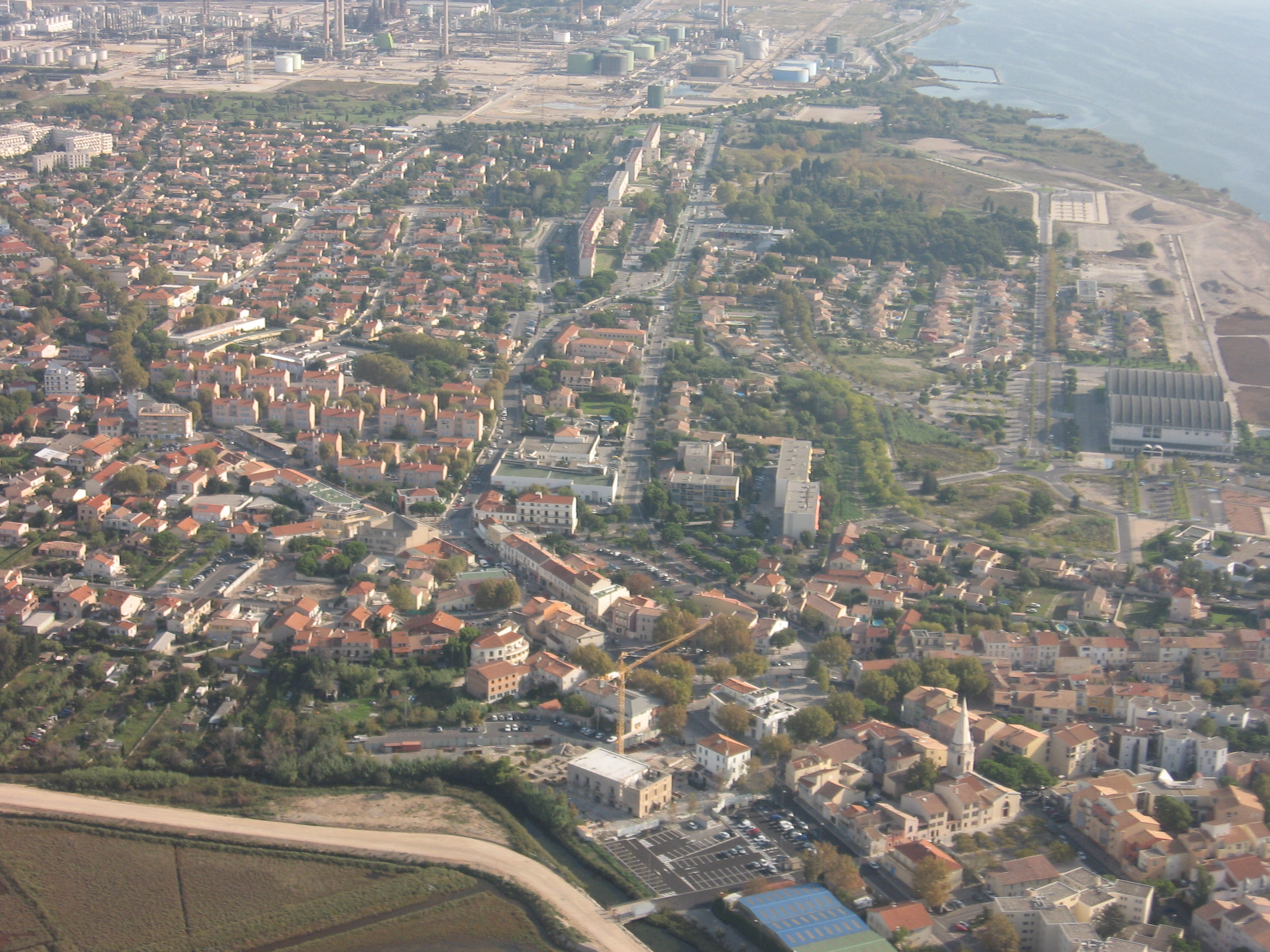
- An aerial view of Berre-l'Étang

- Coat of arms
- Location of Berre-l'Étang
- Location within France Location within Provence-Alpes-Côte d'Azur
- Coordinates: 43°28′34″N 5°10′07″E
- Country: France
- Region: Provence-Alpes-Côte d'Azur
- Department: Bouches-du-Rhône
- Arrondissement: Istres
- Canton: Berre-l'Étang
- Intercommunality: Aix-Marseille-Provence

Government
  - Mayor (2026–32): Mario Martinet
- Area^{1}: 43.64 km^{2} (16.85 sq mi)
- Elevation: 5 m (16 ft)
- Highest elevation: 146 m (479 ft)
- Lowest elevation: 0 m (0 ft)
- Population (2023): 13,832
  - Density: 317.0/km^{2} (820.9/sq mi)
- Time zone: UTC+01:00 (CET)
  - Summer (DST): UTC+02:00 (CEST)
- INSEE/Postal code: 13014 /13130
- ^{1} French Land Register data, which excludes lakes, ponds, glaciers > 1 km^{2} (0.386 sq mi or 247 acres) and river estuaries.

Berre-l'Étang (French pronunciation: [bɛʁ letɑ̃]; Occitan: Bèrra) is a commune in the Bouches-du-Rhône department in the Provence-Alpes-Côte d'Azur region in southern France.

== Population ==
Historical population

Year	Pop.	±% p.a.
1793	1,630	—
1800	1,069	−5.85%
1806	1,374	+4.27%
1821	1,622	+1.11%
1831	1,871	+1.44%
1836	1,928	+0.60%
1841	1,926	−0.02%
1846	1,905	−0.22%
1851	1,883	−0.23%
1856	1,930	+0.49%
1861	2,091	+1.62%
1866	1,980	−1.08%
1872	1,918	−0.53%
1876	2,036	+1.50%
1881	1,922	−1.15%
1886	1,811	−1.18%
1891	1,695	−1.32%
1896	1,570	−1.52%
1901	1,938	+4.30%

Year	Pop.	±% p.a.
1906	1,976	+0.39%
1911	1,725	−2.68%
1921	2,376	+3.25%
1926	2,355	−0.18%
1931	4,611	+14.38%
1936	5,998	+5.40%
1946	5,859	−0.23%
1954	7,922	+3.84%
1962	10,327	+3.37%
1968	11,588	+1.94%
1975	12,069	+0.58%
1982	12,562	+0.57%
1990	12,672	+0.11%
1999	13,414	+0.63%
2007	13,805	+0.36%
2012	13,978	+0.25%
2017	13,472	−0.73%
2023	13,832	+0.44%

Source: EHESS and INSEE (1968-2023)

== History ==
As early as the Gallo-Roman period, a settlement, Cadaroscum, existed at Berre. The chapel of Notre-Dame de Caderot may already have been built in the third century on the site of a pagan temple.

In the eleventh century, Berre was a walled settlement whose prosperity derived from salt extraction on the Étang de Berre. A first church dedicated to Saint Caesarius was built in 1041. During the Wars of Religion, Berre was captured on 20 August 1591 by Charles Emmanuel I, Duke of Savoy.

=== The L’Arc Airfield Project ===
The Étang de Berre has a rich aeronautical tradition. Already at the end of the First World War, the site of L’Arc, situated on the shore of the lake, developed into a training centre for seaplane pilots. It was also over the Étang de Berre that, on 28 March 1910, Henri Fabre successfully tested the first seaplane he had constructed himself. After a flight of approximately 600 metres over the water, his aircraft, the Canard, succeeded in alighting on the surface without incident. This constituted a world first.

The training centre disappeared in 1926, but the seaplane base remained in operation. From November 1942 onwards, it was occupied by the Germans as part of Operation Anton, the code name for the military occupation of the so-called free zone of Vichy France by Germany and Italy. The operation was launched on 12 November 1942 in response to Operation Torch, the Allied landings in North Africa.

During the Second World War, the Vichy government considered the construction, on the territory of Berre-l’Étang, of what was intended to become the largest airfield in southern Europe. This prestigious post-war project was designed to replace the existing airfield, which was considered too small, with a large intercontinental infrastructure covering approximately 900 hectares. Its realisation would have required the expropriation of 229 owners, in an area extending from the mouth of the Arc in the north to the hamlets of Mauran and Saint-Estève in the east, and from the vicinity of the Étang de Drignon in the south to the edge of the salt marshes, along the road to the Grand Port.

On 4 June 1943, the Marseille Chamber of Commerce approached the firm Hersent regarding works connected with this large-scale airport project at Berre. A few weeks later, on 29 June 1943, the engineer Georges Chedal-Anglay, acting as Hersent’s representative, asked François Giacomini and Jan Ackermans of Ackermans & van Haaren whether they would be willing to collaborate in the construction of the seaplane base at L’Arc. Their answer was unequivocally negative. Jan Ackermans put forward, in particular, legal and commercial arguments intended to cause the project to fail.

The military airfield was closed in 1972.

== See also ==
- Étang de Berre
- Communes of the Bouches-du-Rhône department
