= Terra Nova (think tank) =

French centre-left think tank

- Formation: May 2008
- Founder: Olivier Ferrand
- Type: Think tank
- Headquarters: Paris
- President: Lionel Zinsou
- Key people: François Chérèque
- Website: tnova.fr

Terra Nova is a French independent think tank or "Progressive Foundation" considered close to the French Socialist Party, and later to the French President, Emmanuel Macron. It produces reports and analyses of current political issues and aims to contribute to public debate by formulating progressive policy solutions. Through its work it also seeks to contribute to the renewal of social democracy and social democratic ideas in France and across Europe.

== History ==
Terra Nova was set up in 2008 by Olivier Ferrand (future Socialist Party deputy and former adviser to Prime Minister Lionel Jospin) in order to contribute to the intellectual renewal of left-wing politics. Since then, Terra Nova has gained significant influence in political and media circles, producing over 30 major reports between 2008 and 2012, which have been frequently reported in newspapers such as Le Monde and Libération. In 2009, it was a Terra Nova report of 2008 that was instrumental in persuading the Socialist Party to adopt a system of open primaries (see French Socialist Party presidential primary, 2011) for the 2012 French presidential election. In the same year, another Terra Nova report proved controversial in arguing that the Left should rely less on a traditional working class electorate and more on a broad coalition of women, young people, and ethnic minorities, all united by 'Progressive Values'.

== Work ==
Terra Nova's work broadly consists of two different kinds of publication: long, detailed analyses of public policy issues known as 'reports', and shorter 'policy briefs' or 'notes' on current affairs, which are published on Terra Nova's website several times a week.

For the production on its analyses, Terra Nova relies on a broad network of external experts, largely academics, researchers, civil servants, and people with experience in relevant fields. These experts are organized into working groups based around a particular policy area, or 'theme', such as 'Education', 'Financial regulation' or 'Environment'.

Terra Nova also seeks to stimulate public debate and engagement with policy issues by organizing major public events, such as debates and round-tables with experts, leading politicians, and other public figures.

Lastly, Terra Nova engages with young people through its student wing, Terra Nova Etudiants, which similarly produces reports and policy briefings and organizes events.

== Management ==
Since the death of founder Olivier Ferrand in 2012, the President of Terra Nova was François Chérèque, former secretary-general of one of France's largest trade unions, the CFDT. Together with a bureau, and an administrative council made up of a range of political, academic and business personalities, he oversees the work and political direction of Terra Nova, while day-to-day management is carried out by a Director-General. In June 2017, Chérèque was succeeded by Lionel Zinsou.

== Political positions ==
Although officially independent and with no organizational links to any party, Terra Nova has traditionally been seen close to the Socialist Party. For example, founder Olivier Ferrand was elected to the National Assembly for the Socialist Party in 2012. However, Terra Nova has been unafraid to criticize official Socialist policy at times, and with a Socialist Party government since 2012 its role as an independent think tank has left it in a strong position to formulate independent policy analyses that do not necessarily take the government line.

As a left-wing think tank, Terra Nova was deeply critical of the policies of former President Nicolas Sarkozy, arguing that his fiscal policies benefited large businesses and the well-off at the expense of ordinary families, and considering his hard-line policies on immigration and security 'anti-republican'.

However, Terra Nova's positions have also elicited controversy within the Left, particularly its support for pension reform, and its desire to re-orient left-wing electoral strategy around an electorate based more on progressive values than class.

In 2009, it was a Terra Nova report of 2008 that was instrumental in persuading the Socialist Party to adopt a system of open primaries to choose its candidate for the 2012 Presidential Elections.

Since the election of the Socialist Party candidate Francois Hollande to the French Presidency in the 2012 elections, Terra Nova has been seen as a critical friend of the government. Recently, Terra Nova's report on banking reform, which contained a proposal to separate the commercial and investment wings of major banks, was seen as a critique of the socialist government's more cautious policy.

Most recently, Terra Nova has called for major investment in pre-school and early childhood as one of the best ways to promote social mobility and more equal life chances.

== Awards ==
In both 2011 and 2012, the Assembly of French Chambers of Commerce and Industry, together with the Observatory of French Think Tanks, awarded Terra Nova the prize for French Think Tank of the Year.

== Controversy ==
Among the founding members of Terra Nova was Christophe Bejach, a convicted pedocriminal, guilty of attempting to organise a pornographic photoshoot with young girls aged 8 to 12.
