= La Fare-les-Oliviers =

Commune in Provence-Alpes-Côte d'Azur, France

La Fare-les-Oliviers La Fara deis Oliviers (Occitan)
- Commune
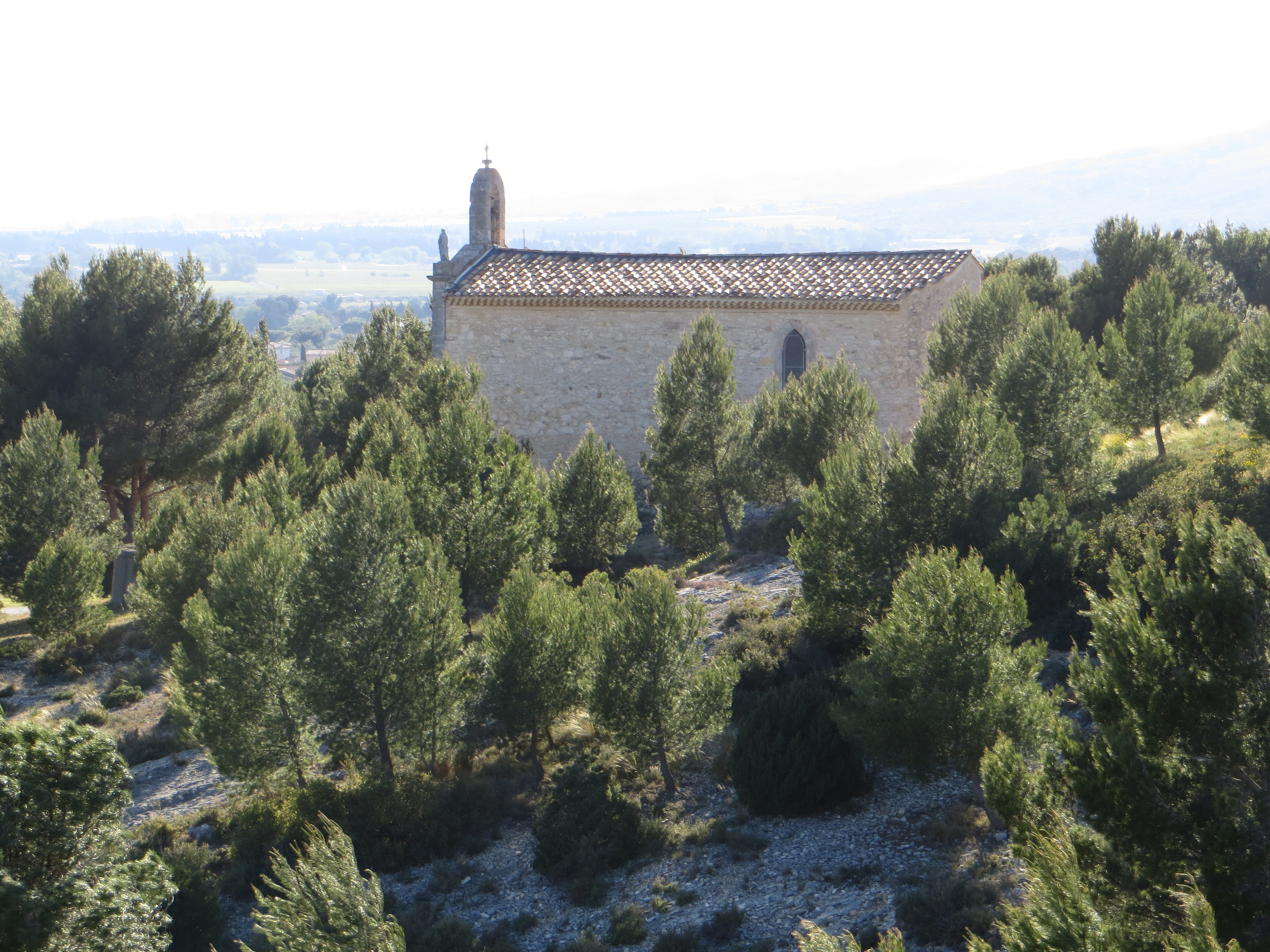
- Sainte-Rosalie chapel

- Coat of arms
- Location of La Fare-les-Oliviers
- Location within France Location within Provence-Alpes-Côte d'Azur
- Coordinates: 43°33′09″N 5°11′42″E
- Country: France
- Region: Provence-Alpes-Côte d'Azur
- Department: Bouches-du-Rhône
- Arrondissement: Aix-en-Provence
- Canton: Berre-l'Étang
- Intercommunality: Aix-Marseille-Provence

Government
  - Mayor (2026–32): Jérôme Marciliac
- Area^{1}: 13.98 km^{2} (5.40 sq mi)
- Elevation: 53 m (174 ft)
- Highest elevation: 223 m (732 ft)
- Lowest elevation: 27 m (89 ft)
- Population (2023): 9,039
  - Density: 646.6/km^{2} (1,675/sq mi)
- Time zone: UTC+01:00 (CET)
  - Summer (DST): UTC+02:00 (CEST)
- INSEE/Postal code: 13037 /13580
- ^{1} French Land Register data, which excludes lakes, ponds, glaciers > 1 km^{2} (0.386 sq mi or 247 acres) and river estuaries.

La Fare-les-Oliviers (French pronunciation: [la faʁ le.z‿ɔlivje]; Occitan: La Fara deis Oliviers) is a commune in the Bouches-du-Rhône department in the Provence-Alpes-Côte d'Azur region in Southern France. It is part of the Aix-Marseille-Provence Metropolis.

== History ==
A locally renowned castle, Castellas, was built in the 10th century. In the 18th century, a pavilion was built in the centre of the village.

== Geography ==
La Fare-les-Oliviers is situated 20.6 km (12.8 mi) to the west-northwest of Aix-en-Provence and 12.5 km (7.7 mi) to the southeast of Salon-de-Provence.

== Demographics ==
Historical population

Year	Pop.	±% p.a.
1793	980	—
1800	1,069	+1.25%
1806	1,129	+0.91%
1821	1,208	+0.45%
1831	909	−2.80%
1836	1,293	+7.30%
1841	1,260	−0.52%
1846	1,316	+0.87%
1851	1,308	−0.12%
1856	1,329	+0.32%
1861	1,380	+0.76%
1866	1,372	−0.12%
1872	1,272	−1.25%
1876	1,176	−1.94%
1881	1,129	−0.81%
1886	1,193	+1.11%
1891	1,080	−1.97%
1896	1,084	+0.07%
1901	1,066	−0.33%

Year	Pop.	±% p.a.
1906	1,022	−0.84%
1911	954	−1.37%
1921	887	−0.73%
1926	951	+1.40%
1931	1,149	+3.86%
1936	1,160	+0.19%
1946	1,329	+1.37%
1954	1,680	+2.97%
1962	2,370	+4.40%
1968	2,747	+2.49%
1975	3,526	+3.63%
1982	5,043	+5.24%
1990	6,095	+2.40%
1999	6,334	+0.43%
2007	6,501	+0.33%
2012	7,618	+3.22%
2017	8,476	+2.16%
2023	9,039	+1.08%

Source: EHESS and INSEE (1968-2023)

== See also ==
- Communes of the Bouches-du-Rhône department
