= Roland Blum =

French politician

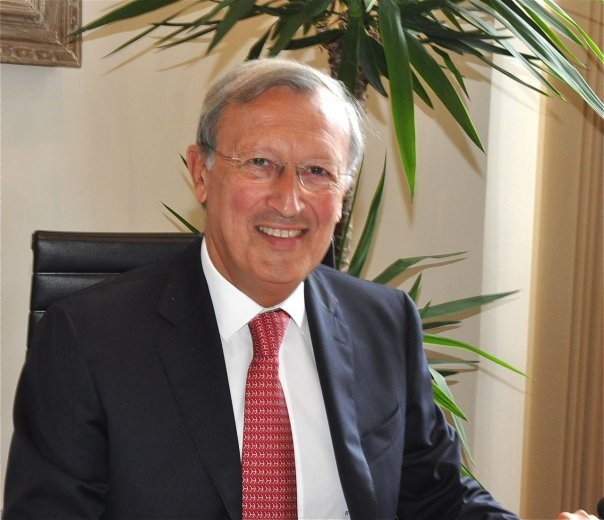

Roland Blum (born 12 July 1945 in Les Pennes-Mirabeau) is a French conservative politician and member of the National Assembly of France. He belongs to the Union for a Popular Movement (UMP).

== Life and career ==
A former student of the Institut d'études politiques d'Aix-en-Provence (science political school), he was elected deputy on 16 June 2002 in the Bouches-du-Rhône. He was the first French deputy to interpellate the government on the subject of Muhammad al-Durrah, a child killed in the Palestinian territories and filmed and commented by Charles Enderlin of France 2 TV, claiming it was a fake. The investigation has shown that such was not the case, and France 2 has deposed a complaint against X (equivalent to John Doe) on charges of defamation.

Following the request from Greens deputies Noël Mamère, Martine Billard and Yves Cochet on September 10, 2003, for the constitution of a Parliamentary Commission on the "role of France in the support of military regimes in Latin America from 1973 to 1984" before the Foreign Affairs Commission of the National Assembly, presided by Édouard Balladur (UMP), a request made following the investigations carried on by journalist Marie-Monique Robin, Roland Blum was nominated as responsible of the Commission. However, he refused to hear Marie-Monique Robin, and published in December 2003 a 12 pages report qualified by Robin as the summum of bad faith. It claimed that no military cooperation agreement had been signed between France and Argentina, despite the agreement found by Robin in the Quai d'Orsay, which showed that French veterans of the Algerian War were in mission in Buenos Aires from 1959 to 1981.

== See also ==
- Union for a Popular Movement (UMP, as of 2007 headed by Nicolas Sarkozy)
