= Valérie Boyer =

French politician (born 1962)

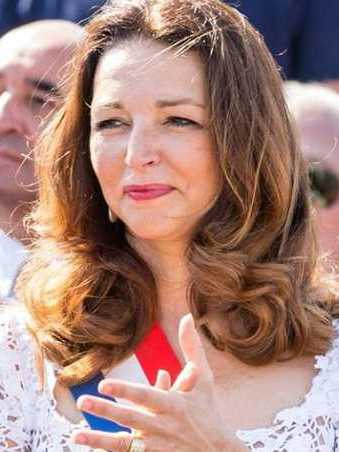

Senator for Bouches-du-Rhône
- Incumbent
- Assumed office 1 October 2020

Member of the National Assembly for Bouches-du-Rhône
- In office 20 June 2007 – 30 September 2020
- Preceded by: Christophe Masse
- Succeeded by: Julien Ravier
- Constituency: 8th (2007–2012); 1st (2012–2020)

Personal details
- Born: 11 June 1962 (age 64) Bourges, France
- Party: Rally for the Republic (until 2002); Union for a Popular Movement (until 2015); The Republicans (since 2015)
- Children: 3
- Education: Sciences Po Aix

Valérie Boyer (French pronunciation: [valeʁi bwaje]; born 11 June 1962) is a French politician who has served as a Senator for the Bouches-du-Rhône department since 2020. A member of The Republicans (LR), she was previously elected to the National Assembly from 2007 until 2020. Boyer has also been a municipal councillor of Marseille since 2001.

== Early life ==
Boyer was born on 11 June 1962 in Bourges. Her parents were born in Algeria and Tunis during French colonial occupation. They were pieds noirs who fled from Algeria in 1962.

== Political career ==
=== Member of the National Assembly, 2007–2020 ===
First elected to the municipal council of Marseille in the 2001 election, she became a member of the National Assembly in 2007. Boyer also served as a deputy (adjointe) to Mayor Jean-Claude Gaudin from 2008 to 2014 and held the mayorship of the 6th sector (11th and 12th arrondissements) of Marseille from 2014 to 2017.

Ahead of the presidential election in 2017, Boyer served as campaign spokesperson for François Fillon alongside Jérôme Chartier, as a party affiliate. In The Republicans' 2017 leadership election, she endorsed Laurent Wauquiez. Following his election, she was appointed the party's deputy secretary general in charge of relations with civil society.

In Parliament, Boyer served as member of the Committee on Foreign Affairs. In addition to her committee assignments, she was a member of the parliamentary friendship groups with Jordan, Armenia and South Sudan.

=== Member of the Senate, 2020–present ===
Boyer was elected to the French Senate in the 2020 French Senate election, and was replaced in the Assembly by Julien Ravier.

== Political positions ==
Boyer first drew attention in 2008 when she drafted a law which would make the promotion of extreme dieting a crime punishable by up to two years in prison and a fine of some $45,000; it passed the National Assembly, but later failed in the Senate. In 2009, she proposed a bill to punish advertisements which include anorexic models. She proposed to fine offenders with up to 30,000 euros.

On 22 December 2011, the National Assembly adopted a bill presented by Boyer, penalising denial of the Armenian genocide. This decision caused a controversy between France and Turkey. In the days that followed, she claimed to have received death and rape threats. No one was actually charged with these allegations. Turkish hackers took down the French Senate's website in order to protest the bill.

In 2019, Boyer opposed a bioethics law extending to homosexual and single women free access to fertility treatments such as in vitro fertilisation (IVF) under France's national health insurance; it was one of the campaign promises of President Emmanuel Macron and marked the first major social reform of his five-year term.

== Personal life ==
Boyer is a divorced mother of three.
