= EM Strasbourg Business School =

French business school

Coordinates: 48°35′00″N 7°46′24″E

- Motto: Be distinctive
- Type: Grande école
- Established: 1919
- Affiliations: University of Strasbourg
- Students: 3300 in 2018
- Location: (France) Strasbourg, France
- Campus: Urban
- Website: www.em-strasbourg.com/fr

EM Strasbourg Business School is a French business school located in Strasbourg, Alsace. It was established in 1919.

Since 2022, the school has held the triple accreditation of EQUIS, AACSB and AMBA. This combination of accreditations places EM Strasbourg among the top business schools worldwide.

== History ==
In 1919, at the initiative of the Chambre de Commerce et d'Industrie (CCI), the Institut d'Etudes Supérieures Spécialisées, or European Institute for Higher Business Studies, (IECS) was created.

In 1956, in accordance with the CCI, the IECS was attached to the University of Strasbourg and the French Ministry of Higher Education and Research, thus becoming the only French business school tied to a traditional university.

In 1999, the IECS moved to a new building, the PEGE (European Center of Management and Economics). The building covers 26,000 m^{2} (280,000 sq ft), over four levels.

On 12 October 2007 the school underwent a strategic merger with the IAE of Strasbourg, forming a new entity, named the EM Strasbourg Business School.

The school was the first French public institution to get a four-year "diversity" label issued by AFNOR in 2012.

In 2015, the School was accredited AACSB.

As of 2018 there were 3300 students.

== Programs ==
Students can focus their studies in banking and finance, entrepreneurship and management, finance, accounting and auditing, supply chain management, management of information systems, and marketing and sales. The school maintains a large undergraduate and graduate exchange program with nearly 200 partner institutions located in 55 countries all over the world, such as Trinity College Dublin, Indian Institute of Management Bangalore, and HEC Montréal.

== Ranking ==
Since 2000 and as of 2020 it has been one of the elite grandes écoles in France, ranking in the top 17 business schools in the nation. It is the only French business school to operate under the umbrella of a traditional university, the University of Strasbourg. This model was inspired by U.S. and other international models. The school is the only one in France to be ranked in the Shanghai academic ranking of world Universities through its affiliation with the University of Strasbourg.

In 2022, the Financial Times ranked the Masters in Management program 71st in the world.

In 2025, EM Strasbourg's Programme Grande École (PGE) is ranked 45th in the world by the Financial Times 2025 Masters in Management ranking (top 10 in France).

== Notable alumni ==
- Fatma Samoura, Secretary General of FIFA, 2016–2023
- Jean-Marc Zulesi, member of the National Assembly as of 2017
