= Cornillon-Confoux =

Commune in Provence-Alpes-Côte d'Azur, France

- Commune
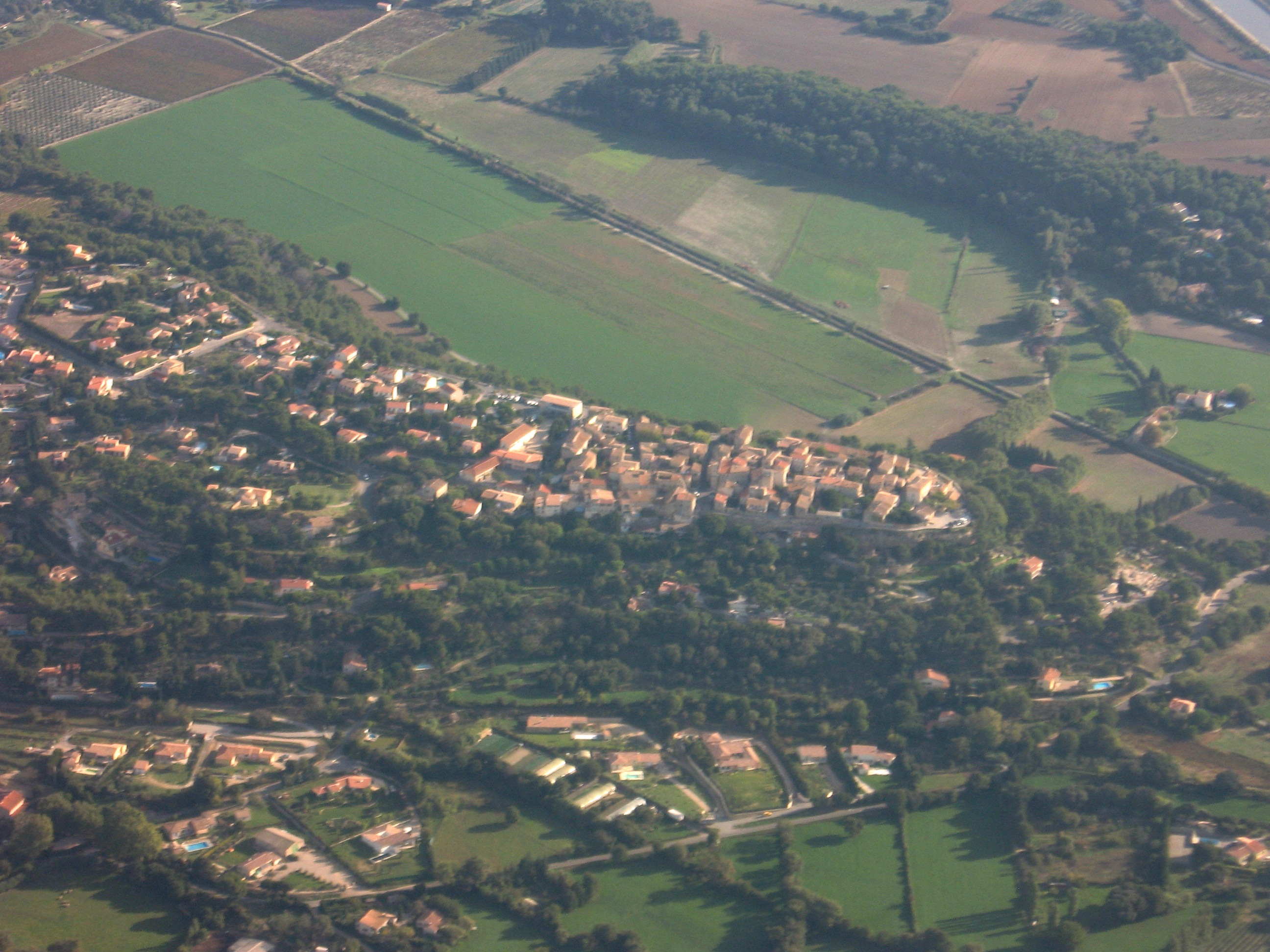
- An aerial view of Cornillon-Confoux

- Coat of arms
- Location of Cornillon-Confoux
- Location within France Location within Provence-Alpes-Côte d'Azur
- Coordinates: 43°33′48″N 5°04′20″E
- Country: France
- Region: Provence-Alpes-Côte d'Azur
- Department: Bouches-du-Rhône
- Arrondissement: Istres
- Canton: Berre-l'Étang
- Intercommunality: Aix-Marseille-Provence

Government
  - Mayor (2026–32): Daniel Gagnon
- Area^{1}: 14.95 km^{2} (5.77 sq mi)
- Elevation: 110 m (360 ft)
- Highest elevation: 190 m (620 ft)
- Lowest elevation: 21 m (69 ft)
- Population (2023): 1,667
  - Density: 111.5/km^{2} (288.8/sq mi)
- Time zone: UTC+01:00 (CET)
  - Summer (DST): UTC+02:00 (CEST)
- INSEE/Postal code: 13029 /13250
- Website: http://www.cornillonconfoux.fr/
- ^{1} French Land Register data, which excludes lakes, ponds, glaciers > 1 km^{2} (0.386 sq mi or 247 acres) and river estuaries.

Cornillon-Confoux (French pronunciation: [kɔʁnijɔ̃ kɔ̃fuks]; Occitan: Cornilhon e Conforç) is a commune of the Bouches-du-Rhône department in the region Provence-Alpes-Côte d'Azur. It belongs to the West Provence territory of the metropolis of Aix-Marseille-Provence.

== Culture ==
Adjacent to the church are three statues of very different women: the Victory of Ikaria, a sculpture by Polish artist Igor Mitoraj, inaugurated at the end of 2007; a Our Lady of Expectation (Virgin Mary pregnant) from 1865; and a Marianne, symbol of the French Republic.

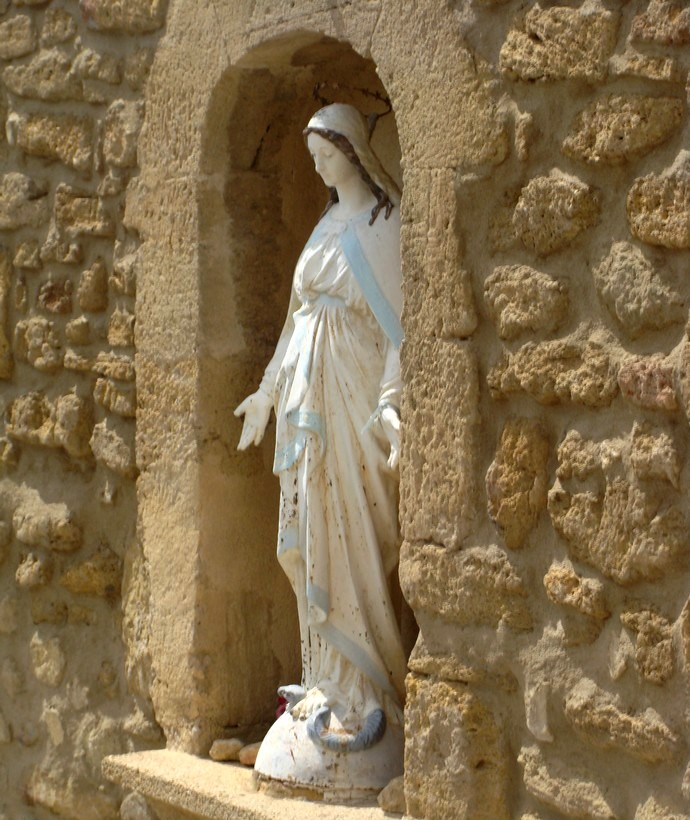
Maria gravida

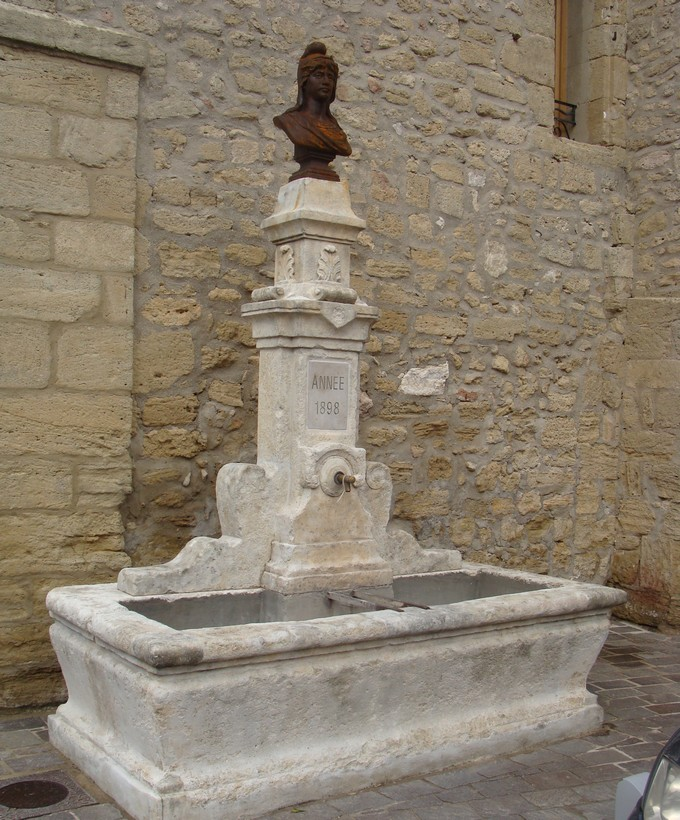
Marianne

There are many traditional French bories (stone shelters) located within the village and surrounding area, and a quite important apiary wall.

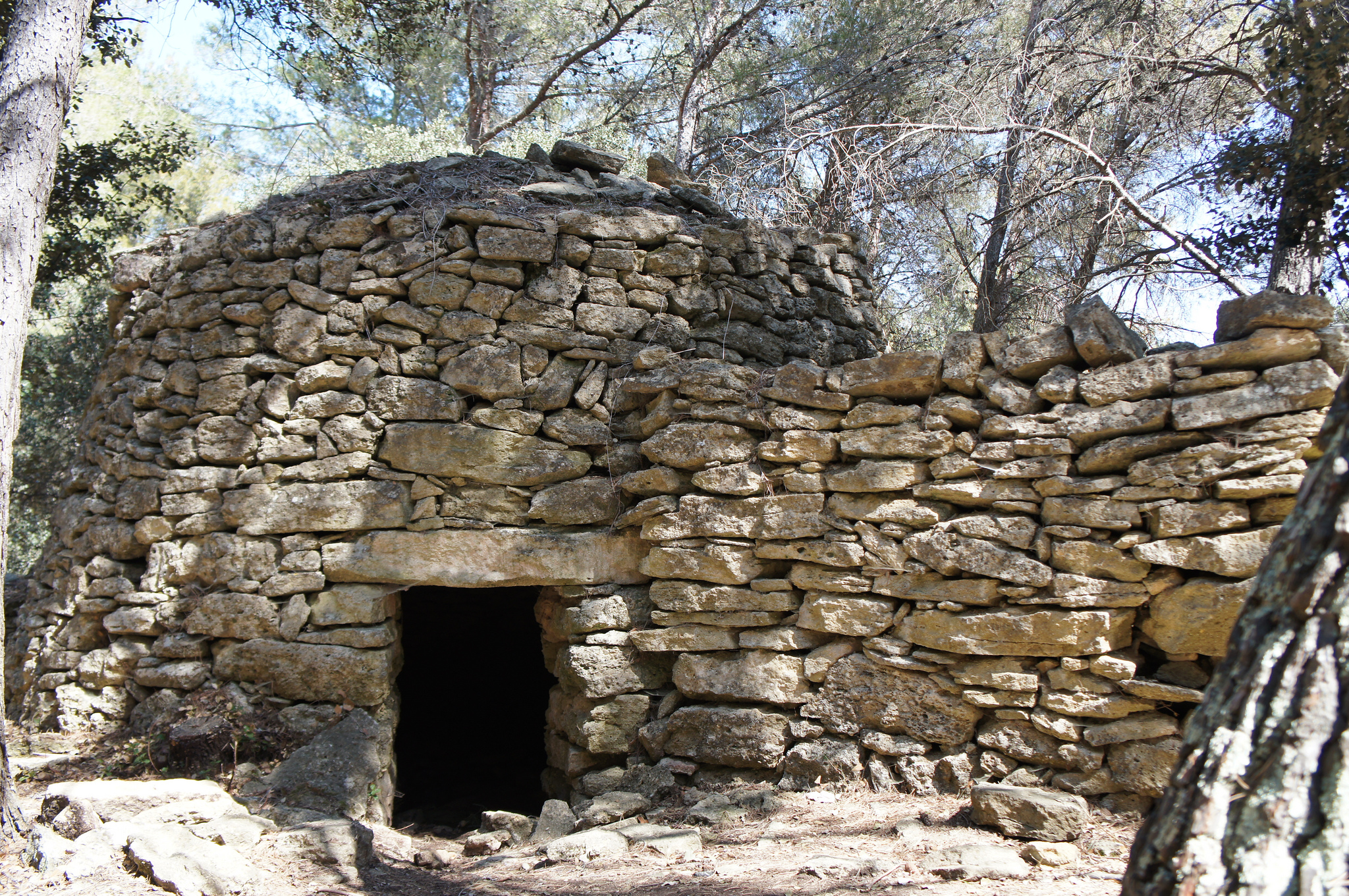

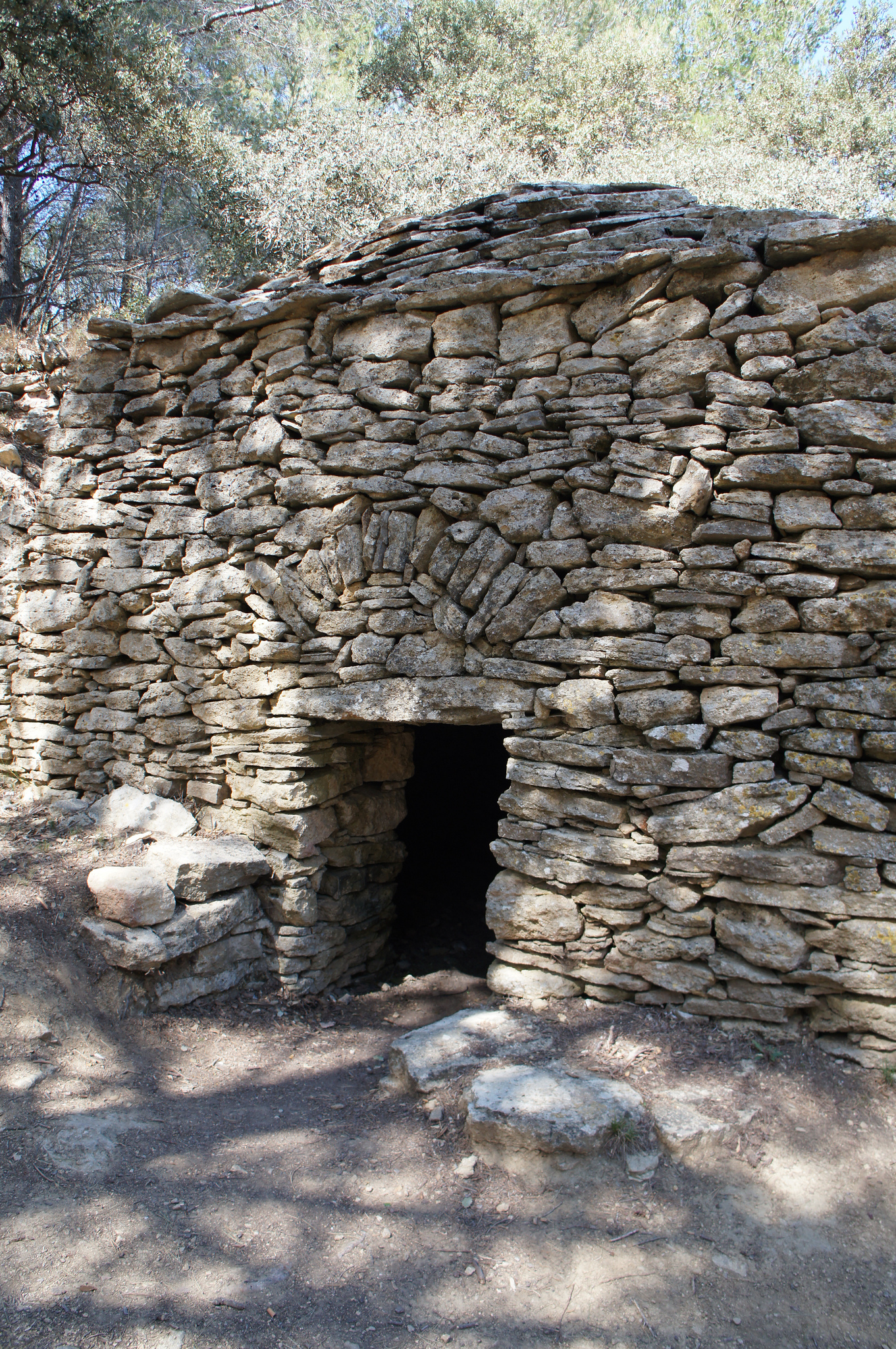

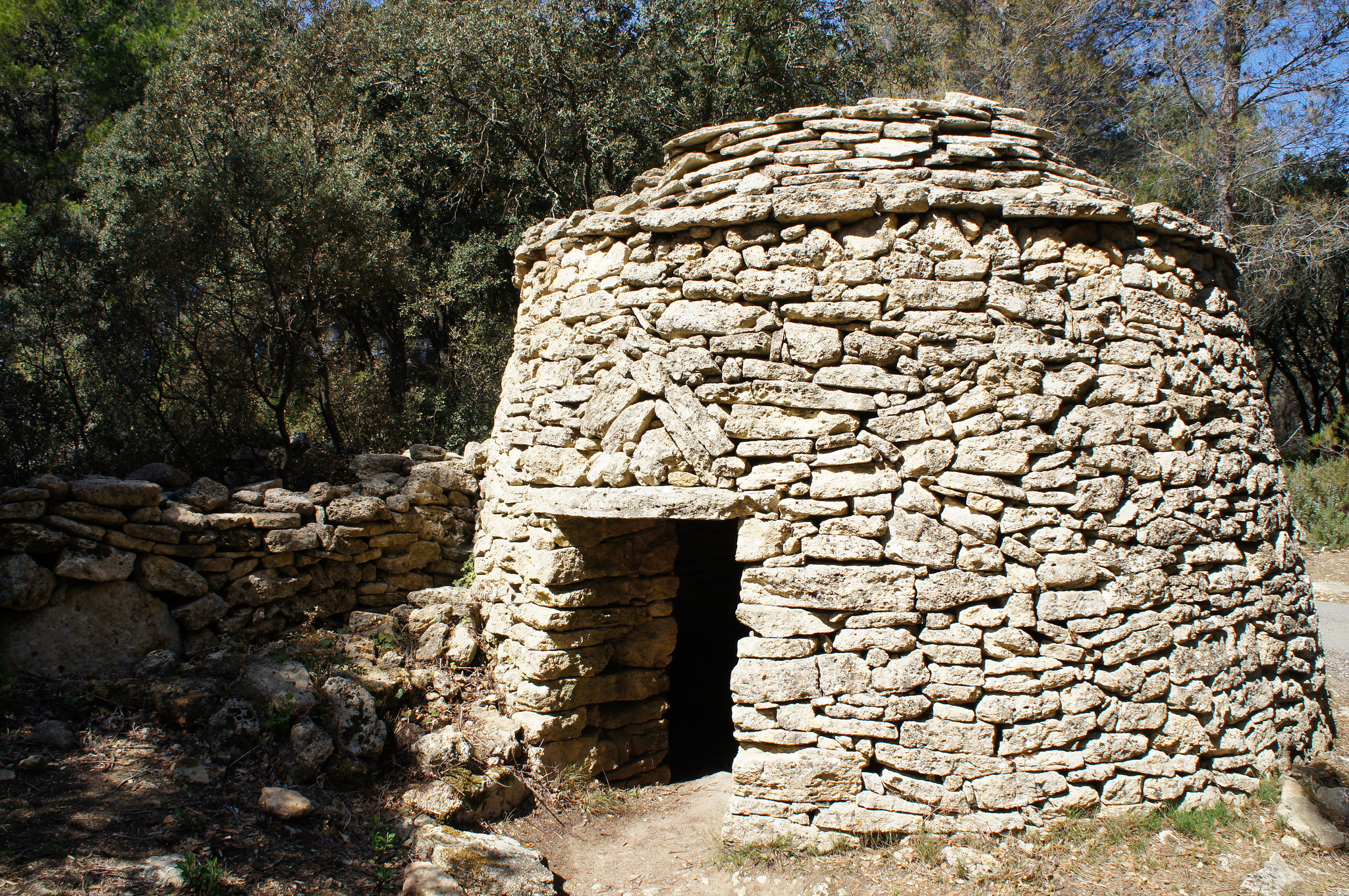

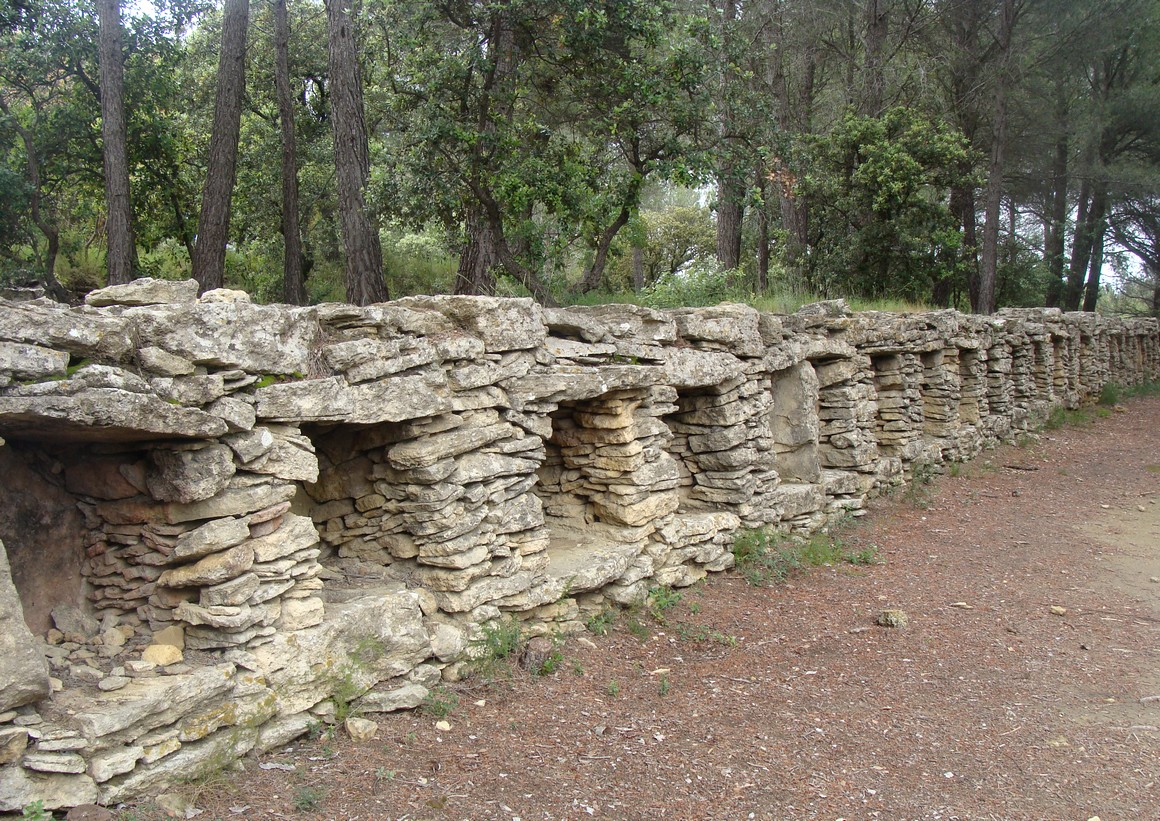

== Politics ==
=== Mayors ===
Table of Mayors to present day
Date		Name	Notes
1923	1945	Célestin Gros	
1945	1964	Arnould de Jessé	
1964	1965	Charles Liotard	
1965	1977	Bruno Carsignol	
1977	1983	Claude Pellat	
1983	1988	Jean-Pierre Van Acker	
1988	2001	Jacques d'Haillecourt	
2001	Present	Daniel Gagnon	Vice-president of the Aix-Marseille-Provence metropolis responsible for cultural facilities and culture

== Notable people ==
- Igor Mitoraj (1944–2014), sculptor
- Francisque Teyssier (born 1969), cyclist
- Mathilde Gros (born 1999), cyclist
- Paul Gros (1920–2013) historian and poet

== Population ==
Historical population
Year	Pop.	±% p.a.
1968	562	—
1975	810	+5.36%
1982	980	+2.76%
1990	1,060	+0.99%
1999	1,167	+1.07%
2007	1,327	+1.62%
2012	1,348	+0.31%
2017	1,373	+0.37%
2023	1,667	+3.29%
Source: INSEE

The inhabitants of the Cornillon-Confoux are called Cornillonnais in French.

== Climate ==
Months	J	F	M	A	M	J	J	A	S	O	N	D	Year
Maximum Temperature (°C)	10,9	12,3	15,3	17,5	22,0	25,8	29,4	29,0	25,0	19,9	14,2	11,6	19,4
Average Temperature (°C)	6,1	7,2	9,7	12,0	16,1	19,8	22,9	22,7	19,2	14,7	9,6	7,0	13,9
Minimum Temperature (°C)	1,2	2,0	4,0	6,4	10,1	13,7	16,4	16,3	13,3	9,5	4,9	2,4	8,4
Precipitation (mm)	59	47	44	63	52	31	16	37	64	98	58	54	623,4
Source: Météo France / Station de Salon de Provence

== See also ==
- Communes of the Bouches-du-Rhône department
