= Monique Griseti =

French politician

Member of the National Assembly for Bouches-du-Rhône's 1st constituency
- Incumbent
- Assumed office 8 July 2024
- Preceded by: Didier Parakian

Personal details
- Born: 23 July 1960 (age 65) Marseille, France
- Party: National Rally
- Relations: Franck Allisio (nephew)

Monique Griseti (born 23 July 1960) is a French politician. A member of the National Rally, she was elected deputy for Bouches-du-Rhône's 1st constituency during the 2024 French legislative election.

== Biography ==
Monique Griseti was born on 23 July 1960. She is married, mother of two daughters and grandmother of two granddaughters. After studying executive secretarial work, she worked in export, in secretarial work, then set up a family business. She joined the National Front at the age of 18. She was a candidate for the first time in the 2020 municipal elections, on the list of Franck Allisio, her nephew, then in the 2021 French departmental elections. Narrowly beaten in the second round of the 2022 French legislative election with 49.2% of the vote, she was elected in 2024 in the Bouches-du-Rhône's 1st constituency with 55.9% of the vote, without campaigning in the second round.

== Controversies ==
She is being questioned by newspapers for comments published on a social network considered conspiratorial and xenophobic, notably targeting the rapper Gims, against whom she declared: "He's just an opportunist who came to make his money here... let him go back to where he came from, let him bring his whole tribe with him. Let him go milk the goat, that will give us a holiday". In particular, she is promoting a film, Sound of Freedom, which some in the press accuse of echoing conspiracy theories.

== See also ==
- List of deputies of the 17th National Assembly of France
