= 1847 in architecture =

The year 1847 in architecture involved some significant architectural events and new buildings.

== Events ==
- May – The Architectural Association School of Architecture is founded in London.

== Buildings and structures ==
=== Buildings opened ===
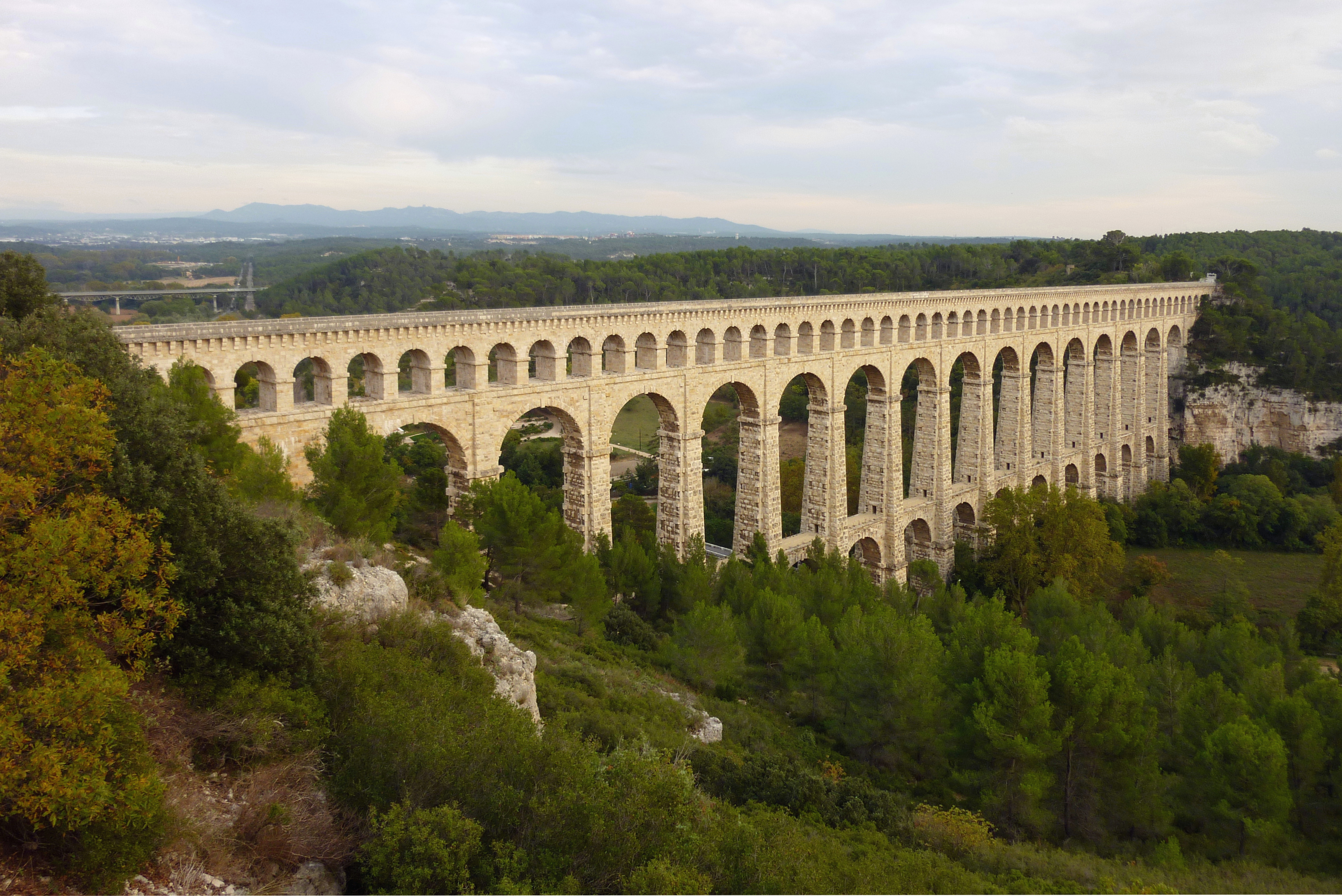
The Roquefavour Aqueduct in the south of France

- March 31 – The first mass is celebrated in St. Patrick's Basilica, Montreal, designed by Pierre-Louis Morin and Father Félix Martin.
- April 15 – Lords Chamber in the Palace of Westminster in London, rebuilt to the design of Charles Barry with decoration by Augustus Pugin.
- June 28 – Trains first use Broadstone railway station in Dublin, Ireland, designed by John Skipton Mulvany.
- June 30 – Water first flows along the Roquefavour Aqueduct in the south of France, engineered by Jean François Mayor de Montricher.
- August 3 – Trains first use Huddersfield railway station in the north of England, designed by James Pigott Pritchett.
- September 10 – Trains first use Carlisle Citadel railway station in the north of England, designed by William Tite.
- November – Trains first use Bury St Edmunds railway station in the east of England, probably designed by Sancton Wood.
- First performance at the Carltheater in Vienna, designed by Eduard van der Nüll and August Sicard von Sicardsburg.

=== Buildings completed ===
- Madina Mosque, Murshidabad, West Bengal, India, rebuilt under the supervision of Sadeq Ali Khan.
- St Marie's Church (Roman Catholic), Rugby, England, designed by Augustus Pugin.
- Rectory, Rampisham, Dorset, England, designed by Augustus Pugin.

== Awards ==
- Grand Prix de Rome, architecture – Louis-Jules André.

== Births ==
- March 21 – Fredrik Olaus Lindström, Swedish city architect (died 1919)
- April 16 – Hans Auer, Austrian architect (died 1906)
- June 9 – Alajos Hauszmann, Austro-Hungarian architect and professor (died 1926)
- August 24 – Charles Follen McKim, American architect (died 1909)

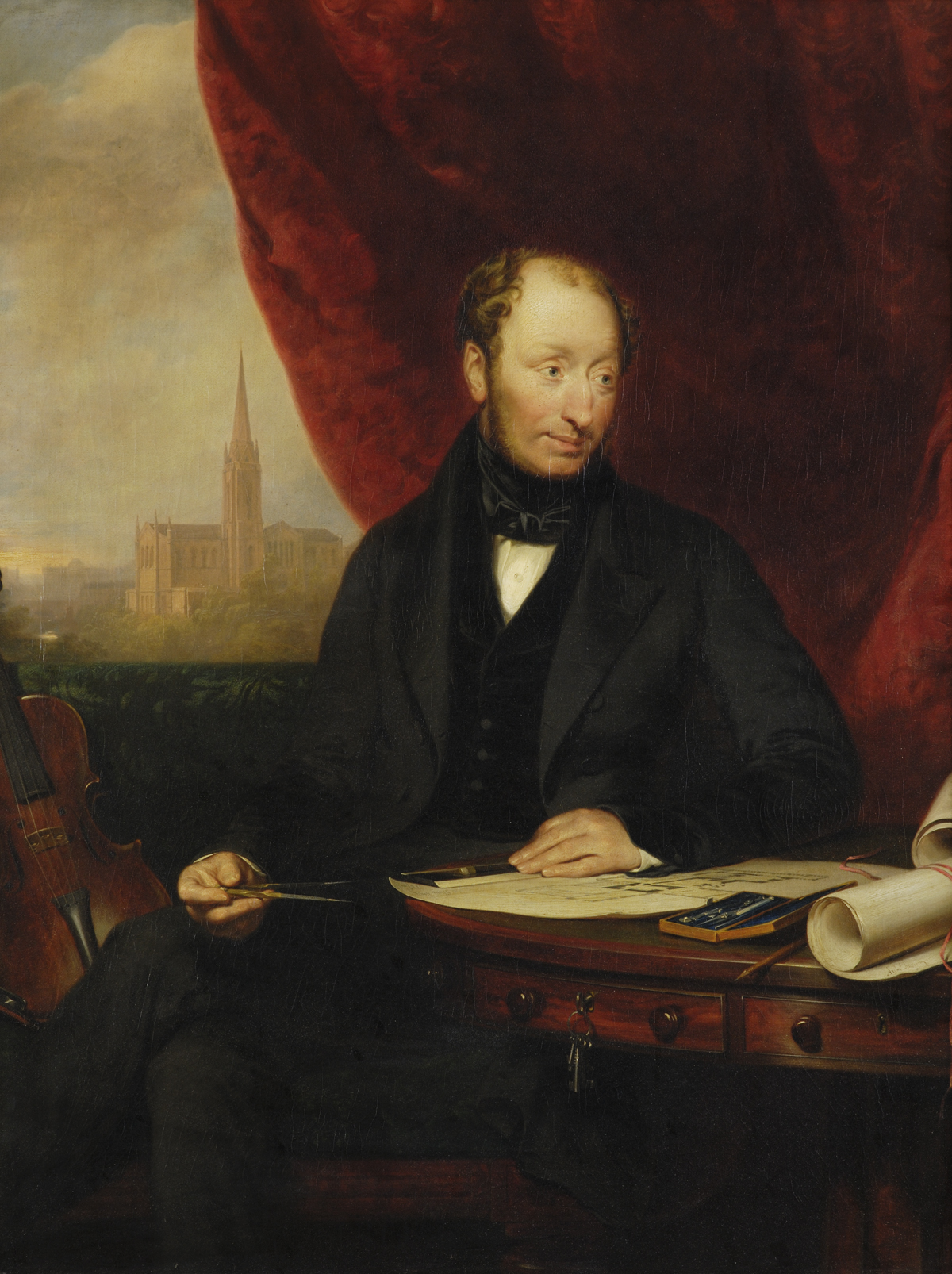
Archibald Simpson

- date unknown
  - John Beswicke, Australian architect and surveyor (died 1925)
  - Alexandru Săvulescu, Romanian architect (died 1902)

== Deaths ==
- March 23 – Archibald Simpson, Scottish architect practicing in Aberdeen (born 1790)
- October 13 – Lewis Nockalls Cottingham, English architect, pioneer in the study of Medieval Gothic architecture (born 1787)
- November 26 – Harvey Lonsdale Elmes, English architect, designer of St George's Hall, Liverpool (born 1814; consumption)
