= Lucien Baudens =

French military surgeon

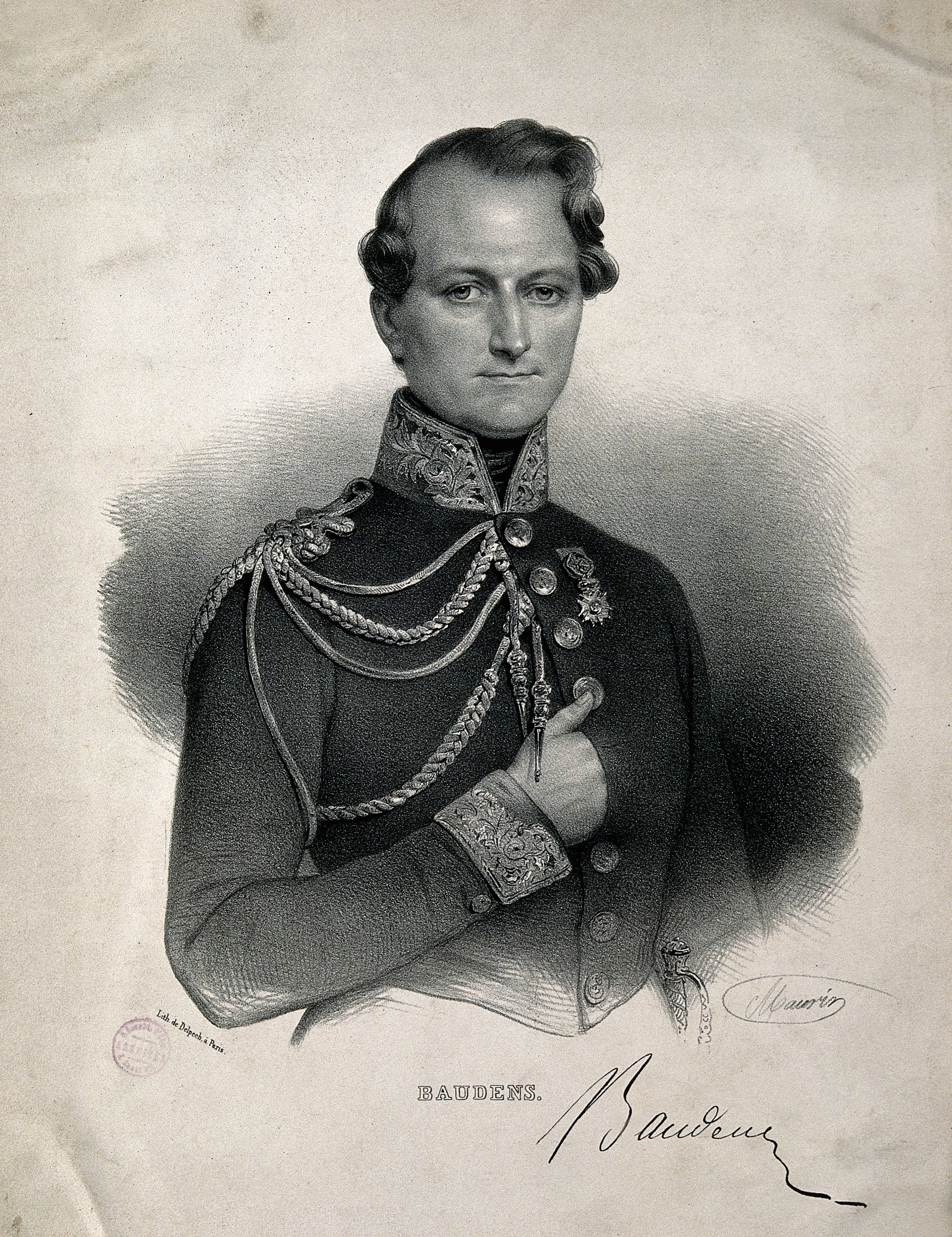
Lucien Baudens; lithograph by N. E. Maurin

Lucien Jean-Baptiste Baudens (3 April 1804 – 27 December 1857) was a French military surgeon.

== Biography ==
He was born in Aire-sur-la-Lys in the northern France from Jean-Louis Baudens, sheet merchant, and Marie-Adélaïde Baelen at the end of the Consulate and one month before the First Empire of Napoleon (18 May 1804).

After studying medicine at the French Defence Health service of the University of Strasbourg, then in Paris (Val-de-Grâce military hospital), he was granted his M.D. in 1829. He participated to the French conquest of Algeria from the invasion of Algiers in 1830, then of Constantine, Médéa, Mascara, Tlemcen, Milianah with the general Pierre Berthezène. He served in the African Army for ten years and was commended eight times in the army corps order. He was made Knight of the Legion of Honour in 1831 and Officer in 1835.

In 1832, he had the French military hospital moved from Turkish Caratine barracks to the Hussein Dey's country house, and transformed it in military training hospital then in military medicine school. In 1836, the hospital closed and Baudens left the country. He was appointed professor in Lille then in Val-de-Grâce military hospital. In 1852, he was appointed Physician General Inspector.

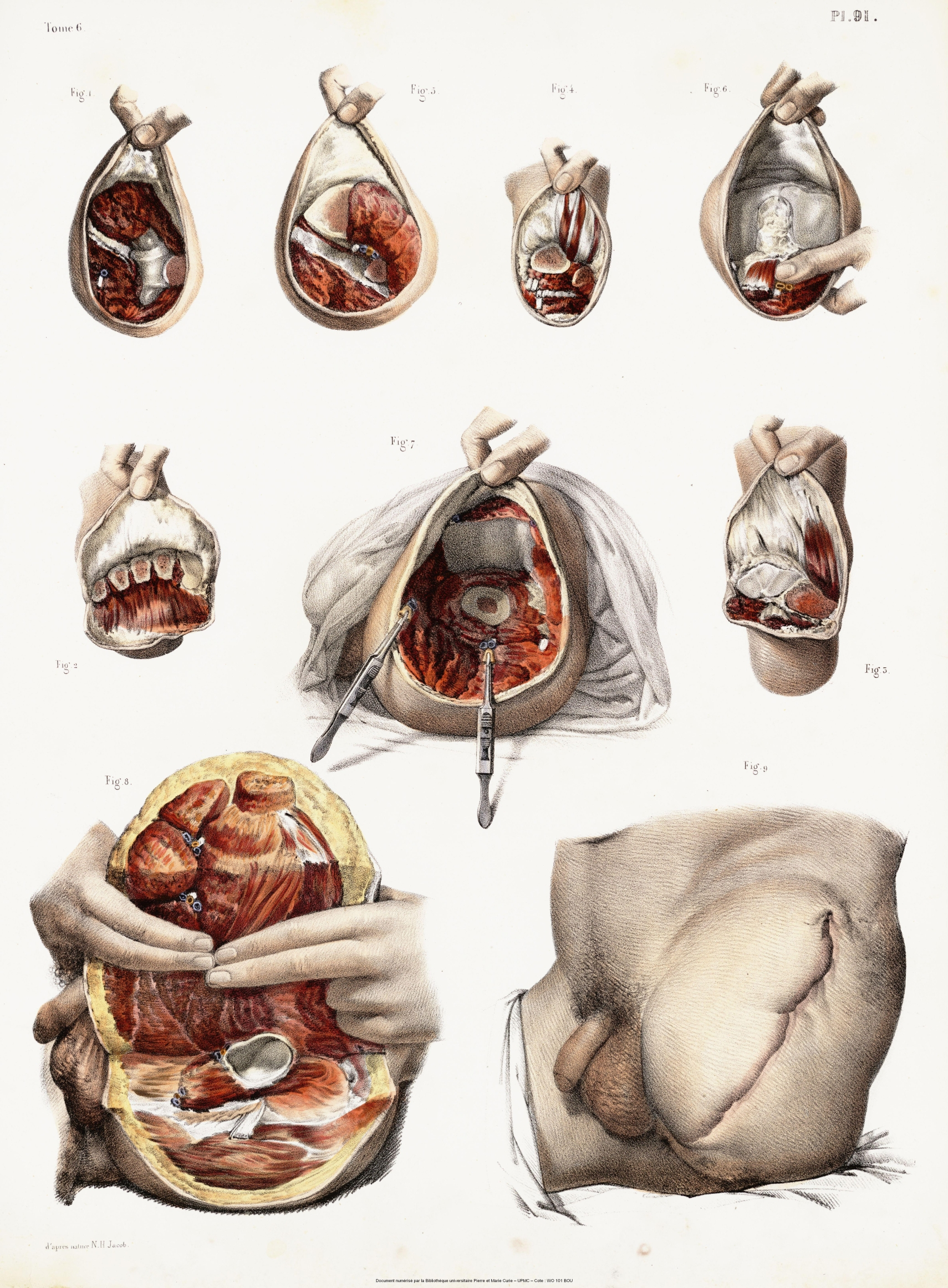
Amputations by Baudens.

As early as 1837, he insisted on the double experience necessary for a military surgeon: at the same time on the battlefield then in hospital. He was a defender of early amputations, accomplished with a true parage of regularization, the most distal possible to keep length and flaps suffisant for future equipment. It is a current recommendation for the realization of amputations in war traumatology and which is necessary for a functional equipment. He was the first to describe "the concept of circumferential wiring for mandibular fracture".

In 1853, in the French Academy of Sciences, he laid out the basic principles and rules of conduct that ensure good use of chloroform and considered this drug as the most effective and successful in military surgery.

He was sent on mission as expert during the Crimean War in 1855 by Marshal Vaillant. His mission was to inspect Army medical services and to report on the condition of military hospitals and ambulances. On site, he helped wounded and ill soldiers by taking forward measures against Service Corps and separated wounded and soldiers suffering from typhus. He was impressed by the work of the Daughters of Charity of Saint Vincent de Paul, of the Russian Sisters of the Exaltation of the Cross and specially of Florence Nightingale.

This frail young woman [...] embraced in her solicitude the sick of three armies.

— Lucien Baudens, La guerre de Crimée, les campements, les abris, les ambulances, les hôpitaux , p.104

He noted that in Pera, 42 officers died of illness on 46 dead officers. He wrote about French physicians and stretcher-bearers helping 8,000 wounded Russian soldiers remained on the battlefield after the battle of the Chernaya on 16 August 1855. But their comrades, failing to understand this initiative, attacked them with artillery. So he suggested a common distinctive sign must be carried by all health staff as identical as possible for all Armies but this proposal was not taken up and his idea was forgotten.

He reported that chloroform had been successfully used in more than 25,000 wounded (over 8% of the total force).

Himself fell ill with typhus and back in Paris, he died on 27 December 1857, aged 53.

== Works ==
- Cystotomie suspubienne, réduite à son plus haut degré de simplicité par un nouveau procédé opératoire. Paris. April 15, 1829..
- Clinique des plaies d'armes à feu. Paris: Jean-Baptiste Baillière. 1836..
- Leçons sur le strabisme et le bégaiement, faites à l'hôpital militaire du Gros-Caillou (in French). Paris: Germer Baillière. 1841..
- Relation historique de l'expédition de Tagdempt (in French). Paris: Germer-Baillière. 1841..
- Nouvelle méthode des amputations - Premier mémoire, amputation tibio-tarsienne (in French). Paris: Germer-Baillière. 1842..
- Discours prononcé le 25 septembre 1843 à la distribution des prix de l'hôpital militaire de perfectionnement au Val-de-Grâce (in French). Batignolles: Hennuyer et Turpin. 1843..
- Mémoire sur un nouveau traitement de l'hydrocèle : Lu à l'Académie des sciences le 9 décembre 1850. Paris: Thunot et Cie. 1851.
- Des règles à suivre dans l'emploi du chloroforme. Paris: Au bureau du Moniteur des hôpitaux. 1853..
- Mémoire sur les solutions de continuité de la rotule - Description d'un appareil curatif nouveau pour le traitement des fractures transversales. Paris: Germer-Baillière. 1853..
- Efficacité de la glace combinée à la compression pour réduire les hernies étranglées et combattre la péritonite consécutive (in French). Paris: Plon frères. 1854..
- Des fractures du membre pelvien, traitées à l'aide de l'appareil de M. Baudens. Paris: Plon frères. 1854..
- Souvenirs d'une mission médicale à l'armée d'Orient (in French). Paris: Jules Claye. 1857..
- La Guerre de Crimée. Les campements, les bris, les ambulances, les hôpitaux, etc (in French). Paris: Michel Lévy frères. 1858..

== Honours ==
- Commander of Legion of Honour (August 11, 1855).
- Great Officer of Order of the Medjidie.
- Member of the Defence Health Council.
- The Bourges military hospital, closed in 1997, was named after him.
- A bust realized by the artist Philippe Poitevin is in the Paris Army's Health Service Museum.
