= Velaux =

Commune in Provence-Alpes-Côte d'Azur, France

- Commune
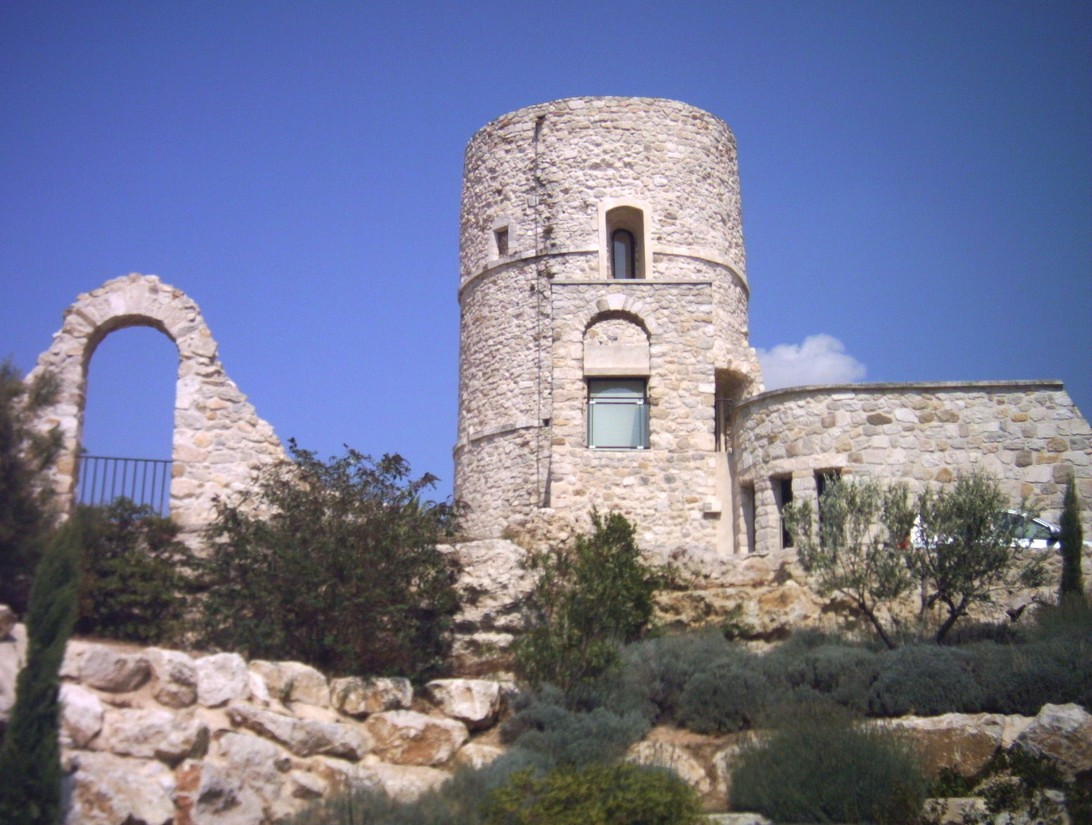
- A view of the old village of Velaux

- Coat of arms
- Location of Velaux
- Location within France Location within Provence-Alpes-Côte d'Azur
- Coordinates: 43°31′43″N 5°15′23″E
- Country: France
- Region: Provence-Alpes-Côte d'Azur
- Department: Bouches-du-Rhône
- Arrondissement: Aix-en-Provence
- Canton: Berre-l'Étang
- Intercommunality: Aix-Marseille-Provence

Government
  - Mayor (2026–32): Yannick Guérin
- Area^{1}: 25.23 km^{2} (9.74 sq mi)
- Elevation: 115 m (377 ft)
- Highest elevation: 270 m (890 ft)
- Lowest elevation: 27 m (89 ft)
- Population (2023): 8,941
  - Density: 354.4/km^{2} (917.8/sq mi)
- Demonym(s): Velauxien (masculine); Velauxienne (feminine)
- Time zone: UTC+01:00 (CET)
  - Summer (DST): UTC+02:00 (CEST)
- INSEE/Postal code: 13112 /13880
- ^{1} French Land Register data, which excludes lakes, ponds, glaciers > 1 km^{2} (0.386 sq mi or 247 acres) and river estuaries.

Velaux (French pronunciation: [vəlo]; Occitan: Velaurs) is a commune in the Bouches-du-Rhône department in southern France. It is near Coudoux and Ventabren.

Velaux is an old Provençal village set on a hill overlooking the high plains of the inland west side of Aix. It is located in the middle of the Aix-Marseille-Salon region and is surrounded by greenery and vine-covered hills. Velaux is in the countryside while being close to major urban centers in the region.

== Population ==
Historical population

Year	Pop.	±% p.a.
1793	954	—
1800	1,102	+2.08%
1806	1,054	−0.74%
1821	1,257	+1.18%
1831	1,242	−0.12%
1836	1,176	−1.09%
1841	1,183	+0.12%
1846	1,173	−0.17%
1851	1,024	−2.68%
1856	1,170	+2.70%
1861	1,061	−1.94%
1866	1,120	+1.09%
1872	1,150	+0.44%
1876	1,014	−3.10%
1881	849	−3.49%
1886	772	−1.88%
1891	781	+0.23%
1896	789	+0.20%
1901	789	+0.00%

Year	Pop.	±% p.a.
1906	748	−1.06%
1911	689	−1.63%
1921	684	−0.07%
1926	719	+1.00%
1931	792	+1.95%
1936	737	−1.43%
1946	753	+0.22%
1954	1,006	+3.69%
1962	1,360	+3.84%
1968	1,690	+3.69%
1975	2,638	+6.57%
1982	5,447	+10.91%
1990	7,265	+3.67%
1999	7,603	+0.51%
2007	8,305	+1.11%
2012	8,664	+0.85%
2017	8,689	+0.06%
2023	8,941	+0.48%

Source: EHESS and INSEE (1968-2023)

== Sights ==
- Église paroissiale
- Tour-musée de Velaux
- Moulin Segneurial
- Le site archéologique de Roquepertuse
- Ciné-club (CCDV)

== Sport ==
The local football club in Velaux is called US Velaux. It was founded in 1961, and the senior men's team competes in the tenth tier of French football.

== See also ==
- Communes of the Bouches-du-Rhône department
