= Maximin-Dominique Consolat =

French politician

Maximim-Dominique Consolat
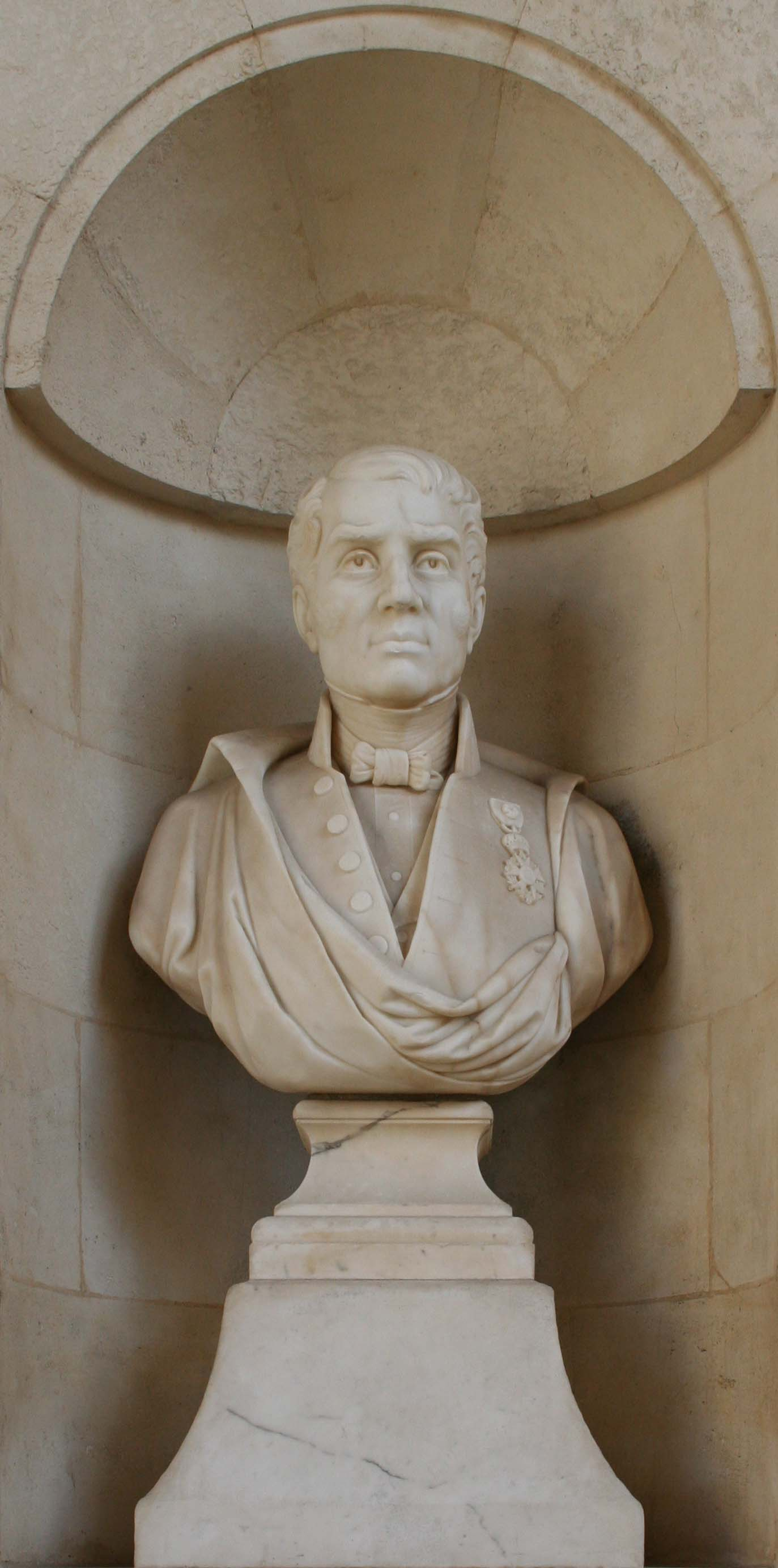
- Bust by sculptor Philippe Poitevin in the Palais Longchamp
- Born: 4 August 1785; Grasse, Var, France
- Died: 29 July 1858 (aged 72)
- Occupations: Businessman, politician

Maximin-Dominique Consolat (French: [maksimɛ̃ dɔminik kɔ̃sɔla]; 1785-1858) was a French politician. He worked for his family business in the Russian Empire for twenty-three years. Upon returning to France, he served as the Mayor of Marseille from 1831 to 1843.

== Biography ==
=== Early life ===
Maximim-Dominique Consolat was born on 4 August 1785 in Le Bar-sur-Loup, Var, France. He was educated in Draguignan, where he was a very good student in mathematics.

His three uncles worked as merchants in Saint Petersburg, Russia, where they had established the first Franco-Russian trading operation to date.

=== Career ===
In 1800, at the age of fifteen, Consolat moved to Russia, where he worked for his uncles. Shortly after, he served on the Board of Directors of their company. He worked for the family business in Russia for twenty-three years, until 1823.

In 1830, he became postmaster in Marseille. Later that year, he served as Deputy Mayor, while Joseph Alexis Rostand was Mayor. On 12 September 1831 he was appointed as Mayor, serving until 1843. He oversaw relief efforts in Marseille during the epidemics of cholera of 1834 and 1835. In 1834, he paved the way for the Canal de Marseille and the construction of the Roquefavour Aqueduct. He was replaced by André Raynard in 1843.

He became a Knight of the Legion of Honor in 1832 and an Officer in 1834.

=== Personal life ===
He married one of his cousins in the 1820s. He was a practicing Roman Catholic. He received treatments for his recurring stomach upsets in Vichy.

=== Death ===
He died on 29 July 1858 of stomach upset.
