= Coudoux =

Commune in Provence-Alpes-Côte d'Azur, France

- Commune
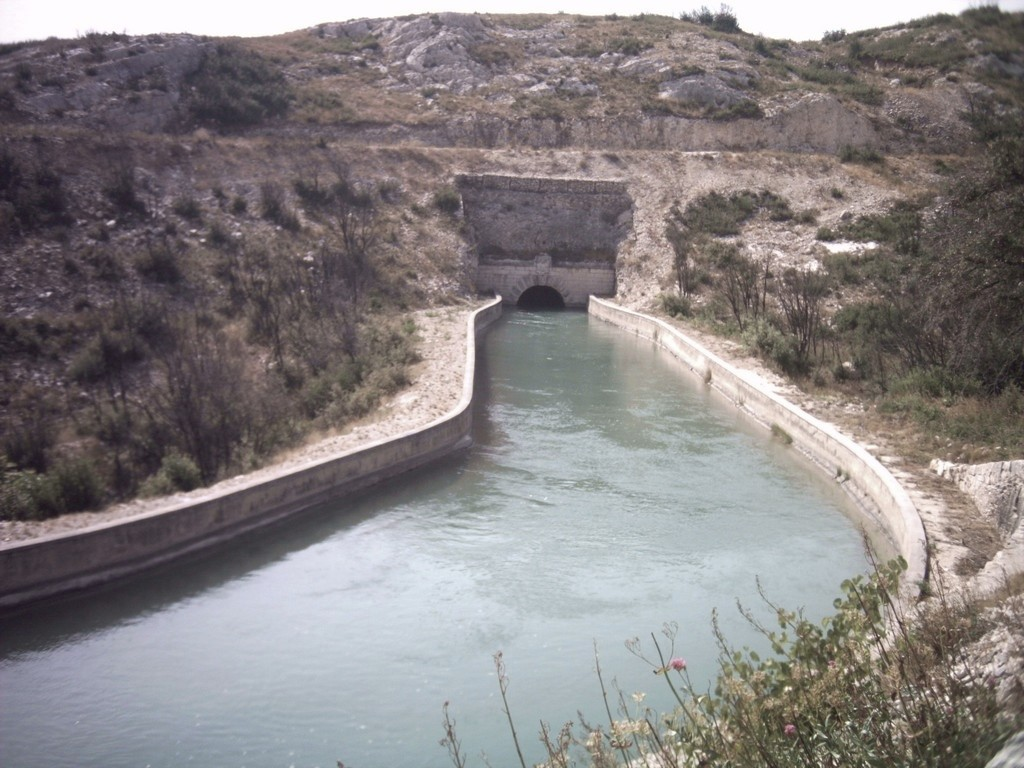
- The Canal de Marseille enters a tunnel near Coudoux

- Coat of arms
- Location of Coudoux
- Location within France Location within Provence-Alpes-Côte d'Azur
- Coordinates: 43°33′31″N 5°14′57″E
- Country: France
- Region: Provence-Alpes-Côte d'Azur
- Department: Bouches-du-Rhône
- Arrondissement: Aix-en-Provence
- Canton: Berre-l'Étang
- Intercommunality: Aix-Marseille-Provence

Government
  - Mayor (2026–32): Guy Barret
- Area^{1}: 12.65 km^{2} (4.88 sq mi)
- Elevation: 103 m (338 ft)
- Highest elevation: 277 m (909 ft)
- Lowest elevation: 40 m (130 ft)
- Population (2023): 3,825
  - Density: 302.4/km^{2} (783.1/sq mi)
- Time zone: UTC+01:00 (CET)
  - Summer (DST): UTC+02:00 (CEST)
- INSEE/Postal code: 13118 /13111
- ^{1} French Land Register data, which excludes lakes, ponds, glaciers > 1 km^{2} (0.386 sq mi or 247 acres) and river estuaries.

Coudoux (French pronunciation: [kuduks]; Occitan: Codoç) is a commune in the Bouches-du-Rhône department in southern France.

== Location ==
It is 17 km (11 mi) away from Aix-en-Provence, 20 km (12 mi) away from Salon-de-Provence, and nearly 40 km (25 mi) away from Marseille. As for villages, it is 3 km (1.9 mi) away from Velaux, 4 km (2.5 mi) away from La Fare-les-Oliviers, 5 km (3.1 mi) away from Ventabren and about 10 km (6.2 mi) away from Éguilles.

== History ==
As early as the 16th century, there were two hamlets, "Petit Coudoux" (Small Coudoux) and "Grand Coudoux" (Big Coudoux). However, these were part of the commune of Ventabren and it was only in 1950 that Coudoux was made a commune in its own right.

== Population ==
Historical population

Year	Pop.	±% p.a.
1954	457	—
1962	579	+3.00%
1968	880	+7.23%
1975	1,042	+2.44%
1982	2,228	+11.47%
1990	2,360	+0.72%

Year	Pop.	±% p.a.
1999	2,868	+2.19%
2007	3,352	+1.97%
2012	3,470	+0.69%
2017	3,765	+1.65%
2023	3,825	+0.26%

Source: EHESS and INSEE (1968-2023)

== Sister Cities ==
Coudoux has been twinned with Owingen, Baden-Württemberg, Germany since 1991 and Baone, Padua, Italy since 2004.

== See also ==
- Communes of the Bouches-du-Rhône department
