= Philippe Poitevin =

French sculptor

Philippe Poitevin (21 January 1831 – 15 September 1907) was a French sculptor.

== Biography ==
Philippe Poitevin was a student of Joseph-Marius Ramus and Armand Toussaint. He began at the Salon of 1855 and produced mainly busts.

In 1854, he was hired to restore the friezes of the Palais des Tuileries in Paris. In 1856, he was hired to make 85 stone sculptures for the Lesdiguières Pavilion in the Louvre Palace. After a ten-year stay in Paris, he settled in Marseille.

He worked for the Palais Longchamp in Marseille where, in the main staircase of the Museum of Fine Arts, he produced two groups of two children carrying cartridges on which are engraved the names of artists Finssonius (Louis Finson) and Dandré-Bardon (Michel-François Dandré-Bardon), as well as four bronze medallions, on either side of the museum entrance doors, representing Georges Cuvier and Aristotle for the door of the natural history museum, Nicolas Poussin and Pierre Puget for that of the museum the fine Arts.

For the Longchamp Palace nymphaeum, he produced the bust of Maximin-Dominique Consolat which faces that of the engineer Jean François Mayor de Montricher, sculpted by André-Joseph Allar.

Philippe Poitevin also adorns the facade of the Palais des Arts de Marseille with the bust of Sesostris to represent the art of ancient Egypt, and that of Leo X to represent the Italian Renaissance.

== Public collections ==
- Marseille, Museum of Fine Arts :
  - The Ball Player, 1859, bronze statuette.
  - The Spinning Top Player, 1860, bronze statuette.
  - Daphnis et Chloé, 1875, marble group.
  - Portrait of the Artist's Wife, 1893, marble bust.
  - Young girl with a needle, marble.

== Gallery ==
Œuvres de Philippe Poitevin

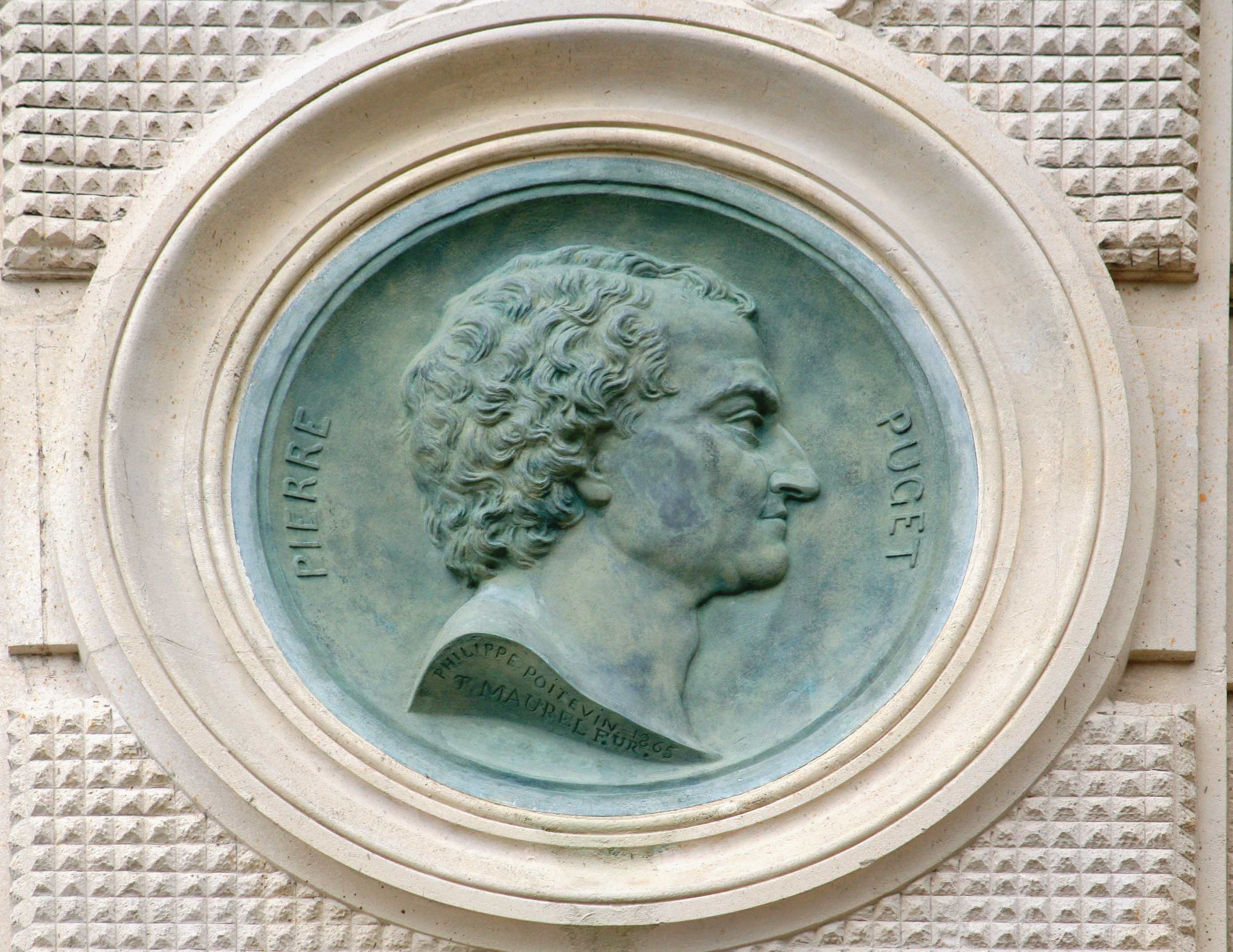
Pierre Puget, Marseille, Palais Longchamp

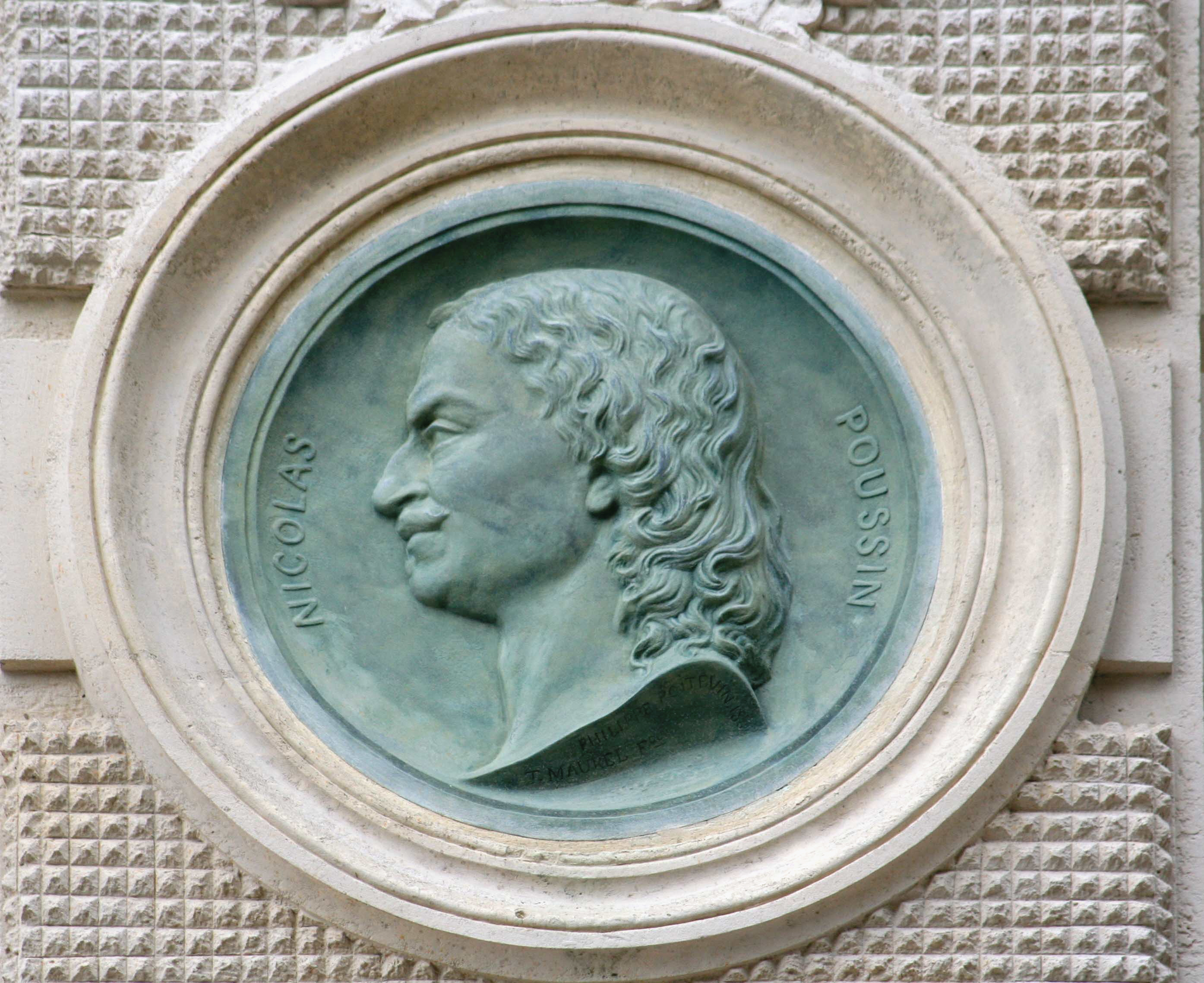
Nicolas Poussin, Marseille, Palais Longchamp

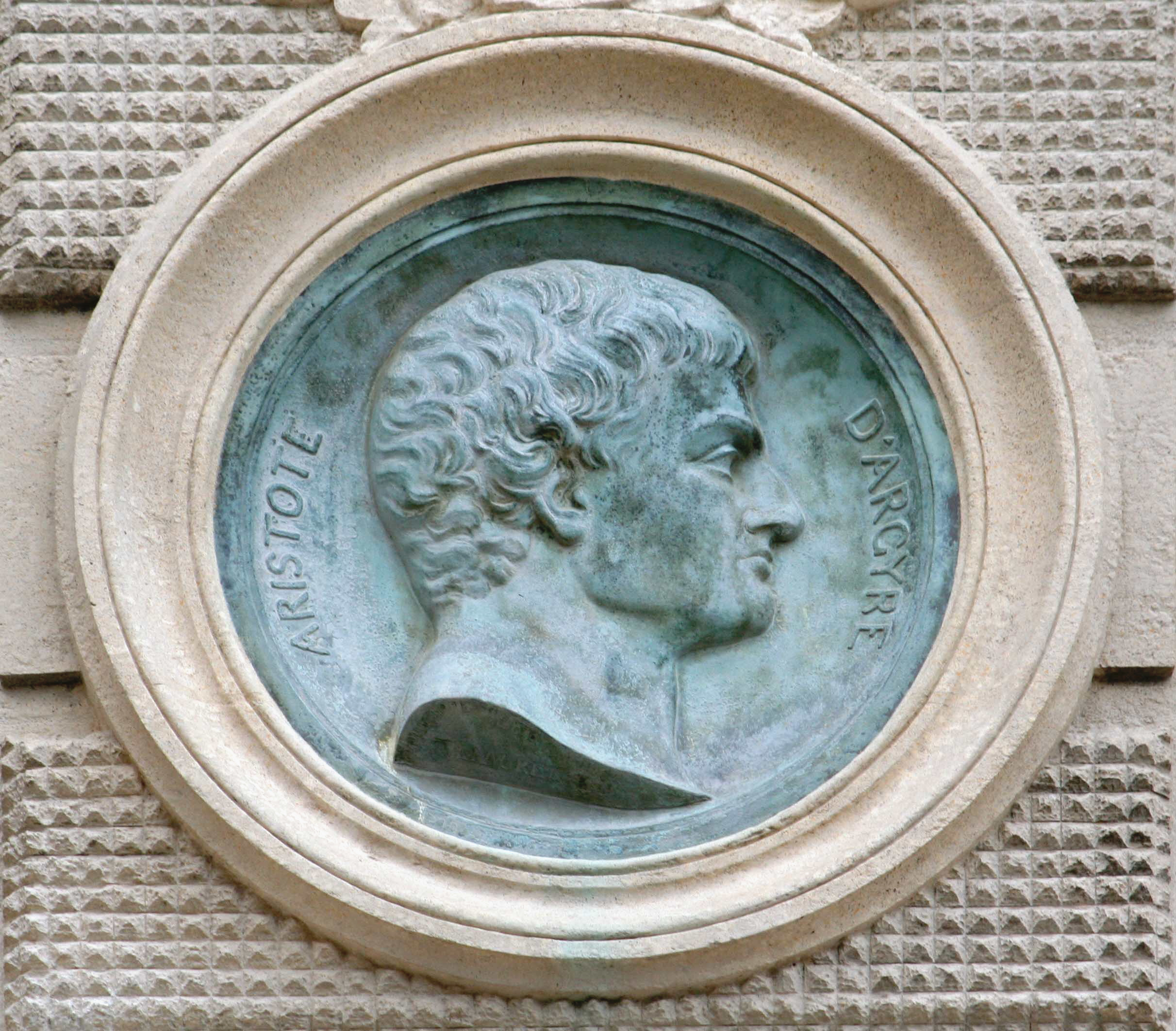
Aristote, Marseille, Palais Longchamp

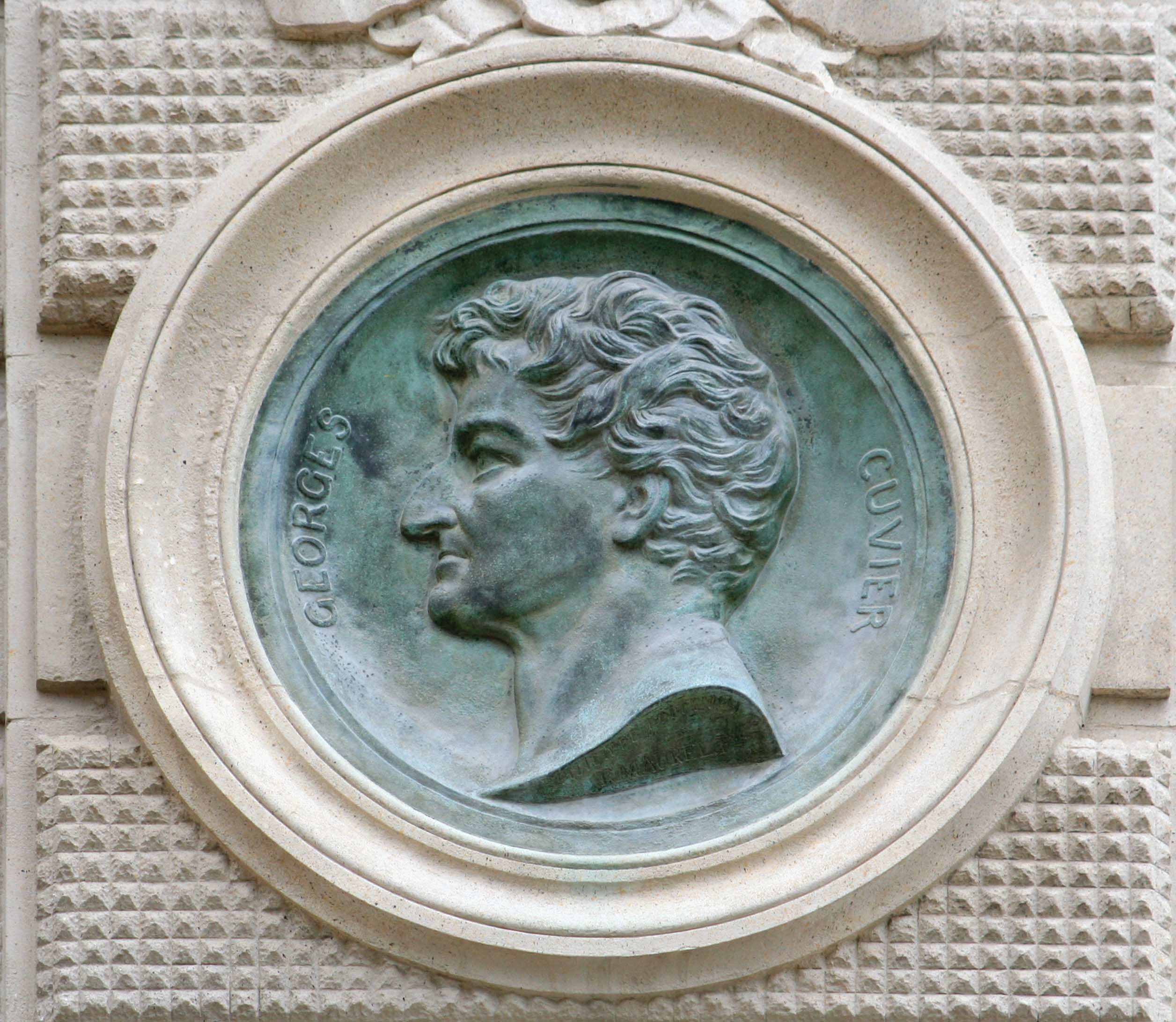
Georges Cuvier, Marseille, Palais Longchamp

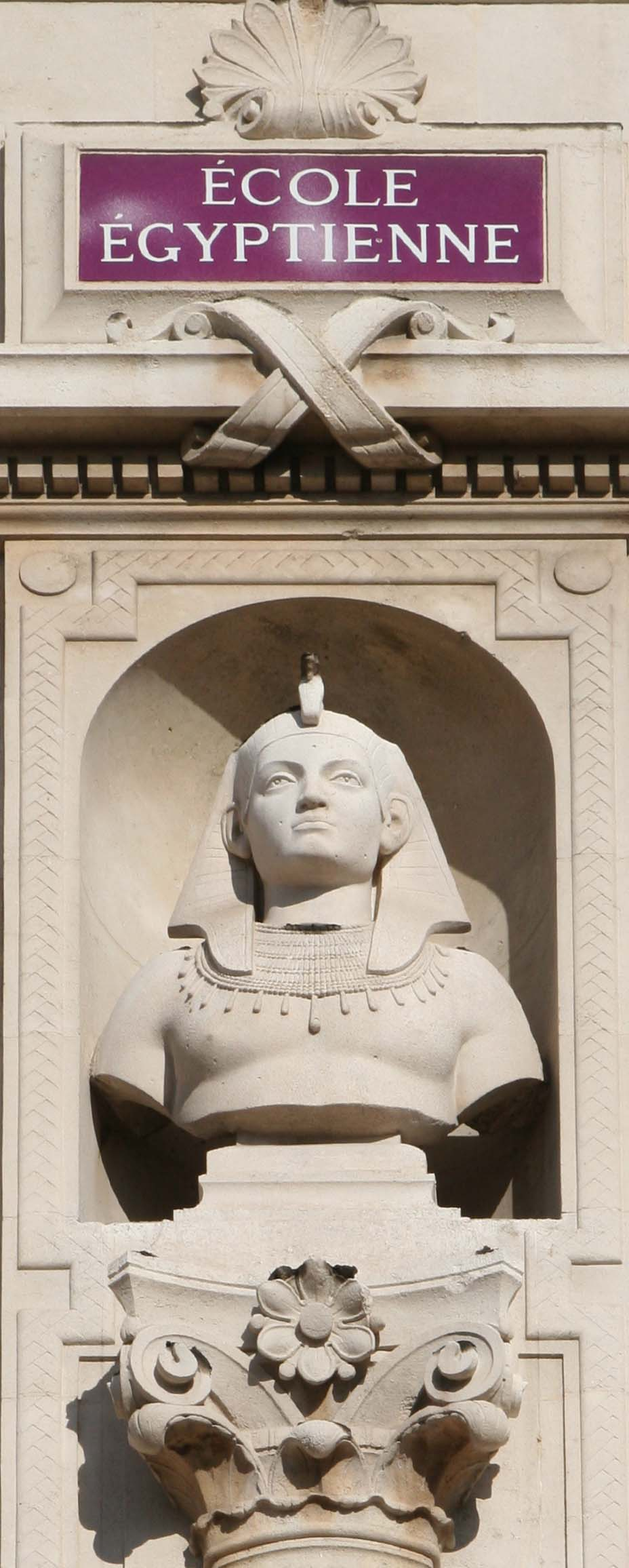
Sesostris, Palais des Arts - Marseille

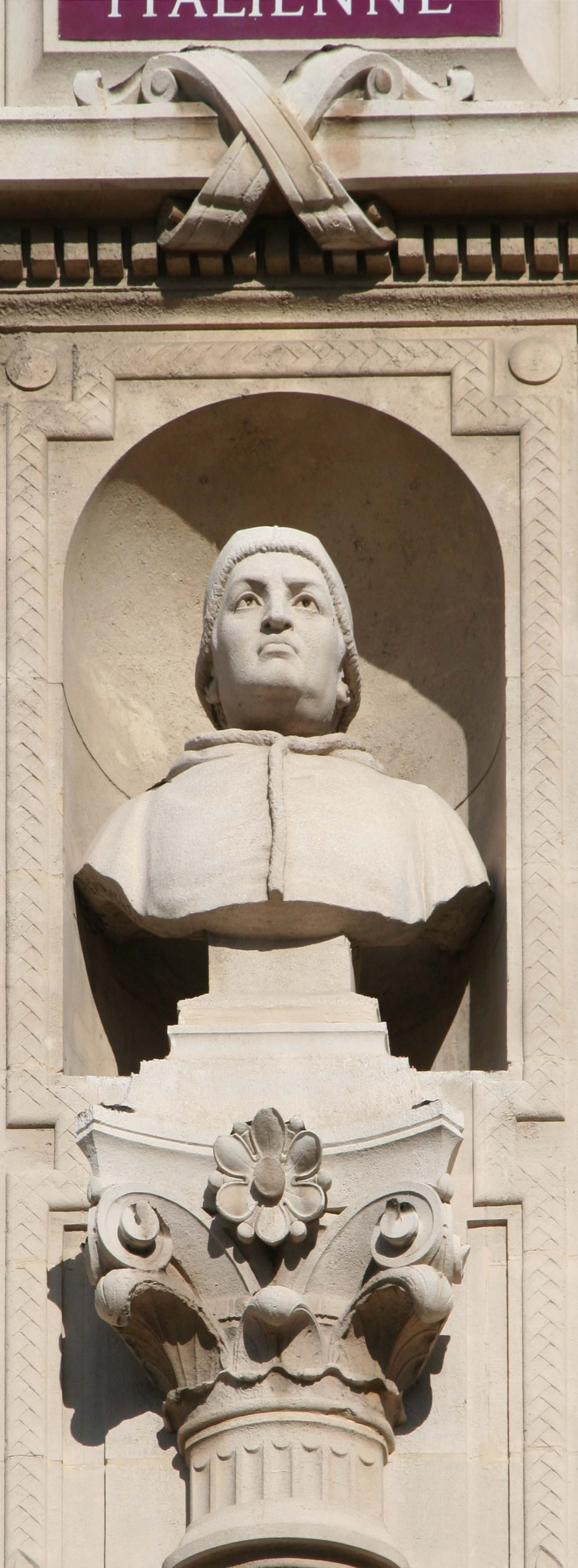
Leo X, Palais des Arts - Marseille

Click on images to enlarge

== Bibliography ==
- Noet, Laurent. "Philippe Poitevin". Marseille, ville sculptée 2..
- Alauzen, André; Noet, Laurent (2006). Dictionnaire des peintres et sculpteurs de Provence-Alpes-Côte d'Azur. Marseille: Jeanne Laffitte. ISBN 9782862764412..
