= Ventabren =

Commune in Provence-Alpes-Côte d'Azur, France

- Commune
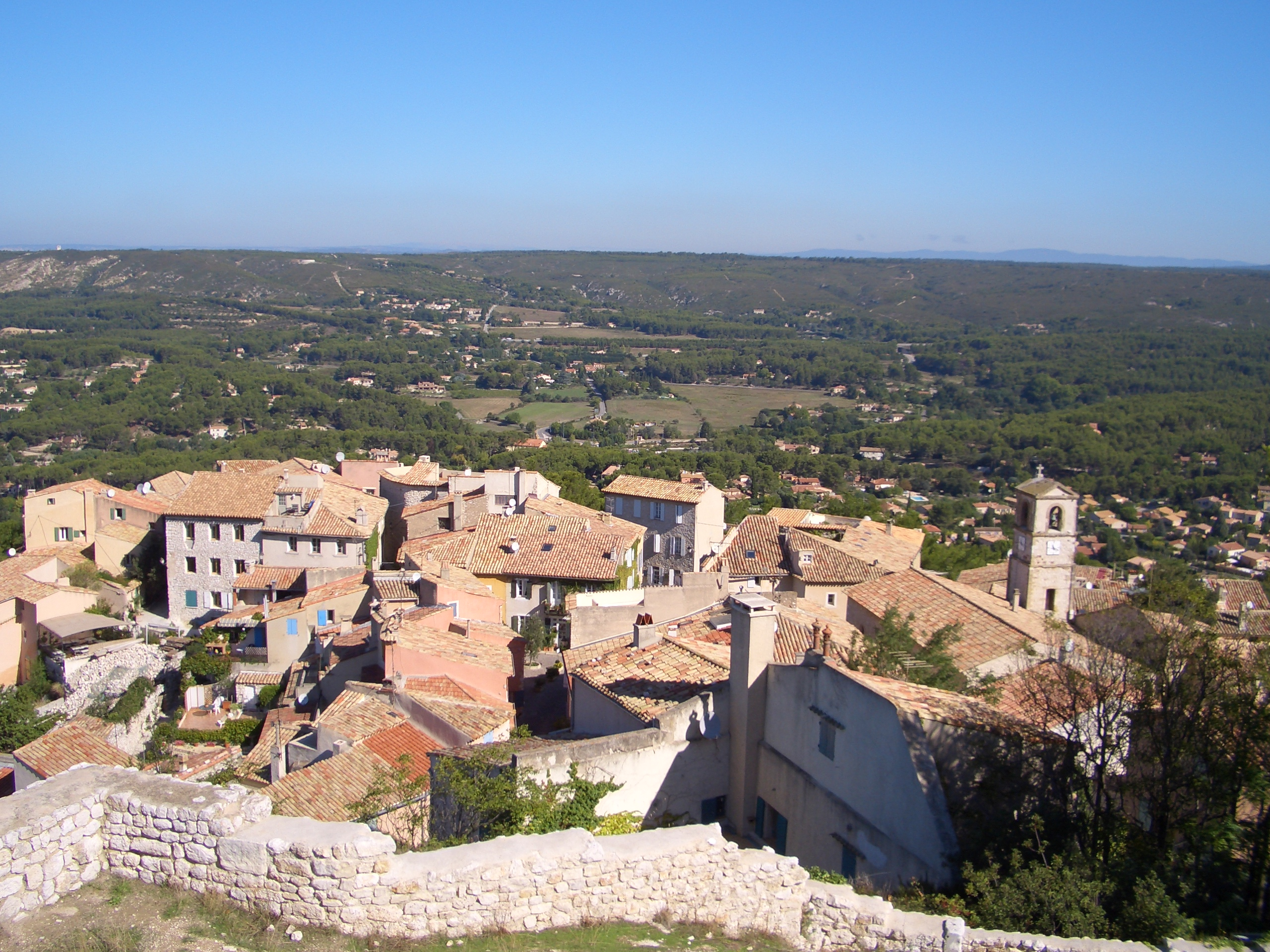
- A view of the town of Ventabren

- Coat of arms
- Location of Ventabren
- Location within France Location within Provence-Alpes-Côte d'Azur
- Coordinates: 43°32′17″N 5°17′35″E
- Country: France
- Region: Provence-Alpes-Côte d'Azur
- Department: Bouches-du-Rhône
- Arrondissement: Aix-en-Provence
- Canton: Berre-l'Étang
- Intercommunality: Aix-Marseille-Provence

Government
  - Mayor (2026–32): Frédéric Vigouroux
- Area^{1}: 28.5 km^{2} (11.0 sq mi)
- Elevation: 238 m (781 ft)
- Highest elevation: 286 m (938 ft)
- Lowest elevation: 59 m (194 ft)
- Population (2023): 5,839
  - Density: 205/km^{2} (531/sq mi)
- Time zone: UTC+01:00 (CET)
  - Summer (DST): UTC+02:00 (CEST)
- INSEE/Postal code: 13114 /13122
- ^{1} French Land Register data, which excludes lakes, ponds, glaciers > 1 km^{2} (0.386 sq mi or 247 acres) and river estuaries.

Ventabren (French pronunciation: [vɛ̃tabʁɛ̃]) is a commune in the Bouches-du-Rhône department in the Provence-Alpes-Côte d'Azur region in Southern France.

== Geography ==
The historical village of Ventabren is close to Aix-en-Provence (to the east), 6 km (3.7 mi) away from Coudoux and Velaux to the west.

== History ==
The village dates back to 920–940 AD, when Guillaume I, Count of Provence, had a castle built there.

In 1851 the village comprised 327 houses. Six years later, a railway was built.

The 393-metre long Roquefavour Aqueduct (Aqueduc de Roquefavour), located on the territory of the commune, was built from 1842 to 1847 to convey water from the Durance to Marseille, as part of the Canal de Marseille. It is the world's largest stone aqueduct.

== Demographics ==
Historical population

Year	Pop.	±% p.a.
1793	1,678	—
1800	960	−7.67%
1806	1,301	+5.20%
1821	1,408	+0.53%
1831	1,357	−0.37%
1836	1,309	−0.72%
1841	1,600	+4.10%
1846	1,844	+2.88%
1851	1,245	−7.56%
1856	1,290	+0.71%
1861	1,301	+0.17%
1866	1,151	−2.42%
1872	1,130	−0.31%
1876	1,121	−0.20%
1881	1,075	−0.83%
1886	1,015	−1.14%
1891	1,019	+0.08%
1896	1,011	−0.16%
1901	985	−0.52%

Year	Pop.	±% p.a.
1906	988	+0.06%
1911	889	−2.09%
1921	951	+0.68%
1926	896	−1.18%
1931	832	−1.47%
1936	787	−1.11%
1946	889	+1.23%
1954	509	−6.73%
1962	603	+2.14%
1968	934	+7.57%
1975	1,537	+7.38%
1982	2,717	+8.48%
1990	3,742	+4.08%
1999	4,552	+2.20%
2007	4,859	+0.82%
2012	4,646	−0.89%
2017	5,459	+3.28%
2023	5,839	+1.13%

Source: EHESS and INSEE (1968–2023)

== See also ==
- Communes of the Bouches-du-Rhône department
