= Marseille Canal =

Canal in Provence, France

Canal de Marseille
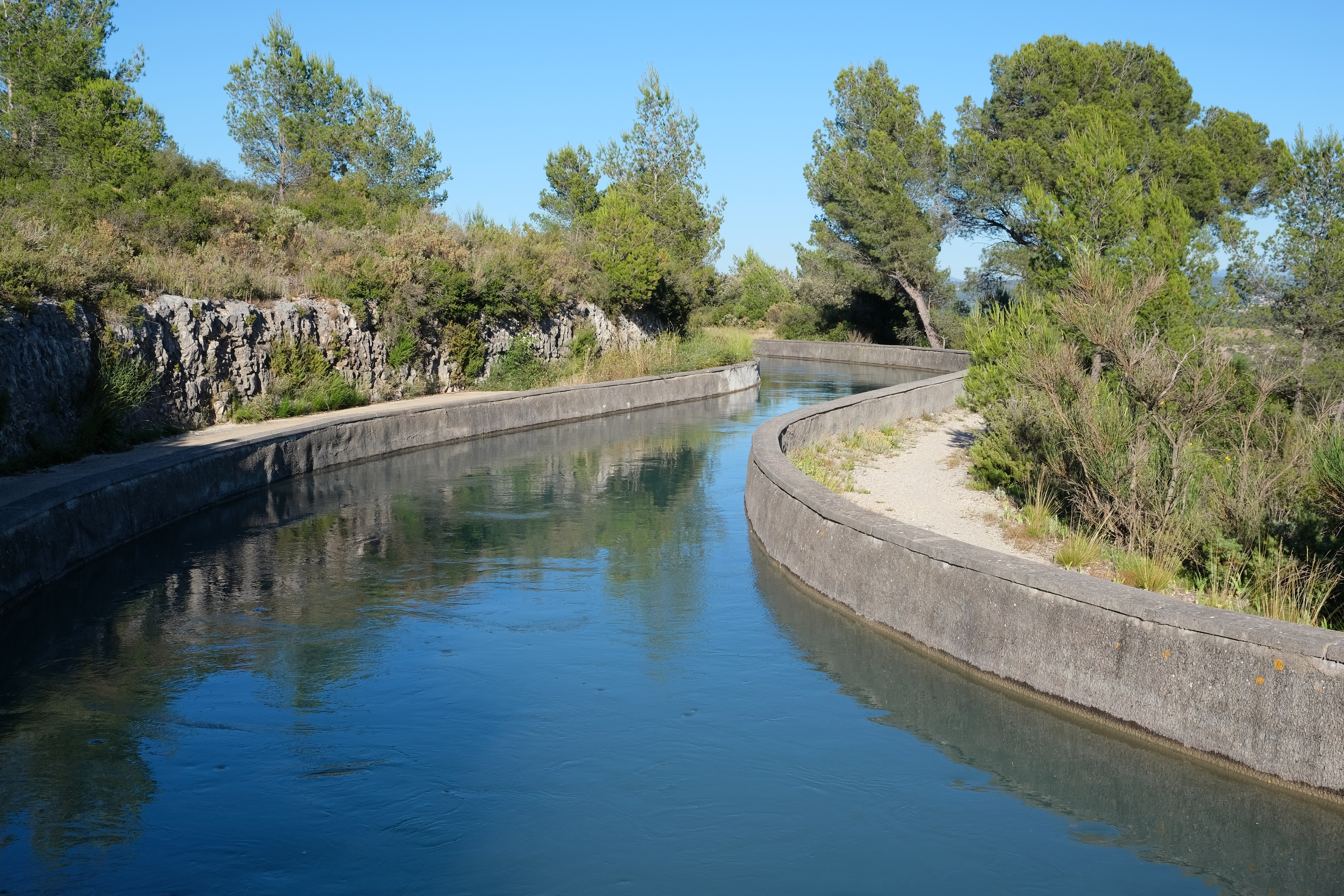
- The canal just before Roquefavour Aqueduct
- Interactive map of Canal de Marseille
- Country: France

Specifications
- Length: 80 km (50 miles)

Geography
- Direction: South
- Start point: Durance
- End point: the areas of Marseille
- Beginning coordinates: 43.691°N 5.386°E
- Ending coordinates: Various

The Canal de Marseille (French pronunciation: [kanal də maʁsɛj]; Occitan: Canal de Marselha) is a major source of drinking water for all of Marseille, the largest city in Provence, France. The canal, along its main artery, is 80 kilometres (50 mi) long and has additional 160 kilometres (99 mi) of minor arteries. Its construction lasted 15 years and was directed by the engineer Franz Mayor de Montricher. The canal became functional on July 8, 1849.

The canal was a significant achievement of 19th-century engineering, combining bridges, tunnels and reservoirs over mountainous terrain. Until 1970, it was almost the sole water source for Marseille, and it still provides two-thirds of the city's drinking water.

== History ==
Marseille is along the hilly Mediterranean seafront and is crossed only by the irregular Huveaune River and its tributary, the Jarret River. The waters were canalised in the 14th century but gradually became an open sewer. Water quality continued to decline, and distribution suffered because of the lack of maintenance of the network.

Since the river has only a small flow, droughts were devastating to the region. In 1834, the river nearly dried up completely, and only 1 litre (1 US qt) was available per person per day. In the 1830s, Marseille began to experience rapid population growth and an epidemic in 1832 to 1835 of cholera convinced the elected officials to act to restore health and to ensure enough water for the city.

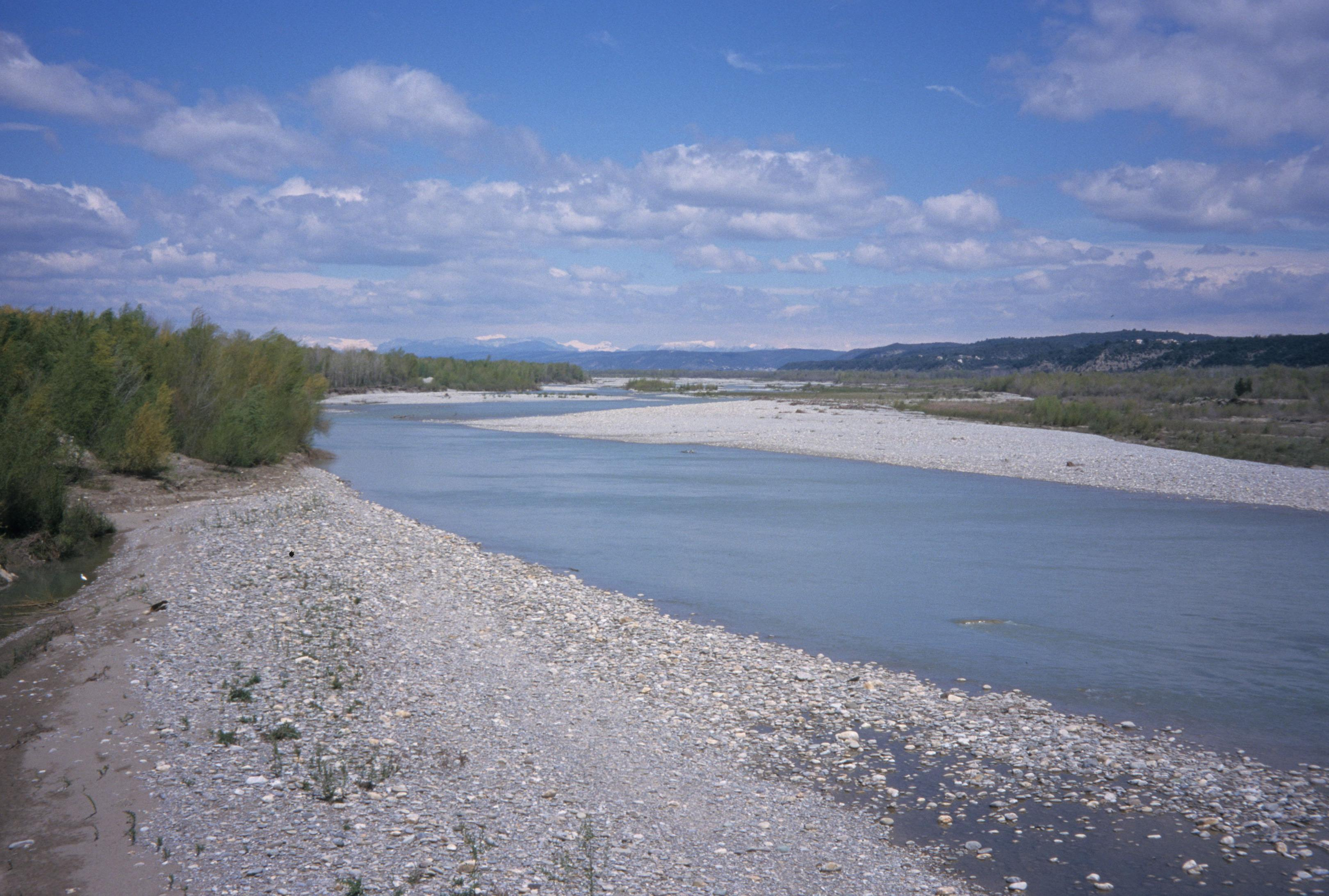
The river Durance near Manosque

This cholera epidemic caused the death of 100,000 people throughout France. Originally from Asia, the disease spread along the Ganges Valley in 1826 and the Caspian and Volga in 1829. In 1830, the disease overtook Moscow and Poland and, in 1833, Hamburg. In March 1832, cholera reached Paris, and 18,000 died, and the eipedemic killed many people in Haute-Provence. In July 1833, the epidemic reached Marseille. By December 1834, the death toll was 865, and by 1835, it was 2,500.

Fears were revived of the Great Plague of Marseille, just over a century earlier, which had caused around 100,000 deaths. In July 1833, a gathering of 30,000 residents in the city centre protested the poor sanitary conditions.

Maximin-Dominica Consolat, the city's mayor from 1832 to 1843, decided in 1834 to improve conditions "no matter what it costs." The decision was made to bring in water from the nearest large river, the Durance. However, the river was far and separated from the city by mountains (chaîne des Côtes, plateau de l'Arbois, massif de l'Étoile). The plan was to captured water from high up out of the Durance and gravity feed it over and through the terrain so that water would arrive in Marseille at the highest point of the city, Saint-Antoine (150 metres (492 ft)), thus allowing water to serve the whole city.

== Construction ==
The building of the canal took 15 years, from 1839 to 1854, and covered 80 kilometres (50 mi), of which 17 kilometres (11 mi) is underground. The canal also crosses 18 bridges.

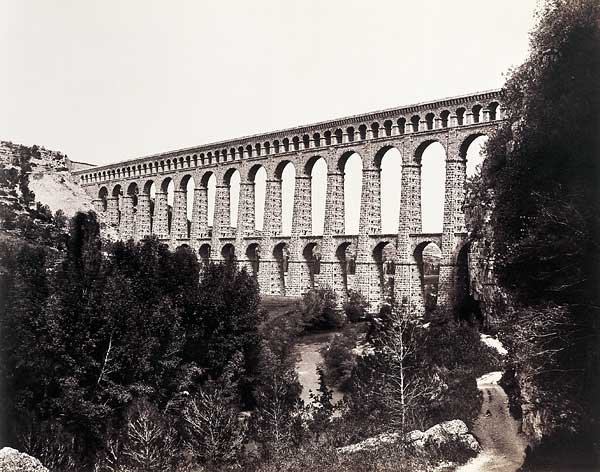
The Roquefavour Aqueduct, near Aix-en-Provence.

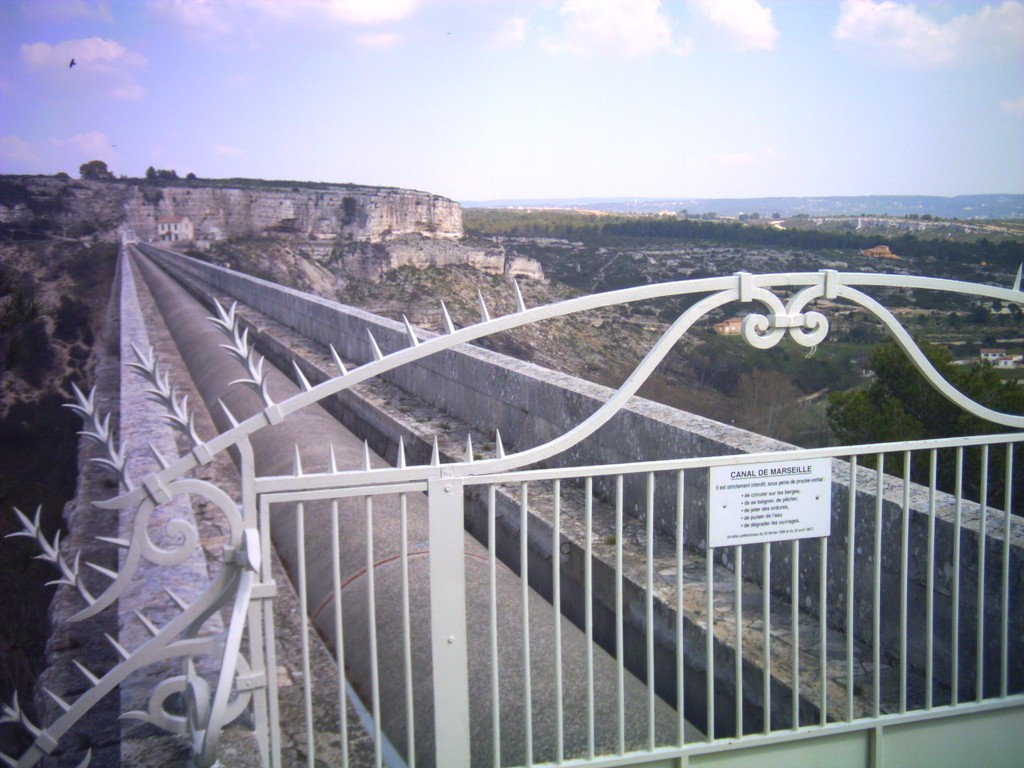
The canal crossing the Roquefavour Aqueduct.

A major challenge was passing the canal over the valley of the Arc, which has an altitude of less than 100 metres (328 ft) between Aix-en-Provence and the Etang de Berre. The project's chief engineer, Franz Mayor de Montricher, rejected the proposal of a bridge trap and decided instead to build an aqueduct where the escarpments on both sides of the valley were closest, at 400 metres (1,312 ft). That would become the Roquefavour Aqueduct at Ventabren, inspired by the Roman architectural work Pont du Gard. Since then, the Roquefavour Aqueduct, 393 metres (1,289 ft) long, has been regarded as one of the main tourist attractions of Aix-en-Provence.

The canal is mostly concrete, but some portions are made of stone or brick. The canal's flow is 10 cubic metres (10 kL) per second, and the slope is 0.36 metres (1.2 ft) per 1 kilometre (0.62 mi). The width at the top is 9.4 metres (31 ft), and the width at the basin is 3 metres (10 ft).

Water began flowing through the partly-finished canal on November 19, 1849 in Marseille. Between 1854 and 1869, 77 kilometres (48 mi) of pipes, tanks and basins were constructed, allowing access to water throughout Marseille and the neighboring communes of Plan-de-Cuques, Allauch and Aubagne.

Although the population increased over the next 40 years, citizens of Marseille in 1876 had over 30 times more water per capita than they did before the canal opened: 370 litres (98 US gal) for domestic use and 660 litres (174 US gal) for industrial activities, daily.

== Through Bouches-du-Rhône ==
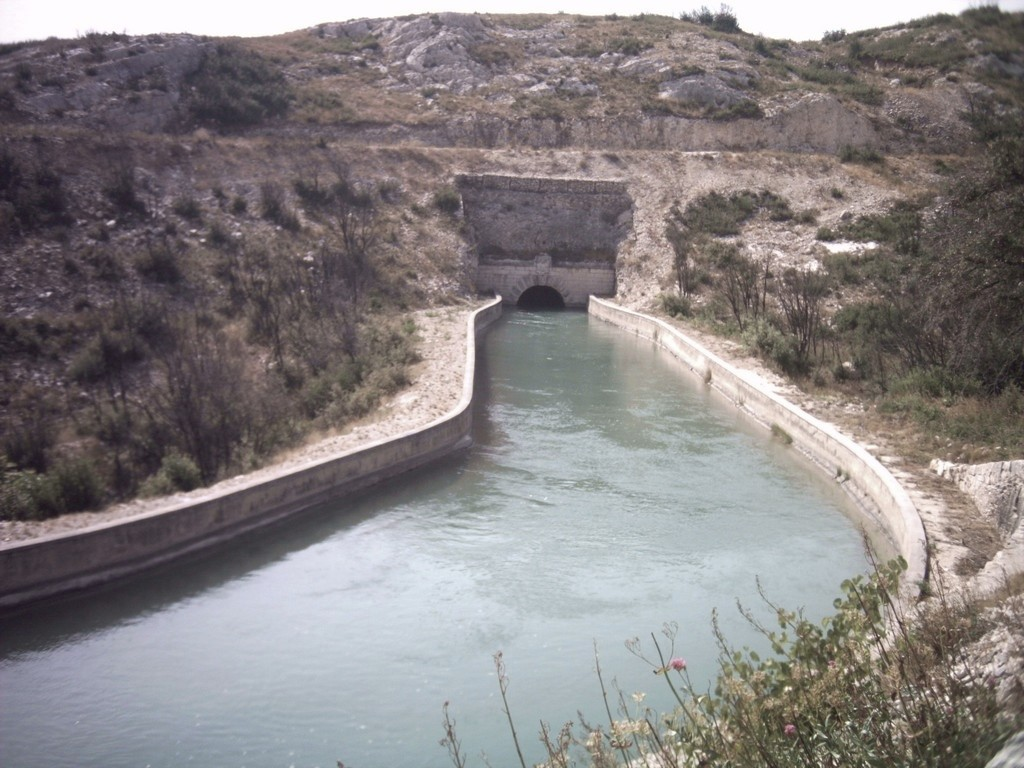
The canal entering a tunnel near Coudoux

The initial intake of the canal from the Durance was at the Pertuis Bridge in the Vaucluse at an elevation of 185 metres (607 ft) and 50 kilometres (31 mi) from Marseille. From there, the canal travelled west to Lew Puy-Sainte-Réparade and then northwest to Saint-Estève-Janson. This portion of the canal, now known as the Ancien Canal de Marseille, was abandoned when the Canal EDF de la Durance went into service in 1966. Since that time, water initially enters the canal at the hydroelectric station just northwest of Saint-Estève-Janson. The canal then continues northwest to the southern end of the Cadenet bridge, where it feeds the Retenue d'eau de Saint-Christophe.

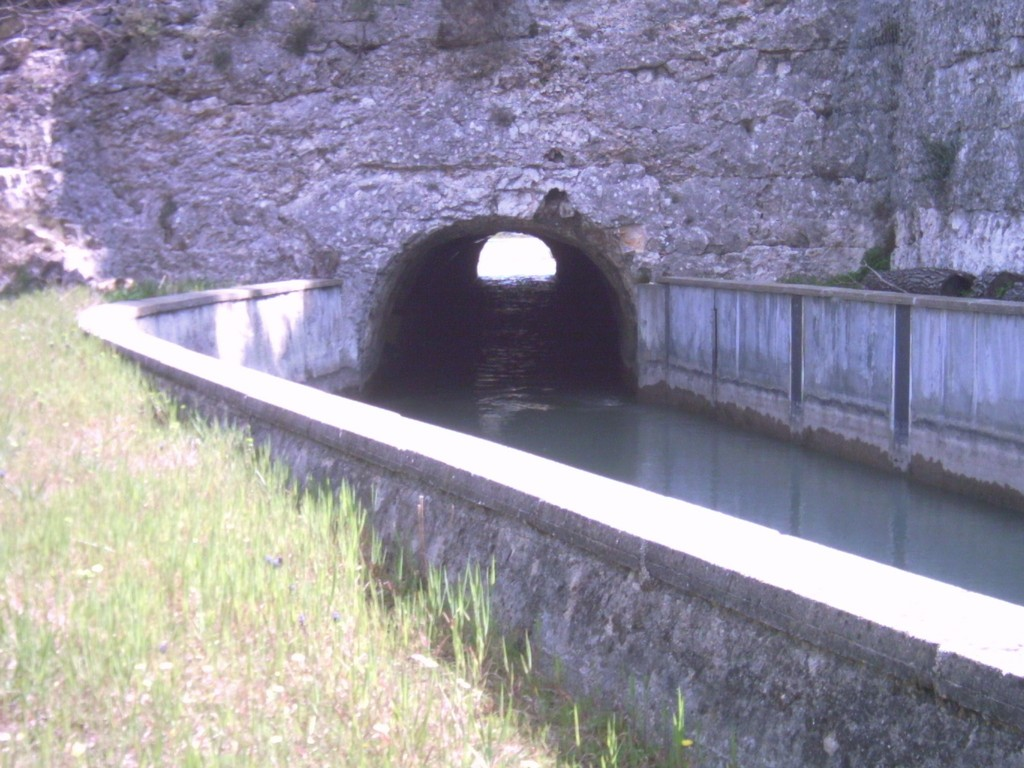
The canal underground.

The route then clings to the hills, passes above La Roque-d'Anthéron and Charleval, turns to the south and exits the Durance valley and EDF via a 3.7 km tunnel under the west end of the hills of the Chaîne des Côtes.

The canal emerges from the tunnel to the west of Lambesc, whereupon the canal's path becomes more complex. Many bridges and tunnels are required to travel the valleys on its way to Coudoux. The canal travels around the hill of Ventabren and comes to the River Arc, where it enters the Roquefavour Aqueduct. Near this area, the Paris-Marseille high speed railway line passes it, and the railway bridge structure has been designed to harmonize with the aqueduct.

From the aqueduct, the canal heads south, through many more tunnels, and feeds the Réservoir du Réaltor, a settling basin needed to clarify the Durance's silt-laden water. The canal then enters a 3.5 km tunnel south under Arbois plain, where it briefly emerges and passes thru a treatment plant at Les Giraudets. The canal then enters a second, 5.5 km tunnel which heads southeast and emerges at La Sevine in the 15th arrondissement of Marseille. From here the canal heads south and begins to splinter into many smaller canals which feed the city. One branch of the canal works its way completely around the eastern side of Marseille, turning south then west and finally ending at the Mediterranean at Mont Rose in Montredon in the 8th arrondissement of Marseille.

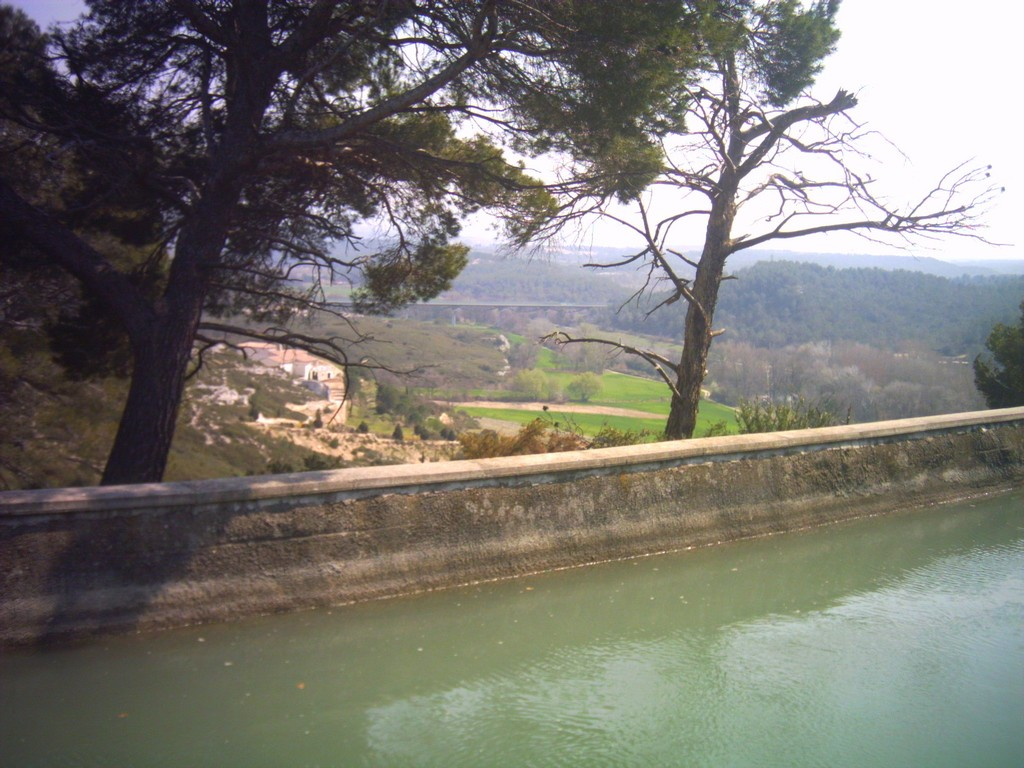
A TGV viaduct seen from the canal

== Present day ==
=== Water quality ===
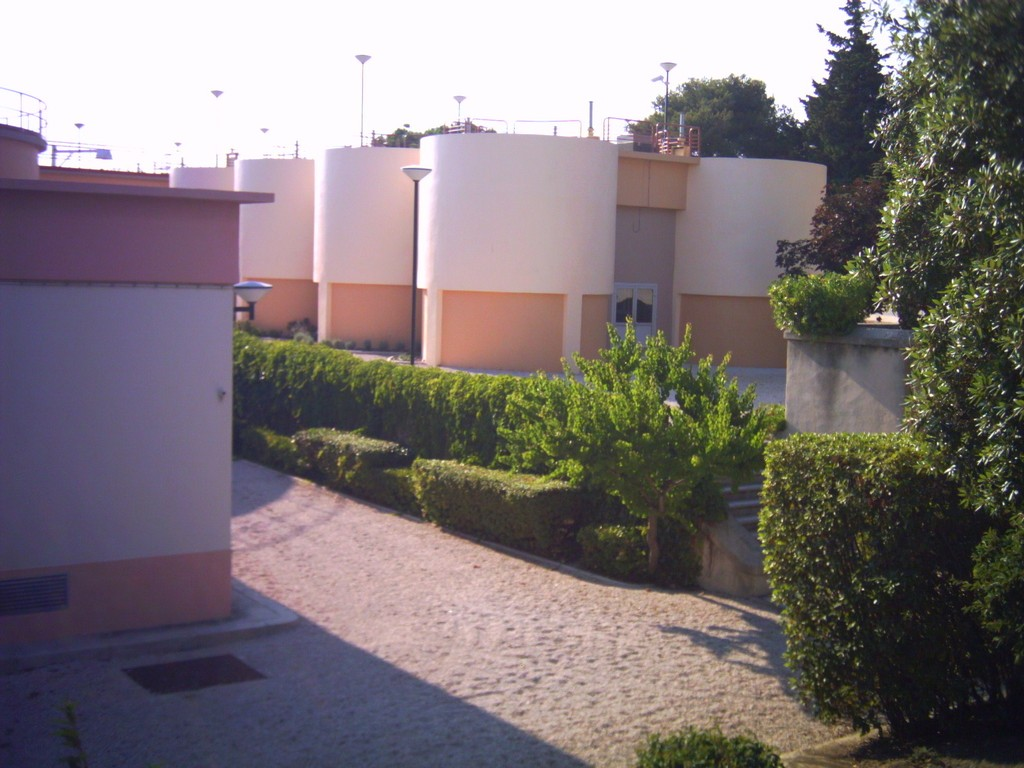
The water treatment plant, in Saint-Barnabé in the 12th arrondissement of Marseille.

The canal is no longer the sole water source for Marseille. The Canal de Provence, almost completely underground, is a network of canals from the Verdon River built in the 1970s that now brings water to not only Marseille but also Aix-en-Provence and Toulon. Today, that water is approximately two thirds of the water brought into Marseille, the remaining third comes from the Verdon through Provence. Both sources are connected.

The water is treated in two water treatment facilities, Sainte-Marthe and Saint-Barnabé. The main operations performed by the treatment facilities are pre-chlorination, clarification by flocculation with a coagulant, sand filtration and disinfection with ozone and chlorine. In 2006, the health authority of Marseille carried out a number of tests on the water quality, determining that the canal's water conformed to all required norms. In 2009, a young mother and her baby were found dead in their apartment. The culprit was chlorine gas from the water supply that led to a citywide survey of the gasses in the system, but not before others were admitted to hospitals from all over the city.

=== Administration ===
The canal was operated by the City of Marseille from 1849 to 1941. However, the destructive fire of the store "Nouvelles Galeries" in November 1938 in which 73 people died, the city government was put under trusteeship, and the operation of the canal was entrusted to the Société d’études des eaux de Marseille (SEEM) (English: Society for the study of the Marseille Water) and Raoul Dautry, who had assisted in the creation of the SNCF and was named the first president.

Since then, SEEM, owned equally by Veolia Environnement and Lyonnais des eaux, has controlled the canal's operation.

=== Support and maintenance ===
Upon entering the treatment facility at Sainte-Marthe in the 14th arrondissement, the canal water is filtered at the bassin du Merlan before it exits the structure to enter the distribution network of Marseille. However, the canal is for more than sanitary purposes. Historically, the structure assisted in irrigating fields for farmers and gardeners and greatly boosted the growth of gardening in the area.

The canal's offshoot irrigation ditches are controlled by the aygadiers, who have the right to cross private property ito assist in the repair and operation of the canal. The focus of SEEM and the aygadiers has recently been on centring the use of the canal on drinking water. Therefore, irrigation rights are not being renewed, and the city is providing pressurised water instead.

Furthermore, the canal authority employs 15 chercheurs de fuite (French: literally "searchers of leaks"), who are responsible for finding leaks in the distribution system. To help them, they use geophones, which amplify sound up to 400 times. Employees have allowed the efficiency of the canal to be raised to 85%.

=== Security ===
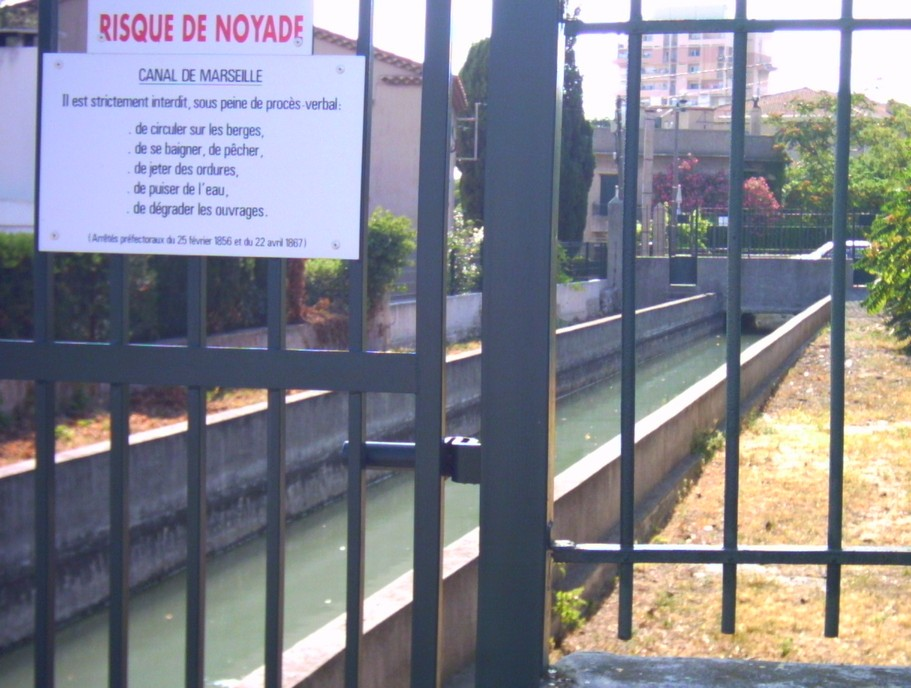
The canal in Marseille (Saint-Barnabé, 12th arr.)

The canal outside Marseille is open to the air and can be followed along the road except for the underground sections. However, within the city limits, efforts are being made to close up the canal, prompted by safety concerns over the unpredictable nature of the water's flow following valve openings and the steep and slippery walls. In addition, there are ongoing campaigns aimed at adding fences, lifelines and barriers and posting warning signs along the canal's route

=== As tourist site and cultural attraction ===
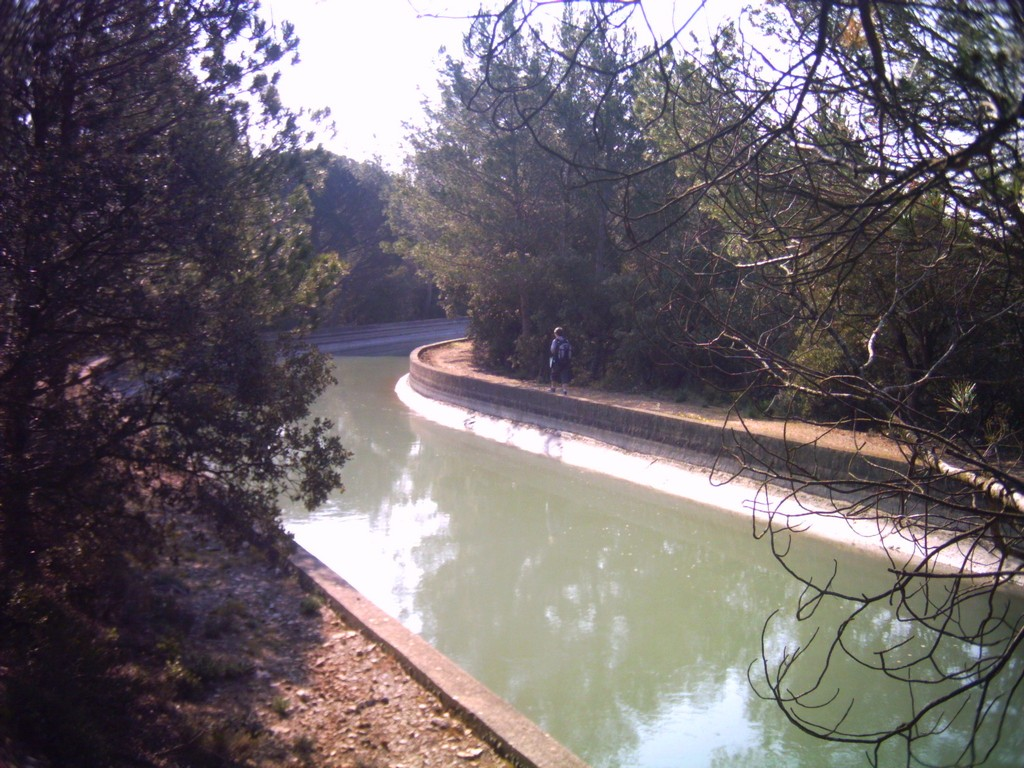
The canal along the plain of Arbois.

The canal passes through many picturesque regions of Provence and contains bicycle and walking paths along its route.

Notable sites include:

- The aqueduc de Roquefavour, near Aix-en-Provence;
- The palais Longchamp, an historic monument in the center of Marseille;
- The réservoir de Sainte-Marthe;
- The banks of the canal along the Plateau d'Arbois.

==== Marcel Pagnol ====
French novelist Marcel Pagnol refers to the canal in his memoirs, Le Château de ma mère, and states that his father gave a key to enable him to enter the canal through private property and thus shorten his journey. However, the truth of that claim is doubted.

== See also ==
- Marseille
- Provence

== Bibliography ==
- (in French) Les gens de Marseille font le guide, éd. Images en manœuvres éditions, 2003 (chapitre « L'eau avec Emmanuel Guiol »)
