= Roquefavour Aqueduct =

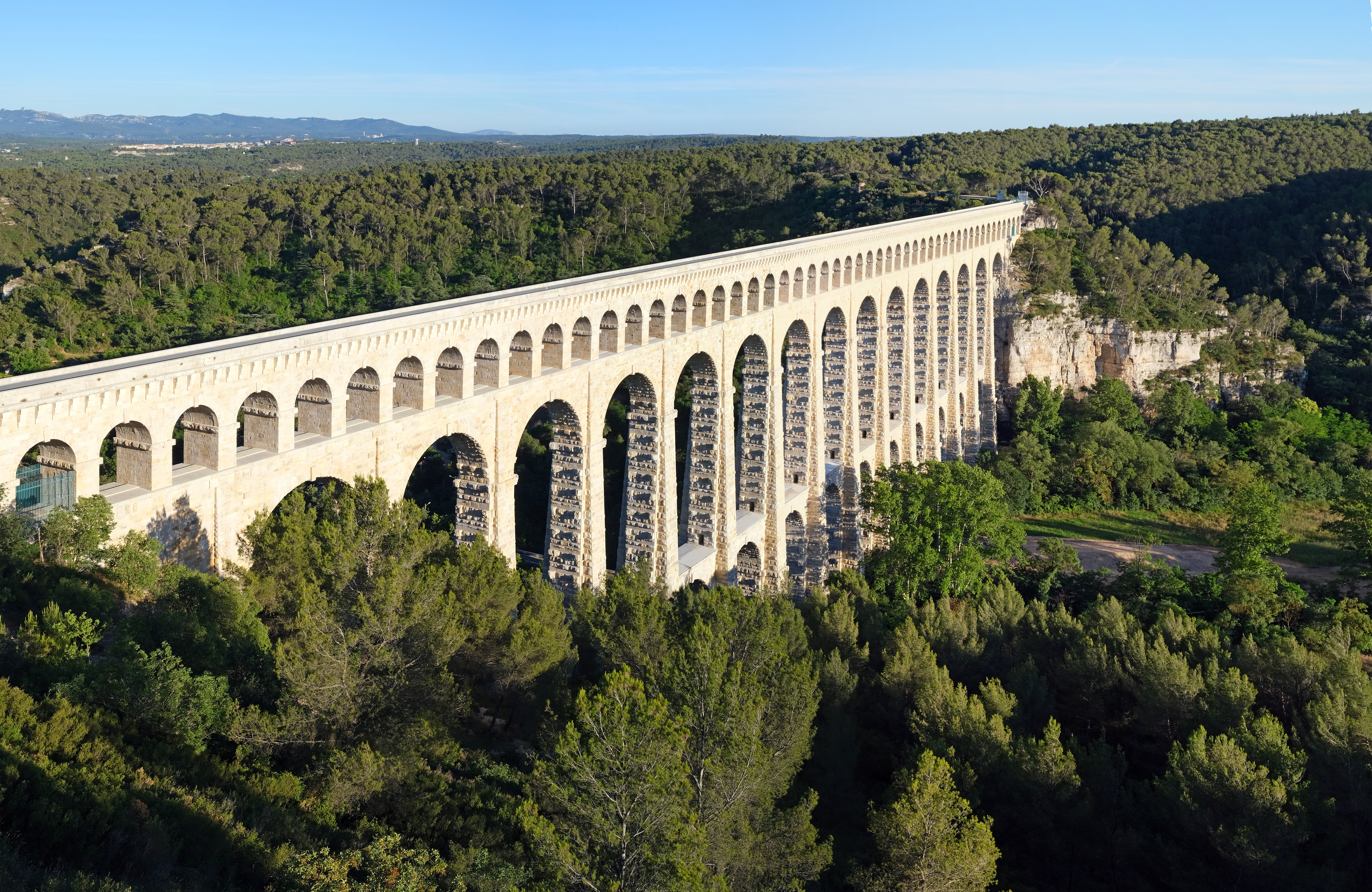
- Interactive map of the Roquefavour Aqueduct area

General information
- Type: Aqueduct
- Location: Ventabren, France
- Coordinates: 43°30′58.3″N 5°18′45.1″E
- Construction started: 1841
- Completed: 1847

Height
- Height: 83 metres

Dimensions
- Other dimensions: Length: 375 metres

Design and construction
- Structural engineer: Jean François Mayor de Montricher

The Roquefavour Aqueduct (French: Aqueduc de Roquefavour) is an aqueduct in the commune of Ventabren, near Aix-en-Provence, Bouches-du-Rhône, France. The aqueduct was first planned in 1565, but it was not realized until the 19th century. It was designed by Jean François Mayor de Montricher and built between 1841 and 1847; it is the largest stone aqueduct in the world. It was designated as a monument historique (national heritage site) in 2002.

== Location ==
The aqueduct is located near Aix-en-Provence. It can be reached via the D64 road. It crosses the Arc river in Ventabren.

== History ==
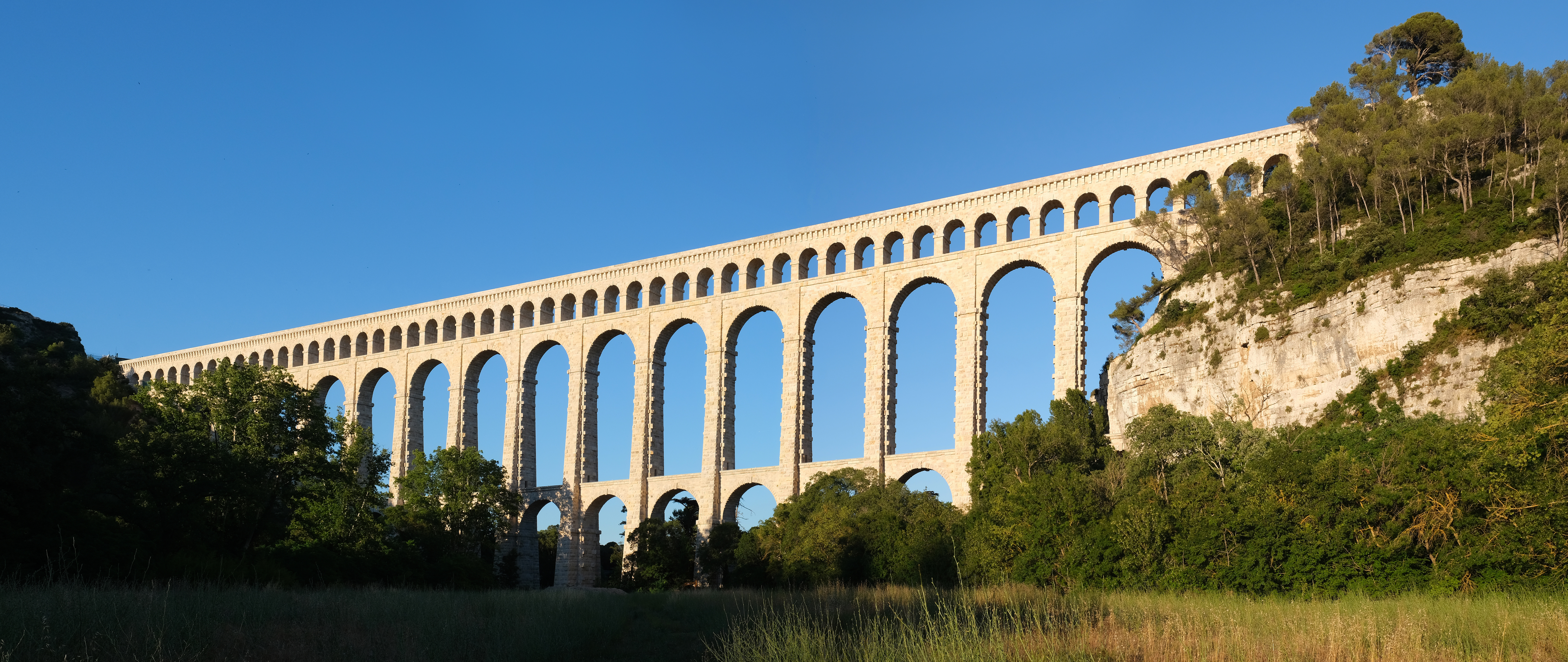
The aqueduct in 2024

The idea of the aqueduct was first envisaged by Adam de Craponne, an engineer from Salon de Provence, in 1565. After the drought of 1834 and the subsequent cholera epidemics, the idea resurfaced. Maximin-Dominique Consolat (1785–1858), who served as the mayor of Marseille from 1832 to 1843, championed the idea. He hired engineer Jean François Mayor de Montricher (1810–1858) to design it. Its construction took six years, from 1841 to 1847. It took 5,000 labourers, including 300 stone-cutters, and it cost 3,800,000 French francs. It is 83 metres high, 375 metres long, and the foundations are 9 to 10 metres deep.

The aqueduct brings water (Canal de Marseille) from the Durance river to the Palais Longchamp in Marseille, all the way to La Ciotat. The water began to flow on 30 June 1847. On 30 September 1852, Emperor Louis Napoléon Bonaparte awarded Jean François Mayor de Montricher the Legion of Honour for his work. It was later photographed by renowned photographer Édouard Baldus.

On 12 September 1992 the 150th anniversary of the aqueduct was celebrated. The ceremony was attended by Jean-Claude Gaudin (Senator and President of the Conseil Régional), Lucien Weygand (the President of the Conseil Général of Bouches-du-Rhone), Robert Vigouroux (Senator and Mayor of Marseille), Jean-François Picheral (Mayor of Aix-en-Provence), Bertrand Dauberlieu (President of the Société des Eaux de Marseille), and Jean-Marie Duron (Mayor of Ventabren).

== Heritage significance ==
The aqueduct has been a monument historique (English: national heritage site) since 2002.

== See also ==
- List of bridges in France

== Bibliography ==
- Vérany, Félix (1882). Roquefavour, son ermitage et son aqueduc [Roquefavour, Its Hermitage and Its Aqueduct: Ventabren] (in French). Marseille: V. Boy.
