= Jean François Mayor de Montricher =

Swiss engineer (1810–1858)

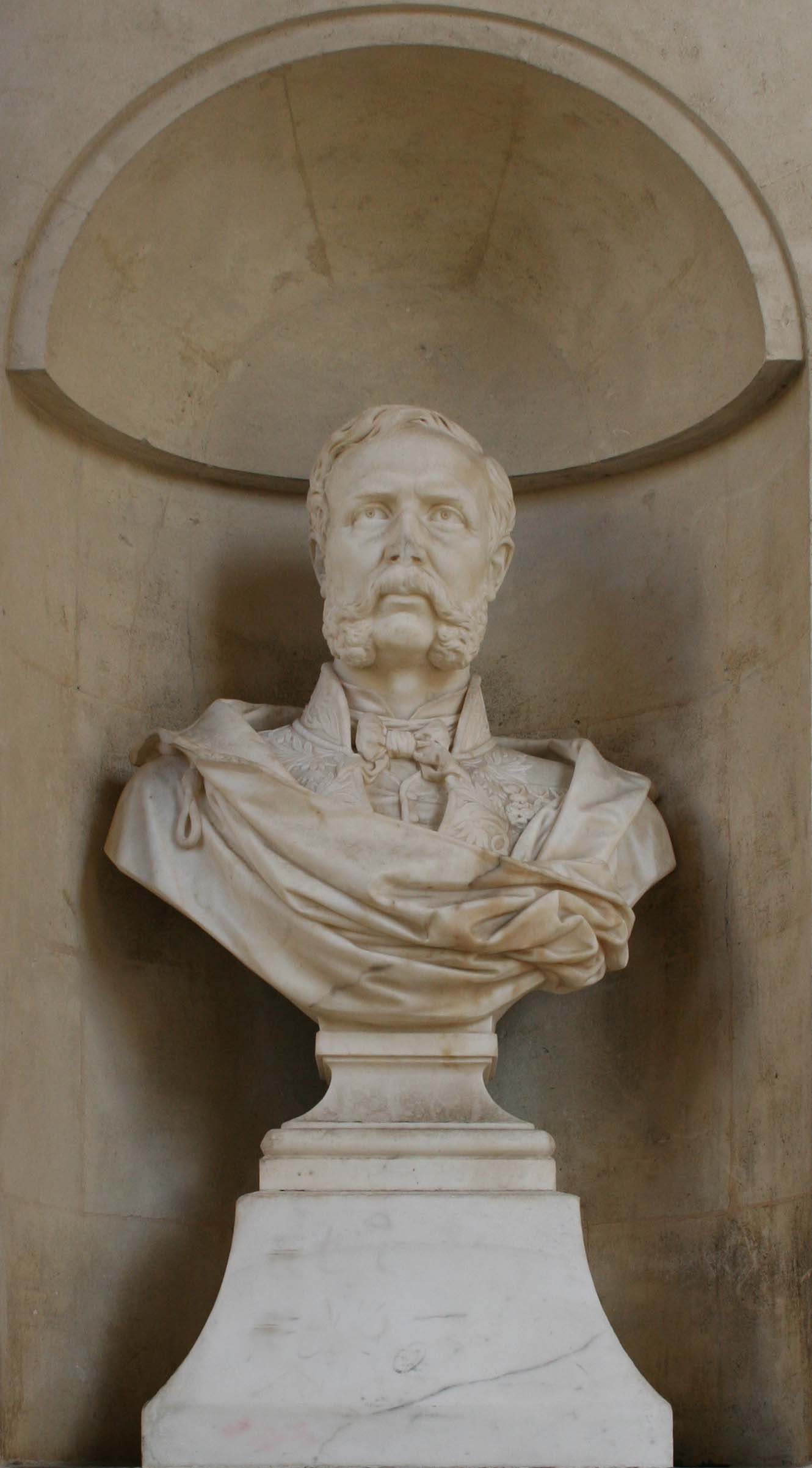
- Bust by Andre-Joseph Allar at the Palais Longchamp in Marseille
- Born: 19 April 1810; Lully, Vaud, Switzerland
- Died: 28 May 1858 (aged 48); Naples, Italy
- Education: Lycée Thiers, Ecole Polytechnique, Ecole des Ponts et Chaussées
- Occupation: Engineer
- Parent(s): Jean Charles Louis Mayor de Montricher; Marie Nicolette Pauline Françoise Chamot

Jean François Mayor de Montricher (otherwise Frantz Mayor de Montricher) (19 April 1810 – 28 May 1858) was a Swiss engineer. He designed the Roquefavour Aqueduct, near Aix-en-Provence in France, and drained the Fucine Lake in Central Italy.

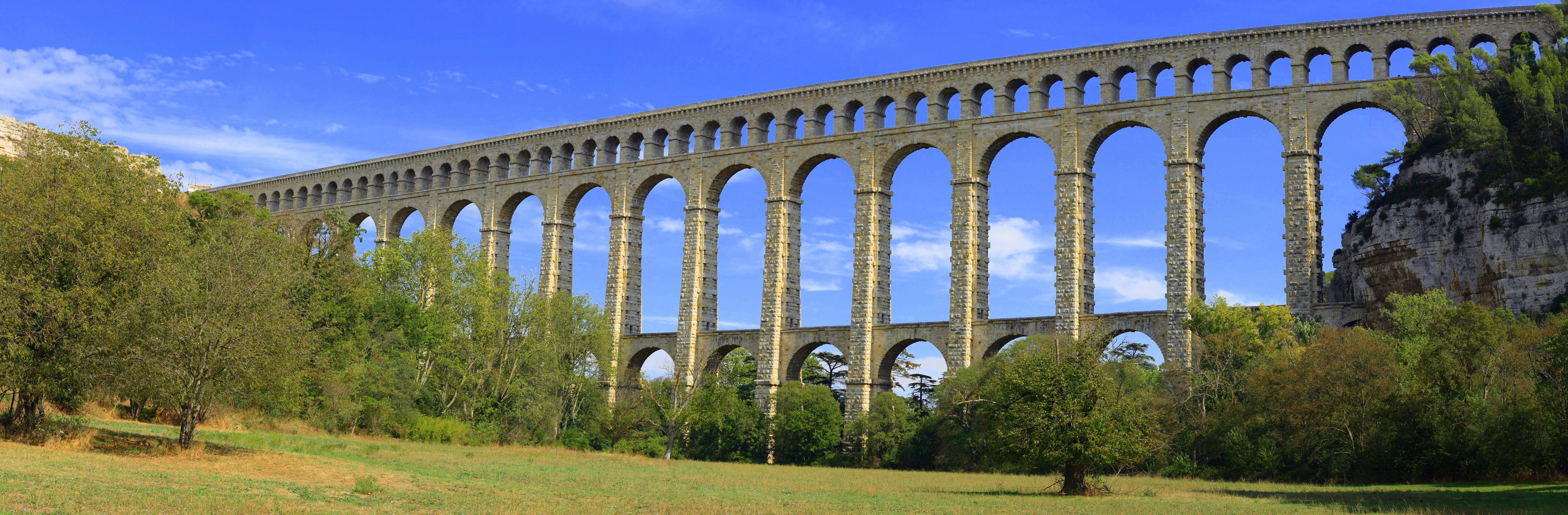
The Roquefavour Aqueduct

== Biography ==
=== Early life ===
Jean François Mayor de Montricher was born on 19 April 1810 in Lully, Vaud, Switzerland. His mother was Marie Nicolette Pauline Françoise Chamot. His father, Jean Charles Louis Mayor de Montricher, was a businessman who moved to Marseille for work. As a result, Jean Francois was educated at the Lycée Thiers in Marseille. He graduated from the Ecole Polytechnique and the Ecole des Ponts et Chaussées.

=== Career ===
Mayor de Montricher was employed by Maximin-Dominique Consolat, the Mayor of Marseilles, to design the Roquefavour Aqueduct. On 30 September 1852 Emperor Louis Napoléon Bonaparte awarded him with the Legion of Honor for his work. In 2002, it became a monument historique (English: national heritage site).

Later, he was commissioned by Alessandro Torlonia, 2nd Prince of Civitella-Cesi, to drain the Fucine Lake in Central Italy. The resulting plain became one of Italy's most fertile regions.

=== Death ===
He died of typhoid fever on 28 May 1858 in Naples, Italy.
